= 2026 Maryland House of Delegates election =

- November 3, 2026

All 141 seats in the Maryland House of Delegates 71 seats needed for a majority
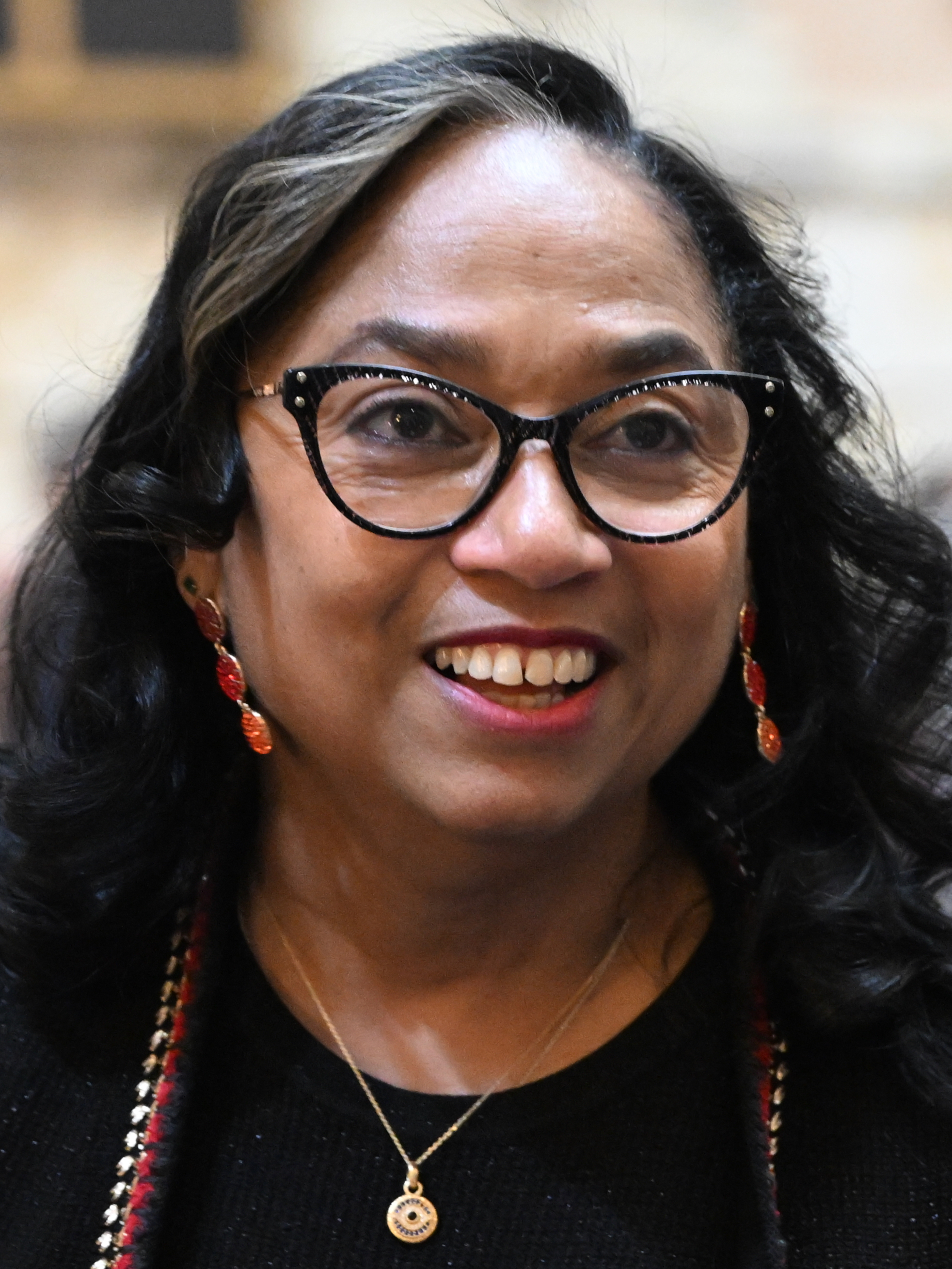

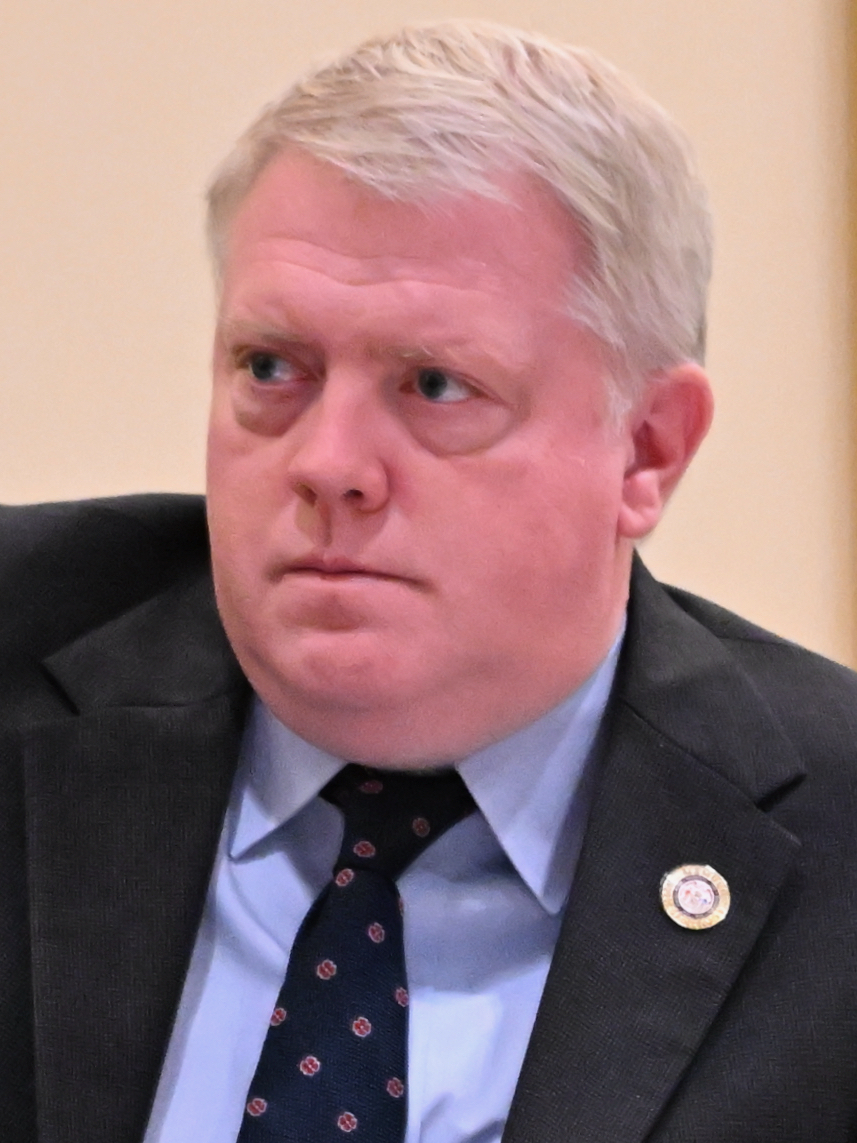
	Majority party	Minority party
Leader	Joseline Peña-Melnyk	Jason C. Buckel
Party	Democratic	Republican
Leader since	December 16, 2025	April 13, 2021
Leader's seat	21st–College Park	1B–Cumberland
Last election	102	39
Seats won	106	35
Seat change	▲4	▼4
- Results of the elections: Democratic hold Democratic gain Republican hold
Speaker before election
Joseline Peña-Melnyk
Democratic
Elected Speaker
Joseline Peña-Melnyk
Democratic

The 2026 Maryland House of Delegates election was held on November 3, 2026 to elect all 141 members of the chamber. This coincided with the election of all 47 of Maryland's state senators, along with other statewide offices.

== Background ==
Harris 50–60% 60–70% 70–80% 80-90% 90-100% / Trump 50–60% 60–70% 70–80%

In the 2024 presidential election, Kamala Harris won 52 districts, while Donald Trump won 36. Republicans represent two districts won by Harris in 2024: District 33B and District 38B.

== Campaign ==
Candidate filing ended on February 24, 2026. Democrats filed for all seats in the Maryland General Assembly for the first time since 1974. Republicans fielded candidates for 89 of the 141 delegate seats.

== Retirements ==
Retiring incumbents by district Democratic incumbent ran Democratic incumbent retired or lost renomination Republican incumbent ran Republican incumbent retired or lost renomination

A total of 20 delegates (12 Democrats and 8 Republicans) retired, 7 of whom (6 Democrats and 1 Republican) retired to run for other offices.

=== Democrats ===
1. District 10: Adrienne A. Jones retired.
2. District 13: Jennifer R. Terrasa retired to run for clerk of the Howard County Circuit Court.
3. District 14: Pamela E. Queen retired.
4. District 19: Bonnie Cullison retired.
5. District 22: Anne Healey retired.
6. District 22: Nicole A. Williams retired.
7. District 23: Adrian Boafo retired to run for Congress in Maryland's 5th congressional district.
8. District 24: Tiffany T. Alston retired to run for run for state senate in District 24.
9. District 28: C. T. Wilson retired to run for state senate in District 28.
10. District 29B: Brian M. Crosby retired.
11. District 32: Mark S. Chang retired to run for state senate in District 32.
12. District 41: Malcolm Ruff retired to run for state senate in District 41.

=== Republicans ===
1. District 1A: Jim Hinebaugh retired.
2. District 4: Barrie Ciliberti retired.
3. District 5: Christopher Eric Bouchat retired.
4. District 31: Nic Kipke retired to run for state senate in the 31st district.
5. District 34B: Susan McComas retired.
6. District 38A: Kevin Anderson retired.
7. District 42A: Alex Harlan retired.
8. District 42C: Joshua Stonko retired.

== Incumbents defeated ==
=== In primaries ===
==== Democrats ====
1. District 40: Frank M. Conaway Jr. lost renomination to Tiffany Welch and incumbents Marlon Amprey and Melissa Wells.
2. District 45: Stephanie M. Smith lost renomination to Chanel Branch and incumbents Jackie Addison and Caylin Young.

==== Republicans ====
1. District 35B: Kevin Hornberger lost renomination to Derek Howell.

=== In the general election ===
==== Republicans ====
1. District 4: April Fleming Miller lost to Jerry Donald, Andrew Duck, and incumbent Jesse Pippy.
2. District 33B: Stuart Schmidt Jr. lost to Chuck Cook.
3. District 38B: Barry Beauchamp lost to Josh Hastings.

== Predictions ==
=== Statewide ===
Source	Ranking	As of
Sabato's Crystal Ball	Safe D	January 22, 2026
State Navigate	Safe D	October 11, 2026

=== Competitive districts ===
District	Incumbent	Last result	State Navigate (Note: Ratings simplified from percentages: <60% = "Tilt"; 60–75% = "Lean"; 75–95% = "Likely"; >95% = "Safe") October 11, 2026	Result
4th	Barrie Ciliberti (retiring)	18.49% R	Tossup	Donald (flip)
4th	April Fleming Miller	18.50% R	Tossup	Duck (flip)
4th	Jesse Pippy	19.09% R	Tilt R	Pippy
6th	Bob Long	22.60% R	Likely R	Long
7A	Kathy Szeliga	37.14% R	Lean R	Szeliga
7A	Ryan Nawrocki	36.78% R	Lean R	Nawrocki
30B	Seth Howard	56.72% R	Tilt R	Howard
31st	Nic Kipke (retiring)	22.24% R	Tossup	Jacobs
31st	LaToya Nkongolo	20.37% R	Likely R	Nkongolo
33B	Stuart Schmidt Jr.	50.66% R	Solid D (flip)	Cook (flip)
34B	Susan McComas (retiring)	60.79% R	Likely R	Taylor
37B	Chris Adams	37.32% R	Likely R	Adams
37B	Tom Hutchinson	35.91% R	Likely R	Hutchinson
38B	Barry Beauchamp	94.47% R	Solid D (flip)	Hastings (flip)
42A	Alex Harlan (retiring)	58.56% R	Lean R	Murphy

== Summary of results by district ==
† denotes incumbents who did not seek re-election. Italics denote an open seat held by the incumbent party; bold text denotes a gain for a party.

All election results are from the Maryland Board of Elections.

District	2024 Pres.	Incumbent	Party	Elected Delegate	Outcome
1A	R+50.5	Jim Hinebaugh†	Rep	Dan Duggan	Rep Hold
1B	R+35.5	Jason C. Buckel	Rep	Jason C. Buckel	Rep Hold
1C	R+47.8	Terry Baker	Rep	Terry Baker	Rep Hold
2A	R+27.0	William Valentine	Rep	William Valentine	Rep Hold
2A	R+27.0	William Wivell	Rep	William Wivell	Rep Hold
2B	D+8.4	Matthew Schindler	Dem	Matthew Schindler	Dem Hold
3	D+32.9	Kris Fair	Dem	Kris Fair	Dem Hold
3	D+32.9	Ken Kerr	Dem	Ken Kerr	Dem Hold
3	D+32.9	Karen Simpson	Dem	Karen Simpson	Dem Hold
4	R+6.1	April Fleming Miller	Rep	**Andrew Duck**	Dem Gain
4	R+6.1	Barrie Ciliberti†	Rep	**Jerry Donald**	Dem Gain
4	R+6.1	Jesse Pippy	Rep	Jesse Pippy	Rep Hold
5	R+21.3	Christopher Eric Bouchat†	Rep	Steve Whisler	Rep Hold
5	R+21.3	April Rose	Rep	April Rose	Rep Hold
5	R+21.3	Chris Tomlinson	Rep	Chris Tomlinson	Rep Hold
6	R+17.9	Robin Grammer Jr.	Rep	Robin Grammer Jr.	Rep Hold
6	R+17.9	Robert B. Long	Rep	Robert B. Long	Rep Hold
6	R+17.9	Ric Metzgar	Rep	Ric Metzgar	Rep Hold
7A	R+8.9	Kathy Szeliga	Rep	Kathy Szeliga	Rep Hold
7A	R+8.9	Ryan Nawrocki	Rep	Ryan Nawrocki	Rep Hold
7B	R+28.2	Lauren Arikan	Rep	Lauren Arikan	Rep Hold
8	D+25.8	Nick Allen	Dem	Nick Allen	Dem Hold
8	D+25.8	Harry Bhandari	Dem	Harry Bhandari	Dem Hold
8	D+25.8	Kim Ross	Dem	Kim Ross	Dem Hold
9A	D+18.9	Chao Wu	Dem	Chao Wu	Dem Hold
9A	D+18.9	Natalie Ziegler	Dem	Natalie Ziegler	Dem Hold
9B	D+40.8	Courtney Watson	Dem	Courtney Watson (Note: Ran unopposed in the general election.)	Dem Hold
10	D+55.3	Adrienne A. Jones†	Dem	Robin Harvey	Dem Hold
10	D+55.3	N. Scott Phillips	Dem	N. Scott Phillips	Dem Hold
10	D+55.3	Jennifer White Holland	Dem	Jennifer White Holland	Dem Hold
11A	D+58.9	Cheryl Pasteur	Dem	Cheryl Pasteur	Dem Hold
11B	D+27.5	Jon Cardin	Dem	Jon Cardin	Dem Hold
11B	D+27.5	Dana Stein	Dem	Dana Stein	Dem Hold
12A	D+50.2	Terri Hill	Dem	Terri Hill	Dem Hold
12A	D+50.2	Jessica Feldmark	Dem	Jessica Feldmark	Dem Hold
12B	D+11.7	Gary Simmons	Dem	Gary Simmons	Dem Hold
13	D+49.9	Gabriel Moreno	Dem	Gabriel Moreno	Dem Hold
13	D+49.9	Pam Guzzone	Dem	Pam Guzzone	Dem Hold
13	D+49.9	Jen Terrasa†	Dem	Amy Brooks	Dem Hold
14	D+43.1	Anne Kaiser	Dem	Anne Kaiser	Dem Hold
14	D+43.1	Bernice Mireku-North	Dem	Bernice Mireku-North	Dem Hold
14	D+43.1	Pamela E. Queen†	Dem	Matt Post	Dem Hold
15	D+44.4	Linda Foley	Dem	Linda Foley	Dem Hold
15	D+44.4	David Fraser-Hidalgo	Dem	David Fraser-Hidalgo	Dem Hold
15	D+44.4	Lily Qi	Dem	Lily Qi	Dem Hold
16	D+63.7	Marc Korman	Dem	Marc Korman	Dem Hold
16	D+63.7	Teresa Saavedra Woorman	Dem	Teresa Saavedra Woorman	Dem Hold
16	D+63.7	Sarah Wolek	Dem	Sarah Wolek	Dem Hold
17	D+54.4	Julie Palakovich Carr	Dem	Julie Palakovich Carr	Dem Hold
17	D+54.4	Ryan Spiegel	Dem	Ryan Spiegel	Dem Hold
17	D+54.4	Joe Vogel	Dem	Joe Vogel	Dem Hold
18	D+62.1	Aaron Kaufman	Dem	Aaron Kaufman	Dem Hold
18	D+62.1	Emily Shetty	Dem	Emily Shetty	Dem Hold
18	D+62.1	Jared Solomon	Dem	Jared Solomon	Dem Hold
19	D+48.1	Charlotte Crutchfield	Dem	Charlotte Crutchfield	Dem Hold
19	D+48.1	Bonnie Cullison†	Dem	Christa Tichy	Dem Hold
19	D+48.1	Vaughn Stewart	Dem	Vaughn Stewart	Dem Hold
20	D+71.0	Lorig Charkoudian	Dem	Lorig Charkoudian	Dem Hold
20	D+71.0	David Moon	Dem	David Moon	Dem Hold
20	D+71.0	Jheanelle Wilkins	Dem	Jheanelle Wilkins	Dem Hold
21	D+55.3	Ben Barnes	Dem	Ben Barnes	Dem Hold
21	D+55.3	Mary A. Lehman	Dem	Mary A. Lehman	Dem Hold
21	D+55.3	Joseline Peña-Melnyk	Dem	Joseline Peña-Melnyk	Dem Hold
22	D+70.5	Anne Healey†	Dem	Molly McKee-Seabrook	Dem Hold
22	D+70.5	Ashanti Martinez	Dem	Ashanti Martinez	Dem Hold
22	D+70.5	Nicole A. Williams†	Dem	Tracy Gant	Dem Hold
23	D+71.5	Adrian Boafo†	Dem	Keenon James	Dem Hold
23	D+71.5	Marvin E. Holmes Jr.	Dem	Marvin E. Holmes Jr.	Dem Hold
23	D+71.5	Kym Taylor	Dem	Kym Taylor	Dem Hold
24	D+80.5	Tiffany Alston†	Dem	LaTasha Ward	Dem Hold
24	D+80.5	Andrea Harrison	Dem	Andrea Harrison	Dem Hold
24	D+80.5	Derrick Coley	Dem	Derrick Coley	Dem Hold
25	D+85.1	Kent Roberson	Dem	Kent Roberson	Dem Hold
25	D+85.1	Denise Roberts	Dem	Denise Roberts	Dem Hold
25	D+85.1	Karen Toles	Dem	Karen Toles	Dem Hold
26	D+79.7	Veronica L. Turner	Dem	Veronica L. Turner	Dem Hold
26	D+79.7	Kris Valderrama	Dem	Kris Valderrama	Dem Hold
26	D+79.7	Jamila Woods	Dem	Jamila Woods	Dem Hold
27A	D+59.4	Darrell Odom	Dem	Darrell Odom	Dem Hold
27B	D+27.0	Jeffrie Long Jr.	Dem	Jeffrie Long Jr.	Dem Hold
27C	R+15.1	Mark N. Fisher	Rep	Mark N. Fisher	Rep Hold
28	D+39.5	Debra Davis	Dem	Debra Davis	Dem Hold
28	D+39.5	Edith J. Patterson	Dem	Edith J. Patterson	Dem Hold
28	D+39.5	C. T. Wilson†	Dem	Abena Affum-McAllister	Dem Hold
29A	R+35.8	Matthew Morgan	Rep	Matthew Morgan	Rep Hold
29B	D+11.5	Brian M. Crosby†	Dem	Adrianne Mathis	Dem Hold
29C	R+14.2	Todd Morgan	Rep	Todd Morgan	Rep Hold
30A	D+31.7	Dylan Behler	Dem	Dylan Behler	Dem Hold
30A	D+31.7	Dana Jones	Dem	Dana Jones	Dem Hold
30B	R+8.0	Seth A. Howard	Rep	Seth A. Howard	Rep Hold
31	R+10.6	Brian Chisholm	Rep	Brian Chisholm	Rep Hold
31	R+10.6	Nic Kipke†	Rep	Mike Jacobs	Rep Hold
31	R+10.6	LaToya Nkongolo	Rep	LaToya Nkongolo	Rep Hold
32	D+30.3	J. Sandy Bartlett	Dem	J. Sandy Bartlett	Dem Hold
32	D+30.3	Mark S. Chang†	Dem	Spencer Dixon	Dem Hold
32	D+30.3	Mike Rogers	Dem	Mike Rogers	Dem Hold
33A	D+35.7	Andrew Pruski	Dem	Andrew Pruski	Dem Hold
33B	D+8.2	Stuart Schmidt Jr.	Rep	**Chuck Cook**	Dem Gain
33C	D+15.2	Heather Bagnall	Dem	Heather Bagnall	Dem Hold
34A	D+16.4	Andre Johnson Jr.	Dem	Andre Johnson Jr.	Dem Hold
34A	D+16.4	Steven C. Johnson	Dem	Steven C. Johnson	Dem Hold
34B	R+9.7	Susan McComas†	Rep	Jake Taylor	Rep Hold
35A	R+34.3	Mike Griffith	Rep	Mike Griffith	Rep Hold
35A	R+34.3	Teresa E. Reilly	Rep	Teresa E. Reilly	Rep Hold
35B	R+38.8	Kevin Hornberger	Rep	Derek Howell	Rep Hold
36	R+23.0	Steven J. Arentz	Rep	Steven J. Arentz	Rep Hold
36	R+23.0	Jefferson L. Ghrist	Rep	Jefferson L. Ghrist	Rep Hold
36	R+23.0	Jay Jacobs	Rep	Jay Jacobs	Rep Hold
37A	D+22.5	Sheree Sample-Hughes	Dem	Sheree Sample-Hughes	Dem Hold
37B	R+18.5	Christopher T. Adams	Rep	Christopher T. Adams	Rep Hold
37B	R+18.5	Tom Hutchinson	Rep	Tom Hutchinson	Rep Hold
38A	R+16.0	Kevin Anderson†	Rep	C. L. Marshall	Rep Hold
38B	D+7.1	Barry Beauchamp	Rep	**Josh Hastings**	Dem Gain
38C	R+31.5	Wayne A. Hartman	Rep	Wayne A. Hartman	Rep Hold
39	D+46.1	Gabriel Acevero	Dem	Gabriel Acevero	Dem Hold
39	D+46.1	Lesley Lopez	Dem	Lesley Lopez	Dem Hold
39	D+46.1	W. Gregory Wims	Dem	W. Gregory Wims	Dem Hold
40	D+80.1	Marlon Amprey	Dem	Marlon Amprey	Dem Hold
40	D+80.1	Frank M. Conaway Jr.	Dem	Tiffany Welch	Dem Hold
40	D+80.1	Melissa Wells	Dem	Melissa Wells	Dem Hold
41	D+65.7	Samuel I. Rosenberg	Dem	Samuel I. Rosenberg	Dem Hold
41	D+65.7	Malcolm Ruff†	Dem	Ryan Turner	Dem Hold
41	D+65.7	Sean Stinnett	Dem	Sean Stinnett	Dem Hold
42A	R+10.4	Alex Harlan†	Rep	Chuck Murphy	Rep Hold
42B	D+25.8	Michele Guyton	Dem	Michele Guyton	Dem Hold
42C	R+34.1	Joshua Stonko†	Rep	Steve Patten	Rep Hold
43A	D+84.8	Regina T. Boyce	Dem	Regina T. Boyce	Dem Hold
43A	D+84.8	Elizabeth Embry	Dem	Elizabeth Embry	Dem Hold
43B	D+56.8	Cathi Forbes	Dem	Cathi Forbes	Dem Hold
44A	D+21.1	Eric Ebersole	Dem	Eric Ebersole	Dem Hold
44B	D+54.7	Aletheia McCaskill	Dem	Aletheia McCaskill	Dem Hold
44B	D+54.7	Sheila Ruth	Dem	Sheila Ruth	Dem Hold
45	D+76.6	Jackie Addison	Dem	Jackie Addison	Dem Hold
45	D+76.6	Stephanie M. Smith	Dem	Chanel Branch	Dem Hold
45	D+76.6	Caylin Young	Dem	Caylin Young	Dem Hold
46	D+62.3	Luke Clippinger	Dem	Luke Clippinger	Dem Hold
46	D+62.3	Mark Edelson	Dem	Mark Edelson	Dem Hold
46	D+62.3	Robbyn Lewis	Dem	Robbyn Lewis	Dem Hold
47A	D+74.1	Diana Fennell	Dem	Diana Fennell	Dem Hold
47A	D+74.1	Julian Ivey	Dem	Julian Ivey	Dem Hold
47B	D+62.9	Deni Taveras	Dem	Deni Taveras	Dem Hold

== District 1A ==
District 1A encompasses all of Garrett County and part of Allegany County. One-term Republican incumbent Jim Hinebaugh was elected with 77.3 percent of the vote in 2022.

=== Republican primary ===
==== Nominee ====
- Dan Duggan, former chief judge of the Garrett County Orphans' Court (2015–2022)

==== Eliminated in primary ====
- Andy Adams, farmer and candidate for this district in 2022
- Edward Clemons Jr., mayor of Luke (2010–2024, 2026–present)
- Lisa Lowe, legislative aide and anti-drug activist
- Tim Thomas, entrepreneur and candidate for this district in 2022

==== Declined ====
- Jim Hinebaugh, incumbent state delegate

==== Results ====
Results by precinct Duggan: 30–40%; 40–50%; 50–60%; 60–70%; 70–80%; Clemons: 40–50%

Republican primary results
Party	Candidate	Votes	%
Republican	Dan Duggan	2,706	54.41%
Republican	Tim Thomas	875	17.60%
Republican	Edward E. Clemons, Jr.	850	17.09%
Republican	Andy Adams	297	5.97%
Republican	Lisa Lowe	245	4.93%
Total votes		4,973	100.00%

=== Democratic primary ===
==== Nominee ====
- Jason Jobe, software engineer

==== Results ====
Democratic primary results
Party	Candidate	Votes	%
Democratic	Jason Jobe	1,424	100.00%
Total votes		1,424	100.00%

=== General election ===
==== Results ====
2026 Maryland House of Delegates District 1A election
Party	Candidate	Votes	%
Republican	Dan Duggan		
Democratic	Jason Jobe		
Write-in			
Total votes			

== District 1B ==
District 1B encompasses the city of Cumberland and parts of Frostburg, both in Allegany County. Three-term Republican incumbent Jason C. Buckel was re-elected with 96.4 percent of the vote in 2022.

=== Republican primary ===
==== Nominee ====
- Jason C. Buckel, incumbent state delegate

==== Results ====
Republican primary results
Party	Candidate	Votes	%
Republican	Jason C. Buckel (incumbent)	3,420	100.00%
Total votes		3,420	100.00%

=== Democratic primary ===
==== Nominee ====
- Rhiannon Brown, creamery owner

==== Results ====
Democratic primary results
Party	Candidate	Votes	%
Democratic	Rhiannon C. Brown	2,037	100.00%
Total votes		2,037	100.00%

=== General election ===
==== Results ====
2026 Maryland House of Delegates District 1B election
Party	Candidate	Votes	%
Republican	Jason C. Buckel (incumbent)		
Democratic	Rhiannon C. Brown		
Write-in			
Total votes			

== District 1C ==
District 1C includes east Allegany and west Washington counties. One-term Republican incumbent Terry Baker was elected with 76.0 percent of the vote in 2022.

=== Republican primary ===
==== Nominee ====
- Terry Baker, incumbent state delegate

==== Results ====
Republican primary results
Party	Candidate	Votes	%
Republican	Terry Baker (incumbent)	3,192	100.00%
Total votes		3,192	100.00%

=== Democratic primary ===
==== Nominee ====
- Seth Funk, campaign aide

==== Results ====
Democratic primary results
Party	Candidate	Votes	%
Democratic	Seth Funk	1,617	100.00%
Total votes		1,617	100.00%

=== General election ===
==== Results ====
2026 Maryland House of Delegates District 1C election
Party	Candidate	Votes	%
Republican	Terry Baker (incumbent)		
Democratic	Seth Funk		
Write-in			
Total votes			

== District 2A ==
District 2A includes east Washington and north Frederick counties. Its Republican incumbents, William Valentine and William J. Wivell, won a combined 98.2 percent of the vote in 2022.

=== Republican primary ===
==== Nominees ====
- William Valentine, incumbent state delegate
- William J. Wivell, incumbent state delegate

==== Eliminated in primary ====
- Dianna Palmer, community activist

==== Results ====
Republican primary results
Party	Candidate	Votes	%
Republican	William J. Wivell (incumbent)	5,301	45.88%
Republican	William Valentine (incumbent)	4,560	39.47%
Republican	Dianna Palmer	1,692	14.65%
Total votes		11,553	100.00%

=== Democratic primary ===
==== Nominees ====
- John Leonard, construction estimator
- Brandon Thompson, cinematographer

==== Disqualified ====
- Aamina Hutchison, counselor

==== Results ====
Democratic primary results
Party	Candidate	Votes	%
Democratic	John Leonard	4,053	50.02%
Democratic	Brandon Thompson	4,050	49.98%
Total votes		8,103	100.00%

=== General election ===
==== Results ====
2026 Maryland House of Delegates District 2A election
Party	Candidate	Votes	%
Republican	William Valentine (incumbent)		
Republican	William J. Wivell (incumbent)		
Democratic	John Leonard		
Democratic	Brandon Thompson		
Write-in			
Total votes			

== District 2B ==
District 2B encompasses the city of Hagerstown in Washington County. Democrat Brooke Grossman was elected with 54.2 percent of the vote in 2022, but resigned on December 13, 2024, after moving out of the state. Former Hagerstown city councilmember Matthew Schindler was nominated by the Washington County Democratic Central Committee in December 2024, and sworn into the legislature in January 2025.

=== Democratic primary ===
==== Nominee ====
- Matthew Schindler, incumbent state delegate

==== Eliminated in primary ====
- Ocewana Baker, actress, community activist, and cinematographer

==== Results ====
Democratic primary results
Party	Candidate	Votes	%
Democratic	Matthew Schindler (incumbent)	1,385	65.15%
Democratic	Ocewana Baker	741	34.85%
Total votes		2,126	100.00%

=== Republican primary ===
==== Nominee ====
- Brenda Thiam, former state delegate (2020–2023), candidate for MD-06 in 2024, and candidate for lieutenant governor in 2026

==== Withdrew after nomination ====
- Sean Flaherty, Hagerstown city councilmember (2024–present)

==== Withdrew ====
- Thomas Stolz, attorney and candidate for this district in 2022

==== Results ====
Republican primary results
Party	Candidate	Votes	%
Republican	Sean Flaherty	1,003	100.00%
Total votes		1,003	100.00%

=== General election ===
==== Results ====
2026 Maryland House of Delegates District 2B election
Party	Candidate	Votes	%
Democratic	Matthew Schindler (incumbent)		
Republican	Brenda Thiam		
Write-in			
Total votes			

== District 3 ==
The 3rd district encompasses the city of Frederick in Frederick County. Its Democratic incumbents—Kenneth P. Kerr, Karen Simpson, and Kris Fair—won with a combined 73.8 percent of the vote in 2022.

=== Democratic primary ===
==== Nominees ====
- Kris Fair, incumbent state delegate
- Kenneth P. Kerr, incumbent state delegate
- Karen Simpson, incumbent state delegate

==== Results ====
Democratic primary results
Party	Candidate	Votes	%
Democratic	Kris Fair (incumbent)	10,202	33.77%
Democratic	Karen Simpson (incumbent)	10,048	33.26%
Democratic	Ken Kerr (incumbent)	9,964	32.98%
Total votes		30,214	100.00%

=== Republican primary ===
==== Nominee ====
- Angela McIntosh, scientist and nominee for SD-03 in 2022

==== Withdrew after nomination ====
- Ashley Nieves, administrative contractor

==== Results ====
Republican primary results
Party	Candidate	Votes	%
Republican	Angela McIntosh	3,047	50.96%
Republican	Ashley Nieves	2,932	49.04%
Total votes		5,979	100.00%

=== General election ===
==== Results ====
2026 Maryland House of Delegates District 3 election
Party	Candidate	Votes	%
Democratic	Kris Fair (incumbent)		
Democratic	Kenneth P. Kerr (incumbent)		
Democratic	Karen Simpson (incumbent)		
Republican	Angela McIntosh		
Write-in			
Total votes			

== District 4 ==
The 4th district includes most of Frederick County, not including the northern part of the county nor the city of Frederick. Its Republican incumbents—Barrie Ciliberti, April Fleming Miller, and Jesse Pippy—won a combined 56.1 percent of the vote in 2022.

=== Republican primary ===
==== Nominees ====
- Jason Keckler, former member of the Maryland Parole Commission (2018–2023)
- April Fleming Miller, incumbent state delegate
- Jesse Pippy, incumbent state delegate

==== Declined ====
- Barrie Ciliberti, incumbent state delegate

==== Results ====
Republican primary results
Party	Candidate	Votes	%
Republican	Jesse Pippy (incumbent)	8,359	35.82%
Republican	April Fleming Miller (incumbent)	7,533	32.28%
Republican	Jason Keckler	7,442	31.89%
Total votes		23,334	100.00%

=== Democratic primary ===
==== Nominees ====
- Jerry Donald, Frederick County councilmember from the 1st district (2014–present)
- Andrew Duck, perennial candidate
- Alleria Stanley, retired U.S. Army veteran

==== Eliminated in primary ====
- Paul Gilligan, former mayor of Burkittsville (1995–1998)

==== Results ====
Democratic primary results
Party	Candidate	Votes	%
Democratic	Andrew Duck	7,265	28.34%
Democratic	Jerry Donald	7,036	27.45%
Democratic	Alleria Stanley	6,008	23.42%
Democratic	Paul Gilligan	5,331	20.79%
Total votes		25,640	100.00%

=== General election ===
==== Results ====
2026 Maryland House of Delegates District 4 election
Party	Candidate	Votes	%
Republican	Jason Keckler		
Republican	April Fleming Miller (incumbent)		
Republican	Jesse Pippy (incumbent)		
Democratic	Andrew Duck		
Democratic	Jerry Donald		
Democratic	Alleria Stanley		
Write-in			
Total votes			

== District 5 ==
The 5th district encompasses most of Carroll County, including Eldersburg and Westminster. Its Republican incumbents—April Rose, Chris Tomlinson, and Christopher Eric Bouchat—won with a combined 97.2 percent of the vote in 2022. In March 2023, Bouchat told the Frederick News-Post that he would not run for a second term in 2026.

=== Republican primary ===
==== Nominees ====
- April Rose, incumbent state delegate
- Chris Tomlinson, incumbent state delegate
- Steve Whisler, member of the Carroll County Board of Education (2022–present)

==== Eliminated in primary ====
- Sallie B. Taylor, former chief of staff to state delegate Dan Cox and candidate for this district in 2022

==== Declined ====
- Christopher Eric Bouchat, incumbent state delegate

==== Results ====
Republican primary results
Party	Candidate	Votes	%
Republican	April Rose (incumbent)	7,965	28.01%
Republican	Chris Tomlinson (incumbent)	7,894	27.76%
Republican	Steve Whisler	7,548	26.54%
Republican	Sallie B. Taylor	5,034	17.70%
Total votes		28,441	100.00%

=== Democratic primary ===
==== Nominees ====
- Dayana Bergman, former behavioral technician
- Alison Rudolph, former bookstore owner
- Courtney Welch

==== Results ====
Democratic primary results
Party	Candidate	Votes	%
Democratic	Alison Rudolph	5,709	35.19%
Democratic	Dayana Bergman	5,420	33.41%
Democratic	Courtney Welch	5,096	31.41%
Total votes		16,225	100.00%

=== General election ===
==== Results ====
2026 Maryland House of Delegates District 5 election
Party	Candidate	Votes	%
Republican	April Rose (incumbent)		
Republican	Chris Tomlinson (incumbent)		
Republican	Steve Whisler		
Democratic	Dayana Bergman		
Democratic	Alison Rudolph		
Democratic	Courtney Welch		
Write-in			
Total votes			

== District 6 ==
The 6th district encompasses southeast Baltimore County, including Dundalk, Essex, and Edgemere. Its Republican incumbents—Ric Metzgar, Robin Grammer Jr., and Robert B. Long—won with a combined 69.3 percent of the vote in 2022.

=== Republican primary ===
==== Nominees ====
- Robert B. Long, incumbent state delegate
- Robin Grammer Jr., incumbent state delegate
- Ric Metzgar, incumbent state delegate

==== Eliminated in primary ====
- Bobby "Al Jolson" Berger, retired police officer and former blackface performer
- Henry Ciezkowski, U.S. Marine Corps veteran and candidate for county executive in 2022

==== Results ====
Republican primary results
Party	Candidate	Votes	%
Republican	Bob Long (incumbent)	3,494	25.27%
Republican	Robin Grammer Jr. (incumbent)	3,286	23.77%
Republican	Ric Metzgar (incumbent)	3,163	22.88%
Republican	Henry Ciezkowski	2,596	18.78%
Republican	Bobby "Al Jolson" Berger	1,287	9.31%
Total votes		13,826	100.00%

=== Democratic primary ===
==== Nominees ====
- Artus Huffman, assistant principal
- Megan Ann Mioduszewski, medical laboratory scientist and nominee for this district in 2018 and 2022
- Rayneika Robinson, president of AFSCME Local 3661

==== Withdrew ====
- Sandra Skordalos, teacher and member of the Baltimore County Democratic Central Committee

==== Results ====
Democratic primary results
Party	Candidate	Votes	%
Democratic	Megan Ann Mioduszewski	4,234	35.33%
Democratic	Rayneika Robinson	3,965	33.08%
Democratic	Artus Huffman	3,786	31.59%
Total votes		11,985	100.00%

=== Third-party and independent candidates ===
==== Disqualified ====
- Brett Shepherd (Independent)

=== General election ===
==== Results ====
2026 Maryland House of Delegates District 6 election
Party	Candidate	Votes	%
Republican	Robin Grammer Jr. (incumbent)		
Republican	Ric Metzgar (incumbent)		
Republican	Robert B. Long (incumbent)		
Democratic	Artus Huffman		
Democratic	Megan Ann Mioduszewski		
Democratic	Rayneika Robinson		
Write-in			
Total votes			

== District 7A ==
District 7A encompasses east Baltimore County, including Kingsville and Bowleys Quarters. Its Republican incumbents, Kathy Szeliga and Ryan Nawrocki, won with a combined 73.9 percent of the vote in 2022.

=== Republican primary ===
==== Nominees ====
- Ryan Nawrocki, incumbent state delegate
- Kathy Szeliga, incumbent state delegate

==== Results ====
Republican primary results
Party	Candidate	Votes	%
Republican	Kathy Szeliga (incumbent)	5,095	50.68%
Republican	Ryan Nawrocki (incumbent)	4,959	49.32%
Total votes		10,054	100.00%

=== Democratic primary ===
==== Nominees ====
- Ly Xīnzhèn M. Zhǎngsūn Brown, disability rights advocate and nominee for this district in 2022
- Satish Chapagain, business owner and member of the Baltimore County Democratic Central Committee

==== Eliminated in primary ====
- Tom Baker, franchisee
- Cleveland Reynolds, teacher

==== Results ====
Democratic primary results
Party	Candidate	Votes	%
Democratic	Ly Xīnzhèn M. Zhǎngsūn Brown	2,945	28.31%
Democratic	Satish Chapagain	2,718	26.13%
Democratic	Tom Baker	2,530	24.32%
Democratic	Cleveland Reynolds	2,209	21.24%
Total votes		10,402	100.00%

=== General election ===
==== Results ====
2026 Maryland House of Delegates District 7A election
Party	Candidate	Votes	%
Republican	Ryan Nawrocki (incumbent)		
Republican	Kathy Szeliga (incumbent)		
Democratic	Ly Xīnzhèn M. Zhǎngsūn Brown		
Democratic	Satish Chapagain		
Write-in			
Total votes			

== District 7B ==
District 7B runs along the borders of Baltimore and Harford counties. Two-term Republican incumbent Lauren Arikan was reelected with 67.2 percent of the vote in 2022.

=== Republican primary ===
==== Nominee ====
- Lauren Arikan, incumbent state delegate

==== Results ====
Republican primary results
Party	Candidate	Votes	%
Republican	Lauren Arikan (incumbent)	4,144	100.00%
Total votes		4,144	100.00%

=== Democratic primary ===
==== Nominee ====
- Candace Hart, notary

==== Results ====
Democratic primary results
Party	Candidate	Votes	%
Democratic	Candace Hart	2,033	100.00%
Total votes		2,033	100.00%

=== General election ===
==== Results ====
2026 Maryland House of Delegates District 7B election
Party	Candidate	Votes	%
Republican	Lauren Arikan (incumbent)		
Democratic	Candace Hart		
Write-in			
Total votes			

== District 8 ==
The 8th district consists of part of Baltimore County, including Perry Hall and Parkville. Its Democratic incumbents—Carl W. Jackson, Harry Bhandari, and Nick Allen—won with a combined 62.2 percent of the vote in 2022. Jackson was appointed to the Maryland Senate after the Baltimore County Council elected Kathy Klausmeier to serve the remainder of Johnny Olszewski's term as Baltimore County Executive in January 2025, and was succeeded by Kim Ross.

=== Democratic primary ===
==== Nominees ====
- Nick Allen, incumbent state delegate
- Harry Bhandari, incumbent state delegate
- Kim Ross, incumbent state delegate

==== Eliminated in primary ====
- Kumasi Barnett, artist
- Marsha Briley-Savage, re-entry coordinator with the Anne Arundel County Department of Detention Facilities

==== Results ====
Democratic primary results
Party	Candidate	Votes	%
Democratic	Kim Ross (incumbent)	6,432	25.75%
Democratic	Harry Bhandari (incumbent)	6,374	25.52%
Democratic	Nick Allen (incumbent)	5,970	23.90%
Democratic	Marsha Briley-Savage	3,911	15.66%
Democratic	Kumasi Barnett	2,292	9.18%
Total votes		24,979	100.00%

=== Republican primary ===
==== Nominees ====
- Brian Campbell
- Glen Geelhaar, engineering assistant and nominee for this district in 2022
- Steven Riemer

==== Eliminated in primary ====
- Zulieka Baysmore, nominee for HD-40 in 2022
- Jacqueline Stevenson, entrepreneur

==== Results ====
Republican primary results
Party	Candidate	Votes	%
Republican	Brian Campbell	2,175	26.87%
Republican	Steven Riemer	2,045	25.26%
Republican	Glen Geelhaar	1,879	23.21%
Republican	Jacqueline Stevenson	1,592	19.67%
Republican	Zulieka A. Baysmore	404	4.99%
Total votes		8,095	100.00%

=== General election ===
==== Results ====
2026 Maryland House of Delegates District 8 election
Party	Candidate	Votes	%
Democratic	Nick Allen (incumbent)		
Democratic	Harry Bhandari (incumbent)		
Democratic	Kim Ross (incumbent)		
Republican	Brian Campbell		
Republican	Glen Geelhaar		
Republican	Steven Riemer		
Write-in			
Total votes			

== District 9A ==
District 9A encompasses north Howard County, including Cooksville, Lisbon, and Clarksville, and part of Montgomery County. Its Democratic incumbents, Natalie Ziegler and Chao Wu, won with a combined 53.1 percent of the vote in 2022.

=== Democratic primary ===
==== Nominees ====
- Chao Wu, incumbent state delegate
- Natalie Ziegler, incumbent state delegate

==== Results ====
Democratic primary results
Party	Candidate	Votes	%
Democratic	Natalie Ziegler (incumbent)	6,933	50.39%
Democratic	Chao Wu (incumbent)	6,825	49.61%
Total votes		13,758	100.00%

=== Republican primary ===
==== Nominees ====
- Fitzgerald Mofor, former UAB Blazers football linebacker
- Spencer Rhoda

==== Results ====
Republican primary results
Party	Candidate	Votes	%
Republican	Fitzgerald Mofor	2,089	50.26%
Republican	Spencer Rhoda	2,067	49.74%
Total votes		4,156	100.00%

=== Third-party and independent candidates ===
==== Declared ====
- Saif Rehman (Independent), business owner and Republican candidate for this district in 2022

=== General election ===
==== Results ====
2026 Maryland House of Delegates District 9A election
Party	Candidate	Votes	%
Democratic	Chao Wu (incumbent)		
Democratic	Natalie Ziegler (incumbent)		
Republican	Fitzgerald Mofor		
Republican	Spencer Rhoda		
Independent	Saif Rehman		
Write-in			
Total votes			

== District 9B ==
The District 9B includes all of Ellicott City in Howard County. Two-term Democratic incumbent Courtney Watson was reelected with 65.9 percent of the vote in 2022.

=== Democratic primary ===
==== Nominee ====
- Courtney Watson, incumbent state delegate

==== Eliminated in primary ====
- Abdun Matin, mental health therapist

==== Results ====
Democratic primary results
Party	Candidate	Votes	%
Democratic	Courtney Watson (incumbent)	4,474	83.22%
Democratic	Abdun Matin	902	16.78%
Total votes		5,376	100.00%

=== General election ===
==== Results ====
2026 Maryland House of Delegates District 9B election
Party	Candidate	Votes	%
Democratic	Courtney Watson (incumbent)		
Write-in			
Total votes			

== District 10 ==
The 10th district encompasses east Baltimore County, including Randallstown and Reisterstown. Its Democratic incumbents—Adrienne A. Jones, Jennifer White Holland, and N. Scott Phillips—won with a combined 83.2 percent of the vote in 2022.

=== Democratic primary ===
==== Nominees ====
- Robin Harvey, former member of the Baltimore County Board of Education from the 1st district (2022–2026)
- N. Scott Phillips, incumbent state delegate
- Jennifer White Holland, incumbent state delegate

==== Eliminated in primary ====
- Michael T. Brown Sr., U.S. Marine Corps veteran and candidate for this district in 2022
- Jay Jalisi, former state delegate (2015–2023) and candidate for SD-10 in 2022
- William Newton, perennial candidate

==== Withdrew ====
- Adrienne A. Jones, incumbent state delegate (endorsed Harvey)

==== Results ====
Democratic primary results
Party	Candidate	Votes	%
Democratic	Jennifer White Holland (incumbent)	11,871	26.03%
Democratic	Robin Harvey	10,648	23.35%
Democratic	N. Scott Phillips (incumbent)	9,354	20.51%
Democratic	Michael T. Brown, Sr.	6,481	14.21%
Democratic	Jay Jalisi	5,781	12.68%
Democratic	George Newton	1,464	3.21%
Total votes		45,599	100.00%

=== General election ===
==== Results ====
2026 Maryland House of Delegates District 10 election
Party	Candidate	Votes	%
Democratic	Robin Harvey		
Democratic	N. Scott Phillips (incumbent)		
Democratic	Jennifer White Holland (incumbent)		
Write-in			
Total votes			

== District 11A ==
District 11A encompasses central Baltimore County, stretching from Garrison to Cockeysville. One-term Democratic incumbent Cheryl Pasteur was elected with 98.3 percent of the vote in 2022.

=== Democratic primary ===
==== Nominee ====
- Cheryl Pasteur, incumbent state delegate

==== Eliminated in primary ====
- Nico Sanders, nonprofit executive

==== Results ====
Democratic primary results
Party	Candidate	Votes	%
Democratic	Cheryl Pasteur (incumbent)	3,925	80.07%
Democratic	Nico Sanders	977	19.93%
Total votes		4,902	100.00%

=== General election ===
==== Results ====
2026 Maryland House of Delegates District 11A election
Party	Candidate	Votes	%
Democratic	Cheryl Pasteur (incumbent)		
Write-in			
Total votes			

== District 11B ==
District 11B encompasses central Baltimore County, including Pikesville and Mays Chapel. Its Democratic incumbents, Jon Cardin and Dana Stein, won with a combined 68.8 percent of the vote in 2022.

=== Democratic primary ===
==== Nominees ====
- Jon Cardin, incumbent state delegate
- Dana Stein, incumbent state delegate

==== Results ====
Democratic primary results
Party	Candidate	Votes	%
Democratic	Jon Cardin (incumbent)	11,362	51.42%
Democratic	Dana Stein (incumbent)	10,733	48.58%
Total votes		22,095	100.00%

=== Republican primary ===
==== Nominees ====
- John Gordon, orthopedist

==== Results ====
Republican primary results
Party	Candidate	Votes	%
Republican	John Gordon	2,058	100.00%
Total votes		2,058	100.00%

=== General election ===
==== Results ====
2026 Maryland House of Delegates District 11B election
Party	Candidate	Votes	%
Democratic	Jon Cardin (incumbent)		
Democratic	Dana Stein (incumbent)		
Republican	John Gordon		
Write-in			
Total votes			

== District 12A ==
District 12A encompasses part of Howard County, including Columbia and Hanover. Its Democratic incumbents, Terri Hill and Jessica Feldmark, won with a combined 98.4 percent of the vote in 2022.

=== Democratic primary ===
==== Nominees ====
- Jessica Feldmark, incumbent state delegate
- Terri Hill, incumbent state delegate

==== Eliminated in primary ====
- Joshua Heard, attorney

==== Withdrew ====
- Alicia Altamirano, immigration attorney
- James Ebersole, data analyst and son of state delegate Eric Ebersole
- John Handley, deputy chief of staff to Global Refuge

==== Results ====
Democratic primary results
Party	Candidate	Votes	%
Democratic	Jessica Feldmark (incumbent)	8,083	41.66%
Democratic	Terri Hill (incumbent)	8,031	41.39%
Democratic	Joshua M. Heard	3,290	16.96%
Total votes		19,404	100.00%

=== Republican primary ===
==== Nominee ====
- Frank Glover, venture capitalist

==== Results ====
Republican primary results
Party	Candidate	Votes	%
Republican	Frank Glover	1,103	100.00%
Total votes		1,103	100.00%

=== General election ===
==== Results ====
2026 Maryland House of Delegates District 12A election
Party	Candidate	Votes	%
Democratic	Jessica Feldmark (incumbent)		
Democratic	Terri Hill (incumbent)		
Republican	Frank Glover		
Write-in			
Total votes			

== District 12B ==
District 12B encompasses part of north Anne Arundel County, including parts of Brooklyn Park and Glen Burnie. One-term Democratic incumbent Gary Simmons was elected with 55.4 percent of the vote in 2022.

=== Democratic primary ===
==== Nominee ====
- Gary Simmons, incumbent state delegate

==== Disqualified ====
- John Dove Jr., U.S. Marine Corps veteran and Maryland Department of Labor commissioner

==== Withdrew ====
- Geonta Simmons, member of the Anne Arundel Democratic Central Committee (ran for county council)

==== Results ====
Democratic primary results
Party	Candidate	Votes	%
Democratic	Gary Simmons (incumbent)	2,302	100.00%
Total votes		2,302	100.00%

=== Republican primary ===
==== Nominee ====
- Blair Brannock, casino auditor

==== Results ====
Republican primary results
Party	Candidate	Votes	%
Republican	Blair Brannock	826	100.00%
Total votes		826	100.00%

=== General election ===
==== Results ====
2026 Maryland House of Delegates District 12B election
Party	Candidate	Votes	%
Democratic	Gary Simmons (incumbent)		
Republican	Blair Brannock		
Write-in			
Total votes			

== District 13 ==
The 13th district encompasses south Howard County. Its Democratic incumbents—Vanessa Atterbeary, Jennifer R. Terrasa, and Pam Guzzone—won with a combined 80.4 percent of the vote in 2022.

=== Democratic primary ===
==== Nominees ====
- Amy Brooks, teacher and candidate for this district in 2022
- Pam Guzzone, incumbent state delegate
- Gabriel Moreno, incumbent state delegate

==== Disqualified ====
- Delbert Jackson, activist

==== Declined ====
- Vanessa Atterbeary, former state delegate (2015–2026) (running for Howard County Executive)
- Jennifer R. Terrasa, incumbent state delegate (running for clerk of the Howard County Circuit Court)

==== Results ====
Democratic primary results
Party	Candidate	Votes	%
Democratic	Amy Brooks	13,136	34.60%
Democratic	Pam Guzzone (incumbent)	12,564	33.09%
Democratic	Gabriel Moreno (incumbent)	12,265	32.31%
Total votes		37,965	100.00%

=== Republican primary ===
==== Nominee ====
- Mark Fisher, financial professional

==== Results ====
Republican primary results
Party	Candidate	Votes	%
Republican	Mark Fisher	1,561	100.00%
Total votes		1,561	100.00%

=== General election ===
==== Results ====
2026 Maryland House of Delegates District 13 election
Party	Candidate	Votes	%
Democratic	Amy Brooks		
Democratic	Pam Guzzone (incumbent)		
Democratic	Gabriel Moreno (incumbent)		
Republican	Mark Fisher		
Write-in			
Total votes			

== District 14 ==
The 14th district runs along the border of Howard and Montgomery counties, including Olney. Its Democratic incumbents—Anne Kaiser, Eric Luedtke, and Pamela E. Queen—won with a combined 78.6 percent of the vote in 2022, shortly after which Luedtke resigned to become Governor Wes Moore's chief legislative officer and Bernice Mireku-North was appointed to serve out Luedtke's term by then-Governor Larry Hogan.

=== Democratic primary ===
==== Nominees ====
- Anne Kaiser, incumbent state delegate
- Bernice Mireku-North, incumbent state delegate
- Matt Post, former student member of the Montgomery County Board of Education (2017–2018)

==== Eliminated in primary ====
- Alicia Contreras-Donello, former U.S. Agency for International Development official

==== Declined ====
- Pamela E. Queen, incumbent state delegate

==== Results ====
Democratic primary results
Party	Candidate	Votes	%
Democratic	Anne Kaiser (incumbent)	12,153	29.96%
Democratic	Matt Post	11,820	29.14%
Democratic	Bernice Mireku-North (incumbent)	11,391	28.08%
Democratic	Alicia Contreras-Donello	5,200	12.82%
Total votes		40,564	100.00%

=== General election ===
==== Results ====
2026 Maryland House of Delegates District 14 election
Party	Candidate	Votes	%
Democratic	Anne Kaiser (incumbent)		
Democratic	Bernice Mireku-North (incumbent)		
Democratic	Matt Post		
Write-in			
Total votes			

== District 15 ==
The 15th district encompasses east Montgomery County, including North Potomac and parts of Germantown. Its Democratic incumbents—Lily Qi, Linda Foley, and David Fraser-Hidalgo—won with a combined 72.8 percent of the vote in 2022.

=== Democratic primary ===
==== Nominees ====
- Linda Foley, incumbent state delegate
- David Fraser-Hidalgo, incumbent state delegate
- Lily Qi, incumbent state delegate

==== Eliminated in primary ====
- Asher Beckwitt, college professor

==== Results ====
Democratic primary results
Party	Candidate	Votes	%
Democratic	Lily Qi (incumbent)	11,605	31.41%
Democratic	Linda Foley (incumbent)	11,380	30.80%
Democratic	David Fraser-Hidalgo (incumbent)	10,500	28.42%
Democratic	Asher Beckwitt	3,462	9.37%
Total votes		36,947	100.00%

=== Republican primary ===
==== Nominee ====
- Peter Chan

==== Results ====
Republican primary results
Party	Candidate	Votes	%
Republican	Peter Chan	1,650	100.00%
Total votes		1,650	100.00%

=== General election ===
==== Results ====
2026 Maryland House of Delegates District 15 election
Party	Candidate	Votes	%
Democratic	Linda Foley (incumbent)		
Democratic	David Fraser-Hidalgo (incumbent)		
Democratic	Lily Qi (incumbent)		
Republican	Peter Chan		
Write-in			
Total votes			

== District 16 ==
The 16th district consists of south Montgomery County, including Potomac and parts of Bethesda. Its Democratic incumbents—Ariana Kelly, Marc Korman, and Sara N. Love—won with a combined 98.8 percent of the vote in 2022. Since then, Kelly was appointed to the Maryland Senate, where she served for one year before resigning to become the executive Director of the Maryland Commission of Women; Love was appointed to the Maryland Senate to succeed Kelly; and Teresa Saavedra Woorman was appointed to succeed Love.

=== Democratic primary ===
==== Nominees ====
- Marc Korman, incumbent state delegate
- Sarah Wolek, incumbent state delegate
- Teresa Saavedra Woorman, incumbent state delegate

==== Eliminated in primary ====
- Tazeen Ahmad, former president of the Montgomery County Women's Democratic Club

==== Results ====
Democratic primary results
Party	Candidate	Votes	%
Democratic	Marc Korman (incumbent)	16,772	33.79%
Democratic	Sarah Wolek (incumbent)	15,218	30.66%
Democratic	Teresa Saavedra Woorman (incumbent)	9,814	19.77%
Democratic	Tazeen Ahmad	7,831	15.78%
Total votes		49,635	100.00%

=== Republican primary ===
==== Nominee ====
- Ann Hingston, member of the Montgomery County Republican Central Committee

==== Results ====
Republican primary results
Party	Candidate	Votes	%
Republican	Ann Hingston	1,296	100.00%
Total votes		1,296	100.00%

=== Third-party and independent candidates ===
==== Declared ====
- Bob White (Working Class Party)

=== General election ===
==== Results ====
2026 Maryland House of Delegates District 16 election
Party	Candidate	Votes	%
Democratic	Marc Korman (incumbent)		
Democratic	Sarah Wolek (incumbent)		
Democratic	Teresa Saavedra Woorman (incumbent)		
Republican	Ann Hingston		
Working Class	Bob White		
Write-in			
Total votes			

== District 17 ==
The 17th district consists of Rockville and Gaithersburg. Its Democratic incumbents—Julie Palakovich Carr, Kumar P. Barve, and Joe Vogel—won with a combined 84.2 percent of the vote. Barve resigned from the legislature in May 2023 after Governor Wes Moore appointed him to the Maryland Public Service Commission, after which Ryan Spiegel was appointed to serve the remainder of his term.

=== Democratic primary ===
==== Nominees ====
- Julie Palakovich Carr, incumbent state delegate
- Ryan Spiegel, incumbent state delegate
- Joe Vogel, incumbent state delegate

==== Eliminated in primary ====
- Christopher Reed, substitute teacher and biotechnology administrator

==== Results ====
Democratic primary results
Party	Candidate	Votes	%
Democratic	Julie Palakovich Carr (incumbent)	11,749	32.77%
Democratic	Joe Vogel (incumbent)	10,364	28.91%
Democratic	Ryan Spiegel (incumbent)	10,263	28.63%
Democratic	Christopher Reed	3,477	9.70%
Total votes		35,853	100.00%

=== General election ===
==== Results ====
2026 Maryland House of Delegates District 17 election
Party	Candidate	Votes	%
Democratic	Julie Palakovich Carr (incumbent)		
Democratic	Ryan Spiegel (incumbent)		
Democratic	Joe Vogel (incumbent)		
Write-in			
Total votes			

== District 18 ==
The 18th district consists of Bethesda, Chevy Chase, Wheaton, and Kensington. Its Democratic incumbents—Emily Shetty, Aaron Kaufman, and Jared Solomon—won with a combined 89.5 percent of the vote in 2022.

=== Democratic primary ===
==== Nominees ====
- Aaron Kaufman, incumbent state delegate
- Emily Shetty, incumbent state delegate
- Jared Solomon, incumbent state delegate

==== Eliminated in primary ====
- Kate Stein, first vice chair of the Montgomery County Women's Democratic Club

==== Results ====
Democratic primary results
Party	Candidate	Votes	%
Democratic	Emily Shetty (incumbent)	12,698	28.92%
Democratic	Jared Solomon (incumbent)	12,690	28.90%
Democratic	Aaron Kaufman (incumbent)	11,875	27.05%
Democratic	Kate Stein	6,645	15.13%
Total votes		43,908	100.00%

=== General election ===
==== Results ====
2026 Maryland House of Delegates District 18 election
Party	Candidate	Votes	%
Democratic	Aaron Kaufman (incumbent)		
Democratic	Emily Shetty (incumbent)		
Democratic	Jared Solomon (incumbent)		
Write-in			
Total votes			

== District 19 ==
The 19th district includes Aspen Hill, Leisure World, and Redland. Its Democratic incumbents—Charlotte Crutchfield, Bonnie Cullison, and Vaughn Stewart—won with a combined 88.8 percent of the vote in 2022.

=== Democratic primary ===
==== Nominees ====
- Charlotte Crutchfield, incumbent state delegate
- Vaughn Stewart, incumbent state delegate
- Christa Tichy, electrical engineer and member of the Montgomery County Democratic Central Committee

==== Eliminated in primary ====
- Sunil Dasgupta, college professor and podcast host
- Sebastian Johnson, former student member of the Montgomery County Board of Education (2005–2006) and member of the Montgomery County Democratic Central Committee
- Gabriel Sorrel, software engineer
- Alec Stone, nonprofit executive

==== Declined ====
- Bonnie Cullison, incumbent state delegate

==== Results ====
Democratic primary results
Party	Candidate	Votes	%
Democratic	Charlotte Crutchfield (incumbent)	10,012	26.09%
Democratic	Vaughn Stewart (incumbent)	9,088	23.69%
Democratic	Christa Tichy	5,014	13.07%
Democratic	Sebastian Johnson	4,722	12.31%
Democratic	Alec Stone	3,711	9.67%
Democratic	Sunil Dasgupta	3,488	9.09%
Democratic	Gabriel Sorrel	2,333	6.08%
Total votes		38,368	100.00%

=== General election ===
==== Results ====
2026 Maryland House of Delegates District 19 election
Party	Candidate	Votes	%
Democratic	Charlotte Crutchfield (incumbent)		
Democratic	Vaughn Stewart (incumbent)		
Democratic	Christa Tichy		
Write-in			
Total votes			

== District 20 ==
The 20th district includes Silver Spring, White Oak, and Takoma Park. Its Democratic incumbents—David Moon, Jheanelle Wilkins, and Lorig Charkoudian—won with a combined 99.2 percent of the vote in 2022.

=== Democratic primary ===
==== Nominees ====
- Lorig Charkoudian, incumbent state delegate
- David Moon, incumbent state delegate
- Jheanelle Wilkins, incumbent state delegate

==== Results ====
Democratic primary results
Party	Candidate	Votes	%
Democratic	David Moon (incumbent)	15,217	33.76%
Democratic	Lorig Charkoudian (incumbent)	15,006	33.29%
Democratic	Jheanelle Wilkins (incumbent)	14,852	32.95%
Total votes		45,075	100.00%

=== General election ===
==== Results ====
2026 Maryland House of Delegates District 20 election
Party	Candidate	Votes	%
Democratic	Lorig Charkoudian (incumbent)		
Democratic	David Moon (incumbent)		
Democratic	Jheanelle Wilkins (incumbent)		
Write-in			
Total votes			

== District 21 ==
The 21st district includes parts of Prince George's and Anne Arundel counties, including College Park, Laurel, and Beltsville. Its Democratic incumbents—House Speaker Joseline Peña-Melnyk, Mary A. Lehman, and Ben Barnes—won with a combined 98.9 percent of the vote in 2022, and are running for re-election.

=== Democratic primary ===
==== Nominees ====
- Benjamin S. Barnes, incumbent state delegate
- Mary A. Lehman, incumbent state delegate
- Joseline Peña-Melnyk, incumbent state delegate

==== Results ====
Democratic primary results
Party	Candidate	Votes	%
Democratic	Joseline Peña-Melnyk (incumbent)	9,869	34.05%
Democratic	Mary A. Lehman (incumbent)	9,624	33.20%
Democratic	Ben Barnes (incumbent)	9,495	32.75%
Total votes		28,988	100.00%

=== General election ===
==== Results ====
2026 Maryland House of Delegates District 21 election
Party	Candidate	Votes	%
Democratic	Benjamin S. Barnes (incumbent)		
Democratic	Mary A. Lehman (incumbent)		
Democratic	Joseline Peña-Melnyk (incumbent)		
Write-in			
Total votes			

== District 22 ==
The 22nd district consists of Hyattsville, Greenbelt, and Riverdale Park. Its Democratic incumbents—Alonzo T. Washington, Nicole A. Williams, and Anne Healey—won with a combined 98.5 percent of the vote in 2022. Governor Wes Moore appointed Washington to the Maryland Senate in January 2023 after appointing its incumbent senator, Paul G. Pinsky, to head the Maryland Energy Administration; Washington was succeeded by Ashanti Martinez.

=== Democratic primary ===
==== Nominees ====
- Tracy Gant, former mayor of Edmonston (2014–2026)
- Ashanti Martinez, incumbent state delegate
- Molly McKee-Seabrook, former chief of staff to Senate President Bill Ferguson (2012–2018)

==== Eliminated in primary ====
- Craig Hayes, political strategist

==== Declined ====
- Anne Healey, incumbent state delegate
- Nicole A. Williams, incumbent state delegate

==== Results ====
Democratic primary results
Party	Candidate	Votes	%
Democratic	Ashanti Martinez (incumbent)	8,340	29.83%
Democratic	Tracy Gant	7,883	28.20%
Democratic	Molly McKee-Seabrook	7,709	27.58%
Democratic	Craig Hayes	4,022	14.39%
Total votes		27,954	100.00%

=== General election ===
==== Results ====
2026 Maryland House of Delegates District 22 election
Party	Candidate	Votes	%
Democratic	Tracy Gant		
Democratic	Ashanti Martinez (incumbent)		
Democratic	Molly McKee-Seabrook		
Write-in			
Total votes			

== District 23 ==
The 23rd district runs along the border of Prince George's and Anne Arundel counties, including Upper Marlboro, Bowie, and South Laurel. Its Democratic incumbents—Marvin E. Holmes Jr., Kym Taylor, and Adrian Boafo—won with a combined 99.1 percent of the vote in 2022.

=== Democratic primary ===
==== Nominees ====
- Marvin E. Holmes Jr., incumbent state delegate
- Keenon James, gun control activist and member of the Prince George's County Democratic Central Committee
- Kym Taylor, incumbent state delegate

==== Eliminated in primary ====
- Michael Bance, software company sales director
- Tambei Chiawah, auditor
- Kris Natesan, pastor
- Le Shaun Quander-Mosley, business owner
- Rebecca Stallworth, teacher

==== Withdrew ====
- Adrian Boafo, incumbent state delegate (running for MD-05)
- Anthony Nelson
- Starsha Sewell
- Daniel Rutherford Wilson, lobbyist

==== Results ====
Democratic primary results
Party	Candidate	Votes	%
Democratic	Kym Taylor (incumbent)	14,004	22.45%
Democratic	Marvin E. Holmes Jr. (incumbent)	13,614	21.83%
Democratic	Keenon James	11,176	17.92%
Democratic	Le Shaun Quander-Mosley	5,946	9.53%
Democratic	Kris Natesan	5,433	8.71%
Democratic	Tambei Chiawah	5,259	8.43%
Democratic	Rebecca Stallworth	4,393	7.04%
Democratic	Michael Bance	2,548	4.08%
Total votes		62,373	100.00%

=== Republican primary ===
==== Nominees ====
- Michael Riker, retired police officer and nominee for the at-large county council special election in 2024
- Kimberly Robinson, businessowner

==== Results ====
Republican primary results
Party	Candidate	Votes	%
Republican	Michael Riker	725	50.66%
Republican	Kimberly Robinson	706	49.34%
Total votes		1,431	100.00%

=== Third-party and independent candidates ===
==== Declared ====
- Lisa Russell, community outreach representative

=== General election ===
==== Results ====
2026 Maryland House of Delegates District 23 election
Party	Candidate	Votes	%
Democratic	Marvin E. Holmes Jr. (incumbent)		
Democratic	Keenon James		
Democratic	Kym Taylor (incumbent)		
Republican	Michael Riker		
Republican	Kimberly Robinson		
Independent	Lisa Russell		
Write-in			
Total votes			

== District 24 ==
The 24th district consists of Seat Pleasant, Springdale, and Lake Arbor. Its Democratic incumbents—Tiffany T. Alston, Andrea Harrison, and Jazz Lewis—won with a combined 99.5 percent of the vote in 2022. Lewis resigned from the Maryland House of Delegates on December 16, 2025.

=== Democratic primary ===
==== Nominees ====
- Derrick Coley, incumbent state delegate
- Andrea Harrison, incumbent state delegate
- LaTasha Ward, community activist, nonprofit executive, and candidate for this district in 2018

==== Eliminated in primary ====
- Crystal Carpenter, nonprofit executive and juvenile justice reform activist
- Stanford Fraser, public defender
- Bobby Henry, attorney and U.S. Army veteran
- Jordan McFarland, attorney and former legislative aide

==== Declined ====
- Tiffany T. Alston, incumbent state delegate (running for state senate)

==== Results ====
Democratic primary results
Party	Candidate	Votes	%
Democratic	Andrea Harrison (incumbent)	12,477	24.79%
Democratic	LaTasha Ward	10,012	19.89%
Democratic	Derrick Coley (incumbent)	8,328	16.54%
Democratic	Crystal Carpenter	7,511	14.92%
Democratic	Bobby Henry	6,588	13.09%
Democratic	Stanford Fraser	4,049	8.04%
Democratic	Jordan McFarland	1,373	2.73%
Total votes		50,338	100.00%

=== General election ===
==== Results ====
2026 Maryland House of Delegates District 24 election
Party	Candidate	Votes	%
Democratic	Derrick Coley (incumbent)		
Democratic	Andrea Harrison (incumbent)		
Democratic	LaTasha Ward		
Write-in			
Total votes			

== District 25 ==
The 25th district consists of Forestville, Westphalia, and Kettering. Its Democratic incumbents—Darryl Barnes, Karen Toles, and Nick Charles—won with a combined 99.6 percent of the vote in 2022. Since then, Barnes resigned to become a lobbyist and was succeeded by Kent Roberson; and Charles was appointed to the Maryland Senate following the resignation of Melony G. Griffith, and was succeeded by Denise Roberts.

=== Democratic primary ===
==== Nominees ====
- Kent Roberson, incumbent state delegate
- Denise Roberts, incumbent state delegate
- Karen Toles, incumbent state delegate

==== Eliminated in primary ====
- Angela Angel, former state delegate (2015–2019), candidate for state senate in 2018, and candidate for MD-04 in 2022
- Antoine Thompson, former New York state senator (2007–2011)
- Anthony Tilghman, former District Heights town commissioner
- Joseph Tolbert III, convention setup manager

==== Results ====
Democratic primary results
Party	Candidate	Votes	%
Democratic	Denise Roberts (incumbent)	14,282	24.76%
Democratic	Karen Toles (incumbent)	13,529	23.45%
Democratic	Kent Roberson (incumbent)	10,001	17.34%
Democratic	Angela Angel	6,806	11.80%
Democratic	Anthony Tilghman	5,718	9.91%
Democratic	Antoine Thompson	4,607	7.99%
Democratic	Joseph Tolbert III	2,740	4.75%
Total votes		57,683	100.00%

=== General election ===
==== Results ====
2026 Maryland House of Delegates District 25 election
Party	Candidate	Votes	%
Democratic	Kent Roberson (incumbent)		
Democratic	Denise Roberts (incumbent)		
Democratic	Karen Toles (incumbent)		
Write-in			
Total votes			

== District 26 ==
The 26th district consists of Friendly, Oxon Hill, and Fort Washington. Its Democratic incumbents—Veronica L. Turner, Jamila Woods, and Kris Valderrama—won with a combined 96.0 percent of the vote in 2022.

=== Democratic primary ===
==== Nominees ====
- Veronica L. Turner, incumbent state delegate
- Kris Valderrama, incumbent state delegate
- Jamila Woods, incumbent state delegate

==== Eliminated in primary ====
- Reginald Martin, nonprofit executive
- Dani Moore-King, realtor

==== Withdrew ====
- Alonzo Turner-Bey, community development assistant

==== Results ====
Democratic primary results
Party	Candidate	Votes	%
Democratic	Jamila Woods (incumbent)	14,822	28.30%
Democratic	Veronica L. Turner (incumbent)	14,309	27.32%
Democratic	Kris Valderrama (incumbent)	12,164	23.22%
Democratic	Dani Moore-King	6,510	12.43%
Democratic	Reginald Martin	4,578	8.74%
Total votes		52,383	100.00%

=== Republican primary ===
==== Nominees ====
- JoAnn Fisher, substitute teacher and nominee for this district in 2002 and 2022
- Ike Puzon, U.S. Navy veteran and nominee for SD-26 in 2018 and 2022

==== Results ====
Republican primary results
Party	Candidate	Votes	%
Republican	JoAnn Y. Fisher	323	51.11%
Republican	Ike Puzon	309	48.89%
Total votes		632	100.00%

=== General election ===
==== Results ====
2026 Maryland House of Delegates District 26 election
Party	Candidate	Votes	%
Democratic	Veronica L. Turner (incumbent)		
Democratic	Kris Valderrama (incumbent)		
Democratic	Jamila Woods (incumbent)		
Republican	JoAnn Fisher		
Republican	Ike Puzon		
Write-in			
Total votes			

== District 27A ==
District 27A encompasses part of north Charles and south Prince George's counties, including Waldorf, Bryantown, and Danville. One-term Democratic incumbent Kevin Harris won election with 98.0 percent of the vote in 2022. In November 2025, Harris was nominated by the Calvert, Charles, and Prince George's County Democratic Central Committees to the Maryland Senate to succeed Michael A. Jackson, who was appointed by Governor Wes Moore to serve as the Secretary of Maryland State Police.

=== Democratic primary ===
==== Nominee ====
- Darrell Odom, incumbent state delegate

==== Eliminated in primary ====
- Clifton Crosby, cybersecurity engineer
- Shawn Maldon, former mayor of Capitol Heights (2018–2021)
- Yonelle Moore Lee, member of the Charles County Board of Education

==== Results ====
Results by precinct Odom: 30–40%; 40–50%; 50–60%; Moore Lee: 30–40%; 40–50%

Democratic primary results
Party	Candidate	Votes	%
Democratic	Darrell Odom (incumbent)	2,413	37.41%
Democratic	Yonelle Moore Lee	2,143	33.22%
Democratic	Clifton Crosby, Jr.	1,105	17.13%
Democratic	Shawn Maldon	789	12.23%
Total votes		6,450	100.00%

=== Republican primary ===
==== Nominee ====
- Jim Crawford, business owner and nominee for the 28th district in 2018

==== Results ====
Republican primary results
Party	Candidate	Votes	%
Republican	Jim Crawford	434	100.00%
Total votes		434	100.00%

=== General election ===
==== Results ====
2026 Maryland House of Delegates District 27A election
Party	Candidate	Votes	%
Democratic	Darrell Odom (incumbent)		
Republican	Jim Crawford		
Write-in			
Total votes			

== District 27B ==
District 27B encompasses parts of south Prince George's and north Calvert counties, including Chesapeake Beach and Baden. One-term Democratic incumbent Jeffrie Long Jr. was elected with 95.3 percent of the vote in 2022.

=== Democratic primary ===
==== Nominee ====
- Jeffrie Long Jr., incumbent state delegate

==== Eliminated in primary ====
- Rachel Jones, former state delegate (2021–2023)

==== Withdrew ====
- Michael Bennett, security specialist

==== Results ====
Results by precinct Long: 50–60%; 60–70%; 70–80%; Jones: 40–50%

Democratic primary results
Party	Candidate	Votes	%
Democratic	Jeffrie Long Jr. (incumbent)	3,866	61.43%
Democratic	Rachel Jones	2,427	38.57%
Total votes		6,293	100.00%

=== Republican primary ===
==== Nominee ====
- Dan Thomas, retired federal employee and military veteran

==== Results ====
Republican primary results
Party	Candidate	Votes	%
Republican	Dan Thomas	1,514	100.00%
Total votes		1,514	100.00%

=== General election ===
==== Results ====
2026 Maryland House of Delegates District 27B election
Party	Candidate	Votes	%
Democratic	Jeffrie Long Jr. (incumbent)		
Republican	Dan Thomas		
Write-in			
Total votes			

== District 27C ==
District 27C encompasses most of Calvert County, excluding its northernmost and southernmost points. Four-term Republican incumbent Mark N. Fisher was re-elected with 95.7 percent of the vote in 2022.

=== Republican primary ===
==== Nominee ====
- Mark N. Fisher, incumbent state delegate

==== Results ====
Republican primary results
Party	Candidate	Votes	%
Republican	Mark N. Fisher (incumbent)	3,398	100.00%
Total votes		3,398	100.00%

=== Democratic primary ===
==== Nominee ====
- Jennifer Davidson, teacher

==== Eliminated in primary ====
- Rocio Mercado Garcia, former U.S. Department of State official

==== Results ====
Democratic primary results
Party	Candidate	Votes	%
Democratic	Jennifer Davidson	2,744	81.23%
Democratic	Rocio Mercado Garcia	634	18.77%
Total votes		3,378	100.00%

=== General election ===
==== Results ====
2026 Maryland House of Delegates District 27C election
Party	Candidate	Votes	%
Republican	Mark N. Fisher (incumbent)		
Democratic	Jennifer Davidson		
Write-in			
Total votes			

== District 28 ==
The 28th district encompasses most of Charles County. Its Democratic incumbents—Debra Davis, C. T. Wilson, and Edith J. Patterson—won with a combined 68.7 percent of the vote in 2022.

=== Democratic primary ===
==== Nominees ====
- Abena Affum-McAllister, former deputy secretary of the Maryland Democratic Party
- Debra M. Davis, incumbent state delegate
- Edith J. Patterson, incumbent state delegate

==== Eliminated in primary ====
- John Jones Jr., lab operations manager
- Evan Smith, chemical engineer
- Tarinna Terrell, community organizer

==== Withdrew ====
- Patrick Troxler, attorney and U.S. Air Force veteran

==== Declined ====
- C. T. Wilson, incumbent state delegate (running for state senate, endorsed Affum-McAllister)

==== Results ====
Democratic primary results
Party	Candidate	Votes	%
Democratic	Debra Davis (incumbent)	12,008	26.38%
Democratic	Edith J. Patterson (incumbent)	11,121	24.43%
Democratic	Abena Affum-McAllister	9,257	20.33%
Democratic	Evan Smith	4,566	10.03%
Democratic	Tarinna Terrell	4,499	9.88%
Democratic	John D. Jones Jr.	4,075	8.95%
Total votes		45,526	100.00%

=== Republican primary ===
==== Nominees ====
- James Ashburn, U.S. Navy veteran and nominee for this district in 2022
- Winfield Clark, pastor

==== Results ====
Republican primary results
Party	Candidate	Votes	%
Republican	James Ashburn	2,113	52.22%
Republican	Winfield Clark	1,933	47.78%
Total votes		4,046	100.00%

=== Third-party and independent candidates ===
==== Disqualified ====
- Anbrea McCoy (Independent)

=== General election ===
==== Results ====
2026 Maryland House of Delegates District 28 election
Party	Candidate	Votes	%
Democratic	Abena Affum-McAllister		
Democratic	Debra Davis (incumbent)		
Democratic	Edith J. Patterson (incumbent)		
Republican	James Ashburn		
Republican	Winfield Clark		
Write-in			
Total votes			

== District 29A ==
District 29A encompasses north St. Mary's County, including Charlotte Hall and Leonardtown. Three-term Republican incumbent Matthew Morgan was re-elected with 97.4 percent of the vote in 2022.

=== Republican primary ===
==== Nominee ====
- Matthew Morgan, incumbent state delegate

==== Results ====
Republican primary results
Party	Candidate	Votes	%
Republican	Matthew Morgan (incumbent)	2,729	100.00%
Total votes		2,729	100.00%

=== Democratic primary ===
==== Nominee ====
- Jennifer Clancy, therapist

==== Results ====
Democratic primary results
Party	Candidate	Votes	%
Democratic	Jennifer Clancy	1,973	100.00%
Total votes		1,973	100.00%

=== General election ===
==== Results ====
2026 Maryland House of Delegates District 29A election
Party	Candidate	Votes	%
Republican	Matthew Morgan (incumbent)		
Democratic	Jennifer Clancy		
Write-in			
Total votes			

== District 29B ==
District 29B encompasses south St. Mary's County, including California, Scotland, and Lexington Park. Two-term Democratic incumbent Brian M. Crosby was re-elected with 55.8 percent of the vote in 2022.

=== Democratic primary ===
==== Nominee ====
- Adrianne Mathis, retired teacher

==== Eliminated in primary ====
- Kris McDonald, environmental resource technician

==== Declined ====
- Brian M. Crosby, incumbent state delegate

==== Results ====
Democratic primary results
Party	Candidate	Votes	%
Democratic	Adrianne Mathis	2,318	89.29%
Democratic	Kris McDonald	278	10.71%
Total votes		2,596	100.00%

=== Republican primary ===
==== Nominee ====
- BJ Hall, member of the St. Mary's County planning commission

==== Results ====
Republican primary results
Party	Candidate	Votes	%
Republican	BJ Hall	1,136	100.00%
Total votes		1,136	100.00%

=== General election ===
==== Results ====
2026 Maryland House of Delegates District 29B election
Party	Candidate	Votes	%
Democratic	Adrianne Mathis		
Republican	BJ Hall		
Write-in			
Total votes			

== District 29C ==
District 29C includes central St. Mary's and south Calvert counties, including Lusby, Beauvue, and Drayden. One-term Republican incumbent Todd Morgan was elected with 61.7 percent of the vote in 2022.

=== Republican primary ===
==== Nominee ====
- Todd Morgan, incumbent state delegate

==== Eliminated in primary ====
- James McQueen, member of the Calvert County Planning Commission

==== Results ====
Republican primary results
Party	Candidate	Votes	%
Republican	Todd Morgan (incumbent)	2,373	69.30%
Republican	James McQueen	1,051	30.70%
Total votes		3,424	100.00%

=== Democratic primary ===
==== Nominee ====
- Shaara Watts, consultant and property manager

==== Eliminated in primary ====
- J. W. Abney, cybersecurity and information technology contractor
- Mike Fechtmann, entrepreneur
- Eric Immler, video game development company director

==== Results ====
Results by precinct Watts: 30–40%; 40–50%; 50–60%; Abney: 30–40%; 40–50%; 50–60%

Democratic primary results
Party	Candidate	Votes	%
Democratic	Shaara Watts	1,193	41.74%
Democratic	J. W. Abney	1,006	35.20%
Democratic	Mike Fechtmann	488	17.07%
Democratic	Eric Immler	171	5.98%
Total votes		2,858	100.00%

=== General election ===
==== Results ====
2026 Maryland House of Delegates District 29C election
Party	Candidate	Votes	%
Republican	Todd Morgan (incumbent)		
Democratic	Shaara Watts		
Write-in			
Total votes			

== District 30A ==
District 30A includes the city of Annapolis and surrounding areas. Its Democratic incumbents, Shaneka Henson and Dana Jones, were reelected with a combined 63.2 percent of the vote in 2022. In January 2025, Henson was appointed to the Maryland Senate after Sarah Elfreth won election to the U.S. House of Representatives and Dylan Behler was appointed to serve the remainder of Henson's term in the House of Delegates.

=== Democratic primary ===
==== Nominees ====
- Dylan Behler, incumbent state delegate
- Dana Jones, incumbent state delegate

==== Eliminated in primary ====
- Bradley O'Neal, business owner

==== Results ====
Democratic primary results
Party	Candidate	Votes	%
Democratic	Dana Jones (incumbent)	8,168	50.22%
Democratic	Dylan Behler (incumbent)	5,957	36.62%
Democratic	Bradley O'Neal	2,141	13.16%
Total votes		16,266	100.00%

=== General election ===
==== Results ====
2026 Maryland House of Delegates District 30A election
Party	Candidate	Votes	%
Democratic	Dylan Behler (incumbent)		
Democratic	Dana Jones (incumbent)		
Write-in			
Total votes			

== District 30B ==
District 30B includes south Anne Arundel County, including Friendship, Lothian, and Galesville. Three-term Republican incumbent Seth A. Howard was re-elected with 56.7 percent of the vote in 2022.

=== Republican primary ===
==== Nominee ====
- Seth A. Howard, incumbent state delegate

==== Results ====
Republican primary results
Party	Candidate	Votes	%
Republican	Seth A. Howard (incumbent)	1,835	100.00%
Total votes		1,835	100.00%

=== Democratic primary ===
==== Nominee ====
- Matt Johnston, environmental policy analyst

==== Eliminated in primary ====
- Blake Wintermute, technical consultant

==== Results ====
Democratic primary results
Party	Candidate	Votes	%
Democratic	Matt Johnston	2,454	73.21%
Democratic	Blake Wintermute	898	26.79%
Total votes		3,352	100.00%

=== General election ===
==== Results ====
2026 Maryland House of Delegates District 30B election
Party	Candidate	Votes	%
Republican	Seth A. Howard (incumbent)		
Democratic	Matt Johnston		
Write-in			
Total votes			

== District 31 ==
The 31st district encompasses north Anne Arundel County, including Pasadena, Severn, and Gambrills. Its Republican incumbents—Nic Kipke, Brian Chisholm, and Rachel Muñoz—won with a combined 64.1 percent of the vote in 2022. In January 2025, Muñoz resigned from the House of Delegates, citing personal matters, and was succeeded by LaToya Nkongolo.

=== Republican primary ===
==== Nominees ====
- Brian Chisholm, incumbent state delegate
- Mike Jacobs, business owner
- LaToya Nkongolo, incumbent state delegate

==== Withdrew ====
- Lance Bowen, college professor

==== Declined ====
- Nic Kipke, incumbent state delegate (running for state senate)

==== Results ====
Republican primary results
Party	Candidate	Votes	%
Republican	Brian Chisholm (incumbent)	5,674	35.94%
Republican	Mike Jacobs	5,307	33.61%
Republican	LaToya Nkongolo (incumbent)	4,807	30.45%
Total votes		15,788	100.00%

=== Democratic primary ===
==== Nominees ====
- Joan Barone Cole, activist
- Heidi Schmidt, communications professional and member of the Anne Arundel County Democratic Central Committee
- Ryan Shaban, cybersecurity professional and U.S. Army veteran

==== Results ====
Democratic primary results
Party	Candidate	Votes	%
Democratic	Heidi Schmidt	7,027	34.14%
Democratic	Joan Barone Cole	6,990	33.96%
Democratic	Ryan Shaban	6,565	31.90%
Total votes		20,582	100.00%

=== General election ===
==== Results ====
2026 Maryland House of Delegates District 31 election
Party	Candidate	Votes	%
Republican	Brian Chisholm (incumbent)		
Republican	Mike Jacobs		
Republican	LaToya Nkongolo (incumbent)		
Democratic	Joan Barone Cole		
Democratic	Heidi Schmidt		
Democratic	Ryan Shaban		
Write-in			
Total votes			

== District 32 ==
The 32nd district encompasses part of north Anne Arundel County, including Glen Burnie and Fort Meade. Its Democratic incumbents—Mark S. Chang, J. Sandy Bartlett, and Mike Rogers—won with a combined 65.2 percent of the vote in 2022.

=== Democratic primary ===
==== Nominees ====
- J. Sandy Bartlett, incumbent state delegate
- Spencer Dixon, former legislative director to state senator Dawn Gile (2023–2025)
- Mike Rogers, incumbent state delegate

==== Eliminated in primary ====
- Steven Thomas, police lieutenant

==== Withdrew ====
- Mark S. Chang, incumbent state delegate (running for state senate, endorsed Dixon)

==== Results ====
Democratic primary results
Party	Candidate	Votes	%
Democratic	J. Sandy Bartlett (incumbent)	7,490	29.90%
Democratic	Mike Rogers (incumbent)	7,140	28.50%
Democratic	Spencer Dixon	6,319	25.22%
Democratic	Steven Thomas	4,103	16.38%
Total votes		25,052	100.00%

=== Republican primary ===
==== Nominees ====
- Colin McEvers, chair of the Maryland Federation of College Republicans
- Mary Phelps, technology coordinator
- Marcus Snipes

==== Results ====
Republican primary results
Party	Candidate	Votes	%
Republican	Mary Phelps	2,162	34.85%
Republican	Colin McEvers	2,096	33.79%
Republican	Marcus Snipes	1,945	31.36%
Total votes		6,203	100.00%

=== General election ===
==== Results ====
2026 Maryland House of Delegates District 32 election
Party	Candidate	Votes	%
Democratic	J. Sandy Bartlett (incumbent)		
Democratic	Spencer Dixon		
Democratic	Mike Rogers (incumbent)		
Republican	Colin McEvers		
Republican	Mary Phelps		
Republican	Marcus Snipes		
Write-in			
Total votes			

== District 33A ==
District 33A encompasses part of Anne Arundel County, including parts of Odenton and Gambrills. One-term Democratic incumbent Andrew Pruski was elected with 67.2 percent of the vote in 2022.

=== Democratic primary ===
==== Nominee ====
- Andrew Pruski, incumbent state delegate

==== Eliminated in primary ====
- Connor Roche

==== Results ====
Democratic primary results
Party	Candidate	Votes	%
Democratic	Andrew Pruski (incumbent)	3,542	89.26%
Democratic	Connor Roche	426	10.74%
Total votes		3,968	100.00%

=== General election ===
==== Results ====
2026 Maryland House of Delegates District 33A election
Party	Candidate	Votes	%
Democratic	Andrew Pruski (incumbent)		
Write-in			
Total votes			

== District 33B ==
District 33B encompasses part of Anne Arundel County, including Crofton, Davidsonville, and Crownsville. It is one of two Republican-held districts to be won by Democratic Governor Wes Moore in the 2022 Maryland gubernatorial election and Vice President Kamala Harris in the 2024 United States presidential election in Maryland, (Note: In District 33B, Democratic nominee Wes Moore received 55.1 percent of the vote, while Republican nominee Dan Cox received 40.8 percent. Additionally, Democratic Vice President Kamala Harris received 52.1 percent of the vote in this district during the 2024 presidential election, while Republican former president Donald Trump received 44.0 percent of the vote.) with one-term Republican incumbent Stuart Schmidt Jr. having won it with 50.7 percent of the vote in 2022.

=== Republican primary ===
==== Nominee ====
- Stuart Schmidt Jr., incumbent state delegate

==== Results ====
Republican primary results
Party	Candidate	Votes	%
Republican	Stuart Schmidt Jr. (incumbent)	1,846	100.00%
Total votes		1,846	100.00%

=== Democratic primary ===
==== Nominee ====
- Chuck Cook, chief legislative officer of the Maryland Department of Housing and Community Development

==== Withdrew ====
- Luis da Conceicao, physician

==== Results ====
Democratic primary results
Party	Candidate	Votes	%
Democratic	Chuck Cook	3,949	100.00%
Total votes		3,949	100.00%

=== General election ===
==== Results ====
2026 Maryland House of Delegates District 33B election
Party	Candidate	Votes	%
Republican	Stuart Schmidt Jr. (incumbent)		
Democratic	Chuck Cook		
Write-in			
Total votes			

== District 33C ==
District 33C encompasses part of Anne Arundel County, including Cape Saint Claire and Severna Park. Two-term Democratic incumbent Heather Bagnall was re-elected with 54.1 percent of the vote in 2022.

=== Democratic primary ===
==== Nominee ====
- Heather Bagnall, incumbent state delegate

==== Results ====
Democratic primary results
Party	Candidate	Votes	%
Democratic	Heather Bagnall (incumbent)	3,768	100.00%
Total votes		3,768	100.00%

=== Republican primary ===
==== Nominee ====
- Kristin Norris, nurse

==== Results ====
Republican primary results
Party	Candidate	Votes	%
Republican	Kristin Norris	1,506	100.00%
Total votes		1,506	100.00%

=== General election ===
==== Results ====
2026 Maryland House of Delegates District 33C election
Party	Candidate	Votes	%
Democratic	Heather Bagnall (incumbent)		
Republican	Kristin Norris		
Write-in			
Total votes			

== District 34A ==
District 34A encompasses south Harford County, including Edgewood, Aberdeen, and Havre de Grace. Its Democratic incumbents, Andre Johnson Jr. and Steven C. Johnson, won with a combined 56.0 percent of the vote in 2022.

=== Democratic primary ===
==== Nominees ====
- Andre Johnson Jr., incumbent state delegate
- Steven C. Johnson, incumbent state delegate

==== Results ====
Democratic primary results
Party	Candidate	Votes	%
Democratic	Andre Johnson Jr. (incumbent)	5,461	53.64%
Democratic	Steven C. Johnson (incumbent)	4,719	46.36%
Total votes		10,180	100.00%

=== Republican primary ===
==== Nominee ====
- Elliott Joseph Herneker, chair of the Harford County Young Republicans

==== Results ====
Republican primary results
Party	Candidate	Votes	%
Republican	Elliott Joseph Herneker	3,120	100.00%
Total votes		3,120	100.00%

=== General election ===
==== Results ====
2026 Maryland House of Delegates District 34A election
Party	Candidate	Votes	%
Democratic	Andre Johnson Jr. (incumbent)		
Democratic	Steven C. Johnson (incumbent)		
Republican	Elliott Joseph Herneker		
Write-in			
Total votes			

== District 34B ==
District 34B encompasses part of Harford County, including Bel Air, Glenwood, and Constant Friendship. Republican incumbent Susan K. McComas was re-elected to a sixth term with 60.8 percent of the vote in 2022.

=== Republican primary ===
==== Nominee ====
- Jake Taylor, Bel Air town commissioner (2023–present)

==== Eliminated in primary ====
- Sheariah Yousefi, former chief of staff to state delegate Mike Griffith

==== Withdrew ====
- Susan McComas, incumbent state delegate (endorsed Taylor)

==== Results ====
Republican primary results
Party	Candidate	Votes	%
Republican	Jake Taylor	2,250	51.80%
Republican	Sheariah Yousefi	2,094	48.20%
Total votes		4,344	100.00%

=== Democratic primary ===
==== Nominee ====
- Anthony Lyon, former member of the Harford County Democratic Central Committee

==== Withdrew ====
- Terrence Rogers, pastor (running for Harford County sheriff)

==== Results ====
Democratic primary results
Party	Candidate	Votes	%
Democratic	Anthony Lyon	2,551	100.00%
Total votes		2,551	100.00%

=== General election ===
==== Results ====
2026 Maryland House of Delegates District 34B election
Party	Candidate	Votes	%
Republican	Jake Taylor		
Democratic	Anthony Lyon		
Write-in			
Total votes			

== District 35A ==
District 35A encompasses most of Harford County, including Churchville, Pylesville, and Hickory, and part of Cecil County. Its Republican incumbents, Mike Griffith and Teresa E. Reilly, won with a combined 97.7 percent of the vote in 2022.

=== Republican primary ===
==== Nominee ====
- Mike Griffith, incumbent state delegate
- Teresa E. Reilly, incumbent state delegate

==== Eliminated in primary ====
- Michelle Christman, chiropractic assistant and candidate for SD-35 in 2022

==== Results ====
Republican primary results
Party	Candidate	Votes	%
Republican	Mike Griffith (incumbent)	7,596	41.86%
Republican	Teresa E. Reilly (incumbent)	6,916	38.11%
Republican	Michelle Christman	3,636	20.04%
Total votes		18,148	100.00%

=== Democratic primary ===
==== Nominees ====
- Gregory V. Anderson
- Michael Eckels, minister

==== Results ====
Democratic primary results
Party	Candidate	Votes	%
Democratic	Gregory V. Anderson	3,335	50.45%
Democratic	Michael Eckels	3,276	49.55%
Total votes		6,611	100.00%

=== General election ===
==== Results ====
2026 Maryland House of Delegates District 35A election
Party	Candidate	Votes	%
Republican	Mike Griffith (incumbent)		
Republican	Teresa E. Reilly (incumbent)		
Democratic	Gregory V. Anderson		
Democratic	Michael Eckels		
Write-in			
Total votes			

== District 35B ==
District 35B encompasses part of Cecil County, including Rising Sun and North East. Three-term Republican incumbent Kevin Hornberger was re-elected with 95.6 percent of the vote in 2022.

=== Republican primary ===
==== Nominee ====
- Derek Howell, attorney and former Maryland State Police officer

==== Eliminated in primary ====
- Erica Berge, community organizer
- Kevin Hornberger, incumbent state delegate

==== Withdrew ====
- Michelle Christman, chiropractic assistant and candidate for SD-35 in 2022 (ran in district 35A)

==== Results ====
Results by precinct Howell: 30–40%; 40–50%; 50–60%; Berge: 30–40%; Hornberger: 30–40%

Republican primary results
Party	Candidate	Votes	%
Republican	Derek Howell	1,697	40.04%
Republican	Erica Berge	1,375	32.44%
Republican	Kevin Hornberger (incumbent)	1,166	27.51%
Total votes		4,238	100.00%

=== Democratic primary ===
==== Nominee ====
- Blessing Oluwadare, customer service agent and candidate for MD-01 in 2024

=== General election ===
==== Results ====
2026 Maryland House of Delegates District 35B election
Party	Candidate	Votes	%
Republican	Derek Howell		
Democratic	Blessing Oluwadare		
Write-in			
Total votes			

== District 36 ==
The 36th district encompasses all of Kent and Queen Anne's counties, and parts of Cecil and Caroline counties, including Elkton. Its Republican incumbents—Jefferson L. Ghrist, Jay Jacobs, and Steven J. Arentz—won with a combined 97.4 percent of the vote in 2022.

=== Republican primary ===
==== Nominees ====
- Steven J. Arentz, incumbent state delegate
- Jefferson L. Ghrist, incumbent state delegate
- Jay Jacobs, incumbent state delegate

==== Results ====
Republican primary results
Party	Candidate	Votes	%
Republican	Steven J. Arentz (incumbent)	7,684	33.59%
Republican	Jay Jacobs (incumbent)	7,641	33.40%
Republican	Jefferson L. Ghrist (incumbent)	7,550	33.01%
Total votes		22,875	100.00%

=== Democratic primary ===
==== Nominees ====
- Nevin Crouse, Chesapeake College assistant professor
- Michelle Ravert, parole agent
- Crystal Woodward, George Washington University faculty member and nominee for this district in 2018

==== Results ====
Democratic primary results
Party	Candidate	Votes	%
Democratic	Crystal Woodward	5,772	33.74%
Democratic	Michelle Ravert	5,705	33.35%
Democratic	Nevin Crouse	5,629	32.91%
Total votes		17,106	100.00%

=== General election ===
==== Results ====
2026 Maryland House of Delegates District 36 election
Party	Candidate	Votes	%
Republican	Steven J. Arentz (incumbent)		
Republican	Jefferson L. Ghrist (incumbent)		
Republican	Jay Jacobs (incumbent)		
Democratic	Nevin Crouse		
Democratic	Michelle Ravert		
Democratic	Crystal Woodward		
Write-in			
Total votes			

== District 37A ==
District 37A encompasses parts of Wicomico and Dorchester counties, including Salisbury, Hebron, and Cambridge. Three-term Democratic incumbent Sheree Sample-Hughes was re-elected with 61.9 percent of the vote in 2022.

=== Democratic primary ===
==== Nominee ====
- Sheree Sample-Hughes, incumbent state delegate

==== Results ====
Democratic primary results
Party	Candidate	Votes	%
Democratic	Sheree Sample-Hughes (incumbent)	2,470	100.00%
Total votes		2,470	100.00%

=== General election ===
==== Results ====
2026 Maryland House of Delegates District 37A election
Party	Candidate	Votes	%
Democratic	Sheree Sample-Hughes (incumbent)		
Write-in			
Total votes			

== District 37B ==
District 37B encompasses all of Talbot County and parts of Caroline, Dorchester, and Wicomico counties. Its Republican incumbents, Christopher T. Adams and Tom Hutchinson, won with a combined 73.2 percent of the vote in 2022.

=== Republican primary ===
==== Nominees ====
- Christopher T. Adams, incumbent state delegate
- Tom Hutchinson, incumbent state delegate

==== Results ====
Republican primary results
Party	Candidate	Votes	%
Republican	Tom Hutchinson (incumbent)	7,209	50.61%
Republican	Christopher T. Adams (incumbent)	7,034	49.39%
Total votes		14,243	100.00%

=== Democratic primary ===
==== Nominees ====
- Edmund Barrett, U.S. Army veteran and candidate for SD-37 in 2026
- Michele Johnson, director of the Maryland 250 Commission

==== Withdrew after nomination ====
- Marco Garcia, radio personality

==== Results ====
Democratic primary results
Party	Candidate	Votes	%
Democratic	Michele Johnson	5,344	53.20%
Democratic	Marco Garcia	4,700	46.80%
Total votes		10,044	100.00%

=== General election ===
==== Results ====
2026 Maryland House of Delegates District 37B election
Party	Candidate	Votes	%
Republican	Christopher T. Adams (incumbent)		
Republican	Tom Hutchinson (incumbent)		
Democratic	Edmund Barrett		
Democratic	Michele Johnson		
Write-in			
Total votes			

== District 38A ==
District 38A encompasses all of Somerset County and parts of Worcester and Wicomico counties, including Berlin, Princess Anne, and Pocomoke City. Republican Charles J. Otto was re-elected to a fourth term with 63.2 percent of the vote in 2022. Otto died on October 17, 2025, after which the Republican central committees in Somerset, Worcester, and Wicomico counties nominated Kevin Anderson to serve the remainder of Otto's term.

=== Republican primary ===
==== Nominee ====
- C. L. Marshall, Pocomoke City councilmember (2024–present)

==== Eliminated in primary ====
- Timothy Howlett, HVAC business owner and U.S. Coast Guard veteran

==== Declined ====
- Kevin Anderson, incumbent state delegate

==== Results ====
Results by precinct Marshall: 50–60%; 60–70%; 70–80%; 80–90%; >90%; Howlett: 50–60%; 60–70%; 70–80%; 80–90%

Republican primary results
Party	Candidate	Votes	%
Republican	C. L. Marshall III	2,334	57.82%
Republican	Timothy Howlett	1,703	42.18%
Total votes		4,037	100.00%

=== Democratic primary ===
==== Nominee ====
- Shelley Johnson, at-large Princess Anne town commissioner

==== Results ====
Democratic primary results
Party	Candidate	Votes	%
Democratic	Shelley Johnson	2,480	100.00%
Total votes		2,480	100.00%

=== General election ===
==== Results ====
2026 Maryland House of Delegates District 38A election
Party	Candidate	Votes	%
Republican	C. L. Marshall III		
Democratic	Shelley Johnson		
Write-in			
Total votes			

== District 38B ==
District 38B includes the city of Salisbury in Wicomico County. It is one of two Republican-held districts to be won by Democratic Governor Wes Moore in the 2022 Maryland gubernatorial election and Vice President Kamala Harris in the 2024 United States presidential election in Maryland, (Note: In District 38B, Democratic nominee Wes Moore received 52.3 percent of the vote, while Republican nominee Dan Cox received 44.0 percent. Additionally, Vice President Kamala Harris received 52.1 percent of the vote in the district during the 2024 presidential election, while Republican former president Donald Trump received 45.0 percent of the vote.) making it a target for the Maryland Democratic Party.

Three-term Republican incumbent Carl Anderton Jr. was re-elected with 94.5 percent of the vote in 2022, but resigned in July 2024 to become the director of rural strategy within the Maryland Department of Commerce. Barry Beauchamp was nominated by the Wicomico County Republican Central Committee to succeed Anderton and sworn into the House of Delegates in August 2024.

=== Republican primary ===
==== Nominee ====
- Barry Beauchamp, incumbent state delegate

==== Results ====
Republican primary results
Party	Candidate	Votes	%
Republican	Barry Beauchamp (incumbent)	1,826	100.00%
Total votes		1,826	100.00%

=== Democratic primary ===
==== Nominee ====
- Josh Hastings, county councilmember from the 4th district (2018–present)

==== Results ====
Democratic primary results
Party	Candidate	Votes	%
Democratic	Josh Hastings	2,159	100.00%
Total votes		2,159	100.00%

=== General election ===
==== Results ====
2026 Maryland House of Delegates District 38B election
Party	Candidate	Votes	%
Republican	Barry Beauchamp (incumbent)		
Democratic	Josh Hastings		
Write-in			
Total votes			

== District 38C ==
District 38C includes east Wicomico County and most of Worcester County, including Pittsville, Ocean City, and Assateague Island. Two-term Republican incumbent Wayne A. Hartman was re-elected with 97.8 percent of the vote in 2022.

=== Republican primary ===
==== Nominee ====
- Wayne A. Hartman, incumbent state delegate

==== Results ====
Republican primary results
Party	Candidate	Votes	%
Republican	Wayne A. Hartman (incumbent)	4,120	100.00%
Total votes		4,120	100.00%

=== Democratic primary ===
==== Withdrew after nomination ====
- Laurie Anne Brittingham, member of the Maryland State Democratic Central Committee

==== Results ====
Democratic primary results
Party	Candidate	Votes	%
Democratic	Laurie Anne Brittingham	2,125	100.00%
Total votes		2,125	100.00%

=== General election ===
==== Results ====
2026 Maryland House of Delegates District 38C election
Party	Candidate	Votes	%
Republican	Wayne A. Hartman (incumbent)		
Write-in			
Total votes			

== District 39 ==
The 39th district includes Montgomery Village and parts of Germantown and Clarksburg. Its Democratic incumbents—Gabriel Acevero, Lesley Lopez, and Kirill Reznik—won with a combined 98.2 percent of the vote in 2022. Reznik resigned from the legislature to become the assistant secretary or inter-departmental data integration within the Maryland Department of Human Services in March 2023, and was succeeded by W. Gregory Wims.

=== Democratic primary ===
==== Nominees ====
- Gabriel Acevero, incumbent state delegate
- Lesley Lopez, incumbent state delegate
- W. Gregory Wims, incumbent state delegate

==== Eliminated in primary ====
- George Lluberes, vice chair of the Montgomery County Police Accountability Board
- Robert Wu, Gaithersburg city councilor (2015–present)

==== Withdrew ====
- Amar Mukunda, U.S. Army reservist, gun control activist, and entrepreneur (running for state senate)

==== Results ====
Democratic primary results
Party	Candidate	Votes	%
Democratic	Lesley Lopez (incumbent)	7,715	25.88%
Democratic	Gabriel Acevero (incumbent)	7,184	24.10%
Democratic	W. Gregory Wims (incumbent)	6,700	22.47%
Democratic	Robert Wu	5,701	19.12%
Democratic	George Lluberes	2,513	8.43%
Total votes		29,813	100.00%

=== General election ===
==== Results ====
2026 Maryland House of Delegates District 39 election
Party	Candidate	Votes	%
Democratic	Gabriel Acevero (incumbent)		
Democratic	Lesley Lopez (incumbent)		
Democratic	W. Gregory Wims (incumbent)		
Write-in			
Total votes			

== District 40 ==
The 40th district encompasses communities in west Baltimore, including Morrell Park, Sandtown-Winchester, and Greenspring. Its Democratic incumbents—Melissa Wells, Frank M. Conaway Jr., and Marlon Amprey—won with a combined 95.0 percent of the vote in 2022.

=== Democratic primary ===
==== Nominees ====
- Marlon Amprey, incumbent state delegate
- Tiffany Welch, community activist
- Melissa Wells, incumbent state delegate

==== Eliminated in primary ====
- Frank M. Conaway Jr., incumbent state delegate
- Dianté Edwards, cybersecurity consultant and U.S. Navy veteran
- Anderson Jean
- Kevin Legacy
- Crystal Jackson Parker, nonprofit executive

==== Results ====
Democratic primary results
Party	Candidate	Votes	%
Democratic	Marlon Amprey (incumbent)	7,236	22.02%
Democratic	Melissa Wells (incumbent)	7,219	21.97%
Democratic	Tiffany Welch	7,165	21.81%
Democratic	Crystal Jackson Parker	3,460	10.53%
Democratic	Frank M. Conaway Jr. (incumbent)	3,280	9.98%
Democratic	Dianté Edwards	2,896	8.81%
Democratic	Anderson Jean	1,007	3.06%
Democratic	Kevin Legacy	593	1.81%
Total votes		32,856	100.00%

=== General election ===
==== Results ====
2026 Maryland House of Delegates District 40 election
Party	Candidate	Votes	%
Democratic	Marlon Amprey (incumbent)		
Democratic	Tiffany Welch		
Democratic	Melissa Wells (incumbent)		
Write-in			
Total votes			

== District 41 ==
The 41st district encompasses communities in west Baltimore, including Wyndhurst, Yale Heights, and Edmondson. Its Democratic incumbents—Dalya Attar, Samuel I. Rosenberg, and Tony Bridges—won with a combined 94.5 percent of the vote in 2022. Bridges resigned from the legislature to become the assistant secretary of the Maryland Department of Transportation in May 2023, and was succeeded by Malcolm Ruff; and Attar was appointed to the Maryland Senate following the resignation of Jill P. Carter in January 2025, and was succeeded by Sean Stinnett.

=== Democratic primary ===
==== Nominees ====
- Samuel I. Rosenberg, incumbent state delegate
- Sean Stinnett, incumbent state delegate
- Ryan Turner, nonprofit executive

==== Eliminated in primary ====
- Reuven Amos
- Shannice Anderson, community engagement coordinator of the Maryland Office of the Public Defender
- Chezia Cager, former chief of staff to Baltimore mayor Brandon Scott (2022–2023)
- Matt Menter, marketer
- Adrian Muldrow, consultant

==== Declined ====
- Malcolm Ruff, incumbent state delegate (running for state senate, endorsed Cager)

==== Results ====
Democratic primary results
Party	Candidate	Votes	%
Democratic	Samuel I. Rosenberg (incumbent)	11,194	23.32%
Democratic	Sean Stinnett (incumbent)	9,399	19.58%
Democratic	Ryan Turner	6,853	14.28%
Democratic	Shannice Anderson	6,547	13.64%
Democratic	Chezia Cager	5,427	11.31%
Democratic	Matt Menter	3,133	6.53%
Democratic	Adrian Muldrow	2,774	5.78%
Democratic	Reuven Amos	2,669	5.56%
Total votes		47,996	100.00%

=== General election ===
==== Results ====
2026 Maryland House of Delegates District 41 election
Party	Candidate	Votes	%
Democratic	Samuel I. Rosenberg (incumbent)		
Democratic	Sean Stinnett (incumbent)		
Democratic	Ryan Turner		
Write-in			
Total votes			

== District 42A ==
District 42A encompasses north Baltimore County, including Glencoe, Hereford, and Phoenix. Two-term Republican incumbent Nino Mangione, who was re-elected with 58.6 percent of the vote in 2022, announced in November 2024 that he would run for the Baltimore County Council in 2026. He resigned from the Maryland House of Delegates on June 1, 2026, after being appointed to the Baltimore County Council following the resignation of councilmember Wade Kach.

=== Republican primary ===
==== Nominee ====
- Chuck Murphy, credit risk analyst

==== Eliminated in primary ====
- Alex Harlan, assistant chief of staff for state senator Chris West (appointed to serve the remainder of Mangione's term following the primary elections)
- Dan Katz, Maryland State Police official

==== Declined ====
- Nino Mangione, member of the Baltimore County Council from the 3rd district (2026–present) and former state delegate from district 42A (2019–2026) (running for Baltimore County Council, endorsed Murphy)

==== Results ====
Results by precinct Murphy: 30–40%; 40–50%; 60–70%; Katz: 30–40%; 40–50%; Harlan: 30–40%; 40–50%; 50–60%; Tie 30–40%

Republican primary results
Party	Candidate	Votes	%
Republican	Chuck Murphy	1,391	34.06%
Republican	Dan Katz	1,383	33.86%
Republican	Alex Harlan	1,310	32.08%
Total votes		4,084	100.00%

=== Democratic primary ===
==== Nominee ====
- Jyoti Mohan, history professor and nonprofit organizer

==== Results ====
Democratic primary results
Party	Candidate	Votes	%
Democratic	Jyoti Mohan	3,141	100.00%
Total votes		3,141	100.00%

=== General election ===
==== Results ====
2026 Maryland House of Delegates District 42A election
Party	Candidate	Votes	%
Republican	Chuck Murphy		
Democratic	Jyoti Mohan		
Write-in			
Total votes			

== District 42B ==
District 42B includes communities in central Baltimore County, including Timonium, Hampton, and Phoenix. Two-term Democratic incumbent Michele Guyton was re-elected with 61.3 percent of the vote in 2022.

=== Democratic primary ===
==== Nominee ====
- Michele Guyton, incumbent state delegate

==== Results ====
Democratic primary results
Party	Candidate	Votes	%
Democratic	Michele Guyton (incumbent)	3,509	100.00%
Total votes		3,509	100.00%

=== Republican primary ===
==== Nominee ====
- Jeffry McDonald

==== Eliminated in primary ====
- Larry Novak

==== Results ====
Republican primary results
Party	Candidate	Votes	%
Republican	Jeffry McDonald	1,056	66.17%
Republican	Larry Novak	540	33.83%
Total votes		1,596	100.00%

=== General election ===
==== Results ====
2026 Maryland House of Delegates District 42B election
Party	Candidate	Votes	%
Democratic	Michele Guyton (incumbent)		
Republican	Jeffry McDonald		
Write-in			
Total votes			

== District 42C ==
District 42C encompasses east Carroll County, including Hampstead, Finksburg, and Mexico. One-term Republican incumbent Joshua Stonko was elected with 97.6 percent of the vote in 2022.

=== Republican primary ===
==== Nominee ====
- Steve Patten, business owner

==== Declined ====
- Joshua Stonko, incumbent state delegate (endorsed Patten)

==== Results ====
Republican primary results
Party	Candidate	Votes	%
Republican	Steve Patten	3,635	100.00%
Total votes		3,635	100.00%

=== Democratic primary ===
==== Nominee ====
- Corynne Courpas, vice chair of the Carroll County Democratic Central Committee

==== Results ====
Democratic primary results
Party	Candidate	Votes	%
Democratic	Corynne Courpas	1,767	100.00%
Total votes		1,767	100.00%

=== General election ===
==== Results ====
2026 Maryland House of Delegates District 42C election
Party	Candidate	Votes	%
Republican	Steve Patten		
Democratic	Corynne Courpas		
Write-in			
Total votes			

== District 43A ==
District 43A encompasses neighborhoods in north Baltimore, including Glen Oaks, Charles Village, and Northwood. Its Democratic incumbents, Regina T. Boyce and Elizabeth Embry, won with a combined 92.1 percent of the vote in 2022.

=== Democratic primary ===
==== Nominees ====
- Regina T. Boyce, incumbent state delegate
- Elizabeth Embry, incumbent state delegate

==== Results ====
Democratic primary results
Party	Candidate	Votes	%
Democratic	Regina T. Boyce (incumbent)	9,837	51.30%
Democratic	Elizabeth Embry (incumbent)	9,339	48.70%
Total votes		19,176	100.00%

=== General election ===
==== Results ====
2026 Maryland House of Delegates District 43A election
Party	Candidate	Votes	%
Democratic	Regina T. Boyce (incumbent)		
Democratic	Elizabeth Embry (incumbent)		
Write-in			
Total votes			

== District 43B ==
District 43B encompasses the city of Towson in central Baltimore County. One-term Democratic incumbent Cathi Forbes was elected with 98.0 percent of the vote in 2022.

=== Democratic primary ===
==== Nominee ====
- Cathi Forbes, incumbent state delegate

==== Results ====
Democratic primary results
Party	Candidate	Votes	%
Democratic	Cathi Forbes (incumbent)	4,241	100.00%
Total votes		4,241	100.00%

=== General election ===
==== Results ====
2026 Maryland House of Delegates District 43B election
Party	Candidate	Votes	%
Democratic	Cathi Forbes (incumbent)		
Write-in			
Total votes			

== District 44A ==
District 44A encompasses part of Baltimore County, including Baltimore Highlands and Catonsville. Three-term Democratic incumbent Eric Ebersole was re-elected with 62.4 percent of the vote in 2022.

=== Democratic primary ===
==== Nominee ====
- Eric Ebersole, incumbent state delegate

==== Results ====
Democratic primary results
Party	Candidate	Votes	%
Democratic	Eric Ebersole (incumbent)	3,058	100.00%
Total votes		3,058	100.00%

=== Republican primary ===
==== Nominee ====
- Chuck Linton

==== Results ====
Republican primary results
Party	Candidate	Votes	%
Republican	Chuck Linton	757	100.00%
Total votes		757	100.00%

=== General election ===
==== Results ====
2026 Maryland House of Delegates District 44A election
Party	Candidate	Votes	%
Democratic	Eric Ebersole (incumbent)		
Republican	Chuck Linton		
Write-in			
Total votes			

== District 44B ==
District 44B includes neighborhoods in southwest Baltimore County, including Woodlawn, Arbutus, and Catonsville. Its Democratic incumbents, Sheila Ruth and Aletheia McCaskill, won with a combined 98.6 percent of the vote in 2022.

=== Democratic primary ===
==== Nominees ====
- Aletheia McCaskill, incumbent state delegate
- Sheila Ruth, incumbent state delegate

==== Eliminated in primary ====
- Bishop Chapman, candidate for this district in 2018 and 2022
- Sherry Scipio, hair stylist

==== Results ====
Democratic primary results
Party	Candidate	Votes	%
Democratic	Aletheia McCaskill (incumbent)	8,105	37.73%
Democratic	Sheila Ruth (incumbent)	7,852	36.55%
Democratic	Bishop Chapman	4,016	18.69%
Democratic	Sherry Scipio	1,511	7.03%
Total votes		21,484	100.00%

=== Republican primary ===
==== Nominee ====
- Domonic Martin

==== Results ====
Republican primary results
Party	Candidate	Votes	%
Republican	Domonic Martin	904	100.00%
Total votes		904	100.00%

=== General election ===
==== Results ====
2026 Maryland House of Delegates District 44B election
Party	Candidate	Votes	%
Democratic	Aletheia McCaskill (incumbent)		
Democratic	Sheila Ruth (incumbent)		
Republican	Domonic Martin		
Write-in			
Total votes			

== District 45 ==
The 45th district encompasses neighborhoods in central and east Baltimore, including Broadway East, Frankford, and Armistead Gardens. Its Democratic incumbents—Stephanie M. Smith, Jackie Addison, and Caylin Young—won with a combined 94.2 percent of the vote in 2022.

=== Democratic primary ===
==== Nominees ====
- Jackie Addison, incumbent state delegate
- Chanel Branch, former state delegate (2020–2023)
- Caylin Young, incumbent state delegate

==== Eliminated in primary ====
- George Johnson, candidate for this district in 2022
- Stephanie M. Smith, incumbent state delegate
- Robert Stokes Sr., former Baltimore city councilor (2016–2024)

==== Results ====
Democratic primary results
Party	Candidate	Votes	%
Democratic	Jackie Addison (incumbent)	7,620	22.68%
Democratic	Caylin Young (incumbent)	7,225	21.51%
Democratic	Chanel Branch	6,843	20.37%
Democratic	Stephanie M. Smith (incumbent)	6,544	19.48%
Democratic	Robert Stokes Sr.	4,374	13.02%
Democratic	George Johnson	988	2.94%
Total votes		33,594	100.00%

=== Third-party and independent candidates ===
==== Declared ====
- Renaud De'Aundre Brown (Green), teacher and perennial candidate

==== Disqualified ====
- Nichole McDonald (Independent)

=== General election ===
==== Results ====
2026 Maryland House of Delegates District 45 election
Party	Candidate	Votes	%
Democratic	Jackie Addison (incumbent)		
Democratic	Chanel Branch		
Democratic	Caylin Young (incumbent)		
Green	Renaud De'Aundre Brown		
Write-in			
Total votes			

== District 46 ==
The 46th district encompasses neighborhoods in central and south Baltimore, including the Inner Harbor, Bayview, and Curtis Bay. Its Democratic incumbents—Luke Clippinger, Robbyn Lewis, and Mark Edelson—won with a combined 92.0 percent of the vote in 2022.

=== Democratic primary ===
==== Nominees ====
- Luke Clippinger, incumbent state delegate
- Mark Edelson, incumbent state delegate
- Robbyn Lewis, incumbent state delegate

==== Results ====
Democratic primary results
Party	Candidate	Votes	%
Democratic	Luke Clippinger (incumbent)	9,678	33.71%
Democratic	Robbyn Lewis (incumbent)	9,661	33.65%
Democratic	Mark Edelson (incumbent)	9,369	32.64%
Total votes		28,708	100.00%

=== Republican primary ===
==== Nominee ====
- Jeremy Amason, policy consultant

==== Results ====
Republican primary results
Party	Candidate	Votes	%
Republican	Jeremy Amason	534	100.00%
Total votes		534	100.00%

=== General election ===
==== Results ====
2026 Maryland House of Delegates District 46 election
Party	Candidate	Votes	%
Democratic	Luke Clippinger (incumbent)		
Democratic	Mark Edelson (incumbent)		
Democratic	Robbyn Lewis (incumbent)		
Republican	Jeremy Amason		
Write-in			
Total votes			

== District 47A ==
District 47A includes several Prince George's County communities, including Landover, Chillum, and Mount Rainier. Its Democratic incumbents, Julian Ivey and Diana M. Fennell, won with a combined 99.0 percent of the vote in 2022.

=== Democratic primary ===
==== Nominees ====
- Diana Fennell, incumbent state delegate
- Julian Ivey, incumbent state delegate

==== Eliminated in primary ====
- Rocio Treminio-Lopez, mayor of Brentwood (2014–present) and candidate for SD-47 in 2022

==== Results ====
Democratic primary results
Party	Candidate	Votes	%
Democratic	Julian Ivey (incumbent)	5,019	43.91%
Democratic	Diana Fennell (incumbent)	4,799	41.99%
Democratic	Rocio Treminio-Lopez	1,611	14.10%
Total votes		11,429	100.00%

=== Republican primary ===
==== Nominee ====
- Fred Price, perennial candidate

==== Results ====
Republican primary results
Party	Candidate	Votes	%
Republican	Fred Price	157	100.00%
Total votes		157	100.00%

=== General election ===
==== Results ====
2026 Maryland House of Delegates District 47A election
Party	Candidate	Votes	%
Democratic	Diana Fennell (incumbent)		
Democratic	Julian Ivey (incumbent)		
Republican	Fred Price		
Write-in			
Total votes			

== District 47B ==
District 47B includes several Prince George's County communities, including Langley Park, University Park, and Adelphi. One-term Democratic incumbent Deni Taveras was elected with 98.1 percent of the vote in 2022.

=== Democratic primary ===
==== Nominee ====
- Deni Taveras, incumbent state delegate

==== Results ====
Democratic primary results
Party	Candidate	Votes	%
Democratic	Deni Taveras (incumbent)	1,457	100.00%
Total votes		1,457	100.00%

=== General election ===
==== Results ====
2026 Maryland House of Delegates District 47B election
Party	Candidate	Votes	%
Democratic	Deni Taveras (incumbent)		
Write-in			
Total votes			
