= Abena Affum-McAllister =

American politician

Member-elect of the Maryland House of Delegates from the 28th district
- Assuming office January 13, 2027
- Succeeding: C. T. Wilson

Personal details
- Party: Democratic
- Children: 1

Abena Affum-McAllister is an American politician who is a member-elect of the Maryland House of Delegates from the 28th district. She previously served as the deputy secretary of the Maryland Democratic Party.

== Early life and education ==
Affum-McAllister was born and raised in New York. She is of Ghanaian descent. She graduated from Nyack College, earning a Bachelor's degree with cum laude honors in 2007, and the University of the District of Columbia, where she earned a Juris Doctorate in 2013.

== Career ==
In December 2014, Affum-McAllister was appointed to the Charles County Democratic Central Committee. In December 2018, she was elected to serve as the deputy secretary of the Maryland Democratic Party. She was an at-large delegate to the 2020 Democratic National Convention, pledged to former Vice President Joe Biden.

Affum-McAllister was elected to the Maryland House of Delegates in 2026, winning the Democratic primary on June 23, 2026, and defeating Republican nominees James Ashburn and Winfield Clark in the general election. She was assigned to the Appropriations Committee.

== Personal life ==
Abena is married to her husband Willie, whom she met while attending Nyack College. Together, they have a daughter. She lives in Waldorf, Maryland.
