= Chuck Murphy (politician) =

American politician

Member-elect of the Maryland House of Delegates from the 42A district
- Assuming office January 13, 2027
- Succeeding: Alex Harlan

Personal details
- Born: Charles Edward Murphy III Baltimore County, Maryland, U.S.
- Party: Republican
- Spouse: Mollie Menzies

Charles Edward Murphy III is an American politician who is a member-elect of the Maryland House of Delegates from District 42A. He is a member of the Republican Party.

== Background ==
Murphy was born and raised in Baltimore County, Maryland. He attended Hampden–Sydney College. Prior to entering politics, Murphy worked as a senior credit risk analyst at Repsol Trading USA, an energy company based in The Woodlands, Texas.

== Maryland House of Delegates ==
In February 2026, Murphy filed to run for the Maryland House of Delegates in District 42A, seeking to succeed state delegate Nino Mangione, who ran for the Baltimore County Council and endorsed Murphy during the Republican primary. Mangione resigned from the Maryland House of Delegates in June 2026, after being appointed to the Baltimore County Council to serve the remainder of Wade Kach's term, creating an open seat. Murphy won the Republican primary on June 23, 2026, edging out his closest opponent by eight votes.

In September 2026, The Baltimore Sun reported that Murphy was registered to vote as a Republican in Harris County, Texas, and had only registered to vote in Maryland on the same day he filed to run for the Maryland House of Delegates in February 2026. Nicole Beus Harris, the chairwoman of the Maryland Republican Party, defended Murphy in a statement accusing Democrats of seeking to "talk about anything other than their own record of failure".

Murphy defeated Democratic nominee Jyoti Mohan in the general election on November 3, 2026. He will be sworn in on January 13, 2027, and will be a member of the Government, Labor, and Elections Committee.

== Political positions ==
During his 2026 House of Delegates campaign, Murphy supported lowering taxes, improving public safety, creating jobs, and defending constitutional rights. He opposed the Maryland Piedmont Reliability Project.

== Personal life ==
Murphy lives in Cockeysville, Maryland. He is married to his wife, Mollie Menzies.
