= Steve Patten =

American politician

Member-elect of the Maryland House of Delegates from the 42C district
- Assuming office January 13, 2027
- Succeeding: Joshua Stonko

Personal details
- Party: Republican

Steve Patten is an American politician and businessman who is a member-elect of the Maryland House of Delegates from District 42C. He is a member of the Republican Party.

== Background ==
Patten is the owner of the Maryland Beverage Journal trade publication.

== In the legislature ==
In March 2025, he filed to run for the Maryland House of Delegates in District 42C in 2026. His candidacy was endorsed by incumbent Joshua Stonko, state senator Chris West, and state delegate Chris Tomlinson. Patten ran unopposed in the Republican primary and defeated Democratic nominee Corynne Courpas in the general election on November 3, 2026. He was assigned to the Health Committee.

== Personal life ==
Patten lives in Hampstead, Maryland.
