= Chuck Cook (American politician) =

American politician

- Cook in 2026

Member-elect of the Maryland House of Delegates from the 33B district
- Assuming office January 13, 2027
- Succeeding: Stuart Schmidt Jr.

Personal details
- Born: Charles Cook; 1974 or 1975 (age 51–52)
- Party: Democratic
- Spouse: Jessica (m. 2000)
- Children: 3
- Education: Salisbury University (BS)

Charles Cook (born 1974 or 1975) is an American politician and U.S. Army veteran who is a member-elect of the Maryland House of Delegates from District 33B. He is a member of the Democratic Party.

== Early life and education ==
Cook was born in 1974 or 1975. He graduated from Salisbury University with a Bachelor of Science degree in computer science.

== Career ==
During the 2008 elections, Cook worked with the Wicomico County Democratic Club to register voters for the general election. He later served as the political director of the Maryland Democratic Party. He moved from Salisbury, Maryland, to Crofton in 2016.

Cook previously served as the political director of the Maryland State & DC AFL-CIO. From 2023 to 2026, he was a senior advisor to Maryland Department of Housing and Community Development secretary Jake Day.

== Maryland House of Delegates ==
Cook ran for the Maryland House of Delegates in District 33B in 2026, challenging Republican incumbent Stuart Schmidt Jr. He ran unopposed in the Democratic primary, during which he was endorsed by Governor Wes Moore, and defeated Schmidt in the general election. Cook will be sworn in on January 13, 2027, and will be a member of the Government, Labor, and Elections Committee.

== Personal life ==
Cook married Jessica Cook, an organizational specialist and lobbyist for the Maryland State Education Association, in 2000. Together, they have three children.
