= LaTasha Ward =

American politician (born 1967/1968)

Member-elect of the Maryland House of Delegates from the 24th district
- Assuming office January 13, 2027
- Succeeding: Tiffany T. Alston

Personal details
- Born: 1967 or 1968 (age 58–59)
- Party: Democratic
- Children: 1

LaTasha R. Ward (born 1967 or 1968) is an American politician and nonprofit executive who is a member-elect of the Maryland House of Delegates from the 24th district. She is a member of the Democratic Party.

== Early life and education ==
Ward was born in 1967 or 1968. She graduated from Saint Peter's University, where she earned a Bachelor of Arts degree in business management and marketing management.

== Career ==
Ward previously worked as the vice president of business development of QED Inc., an economic development consulting firm. She owns two nonprofit organizations called "Go Promote U" and "The Solid Foundation".

Ward was previously a member of the Prince George's County Democratic Central Committee. During the 2020 elections, she managed the campaign of Gladys Weatherspoon, a candidate for the Prince George's County circuit court.

== Maryland House of Delegates ==
Ward unsuccessfully ran for the Maryland House of Delegates in District 24 in 2018 and 2022, placing fourth in the Democratic primary each time. In October 2021, after state delegate Erek Barron resigned to serve as the U.S. Attorney for the District of Maryland, Ward applied to serve the remainder of Barron's term; the Prince George's County Democratic Central Committee appointed Faye Martin Howell by a 16–2 vote later that month. In December 2025, after state delegate Jazz Lewis resigned that he would resign from the Maryland House of Delegates, Ward applied to serve the remainder of Lewis's term. The Prince George's County Democratic Central Committee appointed Derrick Coley to the seat in January 2026, after which Ward announced that she would again run for the Maryland House of Delegates in 2026. She won the Democratic primary election on June 23, 2026, and ran in the general election unopposed. Ward will be sworn in on January 13, 2027, and will be a member of the Government, Labor, and Elections Committee.

== Political positions ==
In March 2025, Ward organized boycotts against the Target Corporation after the company decided to cut its diversity, equity, and inclusion programs.

== Personal life ==
Ward has a daughter.
