= Ryan Turner (politician) =

American politician (born 1987/1988)

Member-elect of the Maryland House of Delegates from the 41st district
- Assuming office January 13, 2027
- Succeeding: Malcolm Ruff

Personal details
- Born: 1987 or 1988 (age 38–39) Baltimore, Maryland, U.S.
- Party: Democratic
- Education: Coppin State University (BA)

Ryan A. Turner (born 1987 or 1988) is an American politician and nonprofit executive who is a member-elect of the Maryland House of Delegates from the 41st district. He is a member of the Democratic Party.

== Early life and education ==
Turner was born in west Baltimore in 1987 or 1988. He graduated from Coppin State University in 2018, earning a Bachelor of Arts degree in applied psychology. He is a member of the Beta Kappa Chi, Psi Chi, and Alpha Phi Alpha fraternities, previously serving as the president of Coppin's Delta Lambda chapter.

== Career ==
In 2011, Turner founded Akoben Foundation, a nonprofit organization that helps Baltimore students achieve reading proficiency at or above grade level by the end of third grade. After graduating from Coppin, he started work at the Community Law in Action nonprofit organization, eventually becoming its first African American executive director. In July 2021, the GreenLight Fund named Turner as the founding executive director of its Baltimore operations.

Turner also volunteers as a trustee for a charter school in west Baltimore.

== Maryland House of Delegates ==
Turner ran to represent the 41st district of the Maryland House of Delegates in 2026, seeking to succeed Malcolm Ruff, who ran for Maryland Senate. His candidacy was endorsed by Governor Wes Moore. Turner won the Democratic primary on June 23, 2026, placing third behind incumbents Samuel I. Rosenberg and Sean Stinnett with 14.3% of the vote. Turner, Stinnett, and Rosenberg ran unopposed in the general election. He will be sworn in on January 13, 2027, and will be a member of the Ways and Means Committee.
