= Mike Jacobs (Maryland politician) =

American politician

Member-elect of the Maryland House of Delegates from the 31st district
- Assuming office January 13, 2027
- Succeeding: Nic Kipke

Personal details
- Born: 1965 or 1966 (age 60–61) Anne Arundel County, Maryland, U.S.
- Party: Republican
- Children: 6

Mike Jacobs (born 1965 or 1966) is an American politician and business owner who is a member-elect of the Maryland House of Delegates from the 31st district. He is a member of the Republican Party.

== Early life and career ==
Jacobs was born and raised in Anne Arundel County, Maryland. He manages his family's machine shop and boat lift business, and is the director of the Lake Shore Athletic Association's softball club in Pasadena, Maryland.

Jacobs unsuccessfully ran to represent the 31st district in the Maryland Senate in 2006, placing third in the Republican primary with 21.2% of the vote.

== Maryland House of Delegates ==
In 2026, Jacobs ran for the Maryland House of Delegates in District 31. He ran alongside incumbents LaToya Nkongolo and Brian Chisholm in the primary election and won the general election on November 3, 2026, placing second with 17.5% of the vote. Jacobs was assigned to the Judiciary Committee.

== Personal life ==
Jacobs has six children and lives in Pasadena, Maryland. He is a two-time cancer survivor.

== Electoral history ==
2006 Maryland Senate District 31 Republican primary election
| Party | Candidate | Votes | % |
|---|---|---|---|
| Republican | Bryan Simonaire | 3,032 | 42.0 |
| Republican | Carl G. "Dutch" Holland | 1,620 | 22.4 |
| Republican | Mike Jacobs | 1,533 | 21.2 |
| Republican | Thomas R. Gardner | 821 | 11.4 |
| Republican | Charles "Casey" Robison | 218 | 3.0 |
