= Christa Tichy =

American politician (born 1963)

Member-elect of the Maryland House of Delegates from the 19th district
- Assuming office January 13, 2027
- Succeeding: Bonnie Cullison

Personal details
- Born: July 13, 1963 (age 63)
- Party: Democratic
- Spouse: Jodie Bekman (m. 2026)
- Children: 2
- Education: University of Maryland, College Park

Christa Tichy (born July 13, 1963) is an American politician and electrician who is a member-elect of the Maryland House of Delegates from the 19th district. She is a member of the Democratic Party.

== Early life and education ==
Tichy was born on July 13, 1963. She was raised in The Bronx in New York City. Tichy graduated from the Academy of Mount St. Ursula and earned a bachelor's degree from the University of Maryland, College Park in 2024.

== Career ==
Tichy enrolled in a program at Montgomery College to learn how to become an electrician. She previously taught in Montgomery County Public Schools and now teaches at Montgomery College. Tichy also runs her own business called C&T Contracting and is a member of International Brotherhood of Electrical Workers Local 26.

Tichy was a member of the Montgomery County Democratic Central Committee, becoming its assistant secretary in December 2024. In April 2021, Tichy filed to run for the Montgomery County Council in the 6th district in 2022. placing fifth in the Democratic primary with 4.51% of the vote.

== Maryland House of Delegates ==
In August 2025, Tichy announced that she would run for an at-large seat on the Montgomery County Council. After state delegate Bonnie Cullison announced that she would not run for re-election in January 2026, Tichy opted to instead run for the Maryland House of Delegates in District 19, seeking to succeed Cullison. She won the Democratic primary on June 23, 2026, placing third behind incumbents Vaughn Stewart and Charlotte Crutchfield, and ran unopposed in the general election. She will be sworn in on January 13, 2027, and will be a member of the Judiciary Committee.

== Political positions ==
During her 2022 county council campaign, Tichy supported creating a county composting system, establishing a paper mill, and starting programs to support beekeeping. She also supported expanding trade schools in the county and doubling the number of rental assistance vouchers offered to low-income residents by the county. During her 2026 state delegate campaign, she supported strengthening labor unions and education programs, including vocational education and apprenticeship programs, as well as expanding affordable housing and supporting small business owners.

== Personal life ==
Tichy lives in Rockville, Maryland. She is queer, and married her wife, Jodie Bekman, during her 2026 House of Delegates campaign. She has two children.
