= Tracy Gant =

American politician (born 1963 or 1964)

- Gant in 2017

Member-elect of the Maryland House of Delegates from the 22nd district
- Assuming office January 13, 2027
- Succeeding: Nicole A. Williams

Personal details
- Born: 1963 or 1964 (age 62–63)
- Party: Democratic
- Children: 1

Tracy R. Gant (born 1963 or 1964) is an American politician who is a member-elect of the Maryland House of Delegates from the 22nd district. A member of the Democratic Party, she served as the mayor of Edmonston from 2014 to 2026.

== Early life and education ==
Gant was born in 1963 or 1964. She graduated from University City High School and attended the University of Maryland, College Park.

== Career ==
Gant was elected to the Edmonston Town Council in 1992 and elected in 1994 until 2014. Gant was elected mayor of Edmonston in 2014, becoming the town's first African American and second female mayor, and was subsequently re-elected in 2017, 2020, and 2023. From 2016 to 2017, she served as the president of the Maryland Municipal League.

== Maryland House of Delegates ==
In 2026, Gant ran for the Maryland House of Delegates in District 22. She won the Democratic primary election on June 23, 2026, and ran unopposed in the general election. Gant will be sworn in on January 13, 2027, and will be a member of the Government, Labor, and Elections Committee.

== Political positions ==
In November 2024, Gant voted to give noncitizens the right to vote in the town's elections and to restore voting rights to individuals who were previously incarcerated.

== Personal life ==
Gant is married and has one child.
