= Robin Harvey (politician) =

American politician (born 1970/1971)

- Harvey in 2026

Member-elect of the Maryland House of Delegates from the 10th district
- Assuming office January 13, 2027
- Succeeding: Adrienne A. Jones

Personal details
- Born: 1970 or 1971 (age 55–56)
- Party: Democratic
- Children: 4
- Education: College of William & Mary (BA); University of Pennsylvania (MSW)

Robin Harvey (born 1970 or 1971) is an American politician who is a member-elect of the Maryland House of Delegates from the 10th district. A member of the Democratic Party, she was previously a member of the Baltimore County Board of Education from 2022 to 2026.

== Early life and education ==
Harvey was born in 1970 or 1971. She graduated from the College of William & Mary with a Bachelor of Arts degree in psychology, and from the University of Pennsylvania, where she earned a Master of Social Work degree.

== Career ==
Harvey began her career as a guidance counselor in Boston Public Schools. Before joining the Baltimore County Board of Education, she worked on the campaign of state delegate Adrienne A. Jones and was the licensing and monitoring office director for the Maryland Department of Human Services.

In 2022, Harvey ran for the 1st district of the Baltimore County Board of Education. During her campaign, she was endorsed by Baltimore County executive Johnny Olszewski and the Teacher's Association of Baltimore County. She won election to the school board on November 8, 2022, defeating Cory Koons in the general election. During her tenure, Harvey served as the vice chair from 2022 to 2023 and from 2024 to 2026. She resigned from the Baltimore County Board of Education on March 10, 2026, and was succeeded by Peter Fitzpatrick, who was appointed to the school board by Governor Wes Moore in June 2026.

== Maryland House of Delegates ==
In February 2026, Harvey filed to run for the 10th district of the Maryland House of Delegates, seeking to succeed Adrienne A. Jones, who did not seek re-election. During her campaign, she ran on a platform that prioritized education, affordable housing, and investments in transportation and businesses within the district. Harvey won the Democratic primary on June 23, 2026, and ran unopposed in the general election. She will be a member of the Environment and Transportation Committee.

== Political positions ==
During her 2022 school board campaign, Harvey supported holding discussions on race, diversity, equity, and inclusion in classrooms, saying that they would enrich the education experience and that teachers can navigate the conversations responsibly. She also said that decisions on allowing pride flags in classrooms should be based on policy and supported teaching about sexual orientation and gender identity, but maintained that parents should be part of the process when students are learning about these topics and that the topics should be age-appropriate.

== Personal life ==
Harvey is married and has four children. She lives in Windsor Mill, Maryland.
