= Alex Harlan =

American politician (born 1997)

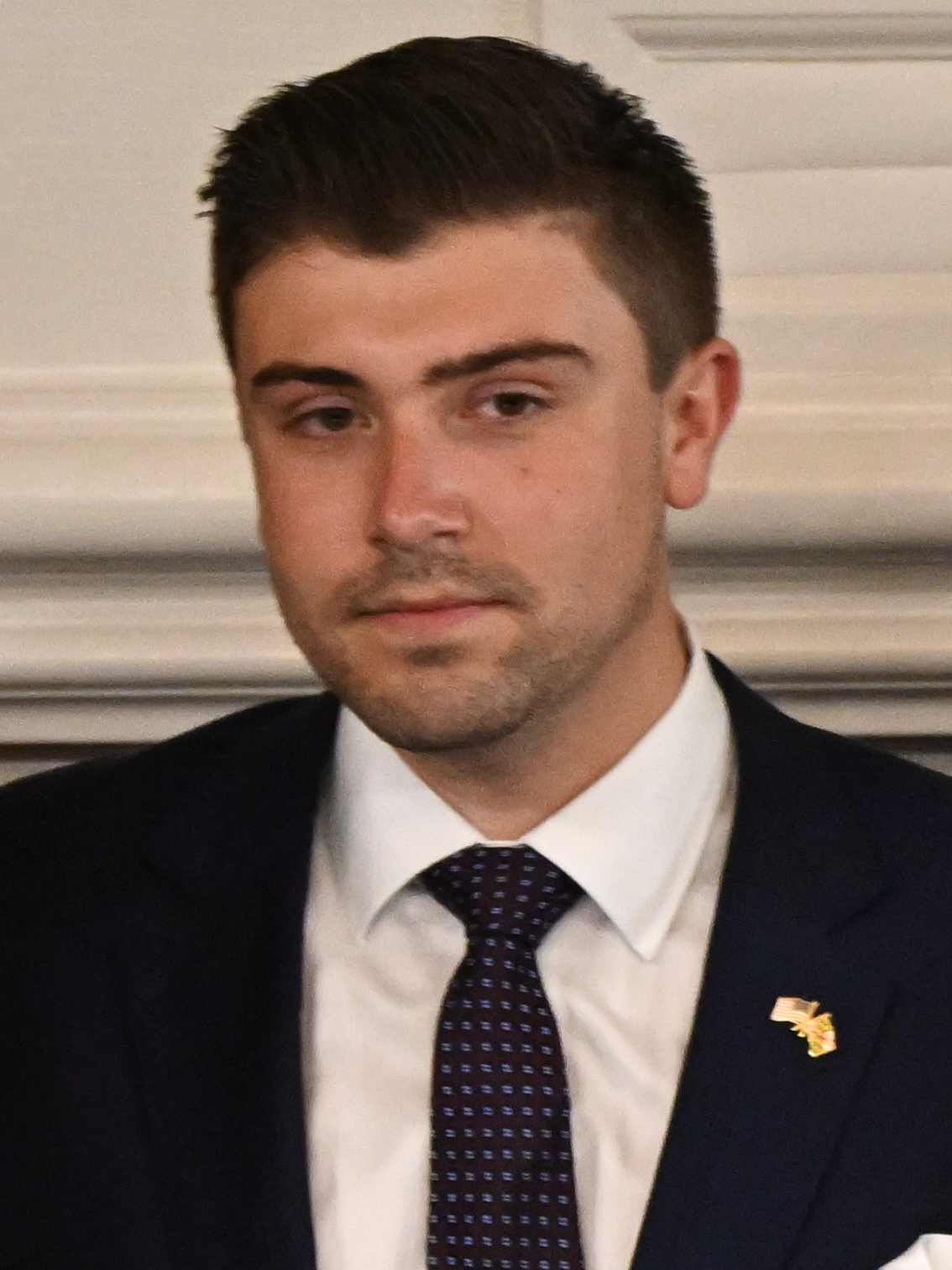
- Harlan in 2023

Member of the Maryland House of Delegates from the 42A district
- Incumbent
- Assumed office August 3, 2026
- Appointed by: Wes Moore
- Preceded by: Nino Mangione

Personal details
- Born: December 29, 1997 (age 28) Baltimore, Maryland, U.S.
- Party: Republican
- Education: Pennsylvania State University (BA); American University (MS)

Alexander M. Harlan (born December 29, 1997) is an American politician who has served as a member of the Maryland House of Delegates from District 42A since 2026. A member of the Republican Party, he succeeds Nino Mangione, who resigned from the Maryland House of Delegates after being appointed to the Baltimore County Council.

== Early life and education ==
Harlan was born in Baltimore on December 29, 1997. He graduated from Dulaney High School, afterwards attending Pennsylvania State University, where he earned a Bachelor of Arts degree in political science in 2020, and American University, earning a Master of Science in counter-terrorism and homeland security in 2022.

== Career ==
Harlan has served in the Jacksonville Volunteer Fire Department since his junior year of high school. He was an intern in the Defense and Foreign Policy department of the Cato Institute, afterwards becoming a research associate at the Orion Policy Institute. At the same time, he also served as an assistant chief of staff to Maryland state senator Chris West.

In 2026, he ran for the Maryland House of Delegates in District 42A, seeking to succeed state delegate Nino Mangione, who retired to run for the Baltimore County Council. Harlan was defeated in the Republican primary election. In June 2026, after Mangione resigned from the House of Delegates, Harlan applied to serve the remainder of Mangione's term. He was nominated to the seat by the Baltimore County Republican Central Committee later that month, and appointed to the House of Delegates by Governor Wes Moore. He was sworn in on August 3, 2026.
