= Dan Duggan =

American politician

Member-elect of the Maryland House of Delegates from the 1A district
- Assuming office January 13, 2027
- Succeeding: Jim Hinebaugh

Personal details
- Party: Republican
- Education: Garrett College (AA)

Military service
- Branch: United States Marine Corps
- Service years: 1982–2003
- Rank: Gunnery sergeant

Daniel P. Duggan is an American politician who is a member-elect of the Maryland House of Delegates from District 1A. A member of the Republican Party, he previously served as the chief judge of the Garrett County Orphans' Court from 2015 to 2022.

== Early life and education ==
Duggan graduated from Mt. Lebanon High School in Mt. Lebanon, Pennsylvania. He served in the U.S. Marine Corps from 1982 to 1986, afterwards serving in the U.S. Marine Corps Reserve until 2003, retiring as a gunnery sergeant. In 2009, he graduated from Garrett College with an associate degree.

== Career ==
Duggan worked as a patrol deputy for the Garrett County Sheriff's Office from 2000 to 2025, retiring at the rank of lieutenant. He also owns his own real estate appraisal company, Mountaintop Appraisal Service Inc., and is a realtor.

Duggan was elected as a judge of the Garrett County Orphans' Court in 2014, placing third in the general election after running a write-in campaign. In April 2015, Governor Larry Hogan named Duggan as the chief judge of the Orphans' Court. He was re-elected in 2018.

== Maryland House of Delegates ==
In February 2026, Duggan announced that he would run for the Maryland House of Delegates in District 1A, seeking to succeed Jim Hinebaugh, who retired. He won the Republican primary on June 23, 2026, and defeated Democratic nominee Jason Jobe in the general election. Duggan was assigned to the Appropriations Committee.

== Electoral history ==
2014 Garrett County Judge of the Orphans' Court election
Party	Candidate	Votes	%
Republican	Fred Sanders	5,963	41.1%
Republican	Wayne Wilt (incumbent)	5,665	39.1%
Republican	Dan Duggan (write-in)	1,929	13.3%
Republican	Dave Beard (write-in)	585	4.0%
Democratic	Everett B. DeBerry (write-in)	252	1.7%
Write-in		103	0.7%
Total votes		14,497	100.00%

2018 Garrett Judge of the County Orphans' Court election
Primary election
Party	Candidate	Votes	%
Republican	Dan Duggan (incumbent)	1,897	29.4%
Republican	Jack Rush Turney	1,619	25.1%
Republican	Fred Sanders (incumbent)	1,521	23.6%
Republican	David C. Beard	1,406	21.8%
Total votes		6,443	100.00%
General election
Republican	Dan Duggan (incumbent)	7,616	37.3%
Republican	Jack Rush Turney	6,427	31.5%
Republican	Fred Sanders (incumbent)	6,290	30.8%
Write-in		93	0.5%
Total votes		20,426	100.00%
