= C. L. Marshall =

American politician (born 1963)

Member-elect of the Maryland House of Delegates from the 38A district
- Assuming office January 13, 2027
- Succeeding: Kevin Anderson

Personal details
- Born: Carroll Lee Marshall III; 1963 (age 62–63) Virginia, U.S.
- Party: Republican
- Education: Elon University (BA)

Carroll Lee Marshall III (born 1963) is an American politician and fishing captain who is a member-elect of the Maryland House of Delegates from District 38A. A member of the Republican Party, he previously served on the Pocomoke City council from 2024 to 2026.

== Early life and education ==
Marshall was born and raised on the Eastern Shore of Virginia. He moved to Pocomoke City, Maryland, in 1987. He graduated from Broadwater Academy in Exmore, Virginia, and earned a Bachelor of Arts degree in business form Elon University in 1985.

== Career ==
Marshall previously worked in sales for the Holt Paper & Chemical Company. He was also an editor for the Shore Golf tabloid and Fisherman Magazine. Marshall is the owner of Tangier Sound Charters, a charter fishing company, is a licensed fishing guide, and has written several books about the Chesapeake Bay.

Marshall was the chair of the Pocomoke City Board of Zoning Appeals before he was elected to represent the 5th district of the Pocomoke City Council in April 2024, defeating incumbent C. Esther Troast. During the city council election, he ran on a platform that included increased government transparency and encouraging responsible development.

== Maryland House of Delegates ==
In November 2025, following the death of state delegate Charles J. Otto, Marshall applied to serve the remainder of Otto's term in the Maryland House of Delegates. The Republican Central Committees of Somerset County, Worcester County, and Wicomico County voted to nominate seed farmer Kevin Anderson to the seat later that month. Marshall filed to run for the Maryland House of Delegates in District 38A in February 2026, seeking to succeed Anderson, who did not seek election to a full four-year term. Marshall won the Republican primary on June 23, 2026, with 57.8% of the vote, and defeated Democratic nominee Shelley Johnson in the general election. Marshall was assigned to the Appropriations Committee.

== Political positions ==
During his 2026 House of Delegates campaign, Marshall opposed a proposed offshore wind power project off the coast of Ocean City, Maryland. He also criticized state and federal oversight of the farming industry and state efforts to encourage affordable housing development.

== Bibliography ==
- Chesapeake Bay Duck Hunting Tales, The History Press, 2016. ISBN 9781439658390
- Hunting & Fishing the Chesapeake: Unforgettable Tales of Wing and Water, The History Press, 2017. ISBN 9781439663639
- Chesapeake Outdoor Tales: Hunting and Fishing by the Tides, The History Press, 2019. ISBN 9781439668160
- Chesapeake Bay Adventures: Tales from the Eastern Shore, The History Press, 2023. ISBN 9781439677438
