= Spencer Dixon =

American politician (born 1991)

- Dixon in 2024

Member-elect of the Maryland House of Delegates from the 32nd district
- Assuming office January 13, 2027
- Succeeding: Mark S. Chang

Personal details
- Born: 1991 (age 34–35)
- Party: Democratic
- Education: George Washington University (BA, MPP)

Spencer F. Dixon (born 1991) is an American politician who is a member-elect of the Maryland House of Delegates from the 32nd district. He is a member of the Democratic Party.

== Early life and education ==
Dixon was born in 1991. He earned Bachelor of Arts and Master of Public Policy degrees from George Washington University.

== Career ==
Dixon worked as the legislative director for state senator Dawn Gile from 2023 to 2025, afterwards working as the strategic operations manager for the Maryland Prescription Drug Affordability Board. He also served as the chair of the Anne Arundel County Public Campaign Financing System Commission.

In February 2026, minutes before the candidate filing deadline, Dixon filed to run for the Maryland House of Delegates in District 32, seeking to succeed Mark S. Chang. Chang asked Dixon to run for the seat after Chang decided to run for the Maryland Senate in District 32, seeking to succeed Pamela Beidle, who withdrew her re-election campaign on the same day. During the Democratic primary, Dixon ran on a slate with Beidle, Chang, and state delegate J. Sandy Bartlett. Dixon won the Democratic primary on June 23, 2026, placing third with 25.2% of the vote, and defeated Republicans Mary Phelps, Colin McEvers, and Marcus Snipes in the general election.

Dixon will be sworn in on January 13, 2027. He will be a member of the Economic Matters Committee.

== Personal life ==
Dixon is openly gay.
