= Charles J. Otto =

American politician (1964–2025)

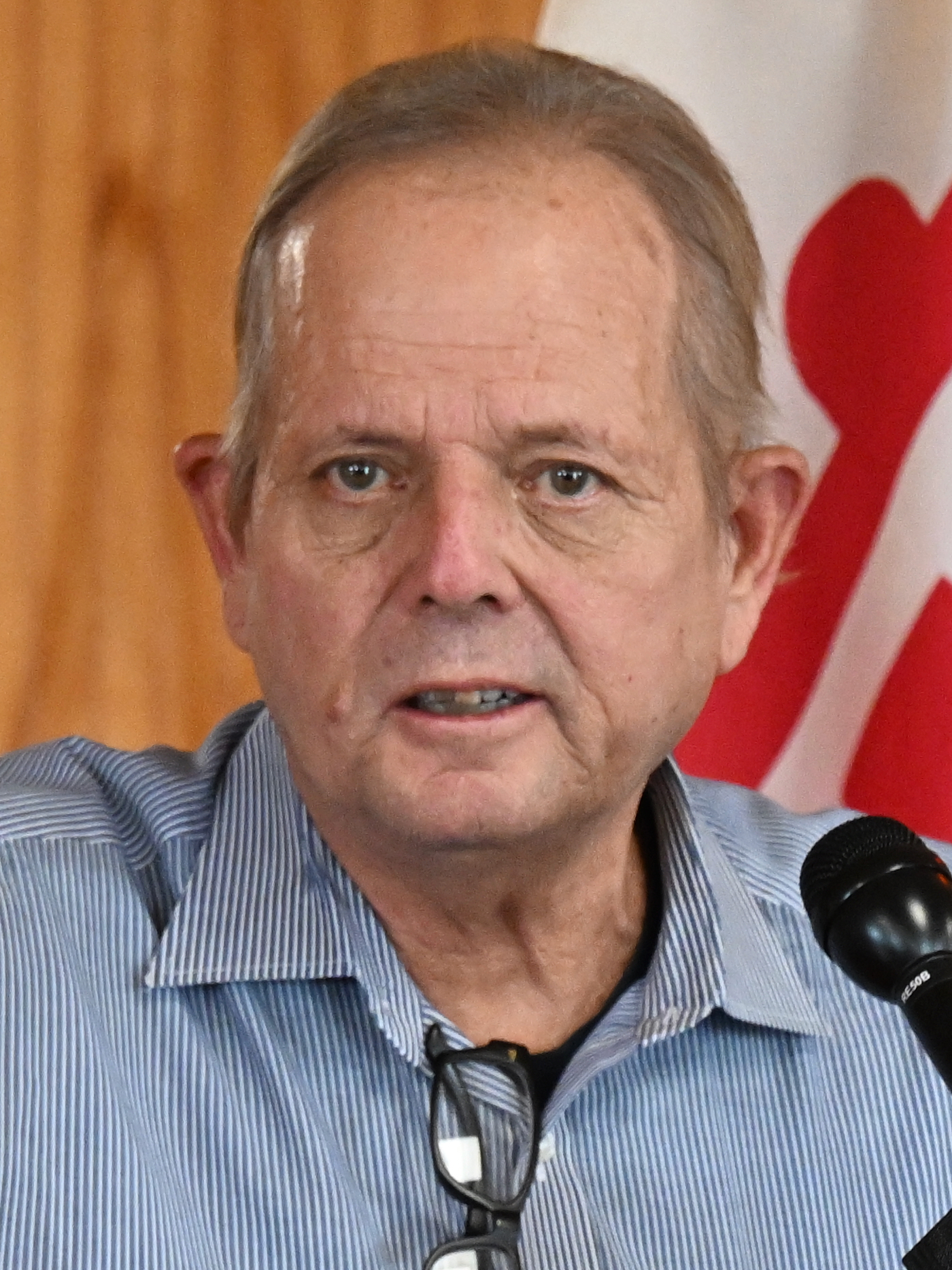
- Otto in 2025

Member of the Maryland House of Delegates from the 38A district
- In office January 12, 2011 – October 17, 2025
- Preceded by: Carolyn J. Elmore
- Succeeded by: Kevin Anderson

Personal details
- Born: February 15, 1964 Salisbury, Maryland, U.S.
- Died: October 17, 2025 (aged 61) Princess Anne, Maryland, U.S.
- Party: Republican

Charles James Otto (February 15, 1964 – October 17, 2025) was an American politician and farmer who was a Republican member of the Maryland House of Delegates representing district 38A from 2011 until his death on October 17, 2025.

== Early life and career ==
Otto was born on February 15, 1964, in Salisbury, Maryland. He graduated from Washington High School and attended the University of Maryland Eastern Shore and Virginia Polytechnic Institute and State University, earning a Bachelor of Science degree in animal science in 1986. Otto was selected to be an alternative student page during the 1982 session of the Maryland General Assembly.

Otto was a corn and soybean farmer at his family's farm in Princess Anne, Maryland. He previously worked as a sales representative and crop consultant for various organizations, including the William B. Tilghman Co. and the Maryland Farm Bureau, as well as having roles in various agricultural organizations in the community.

== Maryland House of Delegates ==
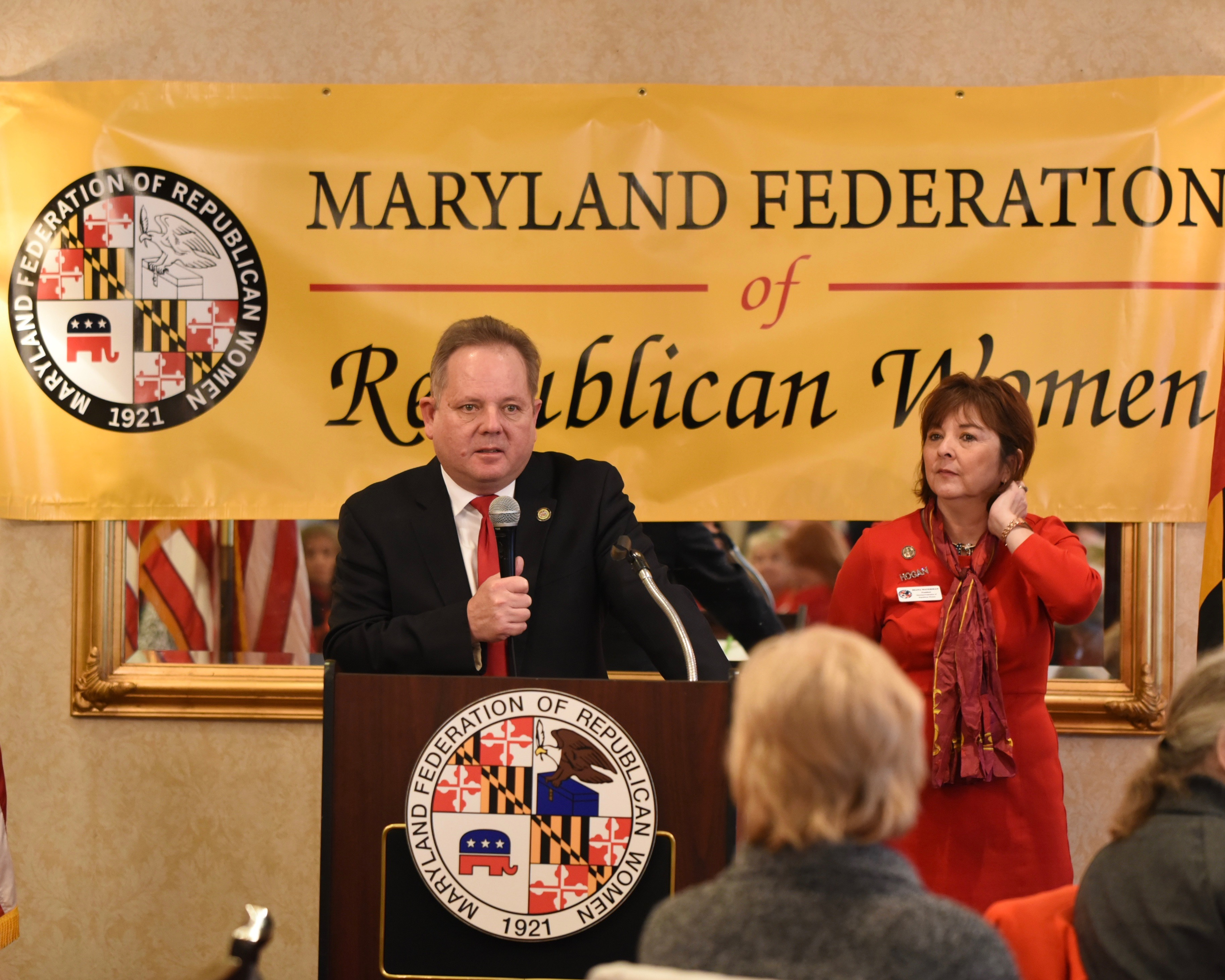
Otto speaks at a Maryland Federation of Republican Women event, 2019

Otto was elected to the House of Delegates in 2010, succeeding Carolyn J. Elmore, who was appointed to the seat following the death of her husband Page. He was sworn in on January 12, 2011. In the legislature, Otto was known for keeping a low profile, his knowledge on agricultural issues, and advocacy for Maryland's rural communities and its watermen. He served on the Environment and Transportation Committee during his entire tenure, as well as working as the deputy minority whip for the Maryland House Republican Caucus from 2013 until his death in October 2025.

== Political positions ==
=== Agriculture ===
In 2012, Otto said he opposed a bill that would ban arsenic in chicken feed, claiming that arsenic was not "an environmental threat or a human health threat". The United States Environmental Protection Agency states that all forms of arsenic are a serious risk to human health.

In 2014, Otto supported legislation to allow the use of hydraulic dredges to catch clams south of the Verrazano Bridge.

During the 2023 legislative session, Otto introduced legislation to allow hunting on Sundays in Worcester County. The bill passed and became law.

=== Crime ===
In March 2013, Otto voted against a bill to repeal the death penalty.

Following a string of false bomb threats made against schools and other public facilities across Delmarva in early 2016, Otto introduced legislation that would increase penalties for people who make fake bomb threats. The bill passed and was signed into law.

=== Education ===
Otto supported Maryland's Broadening Options and Opportunities for Students Today (BOOST) program, which provides state-funded scholarships to low-income students attending private schools. He also supported the expansion of charter schools.

During the 2018 legislative session, Otto introduced legislation that would allow residents of Somerset County to qualify for free tuition at Wor–Wic Community College.

=== Environment ===
Otto opposed proposals to build a wind farm off the coast of Ocean City, Maryland, supporting legislation in 2018 that would have required turbines to be built 26 miles offshore. The bill received an unfavorable report in the Environment and Transportation Committee.

In 2014, Otto introduced bills to repeal Maryland's "Rain Tax".

During the 2016 legislative session, Otto signed onto a letter calling on the federal government to ban seismic airgun blasting. In January 2017, the Bureau of Ocean Energy Management said it would deny a proposal to allow seismic airgun blasting off the coast of Ocean City.

In 2019, Otto supported legislation to hold Exelon fiscally responsible for costs associated with Conowingo Dam cleanup projects and implementing the dam's watershed implementation plan.

=== Fiscal issues ===
During the 2011 legislative session, Otto voted against legislation to increase fees on license plates and official documents to pay for road repair projects. In March 2013, he voted against legislation to index the state's fuel taxes to inflation.

During the 2014 legislative session, Otto voted against a bill to raise the state's minimum wage to $10.10 an hour.

=== Gun policy ===
During the 2013 legislative session, Otto voted against the Firearm Safety Act, a bill that placed restrictions on firearm purchases and magazine capacity in semi-automatic rifles. In May 2023, he signed onto a letter calling on Governor Wes Moore to veto the Gun Safety Act, an omnibus gun control bill that increased requirements and fees to obtain a handgun permit, strengthened safe storage requirements, and prohibited carrying guns near certain locations.

=== Marijuana ===
Otto supported the legalization of medical marijuana in Maryland, but expressed concerns with the legalization of recreational marijuana.

=== Social issues ===
During the 2012 legislative session, Otto voted against the Civil Marriage Protection Act, which legalized same-sex marriage in Maryland.

In 2019, Otto introduced legislation requiring Somerset County commissioners to live in the districts they represent. The bill passed unanimously and became law.

== Personal life and death ==
Otto was a member of and treasurer for the John Wesley United Methodist Church in Princess Anne, Maryland. He died at his home in Princess Anne on October 17, 2025, at the age of 61.

During the 2026 legislative session, the Maryland House of Delegates renamed House Bill 972, which establishes the Maryland Fair and Agricultural Education Promise Fund to promote statewide agricultural education and career development, to the "Charles J. Otto Agricultural Education Promise Act". The bill passed and was signed into law by Governor Wes Moore in April 2026.

== Electoral history ==
Maryland House of Delegates District 38A Republican primary election, 2010
Party	Candidate	Votes	%
Republican	Charles James Otto	1,558	40.4
Republican	John K. Phoebus	1,185	30.7
Republican	John T. Cannon	732	19.0
Republican	Julie D. Brewington	384	10.0

Maryland House of Delegates District 38A election, 2010
Party	Candidate	Votes	%
Republican	Charles James Otto	8,714	62.1
Democratic	Michael K. McCready	5,293	37.7
Write-in		19	0.1

Maryland House of Delegates District 38A election, 2014
Party	Candidate	Votes	%
Republican	Charles James Otto (incumbent)	7,431	60.5
Democratic	Percy J. Purnell, Jr.	4,838	39.4
Write-in		10	0.1

Maryland House of Delegates District 38A election, 2018
Party	Candidate	Votes	%
Republican	Charles James Otto (incumbent)	8,707	59.4
Democratic	Kirkland J. Hall, Sr.	5,939	40.5
Write-in		20	0.1

Maryland House of Delegates District 38A election, 2022
Party	Candidate	Votes	%
Republican	Charles James Otto (incumbent)	10,023	63.2
Democratic	Todd J. Nock	5,828	36.7
Write-in		15	0.1
