= J. Lowell Stoltzfus =

American politician

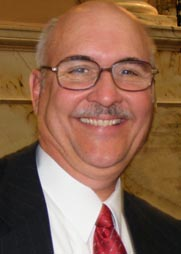
- Stoltzfus in 2008

Minority Leader of the Maryland Senate
- In office September 27, 2001 – December 18, 2006
- Preceded by: Martin G. Madden
- Succeeded by: David R. Brinkley

Minority Whip of the Maryland Senate
- In office November 19, 1998 – September 27, 2001
- Preceded by: John W. Derr
- Succeeded by: Larry E. Haines

Member of the Maryland Senate from the 38th district
- In office January 7, 1992 – January 12, 2011
- Preceded by: Lewis R. Riley
- Succeeded by: James N. Mathias Jr.

Member of the Maryland House of Delegates from the 38th district
- In office January 9, 1991 – January 7, 1992 Serving with Norman Conway, Bennett Bozman
- Preceded by: Charles A. Bruce Jr. Shirley W. Pilchard
- Succeeded by: Charles A. McClenahan

Personal details
- Born: July 15, 1949 (age 77) Pottstown, Pennsylvania
- Party: Republican
- Spouse: Sharon
- Children: 4
- Education: Salisbury State College (BA)

James Lowell Stoltzfus (born July 15, 1949) is a former Republican state senator, having represented Maryland's 38th Legislative District. He was also a member of the Maryland House of Delegates for District 38.

== Early life and education ==
James Lowell Stoltzfus was born in Pottstown, Pennsylvania, the second of six children. His parents were both Mennonite, and his grandfather was born to an Amish family. At five years old, he moved to Snow Hill, where his father was starting a Mennonite church. He attended a Mennonite boarding school in Pennsylvania, then attended Salisbury University. He majored in English and Sociology, and was a played center on the basketball team. He then completed a year of seminary at Eastern Mennonite University.

After graduation, Stoltzfus began teaching English and music at Pocomoke High School in Pocomoke City. Following this, he took over his father's plant nursery and expanded the family farm.

== Career ==
Stoltzfus has been a member of the Maryland Senate since January 1992. He became Minority Leader in the Maryland Senate in 2001. He was previously appointed as Minority Whip in 1998.

In 1998 Stoltzfus co-sponsored a bill that would have allowed Eastern Shore of Maryland residents to vote in a straw poll on secession from Maryland. He has been an outspoken critic of the University of Maryland, College Park's inability to control the illegal, often violent and destructive actions of the student body.

On August 6, 2009, Senator Stoltzfus announced that he would not seek reelection in 2010 so that he may spend more time with his wife and work at his nursery.

== Political views ==
Stoltzfus is anti-abortion and a fiscal conservative. He "rarely breaks from his party".

== Personal life ==
Stoltlzfus is a Mennonite, and teaches weekly Sunday school classes to adults. While serving in the Maryland State Senate, he was one of two members that worked as farmers, owning over 500 acres of farmland.

His wife Sharon is also Mennonite, and they first met in high school. They have four children.
