= Kevin Anderson (American politician) =

American politician (born 1967)

Member of the Maryland House of Delegates from the 38A district
- Incumbent
- Assumed office December 9, 2025
- Appointed by: Wes Moore
- Preceded by: Charles J. Otto

Personal details
- Born: Howard Kevin Anderson; 1967 (age 58–59)
- Party: Republican
- Spouse: Elizabeth Lorraine Skelton
- Children: 2
- Education: University of Maryland, College Park (AA)
- Occupation: Farmer; politician

Howard Kevin Anderson (born 1967) is an American farmer and politician who is a Republican member of the Maryland House of Delegates, representing District 38A since 2025.

== Background ==
Howard Kevin Anderson was born in 1967 to William Anderson, a Somerset County farmer and president of the Somerset County Board of Education. At the age of 14, Anderson was withdrawn from Washington High School to attend McDonogh School near Baltimore.

Anderson is a third-generation seed farmer and has been farming since the late 1980s. He and his father, William, operate Wimberly Farms, which specializes in growing corn, soybeans, wheat, and barley, near Princess Anne, Maryland. Anderson got into farming and seed cleaning after graduating from the University of Maryland, College Park, where he earned an associate degree in agriculture production and management. In 1991, he launched a seed cleaning operation at Wimberly Farms.

In 1995, Anderson was elected as director of the Somerset County Farm Bureau. He also served on the boards of UniSouth Genetics, the Maryland Grain Producers Association, the Maryland Crop Improvement Association, and the Somerset County Property Review Board. He received a governor's citation for his work on the Pocomoke floodplain with The Nature Conservancy. In 2002, Anderson was given the National Young Farmer Achievement Award by the American Farm Bureau Federation. In February 2004, the Andersons were inducted into the Governor's Agriculture Hall of Fame. In 2007, Anderson and his wife were one of four winners of the 51st National Outstanding Young Farmers Awards Congress.

Anderson first became involved in politics in the summer of 2010, when he encouraged his friend Charles J. Otto to run for the Maryland House of Delegates in District 38A following the death of incumbent state delegate D. Page Elmore. After driving Otto to Baltimore to file the paperwork to run, Anderson served as Otto's campaign manager.

== In the legislature ==
In October 2025, following the death of state delegate Charles J. Otto, Anderson applied to serve the remainder of Otto's term in the Maryland House of Delegates. The Wicomico, Somerset, and Worcester County Republican Central Committees unanimously voted on November 10, 2025, to nominate Anderson to the seat. Anderson was appointed to the House of Delegates on November 25, 2025, and sworn in on December 9, 2025. He did not run for election to keep his seat in 2026.

== Political positions ==
In 2014, Anderson opposed proposed phosphorus management tools that would limit how much chicken manure farmers could use as fertilizer on Maryland's lower Eastern Shore, saying that the rules would increase the cost of growing an acre of corn by 30 percent and would personally cost him $187,000 a year. In May 2018, he told WBOC-TV that he was not concerned by retaliatory soybean tariffs imposed on the United States during the China–United States trade war, saying that farmers could "sit on the sidelines and let it play out a little bit" to come up with a strategy for dealing with the tariffs. During the 2022 legislative session, Anderson testified for a bill that would give Maryland farmers the right to repair agricultural equipment.

== Personal life ==
In January 1997, Anderson was charged with three felony counts of first-degree assault, two counts of reckless endangerment, and reckless driving after reportedly shooting a shotgun and chasing three college students eight miles in his pickup truck.

Anderson married Elizabeth Lorraine Skelton. Together, they have two daughters and live at another family farm in Princess Anne, Maryland. He was close friends with his predecessor, Charles J. Otto, with Otto having been the best man at Anderson's wedding.
