= Carolyn J. Elmore =

American politician (born 1943)

Member of the Maryland House of Delegates from the 38A district
- In office July 19, 2010 – January 12, 2011
- Appointed by: Martin O'Malley
- Preceded by: D. Page Elmore
- Succeeded by: Charles J. Otto

Personal details
- Born: April 24, 1943 (age 83) Chester, Pennsylvania, U.S.
- Party: Republican
- Spouse: D. Page Elmore (d. 2010)
- Profession: Politician

Carolyn J. Elmore (born April 24, 1943, in Chester, Pennsylvania) is an American politician. She is a Republican and a former member of the Maryland House of Delegates representing district 38A, serving from July 19, 2010, to January 12, 2011. Following the death of her husband, D. Page Elmore, Governor Martin O'Malley appointed her to serve the remainder of his term in the House of Delegates. She stated before the elections that she would not file to run for re-election, and that it was her husband's wish that she fill the seat in the interim between his death and the 2011 legislative session.

Before serving in the House of Delegates, she was an educator for the Wicomico County School System.
