= Somerset County Public Schools =

School district in Maryland, United States

- 7982A Tawes Campus Dr. Westover, Maryland

District information
- Motto: Success, Nothing Less
- Superintendent: W. David Bromwell
- Schools: 7 (8 including Technology and Career Center)

Students and staff
- Students: 2,849

Other information
- Website: somerset.k12.md.us

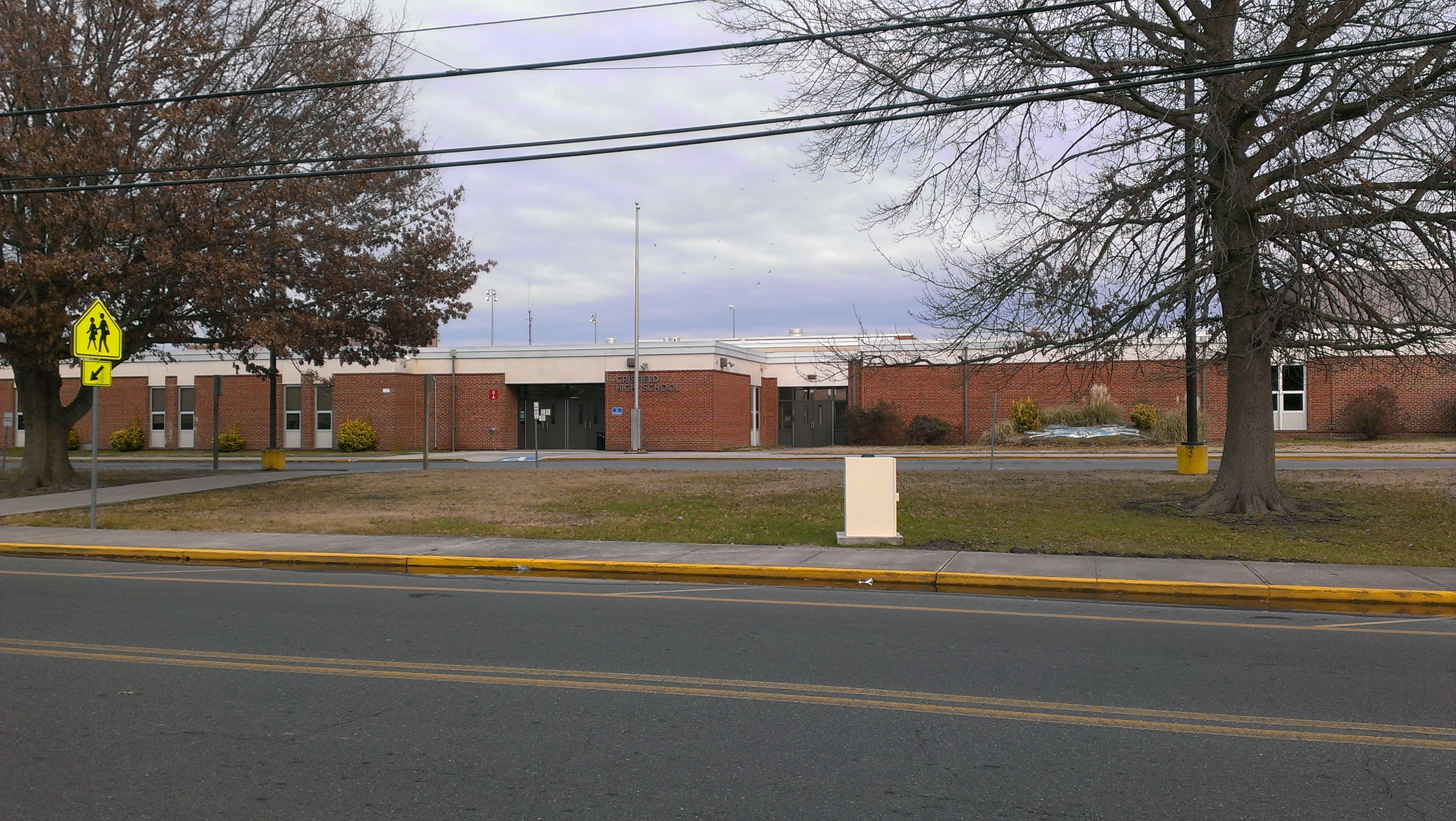
A view of Crisfield High School.

Somerset County Public Schools is a U.S. public school system serving the residents of Somerset County, Maryland.

== History ==
The Somerset County schools became desegregated in 1969 after the federal government began to withheld education funds. The first African American School Superintendent was H. DeWayne Whittington, who was appointed in 1988.

== High schools ==
- Crisfield, Crisfield, Maryland
- Washington, Princess Anne, Maryland

== Middle schools ==
- Somerset Intermediate, Westover, Maryland

== Elementary schools ==
- Carter G. Woodson, Crisfield, Maryland
- Deal Island, Deal Island, Maryland
- Ewell, Ewell, Maryland
- Greenwood, Princess Anne, Maryland
- Princess Anne, Princess Anne, Maryland

== Other schools ==
- Somerset County Technical High School, Westover
