= Josh Hastings =

American politician (born 1982)

- Hastings in 2023

Member-elect of the Maryland House of Delegates from the 38B district
- Elect
- Assuming office January 13, 2027
- Succeeding: Barry Beauchamp

Member of the Wicomico County Council from the 4th district
- Incumbent
- Assumed office December 4, 2018
- Preceded by: John B. Hall

Personal details
- Born: Joshua A. Hastings; October 11, 1982 (age 44)
- Party: Democratic
- Spouse: Alyssa
- Children: 1
- Education: Salisbury University (BA, BS); University of Maryland, Baltimore County (MPP)
- Occupation: Political consultant

Joshua A. Hastings (born October 11, 1982) is an American politician who is a member-elect of the Maryland House of Delegates from District 38B. A member of the Democratic Party, he has represented the 4th district of the Wicomico County Council since 2018.

== Early life and education ==
Hastings was born on October 11, 1982. He grew up on an organic farm in Mardela Springs, Maryland. Hastings graduated from Salisbury University, earning a Bachelor of Science in business marketing in 2004 and a Bachelor of Arts in political science in 2005, and the University of Maryland, Baltimore County, where he earned a Master of Public Policy in 2017. He also holds certificates from the University of Maryland, College Park's Academy of Excellence in Local Governance and Georgetown University.

== Career ==
After graduating from Salisbury, Hastings worked as a staff assistant at Rice Consulting from 2007 to 2008. From 2010 to 2011, he was a legislative assistant to state senator Joan Carter Conway, afterwards working as a policy manager for the Eastern Shore Land Conservancy until 2018. Hastings was the program and policy director of the Forever Maryland Foundation from 2021 to 2024 and the foundation's executive director from 2023 to 2024, afterwards founding his own consultancy firm, Sound Mind Strategies.

From 2013 to 2020, Hastings was a member of the Rural Maryland Council, serving as the council's chair from 2016 to 2018. At the same time, he also served was the vice chair of the Lower Shore Land Trust, afterwards serving as the trust's deputy director from 2018 to 2021. Hastings was also a member of the Rural Legacy Board Advisory Committee from 2015 to 2018.

=== Wicomico County Council ===
Hastings ran to represent the fourth district of the Wicomico County Council in 2018, running unopposed in the Democratic primary and defeating Republican nominee Suzanah Cain in the general election on November 6, 2018. He was sworn in on December 4, 2018. Hastings was ran unopposed for a second term in 2022.

In July 2023, Hastings criticized the lack of cooperation between the county council and county executive Julie Giordano. In June 2024, he voted against a measure that would place a referendum on the general election ballot that, if approved by voters, would have abolished the position of county executive in Wicomico County.

=== Maryland House of Delegates ===
On September 26, 2025, Hastings announced that he would run for the Maryland House of Delegates in District 38B in 2026, challenging Republican incumbent Barry Beauchamp. The district was a top target of the Maryland Democratic Party. During his campaign, Hastings supported increasing job opportunities, bolstering public schools, and increasing access to affordable housing. Hastings ran unopposed in the Democratic primary and defeated Beauchamp in the general election on November 3, 2026. He will be sworn in on January 13, 2027, and will be a member of the Economic Matters Committee.

== Political positions ==
=== Development initiatives ===
During his 2018 county council campaign, Hastings supported expanding the Salisbury Regional Airport, building new kayak launches, and overhauling the county's trash and recycling disposal. In May 2024, he voted against moving the Paul Sarbanes Library Branch from downtown Salisbury to the site of the former Ward Museum of Wildfowl Art.

=== Education ===
During his 2018 county council campaign, Hastings supported increasing the county's per pupil education funding and the Imagine 2022 Education Plan.

=== Energy ===
In May 2024, Hastings supported the expansion of renewable energy in Wicomico County, but added that he supported making sure the county was not losing farmland with its expansion.

During his 2026 House of Delegates campaign, Hastings supported increasing in-state energy production through a combination of renewable energy sources.

=== Gun policy ===
In July 2024, Hastings voted against allowing residents with a valid wear and carry permit to carry firearms in public parks.

=== Housing ===
During his 2018 county council campaign, Hastings supported growth in Salisbury, Maryland. In August 2021, he voted in favor of a bill that would create the Hotel Or Residential Incentive Zone (HORIZON) and give developers tax abatements for building or renovating properties within the zone, which would include downtown Salisbury.

=== Immigration ===
In October 2025, Hastings opposed a proposed 287(g) program agreement between Wicomico County and U.S. Immigration and Customs Enforcement, saying that "abducting peaceful, working, Shore residents is an absolute waste of taxpayer money". The county council tabled the 287(g) agreement proposal in November 2025, at the request of county executive Julie Giordano to see if the Maryland General Assembly opts to ban such agreements during the 2026 legislative session. After Wicomico County entered into an 287(g) agreement in January 2026, Hastings called for transparency around the program's costs and to ensure that ICE "doesn't drag Wicomico's good name through the mud".

=== Redistricting ===
During the 2026 elections, Hastings voted against Question 3 and opposed redrawing Maryland's congressional districts, saying that lawmakers should "not be further gerrymandering and limiting voices".

== Personal life ==
Hastings is married to his wife, Alyssa, who is the Eastern Shore director for U.S. senator Chris Van Hollen. Together, they have one child. He lives in Salisbury, Maryland.

== Electoral history ==
2018 Wicomico County Council District 4 election
Primary election
Party	Candidate	Votes	%
Democratic	Josh Hastings	680	100.0
Total votes		680	100.0
General election
Democratic	Josh Hastings	2,671	59.2
Republican	Suzanah Cain	1,836	40.7
Write-in		3	0.1
Total votes		4,510	100.0

2022 Wicomico County Council District 4 election
Primary election
Party	Candidate	Votes	%
Democratic	Josh Hastings (incumbent)	848	100.0
Total votes		848	100.0
General election
Democratic	Josh Hastings (incumbent)	2,914	96.3
Write-in		113	3.7
Total votes		3,027	100.0
