= Mike McDermott (politician) =

American politician

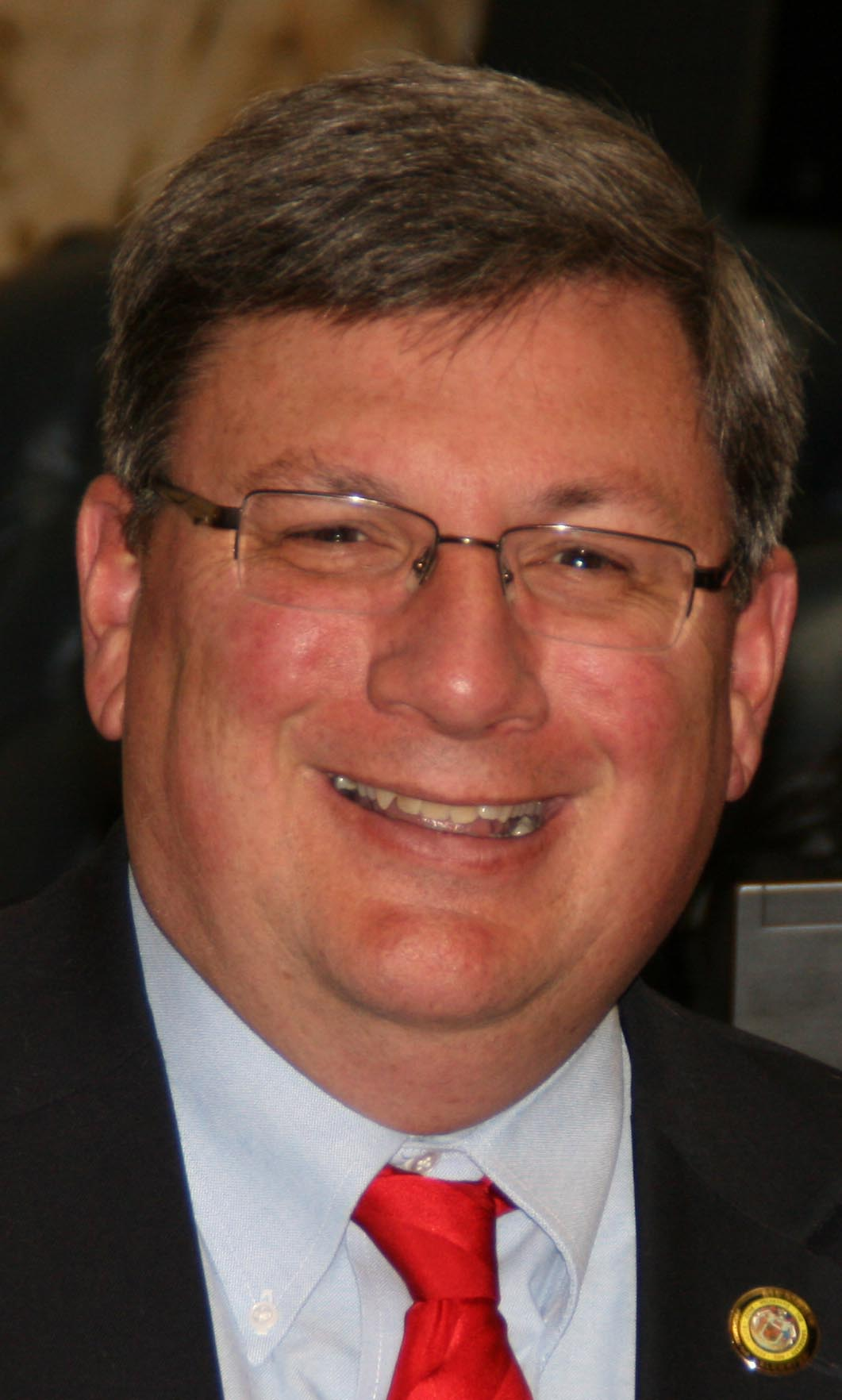

Member of the Maryland House of Delegates from the 38B district
- In office January 12, 2011 – January 14, 2015
- Preceded by: James Mathias
- Succeeded by: Carl Anderton Jr.

Personal details
- Born: November 22, 1961 (age 64) Hawthorne, California, U.S.
- Party: Republican
- Spouse: Laura
- Children: 2
- Education: Wake Technical Community College (AA)

Michael Andrew McDermott (born November 22, 1961) is an American politician who was a Republican member of the Maryland House of Delegates, representing district 38B, from 2011 to 2015.

== Background ==
McDermott was born in Hawthorne, California on November 22, 1961. He served in the U.S. Army Reserve from 1980 to 1986. During that time he attended Wake Technical Community College and earned his A.A. (criminal justice) in 1981. He then attended the North Carolina Criminal Justice Academy, where he graduated with honors in 1982.

Before election to the House of Delegates he served as Mayor of Pocomoke City and worked in law enforcement.

== In the legislature ==
McDermott was a member of the Judiciary Committee, from 2011-2015 and the criminal justice subcommittee. He served as the House Chair, Worcester County Delegation as well.
