= Carl Anderton Jr. =

American politician (born 1973)

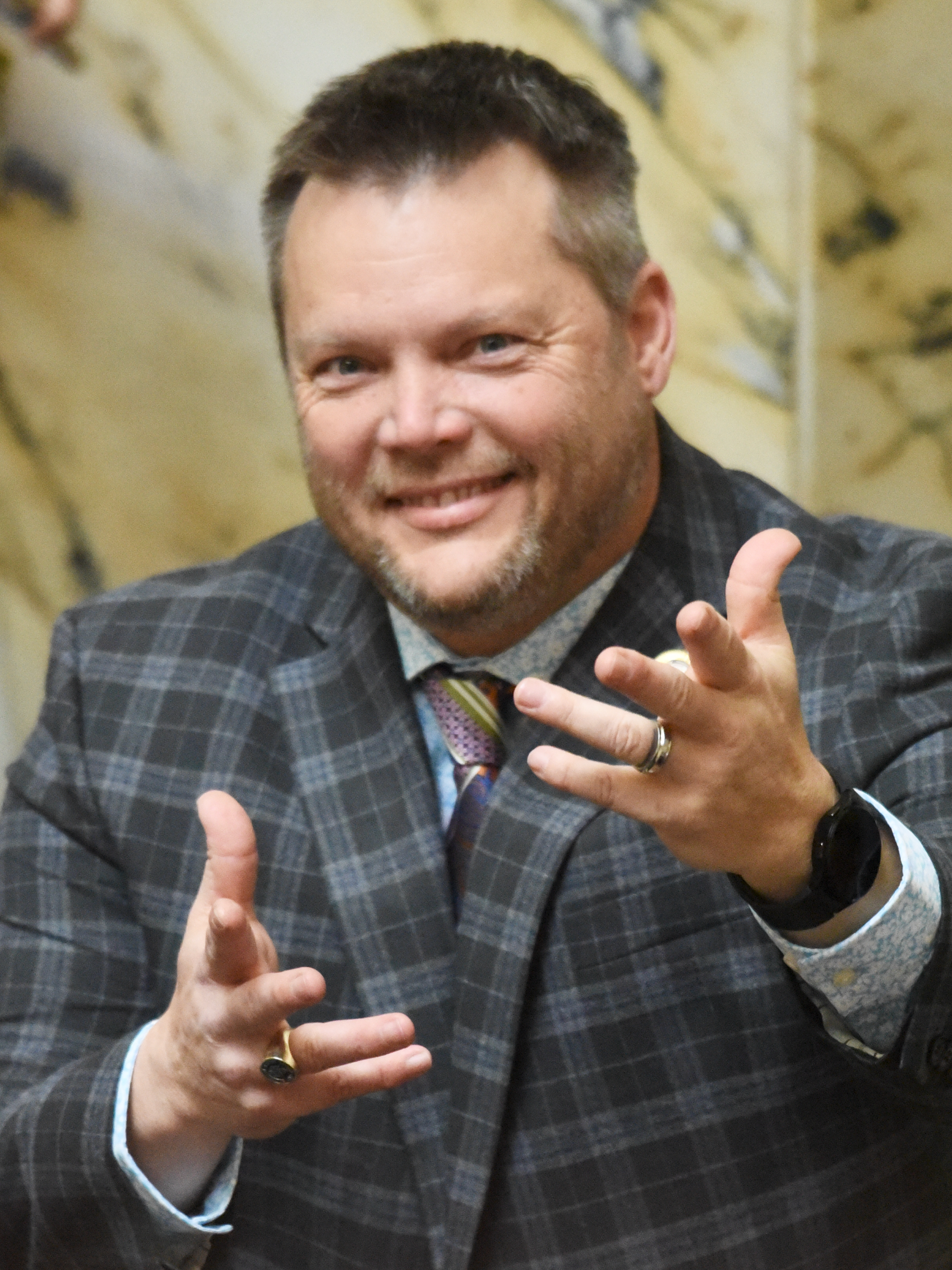
- Anderton in 2024

Member of the Maryland House of Delegates from the 38B district
- In office January 14, 2015 – July 23, 2024
- Preceded by: Norman Conway
- Succeeded by: Barry Beauchamp

Mayor of Delmar, Maryland
- In office 2011–2015
- Preceded by: P. Douglas Niblett
- Succeeded by: Karen H. Wells

Personal details
- Born: May 20, 1973 (age 53) Salisbury, Maryland, U.S.
- Party: Republican
- Children: 2

Carl L. Anderton Jr. (born May 20, 1973) is an American politician who was a Republican member of the Maryland House of Delegates, representing District 38B in Wicomico County, from 2015 to 2024.

== Early life and career ==
Carl Anderton Jr. was born in Salisbury, Maryland, on May 20, 1973, grew up in Kingston, and graduated from Washington High School in Princess Anne. He is married with two children.

Anderton was a member of the Town Commission of Delmar from 2006 to 2011, and served as the mayor of Delmar from 2011 to 2015. He served as the President of the Maryland Municipal League from 2013 to 2014.

In December 2013, Anderton declared his candidacy for the Maryland House of Delegates, seeking to challenge Democratic incumbent Norman Conway. During the general election, the Maryland Republican Party distributed fliers opposing Conway, portraying him in a black ski mask typically seen on bank robbers. Anderton distanced himself from the fliers, saying that he was unaware of the fliers until someone told him about it over the weekend and that he had no involvement with their distribution. He defeated Conway in the general election with 52.2 percent of the vote.

== In the legislature ==
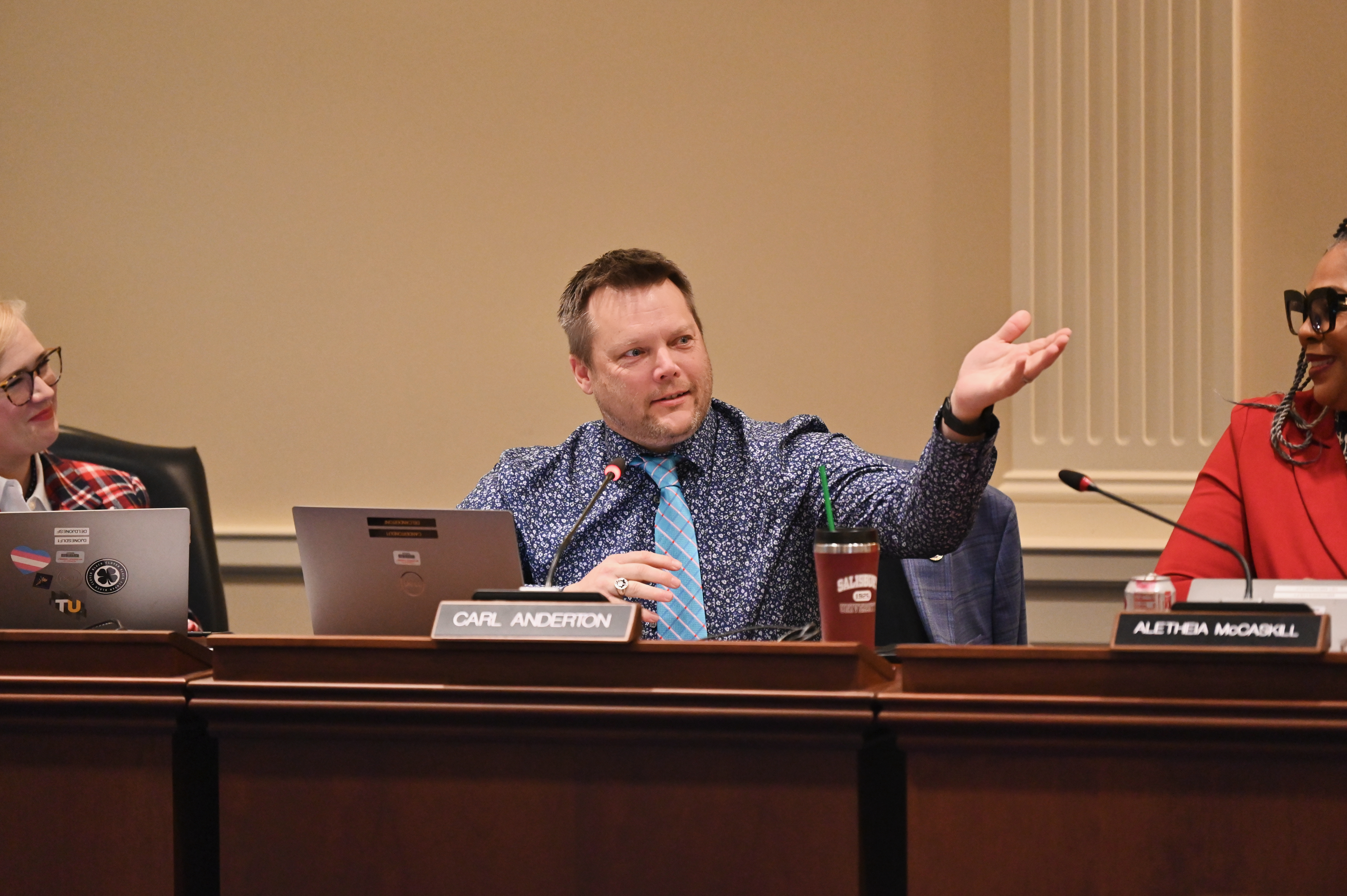
Anderton in the House Appropriations Committee, 2024

Anderton was sworn into the Maryland House of Delegates on January 14, 2015. He was a member of the Environment and Transportation Committee from 2015 to 2018 and from 2019 to 2023, and the Appropriations Committee in 2019 and from 2023 to 2024. Anderton was also a chair of the Wicomico County Delegation during his entire tenure and the vice-chair of the Eastern Shore Delegation in 2024.

Following the death of Wicomico County executive Robert L. "Bob" Culver Jr. in 2020, Anderton applied to replace Culver, but was defeated by cardiologist Rene Desmarais. Desmarais declined the county council's appointment, which prompted the council to reopen the application process, for which Anderton applied a second time. The council ultimately voted to keep County Administrator John D. Psota in place as acting county executive until the 2022 election. Anderton was rumored to be a candidate for Wicomico County executive in 2022, but announced in February 2022 that he would seek a third term to the Maryland House of Delegates.

On July 9, 2024, Anderton announced that he would be resigning from the Maryland House of Delegates on July 23, 2024, to become the director of rural strategy within the Maryland Department of Commerce.

== Political positions ==
Following his election win, Anderton expressed that he would reach across party lines. He supports deregulation, saying that overregulation in Maryland is "detrimental to Eastern Shore farmers and business owners."

=== Agriculture ===
Anderton opposed legislation introduced in the 2016 legislative session that would big chicken companies to handle and dispose of excess poultry manure.

=== Alcohol ===
Anderton introduced legislation during the 2015 legislative session, nicknamed "The Evo Bill" after the Evolution Craft Brewery in Salisbury, Maryland, that would allow Wicomico County to increase their beer production from 22,500 barrels to 45,000 barrels each year. The bill passed and was signed by Governor Larry Hogan on April 29, 2015.

Anderton introduced legislation during the 2020 legislative session that would allow the city of Salisbury to make its own alcohol licensing commission following controversy surrounding permits for the National Folk Festival. After a compromise was found between the city of Salisbury and Wicomico County, the legislation passed the Maryland General Assembly unanimously and became law on May 8, 2020.

=== Environment ===
Anderton is a long-time supporter of a project to construct a 32 turbine wind farm off the coast of Ocean City, Maryland, saying that it would bring jobs to the area. While he supports renewable energy alternatives like solar power and offshore wind, he does not think those energy sources are fully sustainable on their own and supports the construction of a natural gas pipeline on Maryland's Eastern Shore.

In September 2018, Anderton received a score of 83 percent from the Maryland League of Conservation Voters.

During the 2019 legislative session, Anderton cosponsored a bill that would hold Exelon financially responsible for cleanup costs associated with pollution spilling over the Conowingo Dam. He opposed legislation that banned oyster harvesting in sanctuaries.

=== Infrastructure ===
Anderton opposed legislation introduced in the 2016 legislative session that changed how transportation projects are prioritized in Maryland, arguing that it would put projects on the Eastern Shore on the backburner.

Anderton introduced legislation during the 2017 legislative session that would have incrementally increased highway user revenue appropriations to Maryland towns. The bill did not receive a vote during the legislative session, but was reintroduced in 2018. The bill passed and was signed into law by Governor Hogan on April 24, 2018.

=== Marijuana ===
In 2015, Anderton voted alongside six other Republicans for a bill that would decriminalize the possession of marijuana paraphernalia. During the 2018 legislative session, Anderton supported a bill that would legalize the production and sale of hemp in Maryland, saying that "passing the bill would be a win for lawmakers and farmers." Anderton supports using a referendum to let voters decide on legalizing recreational marijuana in Maryland.

=== Minimum wage ===
Anderton opposed a bill that would raise the minimum wage to $15 an hour, instead promoting a compromise bill proposed by Governor Hogan that would raise the state's minimum wage to $12.10 by 2022.

=== Taxes ===
Anderton campaigned on repealing the "rain tax" and broadening Wicomico County's enterprise zones. Anderton supports legalizing sports betting in Maryland, saying that the state "needs additional sources of revenue in order to get more funding for things like education resources."

== Electoral history ==
Maryland House of Delegates District 38B Republican primary election, 2014
Party	Candidate	Votes	%
Republican	Carl Anderton Jr.	1,543	100.0

Maryland House of Delegates District 38B election, 2014
Party	Candidate	Votes	%
Republican	Carl Anderton Jr.	5,617	52.2
Democratic	Norman Conway (incumbent)	5,133	47.7
Write-in		5	0.0

Maryland House of Delegates District 38B election, 2018
Party	Candidate	Votes	%
Republican	Carl Anderton Jr. (incumbent)	10,021	94.3
Write-in		611	5.7

Maryland House of Delegates District 38B election, 2022
Party	Candidate	Votes	%
Republican	Carl Anderton Jr. (incumbent)	8,026	94.5
Write-in		470	5.5
