= Charles A. McClenahan =

American politician

Member of the Maryland House of Delegates from the 38th district
- In office January 22, 1992 – January 8, 2003
- Preceded by: J. Lowell Stoltzfus
- Succeeded by: D. Page Elmore
- Constituency: Somerset, Wicomico, & Worcester Counties

Mayor of Crisfield
- In office 1978–1982

Personal details
- Born: February 7, 1941 Wilmington, North Carolina, United States
- Died: May 11, 2017 (aged 76) Wilmington, Delaware, United States
- Party: Republican

Charles A. McClenahan (February 7, 1941 – May 11, 2017) was a member of the Maryland House of Delegates for District 38, which covers Somerset, Wicomico, & Worcester Counties.

== Background ==
Delegate McClenahan was appointed to the Maryland House of Delegates to replace J. Lowell Stoltzfus who was appointed to the Maryland State Senate. He was defeated in the 2002 primary election by D. Page Elmore. He died on May 11, 2017, at the age of 76.

== Education ==
He attended Crisfield High School in Crisfield, Maryland, which is in Somerset County, Maryland.

== Career ==
Prior to joining the Maryland House of Delegates, McClenahan was a project director for the Somerset County Community Action Agency from 1966 until 1976. Since 1979, he has been a partner and chair of Landmark Insurance, Inc.

In addition to his career, Delegate McClenahan is also active in many organizations, including being a member of the board of directors for the Lower Shore Sheltered Workshop from 1971 until 1978, the J. Millard Tawes Foundation since 1980, and the United Way of the Lower Eastern Shore since 1986. McClenahan was also the chair of the Committee to Build Somerset County Public Golf Course, a member of the Lower Eastern Shore Mayors' Association, the Crisfield Area Chamber of Commerce, the Salisbury State University Foundation, and the Tangier Sound Music Festival. He was also a member of the Delmarva Water Transport Committee, and the Delmarva Industrial Developers Association.

== In the legislature ==
During Delegate McClenahan's tenure in the Maryland General Assembly, he served on the Economic Matters Committee, the Joint Committee on Health Care Delivery and Financing, the Joint Committee on Protocol, and the Joint Committee on Administrative, Executive and Legislative Review. He was also the chair of the Somerset County Delegation and the vice-chair of the Eastern Shore Delegation.

== Election results ==
- 2002 Primary Race for Maryland House of Delegates – District 38A

Voters to choose one:

Name	Votes	Percent	Outcome
D. Page Elmore, Rep.	1,909	61%	Won
Charles A. McClenahan, Rep.	1,223	39%	Lost

- 1998 Race for Maryland House of Delegates – District 38

Voters to choose one for Somerset County:

Name	Votes	Percent	Outcome
Charles A. McClenahan, Rep.	17,112	52%	Won
Ernest J. Leatherbury Sr., Dem.	15,711	48%	Lost

- 1998 Race for Maryland House of Delegates – District 38

Voters to choose one for Wicomico County:

Name	Votes	Percent	Outcome
Norman H. Conway, Dem.	18,284	55%	Won
Christopher Mills, Rep.	14,896	45%	Lost

- 1998 Race for Maryland House of Delegates – District 38

Voters to choose one for Worcester County:

Name	Votes	Percent	Outcome
Bennett Bozman, Dem.	21,155	66%	Won
Joseph Frederick Schanno, Rep.	10,900	34%	Lost

- 1994 Race for Maryland House of Delegates – District 38

Voters to choose three:

Name	Votes	Percent	Outcome
Bennett Bozman, Dem.	19,702	22%	Won
Norman H. Conway, Dem.	17,593	20%	Won
Charles A. McClenahan, Rep.	16,700	19%	Won
Charles A. Bruce Jr., Dem.	12,591	14%	Lost
Christopher E. Mills, Rep.	12,296	14%	Lost
Ronald L. Bireley, Rep.	10,570	12%	Lost
