= James N. Mathias Jr. =

American politician

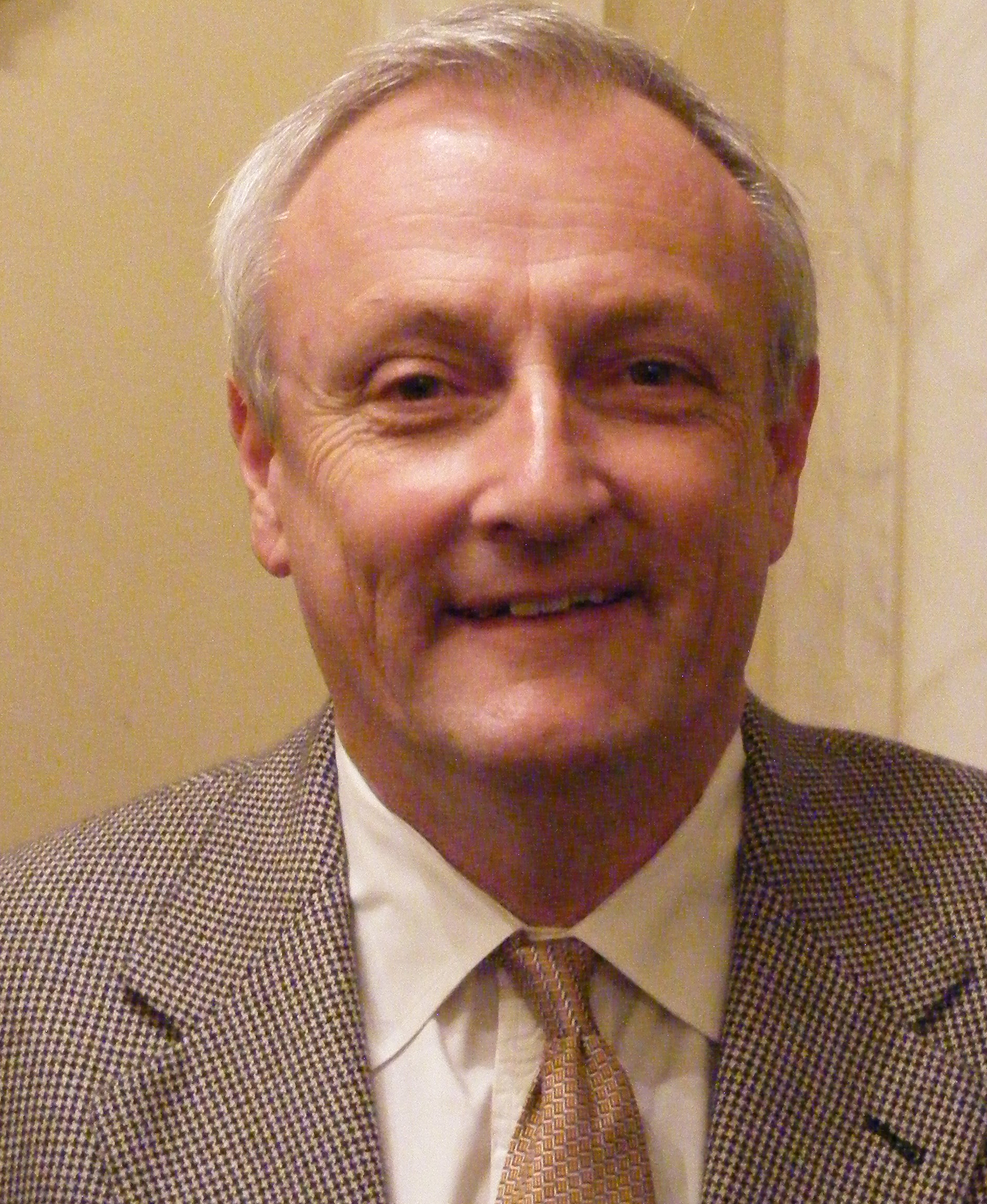
- Mathias in 2007

Member of the Maryland Senate from the 38th district
- In office January 13, 2011 – January 9, 2019
- Preceded by: J. Lowell Stoltzfus
- Succeeded by: Mary Beth Carozza

Member of the Maryland House of Delegates from the 38B district
- In office 2006–2010
- Preceded by: Bennett Bozman
- Succeeded by: Mike McDermott

Mayor of Ocean City, Maryland
- In office 1996–2006
- Preceded by: Roland E. Powell
- Succeeded by: Rick Meehan

Personal details
- Born: September 2, 1951 (age 74) Baltimore, Maryland, U.S.
- Party: Democratic
- Spouse: Kathleen Petry
- Children: 2

James N. Mathias Jr. (born September 2, 1951) is an American politician from Ocean City, Maryland. Mathias served in the Maryland State Senate from 2011 until 2019, was a member of the Maryland House of Delegates from 2006 to 2010, and served as mayor of Ocean City from 1996 until 2006.

== Background ==
The former mayor of Ocean City, Maryland, was born on September 2, 1951, in Baltimore, Maryland. During his childhood, he lived in Baltimore City, Baltimore County and Carroll County. He attended high school at Calvert Hall College in Towson, graduating in 1969. In 1974, Mathias graduated from the University of Maryland, Baltimore County, with a Bachelor of Arts degree in Political Science.

Mathias first came to Ocean City as a child, with his parents for summer vacations and it was then that he first fell in love with Ocean City, Maryland. His first Ocean City summer job was at Ponzetti's Pizza on the Boardwalk in 1972. Mathias and his father established a business in downtown Ocean City and built an amusement and arcade operation.

In 1978 he married Kathleen "Kathy" Arlee Petry, who died in August 2011. They had two children. Mathias currently works as the Director of Governmental Affairs for the University of Maryland Eastern Shore.

== Political career ==
Mathias began his political career in Ocean City in 1987 when he was appointed to the Ocean City Board of Zoning Appeals, where he served until 1990. In October 1990, he was elected as an Ocean City Councilman and was re-elected to that post in 1994. In October 1996, Mathias was elected Mayor of Ocean City. He was re-elected in 1998, 2000, 2002, and 2004. In 2006, Mathias was elected to the Maryland House of Delegates for District 38B, along with fellow Democrat Norman Conway of Salisbury, where he would serve for one term before running to replace retiring State Senator J. Lowell Stoltzfus. Mathias went on to defeat Michael James, general manager of Ocean City's Carousel Hotel and Resort, in the 2010 general election by less than 700 votes. Mathias won re-election in 2014 over Republican state delegate and former mayor of Pocomoke City Mike McDermott. In the 2018 general election, Mathias lost his re-election bid to Republican state delegate and former Ehrlich administration official Mary Beth Carozza, also of Ocean City.
