= Crisfield Academy and High School =

Coordinates: 37.9874°N 75.8422°W

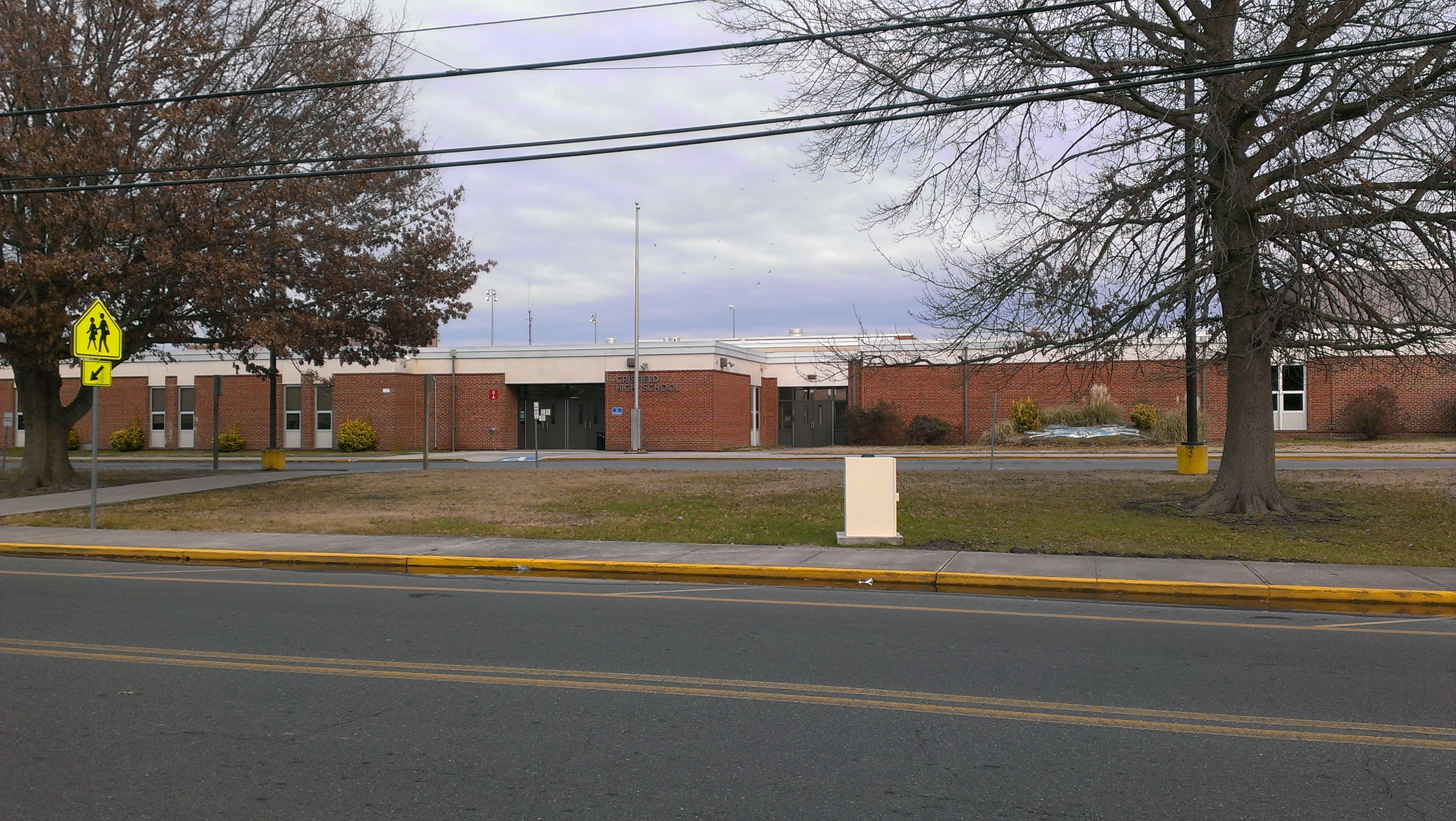

Location
- 210 North Somerset Ave. Crisfield, Maryland; United States

Information
- Type: Public High School (8-12)
- Established: 1908
- School district: Somerset County Public Schools
- NCES School ID: 240057001201
- Principal: Keisha Evans
- Enrollment: 379 (2021-22)
- Colors: Purple and Gold
- Mascot: Crabbers
- Rival: Washington Academy and High School
- Website: http://chs.somerset.k12.md.us

Crisfield Academy and High School (commonly abbreviated to CAHS), also once known as simply Crisfield High School (CHS), is a public high school in the city of Crisfield in Somerset County, Maryland, United States. It is located in the Somerset County Public Schools district and handles five grades: 8th grade is handled in an "academy" section of the school, while grades 9 through 12 are handled as high school. The school is on North Somerset Avenue, between the intersections of Potomac Street and Mercury Lane, and is close to Maryland Route 413. It has the distinction of being the southernmost high school in the state of Maryland.

Crisfield High School was established in 1908 as the first public school in lower Somerset County, succeeding the old Crisfield Academy. It has moved numerous times since then, going through expansions, several arsons, and desegregation of schools through its lifetime. For the past fifty years, the county school system has been attempting to consolidate schools, but this has been largely resisted, even though the enrollment for the school has been steadily decreasing over the years.

The school has sports teams for basketball, baseball, softball, field hockey, soccer, and indoor/outdoor track & field. Its high school band, which participates in concerts and parades, is affectionately known as the Pride of Somerset. Also, in the 2003-2004 school year, an AJROTC was added to the school's various extracurricular activities.

== History ==
Prior to 1908, there was only one educational facility in Crisfield: the original Crisfield Academy, located on Asbury Avenue near the intersection with Somerset Avenue. In 1908, the very first Crisfield High School was built, succeeding the Academy. This school, however, only served the white population of Crisfield. This building was closed in 1926 when a new, larger building was constructed, on Somerset Avenue. A school had also been built shortly before World War II for the African-American population, named Crisfield Colored High School, which succeeded limited facilities for those students whom beforehand were only equipped for teaching up to sixth grade. This building was located on Collins Street, near the current site of Family Dollar. This building was succeeded by Woodson High School on South Somerset Avenue.

A third high school building opened in 1953 at the site of the current high school, with two high school buildings operating in Crisfield on Somerset Avenue at this time. By the 1969-1970 school year, desegregation of high school had taken place, and Woodson High School had been renovated into the area middle school as the high school students were moved to CHS. In 1972, the high school building built in 1926 was destroyed in an arson fire. After the fire, a new building was constructed on the property of the 1953 building. This is the building currently located at 210 North Somerset Avenue and in current operation, though it has gone through expansions and renovations since then.

The Somerset County Public School System has been attempting since the 1960s to consolidate Crisfield High with Washington High School, which serves northern Somerset County, as the dwindling population of Somerset County has caused school enrollment to shrink as well. The schools have largely resisted this, though the middle school was closed at the end of the 2003-2004 school year, and after an extensive renovation reopened for the 2004-2005 school year as Carter G. Woodson Elementary School in September 2004. Somerset Intermediate School, located in Westover for 6th and 7th graders of Somerset County, was built during the spring and summer of 2004, and opened for students in September 2004. Crisfield High School's name was changed to Crisfield Academy and High School, and also took on the 8th grade students in lower Somerset County beginning with the 2004-2005 school year.

== Students ==
Crisfield's graduation rate has been steadily declining over the past 12 years. In 2007, the school graduated 63.5% of its seniors, down from a high of 86.7% in 2002.

Crisfield is a fairly small high school. In 2007, the school showed its largest enrollment over the previous 12 years.

== Extracurricular activities ==
Crisfield Academy and High School hosts several different sports, most noticeably basketball (known as the Crisfield Crabbers), which wins the school most of its sports championships. The school also has a soccer, and field hockey team.

CHS also has a high school band, which is affectionately known as the "Pride of Somerset" as it was once the largest organization of any sort in the county; however, this is no longer the case, as even the Washington High School band is larger at present. The school also has an AJROTC, implemented during the 2003-2004 school year.

State Champions

- 2000 - Boys' Basketball
- 1982 - Boys' Basketball
- 1980 - Boys' Basketball
- 1978 - Boys' Basketball
- 1977 - Boys' Soccer
- 1973 - Boys' Basketball
- 1964 - Boys' Basketball
- 1961 - Boys' Basketball
- 1957 - Boys' Basketball

Finalist

- 1969 - Boys' Soccer
- 1962 - Boys' Basketball
- 1956 - Boys' Basketball

Semi-finalists

- 1998 - Boys' Soccer
- 1997 - Boys' Basketball
- 1980 - Boys' Soccer
- 1979 - Boys' Basketball
- 1978 - Boys' Soccer
- 1977 - Boys' Basketball
- 1970 - Boys' Basketball
- 1960 - Boys' Basketball
- 1959 - Boys' Basketball
- 1958 - Boys' Basketball

== Notable alumni ==
- Harry Clifton "Curley" Byrd - Former President of the University of Maryland, College Park, graduated in 1905.
- Charles A. McClenahan - former member of the Maryland House of Delegates
