= Barry Beauchamp =

American politician

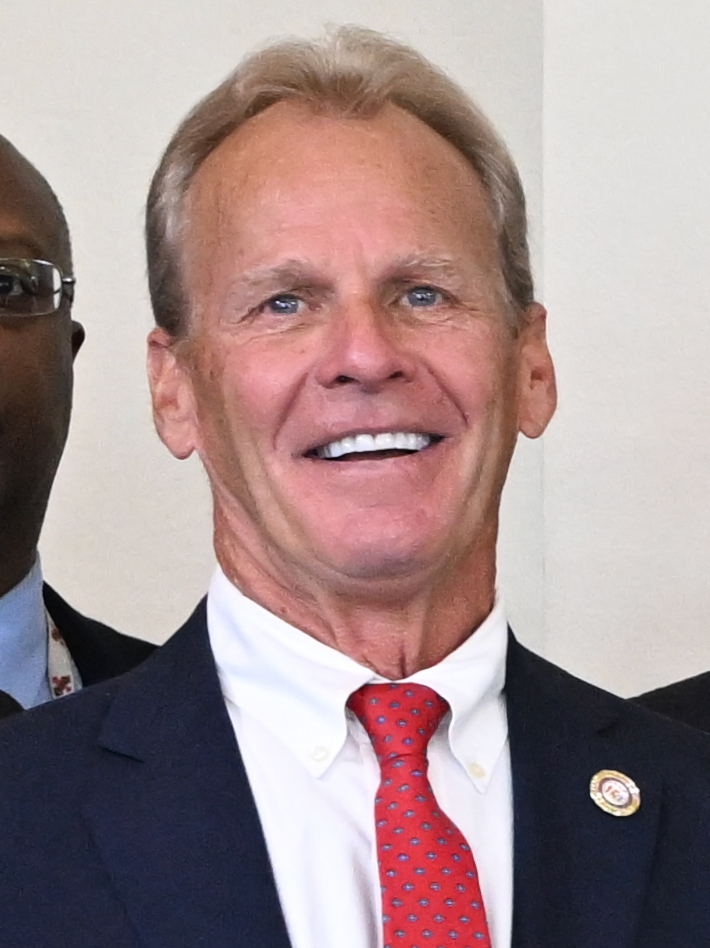
- Beauchamp in 2026

Member of the Maryland House of Delegates from the 38B district
- Incumbent
- Assumed office September 10, 2024
- Appointed by: Wes Moore
- Preceded by: Carl Anderton Jr.

Personal details
- Born: 1960 or 1961 (age 65–66) Wicomico County, Maryland, U.S.
- Party: Republican
- Spouse: Susan
- Children: 2
- Education: Salisbury University (BA)

Barry S. Beauchamp (born 1960 or 1961) is an American business owner and politician who has served as a member of the Maryland House of Delegates from District 38B since 2024.

== Background ==
Beauchamp was born in 1960 or 1961 and raised in Wicomico County, Maryland, graduating from James M. Bennett Senior High School and attending Salisbury University, where he earned a Bachelor of Arts degree in business administration and management. He has served as a volunteer firefighter, engineer, and assistant chief to the Salisbury City Fire Department for over 25 years, and has worked as a licensed realtor since 1987. He also operated his own excavation business, Beauchamp Brothers Construction, since 1985.

Beauchamp was elected to the Wicomico County Republican Central Committee in 2022, during which he ran a campaign opposing COVID-19 pandemic-related protocols and face masks. He served as the committee's chair in 2024 and was considered by Maryland Matters to be a political ally of Wicomico County Executive Julie Giordano. In September 2023, Giordano nominated Beauchamp to the Wicomico County Personnel Board, but his nomination was rejected by the Wicomico County Council. In 2024, Governor Wes Moore appointed Beauchamp to the Maryland State Board of Onsite Wastewater Professionals.

== Maryland House of Delegates ==
In July 2024, Beauchamp applied to fill a vacancy in the Maryland House of Delegates left by Carl Anderton Jr., who resigned from the Maryland House of Delegates to become the director of rural strategy within the Maryland Department of Commerce. During central committee interviews, he told committee members that he hoped to work in a bipartisan manner in the General Assembly and listed expanding the Salisbury Regional Airport, getting funding for a new health and human sciences building at Salisbury University, and improving streetscapes in Delmar as his priorities. The Wicomico County Republican Central Committee unanimously voted to nominate Beauchamp to fill the seat on August 5, 2024, and Governor Wes Moore appointed him to the seat on August 19. Beauchamp was sworn in on September 10, 2024.

Beauchamp ran for a full four-year term in 2026, but was defeated by Democratic nominee Josh Hastings in the general election.

== Political positions ==
During the 2026 legislative session, Beauchamp opposed the congressional redistricting plan proposed by the Governor's Redistricting Advisory Commission, calling it "taxation without representation".

== Personal life ==
Beauchamp is married to his wife, Susan, who is a member of the Wicomico County Board of Education from District 3 as of 2024. He has two daughters.
