= Mary Beth Carozza =

American politician (born 1961)

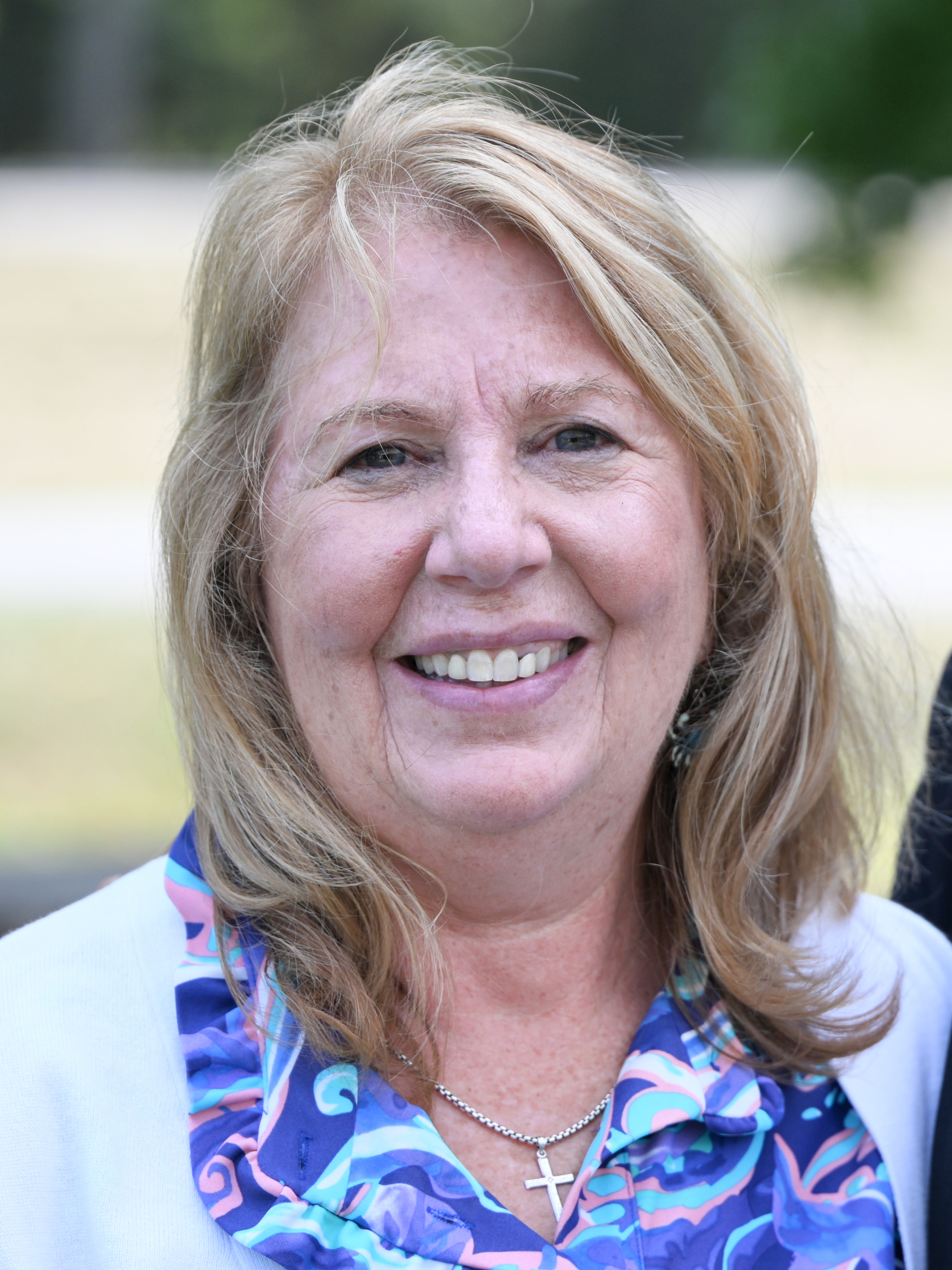
- Carozza in 2024

Member of the Maryland Senate from the 38th district
- Incumbent
- Assumed office January 9, 2019
- Preceded by: Jim Mathias

Member of the Maryland House of Delegates from the 38C district
- In office January 14, 2015 – January 9, 2019
- Preceded by: Seat established
- Succeeded by: Wayne A. Hartman

Personal details
- Born: February 13, 1961 (age 65) Baltimore, Maryland, U.S.
- Party: Republican
- Education: Catholic University of America (BA, MA)
- Profession: Consultant

Mary Beth Carozza (born February 13, 1961) is an American politician who is a Republican member of the Maryland Senate, representing District 38 since 2019. She previous represented District 38C in the Maryland House of Delegates from 2015 to 2019.

Born in Baltimore and raised on Maryland's Eastern Shore, Carozza graduated from Catholic University of America. She began her career working as a congressional staffer for various Republican U.S. senators and U.S. representatives before serving as the deputy assistant secretary of defense for legislative affairs under U.S. Defense Secretary Donald Rumsfeld and as a deputy chief of staff to Maryland Governor Bob Ehrlich. Carozza was elected to the Maryland House of Delegates in 2014, serving for one term before being elected to the Maryland Senate in 2018, defeating Democratic incumbent Jim Mathias.

== Early life and career ==
Carozza was born in Baltimore on February 13, 1961, to Tony and Mary Pat Carozza. Her family moved to the Eastern Shore when she was in the fifth grade and spent her summers working in her parents' business, Beefy's. After graduating from Stephen Decatur High School, Carozza attended the Catholic University of America on a tennis scholarship, where she received a Bachelor of Arts degree in political philosophy and a Master of Arts degree in American government.

After graduating from Catholic University, Carozza worked as a staffer for congressional Republicans, including U.S. Senators William Cohen and Susan Collins, and U.S. Representatives Mike DeWine, Dave Hobson and Steve Stivers. She worked as deputy assistant secretary of defense for legislative affairs for Secretary Donald Rumsfeld from 2001 to 2003. Carozza was at The Pentagon during the September 11 attacks, during which she laid out body bags around the American Airlines Flight 77 crash site and helped Secretary Rumsfeld prepare for a press briefing on the attacks. From 2003 to 2007, she worked as a deputy chief of staff to Governor Bob Ehrlich, where she got to know Larry Hogan, Ehrlich's appointments secretary.

== In the legislature ==
Carozza first became involved with electoral politics after Worcester County commissioner Louise Gulyas suggested Carozza run for her seat when she retired, which she considered until Ellen Sauerbrey encouraged her to run for the Maryland House of Delegates. She filed to run for state delegate in the newly created district 38C in 2013, during which she ran unopposed in the Republican primary and defeated Democratic nominee Judy Davis in the general election with 74 percent of the vote. Carozza was sworn in on January 12, 2015, and appointed to the House Appropriations Committee.

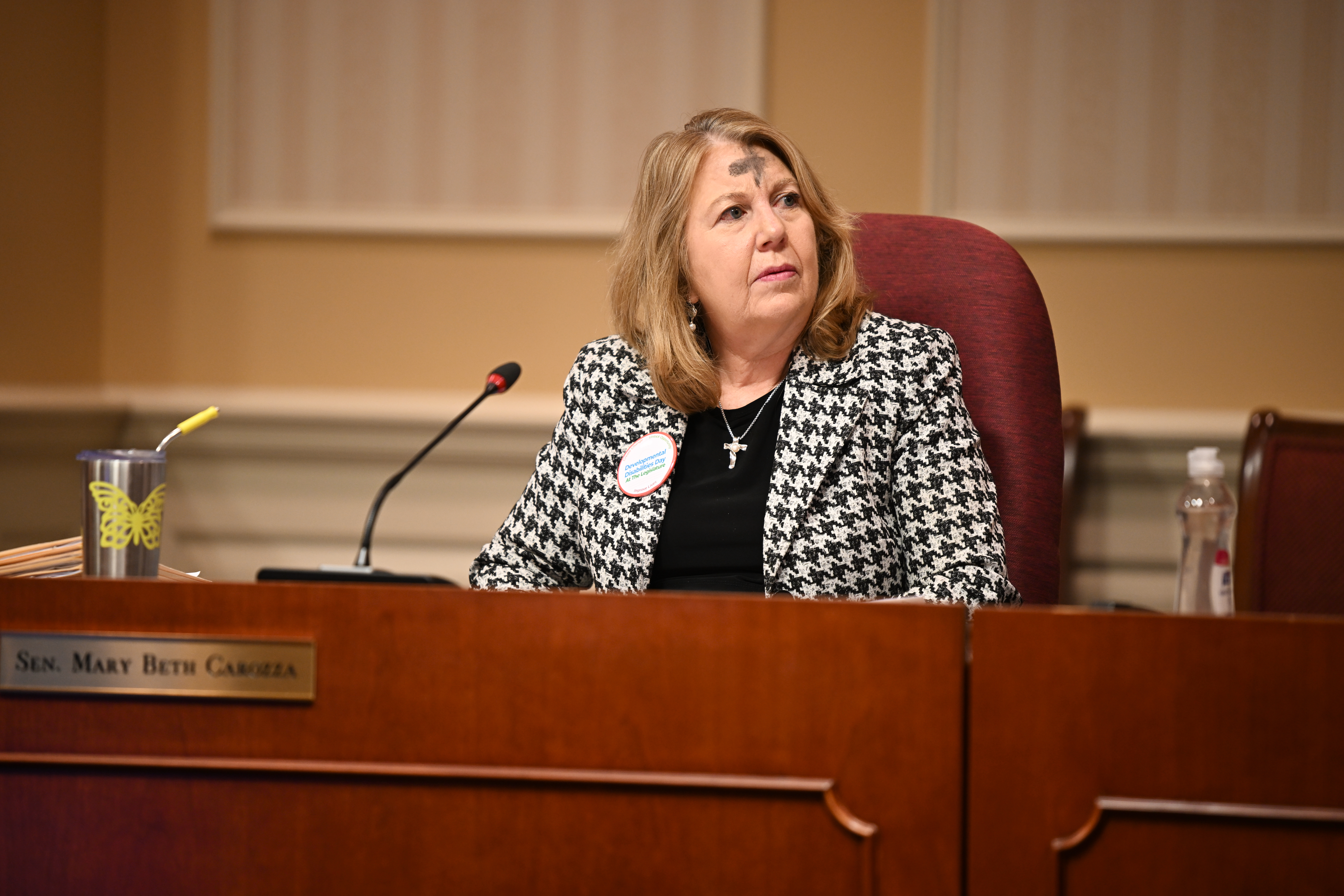
Carozza in the Maryland Senate, 2023

In November 2017, Carozza, with the backing of Governor Hogan, announced her candidacy to the Maryland Senate, seeking to challenge Democratic state senator Jim Mathias, a top Republican target, in the 2018 state senate elections. She defeated Mathias in the general election, receiving 53 percent of the vote. Carozza was sworn in as a member of the Maryland Senate on January 9, 2019, and has served as a member of the Education, Energy, and the Environment Committee during her entire tenure. Since 2021, she has served as the policy and communications chair of the Maryland Senate Republican Caucus.

== Political positions ==
=== Agriculture and fishing ===
During the 2022 legislative session, Carozza introduced a bill that would exempt farm structures used for agritourism activities from certain requirements typically applied to commercial buildings. The bill received a favorable report from the Senate Education, Health, and Environmental Affairs Committee.

During the 2026 legislative session, she introduced a bill that would allow farmers to build new livestock housing without first getting a permit.

In January 2026, Carozza urged Governor Wes Moore to request federal disaster assistance for the 2026 Potomac River sewage spill, which she said was, combined with challenging markets and wintry weather conditions, impacting Maryland's commercial oyster fishing industry.

=== Alcohol ===
Carozza introduced legislation in the 2018 legislative session that would allow Worcester County to increase its beer production from 15,500 gallons to 31,000 gallons each year. The bill passed and was signed into law in March 2018. In 2019, she introduced a bill to decrease the permitted proximity of liquor stores to churches, schools, public libraries, and youth centers in Somerset County from 300 feet to 200 feet. The bill passed and became law without Governor Hogan's signature on May 25, 2019. During the 2022 legislative session, Carozza introduced legislation that would abolish Somerset County's alcohol dispensary system, which requires that liquor be purchased through county-run stores, and create a $5,000 license fee for business owners that want to sell liquor.

In March 2021, Carozza voted in favor of legislation that would continue the practice of selling beer, wine, and spirits through carryout or delivery for off-site consumption. The bill passed and became law.

=== Crime and policing ===
Following a string of false bomb threats made against schools and other public facilities across Delmarva in early 2016, Carozza introduced legislation that would strengthen punishments for those who make fake bomb threats. The bill passed and was signed into law by Governor Hogan on May 19, 2016. During the 2017 legislative session and following several serious boating incidents in Ocean City, Maryland, Carozza introduced a bill to ban bow riding.

During the 2017 legislative session, Carozza introduced a bill to increase the penalties for causing life-threatening injuries while operating a vehicle negligently. The bill was reintroduced during the 2019 and 2021 legislative sessions. The bill passed and became law.

During the 2018 legislative session and following several troubling motorized special events in Ocean City, Carozza introduced legislation that would allow for the creation of special event enforcement zones to enforce enhanced fines and penalties on reckless drivers. She introduced legislation aimed at strengthening the penalties for violations in these special event zones during the 2019 and 2021 legislative sessions.

In June 2021, following the release of a viral video showing Ocean City police officers exerting force against a group of Black teenagers on the boardwalk, Carozza made a statement defending the Ocean City police, saying that the individuals detained in the incident were arrested for multiple violations including disorderly conduct, failure to obey a police order, obstructing and hindering, second-degree assault, and resisting arrest.

=== Education ===
During the 2019 legislative session, Carozza opposed a bill that would repeal Governor Larry Hogan's executive order mandating that Maryland public schools start after Labor Day. The Maryland General Assembly voted to override Hogan's veto on the bill in March 2019.

During the 2021 legislative session, Carozza opposed legislation that would give collective bargaining rights to full- and part-time employees at all of the state's community colleges. She also questioned legislation that expands required training for school resource officers to include restorative approaches and prevents officers from enforcing discipline except to prevent or intervene in a situation where "serious bodily injury with an imminent threat of serious harm" is at stake, referring to the 2018 shooting at Great Mills High School in Southern Maryland.

In December 2025, Carozza said she supported reevaluating the Blueprint for Maryland's Future amid a $1.5 billion budget deficit.

=== Environment ===
In 2015, Carozza spearheaded an effort to encourage the United States Army Corps of Engineers to dredge the inlet of Ocean City, Maryland, arguing that the shallow water in the inlet puts the economy of Worcester County in jeopardy. Following Carozza's request, the Army Corps of Engineers announced plans to dredge the inlet in August 2015. During the 2016 legislative session, she introduced legislation that would authorize the use of hydraulic dredging to catch hard-shell clams between the Verrazano Bridge and the Maryland-Virginia state line.

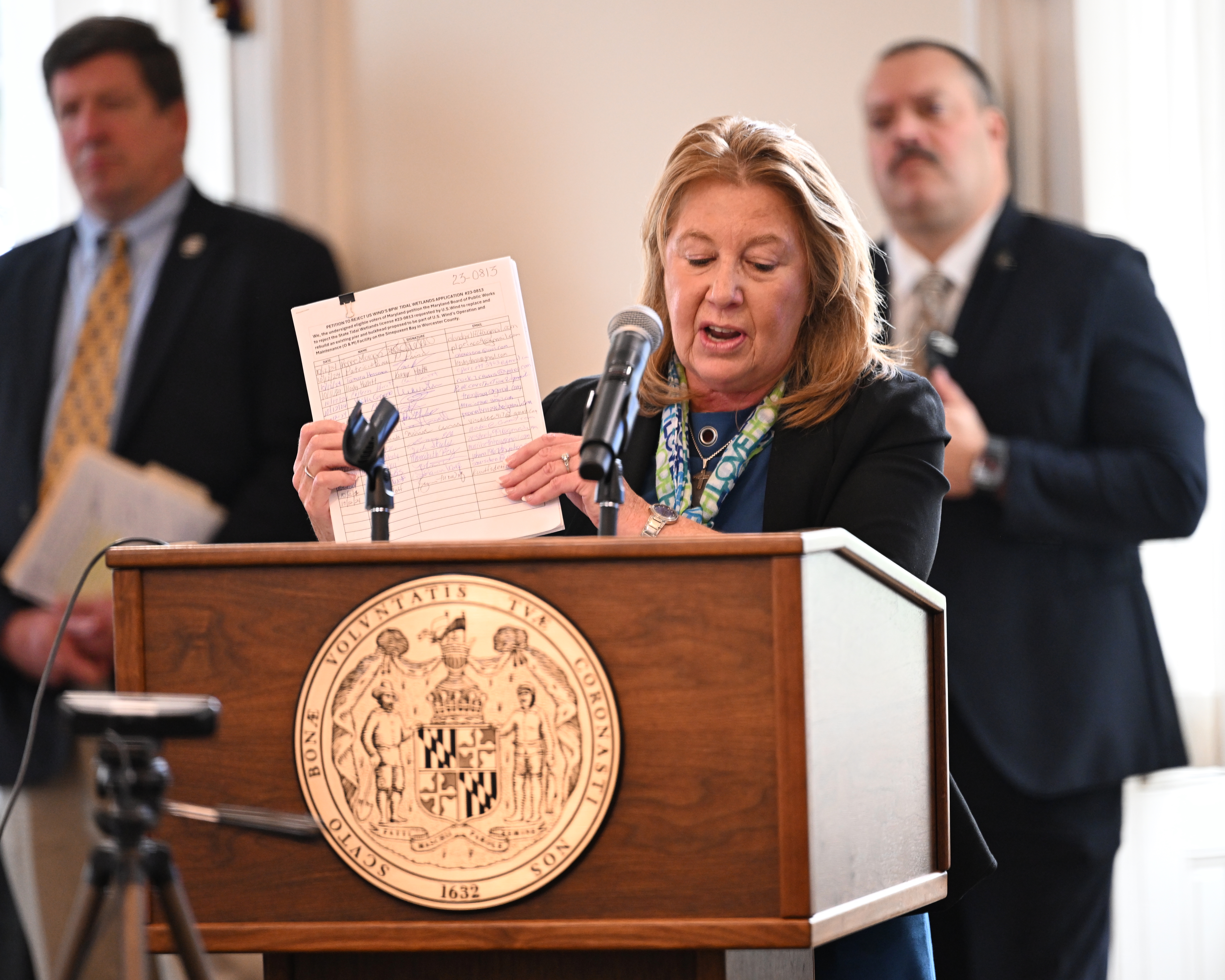
Carozza holds up a petition of voter signatures while testifying against US Wind's proposals to build a wind farm off the coast of Ocean City, 2024

During the 2017 legislative session, Carozza opposed legislation that would boost the state's renewable energy standards. In 2018, she introduced a bill that would move the proposed wind farm in Ocean City further from the shore. The measure was killed by the House Economic Matters Committee. In 2021, she urged the Maryland Public Service Commission to move a proposed wind farm off the coast of Ocean City farther offshore, insisting that the turbines would damage views from the shore, jeopardizing tourism, real estate values, and the local economy. In November 2024, Carozza testified to the Maryland Board of Public Works against allowing US Wind to construct a concrete pier on the Sinepuxent Bay as part of its wind farm proposal. In August 2025, she supported the Trump administration's plans to revoke federal offshore wind permits for US Wind's proposed wind farm off the coast of Ocean City, Maryland, saying that the project would "drive up costs with an unreliable energy source" and harm the local environment.

During the 2021 legislative session, Carozza introduced a bill to prohibit the deliberate release of balloons into the stratosphere. The bill passed and became law on May 30, 2021.

During the 2026 legislative session, Carozza introduced a bill that would study the full system costs of different forms of energy generation, including nuclear energy, natural gas, offshore wind, and solar. The bill passed the Senate unanimously and was later added to the Utility RELIEF Act.

=== Healthcare ===
During a debate on legislation that would require businesses to provide paid sick leave to most of its employees, Carozza introduced an amendment to the bill that would increase the threshold for eligibility from 90 days to 120 days. The amendment was rejected by the Maryland House of Delegates.

During the 2022 legislative session and following the death of local resident Chris Trimper, who suffered an extreme allergic reaction during a reception at the Ocean Downs Casino in October 2019, Carozza introduced a bill to allow restaurants to carry and administer EpiPens during emergency situations. The bill passed unanimously and was signed by Governor Hogan on March 19, 2020.

=== Immigration ===
During her 2018 state senate campaign, Carozza said that she would vote against any legislation that would make Maryland a sanctuary state. During the 2021 legislative session, she opposed a bill that banned local jails from housing detainees for Immigration and Customs Enforcement (ICE). The bill passed the Maryland General Assembly but received a veto from Governor Hogan in May 2021; the General Assembly overrode the veto in December 2021. During the 2026 legislative session, Carozza opposed a bill that would prohibit counties from entering into 287(g) program agreements with ICE, saying that the bill would make Maryland become Minneapolis, alluding to U.S. immigration enforcement in the city. In April 2026, she opposed the Community Trust Act, which would require ICE to present a judicial warrant to compel state action and only allow for someone to be detained for ICE in a state or local correctional facility in certain situations.

=== Minimum wage ===
During a debate on legislation introduced during the 2019 legislative session that would raise the Maryland minimum wage to $15 an hour by 2028, Carozza introduced an amendment that would slow the increase of the minimum wage overall and apply a 20 percent lower regional wage in parts of the state outside of Montgomery County, Prince George's County, Howard County, Anne Arundel County, Baltimore County, and Baltimore City. Her amendment failed by a vote of 18-29.

=== National politics ===
In July 2024, following the attempted assassination of Donald Trump in Pennsylvania, Carozza organized an interfaith prayer service to promote unity.

=== Redistricting ===
In June 2021, Carozza urged members of the Maryland Citizens Redistricting Commission to adopt single-member legislative districts and to keep the Eastern Shore whole in the redistricting process. She opposed the congressional map introduced by the Maryland Legislative Redistricting Committee during the 2021 special legislative session. In January 2026, Carozza said she opposed mid-decade redistricting and thanked Senate President Bill Ferguson for taking a position against mid-decade redistricting in Maryland. She opposed the congressional redistricting plan proposed by the Governor's Redistricting Advisory Commission, which would redraw Maryland's 1st congressional district to improve the Democratic Party's chances of winning it, saying that the map "would eliminate a voice in the Congressional Delegation for the Eastern Shore".

=== Social issues ===
In March 2015, during a debate on legislation that would establish that smoking marijuana in a public place as a civil offense, Carozza introduced an amendment that would make it a misdemeanor to smoke marijuana in certain public places, including the beach and boardwalk in Ocean City, Maryland. The House of Delegates approved the amendment and the bill passed the legislation with the amendment in place by a vote of 90-48, but Governor Hogan vetoed the bill in May 2015.

During the 2023 legislative session, Carozza opposed a bill creating a statewide ballot referendum on enshrining the right to reproductive freedom into the Constitution of Maryland. In 2024, she introduced an amendment to the state budget that would strip all state Medicare funding for abortions except in the case of rape, incest, or life of the mother, which was rejected in a party-line 12–34 vote.

During the 2025 legislative session, Carozza introduced a bill that would prohibit transgender athletes from participating in women's sports. She reintroduced the bill in 2026.

== Personal life ==
Carozza is a catechist and Eucharistic minister at the St. Mary Star of the Sea Catholic Church.

In April 2025, Carozza pleaded guilty to a charge of driving while on the phone.

== Electoral history ==
Maryland House of Delegates District 38C Republican primary election, 2014
Party	Candidate	Votes	%
Republican	Mary Beth Carozza	2,803	100.0

Maryland House of Delegates District 38C election, 2014
Party	Candidate	Votes	%
Republican	Mary Beth Carozza	11,611	73.9
Democratic	Judy H. Davis	4,100	26.1
Write-in		3	0.0

Maryland Senate District 38 Republican primary election, 2018
Party	Candidate	Votes	%
Republican	Mary Beth Carozza	8,095	100.0

Maryland Senate District 38 election, 2018
Party	Candidate	Votes	%
Republican	Mary Beth Carozza	25,731	52.6
Democratic	James N. Mathias Jr. (incumbent)	23,098	47.3
Write-in		44	0.1

Maryland Senate District 38 election, 2022
Party	Candidate	Votes	%
Republican	Mary Beth Carozza (incumbent)	32,277	66.4
Democratic	Michele Gregory	16,273	33.5
Write-in		45	0.1
