= Norman Conway =

American politician

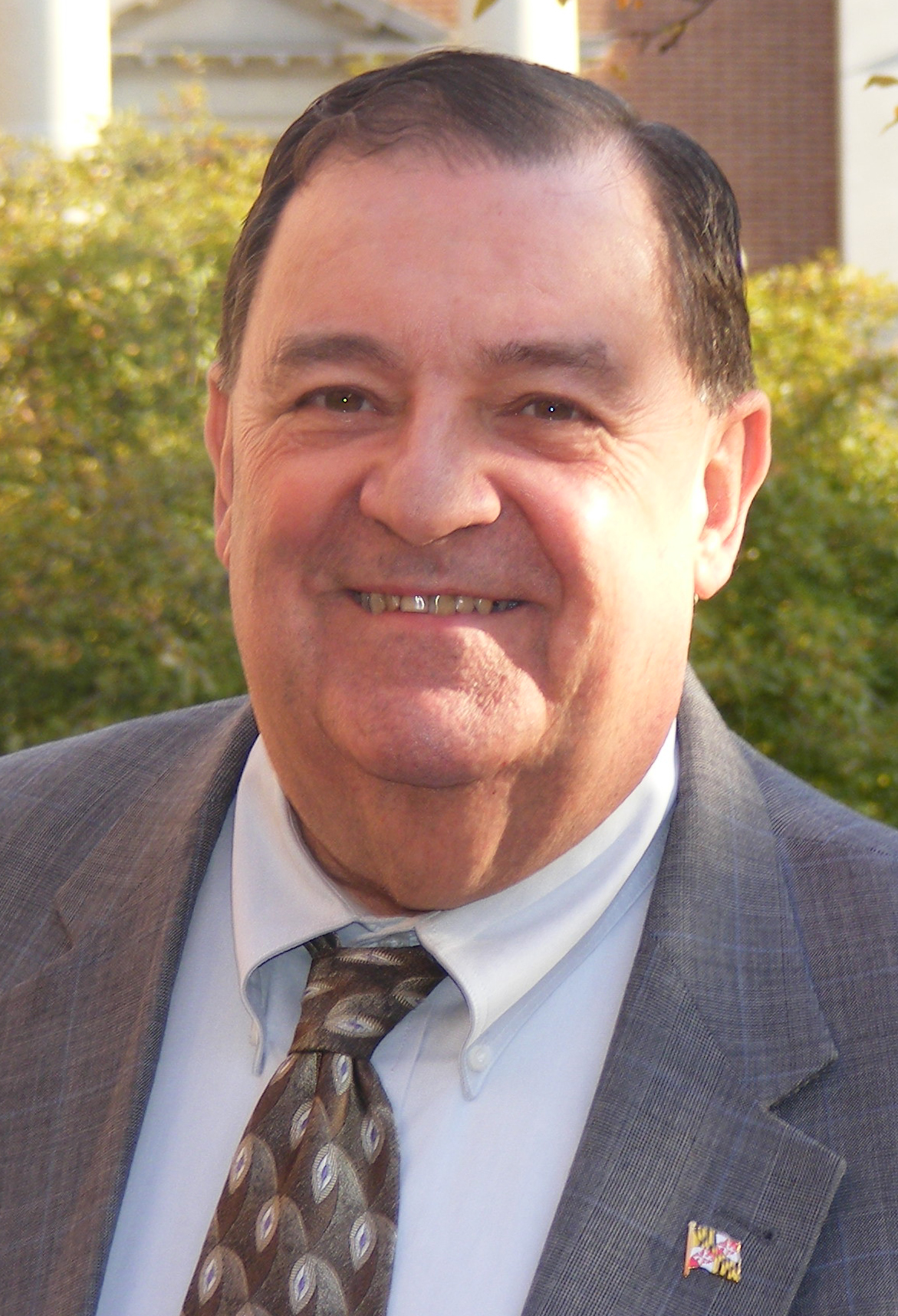

Member of the Maryland House of Delegates from District 38B
- In office January 14, 1987 – January 13, 2015
- Succeeded by: Carl Anderton Jr.
- Constituency: Wicomico and Worcester counties

Personal details
- Born: January 11, 1942 (age 84) Salisbury, Maryland, US
- Party: Democratic
- Spouse: Jan Conway
- Occupation: Educator

Norman Conway (born January 11, 1942) is an American politician who formally represented district 38B in the Maryland House of Delegates. He was chairman of the House Appropriations committee and had been in the Maryland General Assembly since 1987.

== Background ==
Born in Salisbury, Maryland, January 11, 1942, Delegate Conway graduated from Salisbury State College (now Salisbury University) in 1965 with a B.S. in education. He became an elementary school teacher at Pinehurst School in Salisbury. While teaching he continued his education, earning a Master's degree in education administration. He was promoted to the position of vice-principal, then to principal at Pinehurst. While working at Pinehurst Conway ran for political office, winning a seat on the Salisbury City Council in 1974. He was later elected the council's president by its members and served in this position from 1982 to 1987.

== In the Legislature ==
Conway was vice-chairman of the Appropriations committee when his chairman and mentor, Howard "Pete" Rawlings died and Speaker Michael E. Busch named Conway chairman of the House's most powerful committee. As Appropriations chairman, he oversees the state's 30 billion dollar budget and is also a member of the Spending Affordability Committee, the Rules and Executive Nominations Committee, and the Legislative Policy Committee. Prior to joining the Appropriations committee in 1991 he was a member of the House Ways and Means Committee.

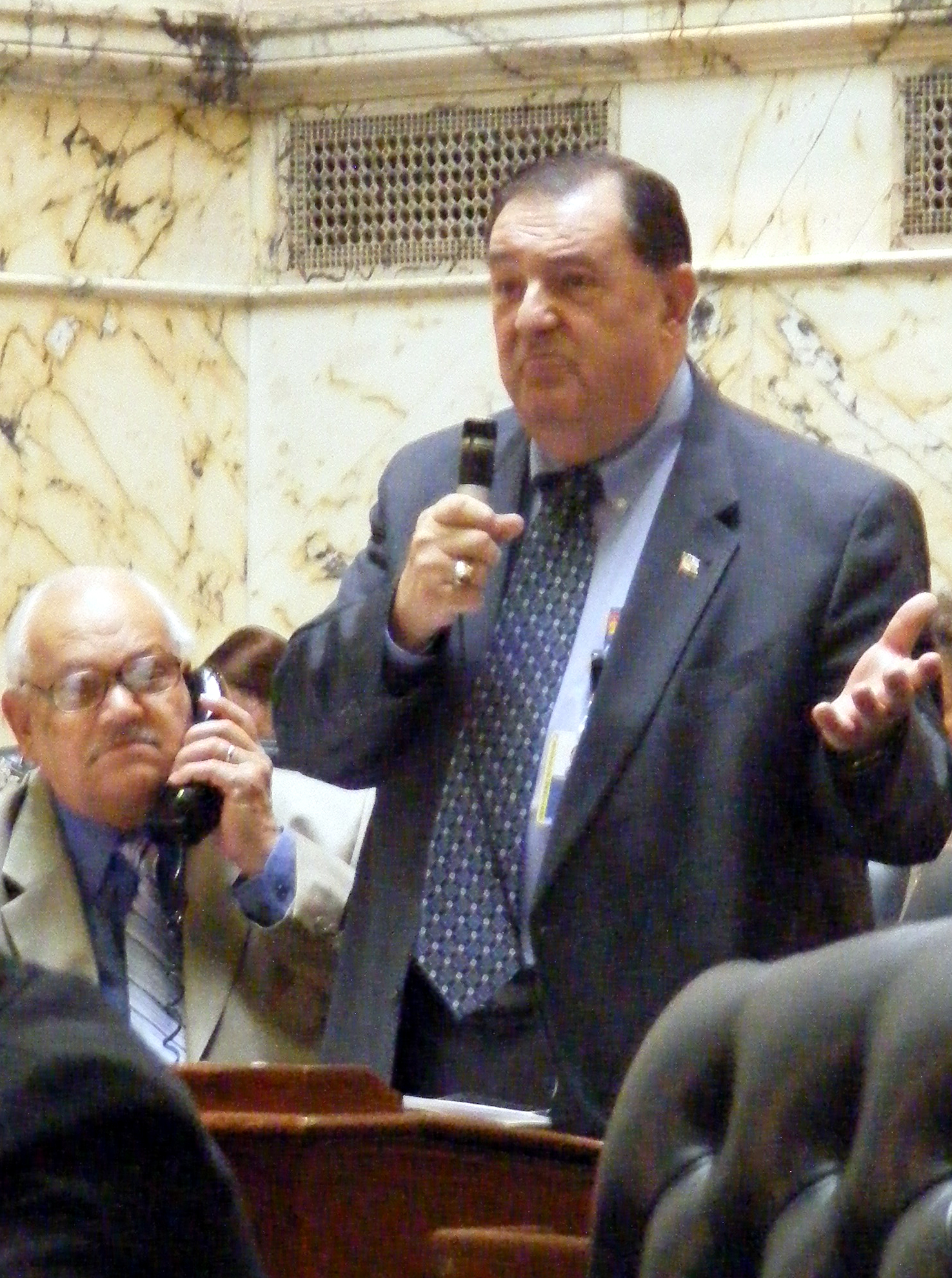
Conway fielding questions on the House floor during the 2007 extraordinary session of the Maryland General Assembly

=== Legislative notes ===
- voted for income tax reduction in 1998 (SB750)
- voted for electric deregulation in 1999 (HB703)
- voted for slots in 2005 (HB1361)
- voted for the Healthy Air Act in 2006 (SB154)
- voted in favor of increasing the sales tax by 20% - Tax Reform Act of 2007 (HB2)
- voted for the Clean Indoor Air Act of 2007 (HB359)
- voted for the Maryland Gang Prosecution Act of 2007 (HB713), subjecting gang members to up to 20 years in prison and/or a fine of up to $100,000
- voted for Jessica's Law (HB 930), eliminating parole for the most violent child sexual predators and creating a mandatory minimum sentence of 25 years in state prison, 2007
- voted for Public Safety – Statewide DNA Database System – Crimes of Violence and Burglary – Post conviction (HB 370), helping to give police officers and prosecutors greater resources to solve crimes and eliminating a backlog of 24,000 unanalyzed DNA samples, leading to 192 arrests, 2008
- voted for Vehicle Laws – Repeated Drunk and Drugged Driving Offenses – Suspension of License (HB 293), strengthening Maryland's drunk driving laws by imposing a mandatory one year license suspension for a person convicted of drunk driving more than once in five years, 2009
- voted for HB 102, creating the House Emergency Medical Services System Workgroup, leading to Maryland's budgeting of $52 million to fund three new Medevac helicopters to replace the State's aging fleet, 2009

For the past four years, Delegate Conway has annually voted to support classroom teachers, public schools, police and hospitals in Wicomico and Worcester Counties. Since 2002, funding to schools across the State has increased 82%, resulting in Maryland being ranked top in the nation for K-12 education.

== Awards ==
- 2010- Most Influential Maryland Legislators (Top 20)

== Election results ==
=== 2010 general election results district 38B ===
Voters to choose two:

Name	Votes	Percent	Outcome
Norman Conway, Dem.	16,248	29.11	Won
Mike McDermott, Rep.	15,297	27.4%	Won
Marty Pusey, Rep.	13,794	24.71%	Lost
Gee Williams, Dem.	10,459	18.74	Lost

=== 2006 general election results district 38B ===
Voters to choose two:

Name	Votes	Percent	Outcome
James N. Mathias, Jr Dem.	15,082	26.6%	Won
Norman Conway, Dem.	14,223	25.1%	Won
Michael J. James, Rep.	13,969	24.6%	Lost
Bonnie Nelson Luna, Rep.	13,469	23.7%	Lost
