= D. Page Elmore =

American politician

Douglas Page Elmore
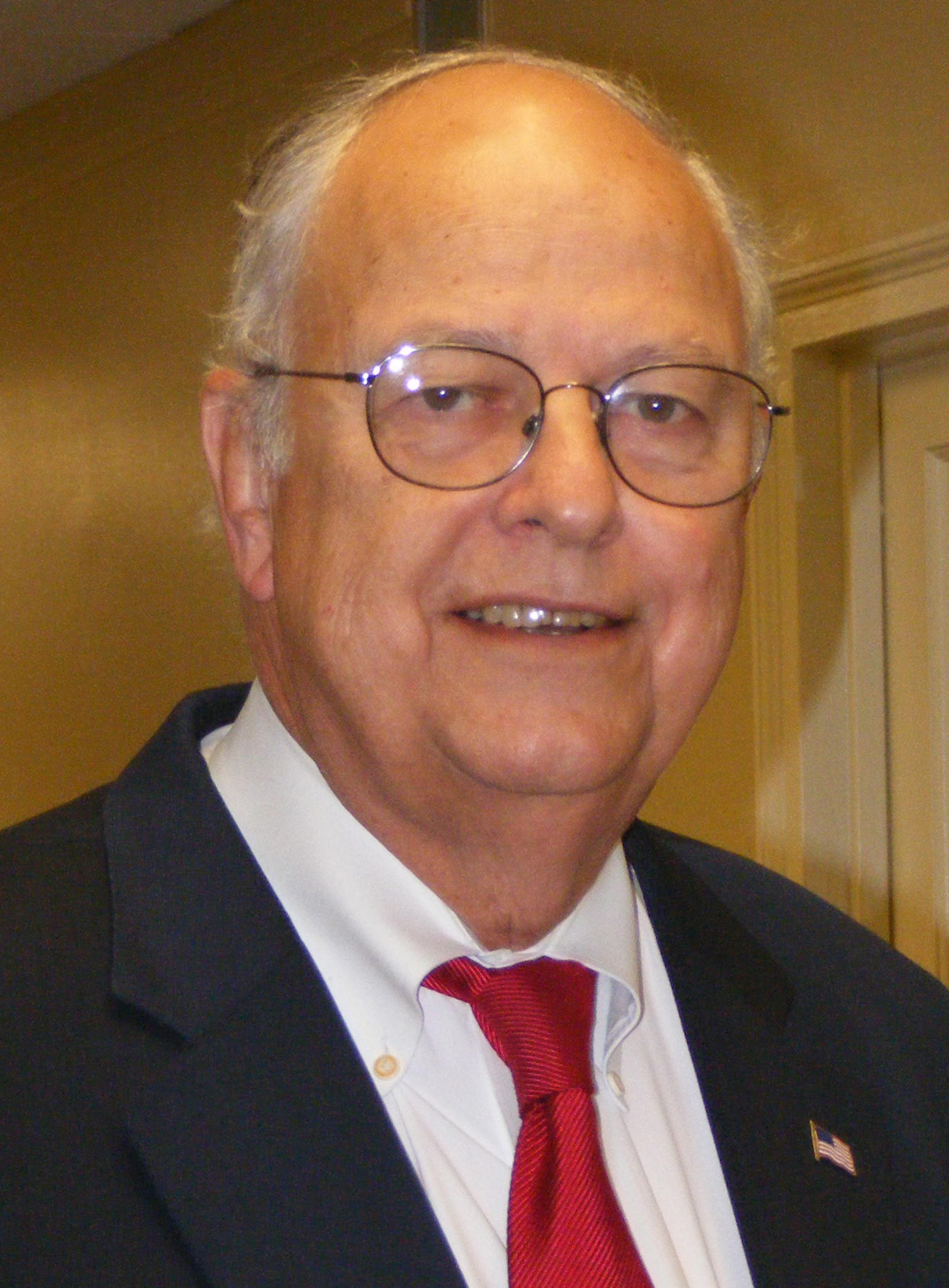

Member of the Maryland House of Delegates from the 38A district
- In office January 8, 2003 – June 26, 2010
- Preceded by: Charles A. McClenahan
- Succeeded by: Carolyn J. Elmore
- Constituency: Somerset and Wicomico Counties

Personal details
- Born: May 31, 1939 Nassawadox, Virginia
- Died: June 26, 2010 (aged 71) Salisbury, Maryland, U.S.
- Party: Republican
- Spouse: Carolyn
- Occupation: Politician, businessman

D. Page Elmore (May 31, 1939 – June 26, 2010) was a member of the Maryland House of Delegates from January 2003 until his death, representing district 38A which encompasses Somerset and Wicomico Counties. Elmore was also the chairman of the Eastern Shore Delegation.

== Background ==
Born in 1939 in Nassawadox, Virginia, Elmore attended the University of Richmond. He was a retired businessman who was the owner and chief executive officer of Shore Disposal, Inc. of Maryland's Eastern Shore from 1965 to 1998.

While living in Virginia, Elmore served was the Accomack County treasurer from 1968 until 1976.

== In the legislature ==
Elmore had been a member of House of Delegates since January 8, 2003. He was on the House Ways and Means Committee and its revenue subcommittee. He was also the 2005 chair of the Maryland Rural Caucus.

== Retirement and death ==
After initially filing to run for reelection, Elmore withdrew from the race in late June 2010 while spending several days in the hospital receiving treatment for a cracked vertebra he suffered the previous winter.

Elmore died on June 26, 2010, following a brief bout of cancer.

== Election results ==
- 2006 Race for Maryland House of Delegates – District 38A

Voters to choose one:

Name	Votes	Percent	Outcome
D. Page Elmore, Rep.	8,030	63.3%	Won
Patrick M. Armstrong, Dem.	4,652	36.6%	Lost
Other Write-Ins	6	0.1%	Lost

- 2002 Race for Maryland House of Delegates – District 38A

Voters to choose one:

Name	Votes	Percent	Outcome
D. Page Elmore, Rep.	6,811	55.7%	Won
Kirk G. Simpkins, Dem.	5,396	42.2%	Lost
Other Write-Ins	12	0.1%	Lost
