= Washington Academy and High School =

Coordinates: 38.2085°N 75.6973°W

Location
- 10902 Old Princess Anne Road; Princess Anne, Maryland; United States

Information
- Type: Public High School
- Motto: Wisdom, Honor, and Success
- School district: Somerset County Public Schools
- NCES School ID: 240057001213
- Principal: Vestina Davis
- Grades: 8–12
- Enrollment: 616 (2023-2024)
- Colors: Maroon and Gold
- Mascot: Jaguars
- Rival: Crisfield Academy and High School
- Website: whs.somerset.k12.md.us

Washington Academy and High School (commonly abbreviated to WAHS), also once known as simply Washington High School (WHS), is a public high school in Somerset County, Maryland, United States. The school handles five grades: 8th grade is handled in the "academy" section of the school, while grades 9 through 12 are handled as high school.

The school is located on the Eastern Shore of Maryland in the town of Princess Anne in Somerset County. The school is within walking distance of the University of Maryland Eastern Shore on Maryland Route 675, and just east of US 13.

The current building was constructed in 1975 and is 129,534 square feet (12,034.1 m^{2}) is size. The school property is 32.14 acres (130,100 m^{2}).

== Students ==
Washington's graduation rate has been steadily rising over the past 12 years. In 2007, 81.7% of the class of 2007 graduated, up from 70.4% in 1996.

Washington Academy and High School is a fairly small high school. In 2006, the school was near its enrollment with 673 students and it continues annually to embed an enrolled body of 570-650 students while nearing the maximum capacity for facilitation of the building.

Student population
2007	649
2006	673
2005	655
2004	502
2003	478
2002	487
2001	486
2000	515
1999	533
1998	550
1997	561
1996	606
1995	599
1994	608
1993	591

== Sports ==
Washington High School competes under a publicly chartered organization of sports, known as the Maryland Public Secondary Schools Athletic Association, while partially competing within Maryland's Special Olympics. Within recent times as the school begins clubs for potential sports offerings in the future, they reside in the 1A Division for competing schools in the lowest 25th percentile for student enrollment in grades 9th through 11th.

Currently Offered Sports

- Baseball
- Basketball
- Bocce UNIFIED SPORT
- Cross Country
- Field Hockey
- Football
- Indoor Track & Field
- Outdoor Track & Field
- Soccer
- Softball
- Strength & Conditioning UNIFIED SPORT
- Tennis

State Champions

- 2000 - Girls' Field Hockey
- 1999 - Girls' Field Hockey
- 1985 - Softball
- 1982 - Baseball
- 1975 - Boys' Basketball
- 1959 - Boys' Track & Field
- 1958 - Boys' Track & Field
- 1955 - Boys' Track & Field
- 1954 - Boys' Track & Field
- 1953 - Boys' Track & Field

State Finalist

- 2019 - Field Hockey
- 2013 - Boys' Basketball
- 2012 - Boys' Soccer
- 1995 - Softball
- 1989 - Baseball
- 1984 - Softball
- 1975 - Baseball
- 1972 - Boys' Basketball
- 1957 - Boys' Track & Field
- 1949 - Boys' Basketball
- 1948 - Boys' Basketball

Semi-Finals

- 2011 - Boys' Soccer
- 2010 - Boys' Soccer
- 2003 - Football
- 1998 - Girls' Basketball
- 1996 - Girls' Basketball
- 1983 - Baseball
- 1980 - Baseball
