= Maryland Legislative District 38 =

American legislative district

Maryland's legislative district 38
- Represents; Somerset County, Worcester County and part of Wicomico County
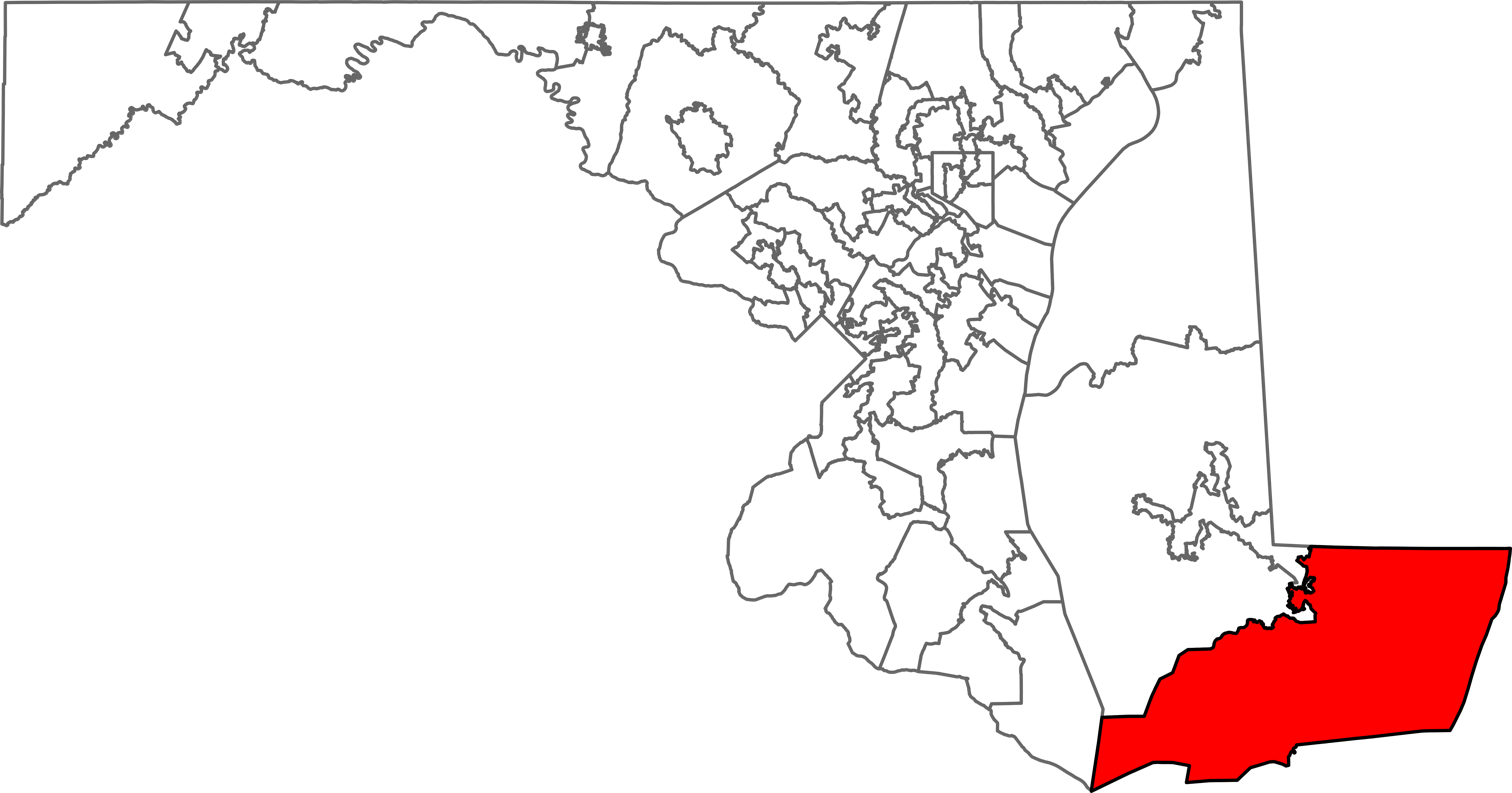
- Senator: Mary Beth Carozza (R)
- Delegate(s): Kevin Anderson (R) (District 38A); Barry Beauchamp (R) (District 38B); Wayne A. Hartman (R) (District 38C)
- Registration: 42.1% Republican; 37.6% Democratic; 18.6% unaffiliated
- Demographics: 68.7% White; 20.2% Black/African American; 0.4% Native American; 2.5% Asian; 0.0% Hawaiian/Pacific Islander; 2.7% Other race; 5.5% Two or more races; 5.2% Hispanic
- Population (2020): 131,889
- Voting-age population: 107,520
- Registered voters: 87,103

Maryland Legislative District 38 is one of 47 districts in the state for the Maryland General Assembly. It covers Somerset County, Worcester County and part of Wicomico County. The district is divided into three sub-districts for the Maryland House of Delegates: District 38A, District 38B and District 38C.

== Demographic characteristics ==
As of the 2020 United States census, the district had a population of 131,889, of whom 107,520 (81.5%) were of voting age. The racial makeup of the district was 90,597 (68.7%) White, 26,691 (20.2%) African American, 472 (0.4%) Native American, 3,239 (2.5%) Asian, 32 (0.0%) Pacific Islander, 3,547 (2.7%) from some other race, and 7,303 (5.5%) from two or more races. Hispanic or Latino of any race were 6,890 (5.2%) of the population.

The district had 87,103 registered voters as of October 17, 2020, of whom 16,196 (18.6%) were registered as unaffiliated, 36,708 (42.1%) were registered as Republicans, 32,749 (37.6%) were registered as Democrats, and 879 (1.0%) were registered to other parties.

== Political representation ==
The district is represented for the 2023–2027 legislative term in the State Senate by Mary Beth Carozza (R) and in the House of Delegates by Kevin Anderson (R, District 38A), Barry Beauchamp (R, District 38B), and Wayne A. Hartman (R, District 38C).

== History ==
=== 1994 redistricting ===
On January 14, 1994, Maryland was ordered to submit a plan for a new African American majority district on the Eastern Shore following Marylanders for Fair Representation, Inc. v. Schaefer. The U.S. District Court approved a plan to alter the boundaries of former legislative districts 36, 37, and 38, beginning with the 1994 general election. Following this, Somerset County, Worcester County and part of Wicomico County were provisioned for district 38.
