= Prince George's County Sheriff's Office =

Law enforcement services in Prince George's County, Maryland in the United States

Office of the Sheriff, Prince George's County
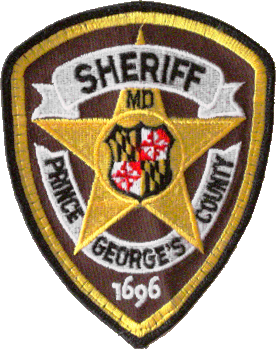
- Patch

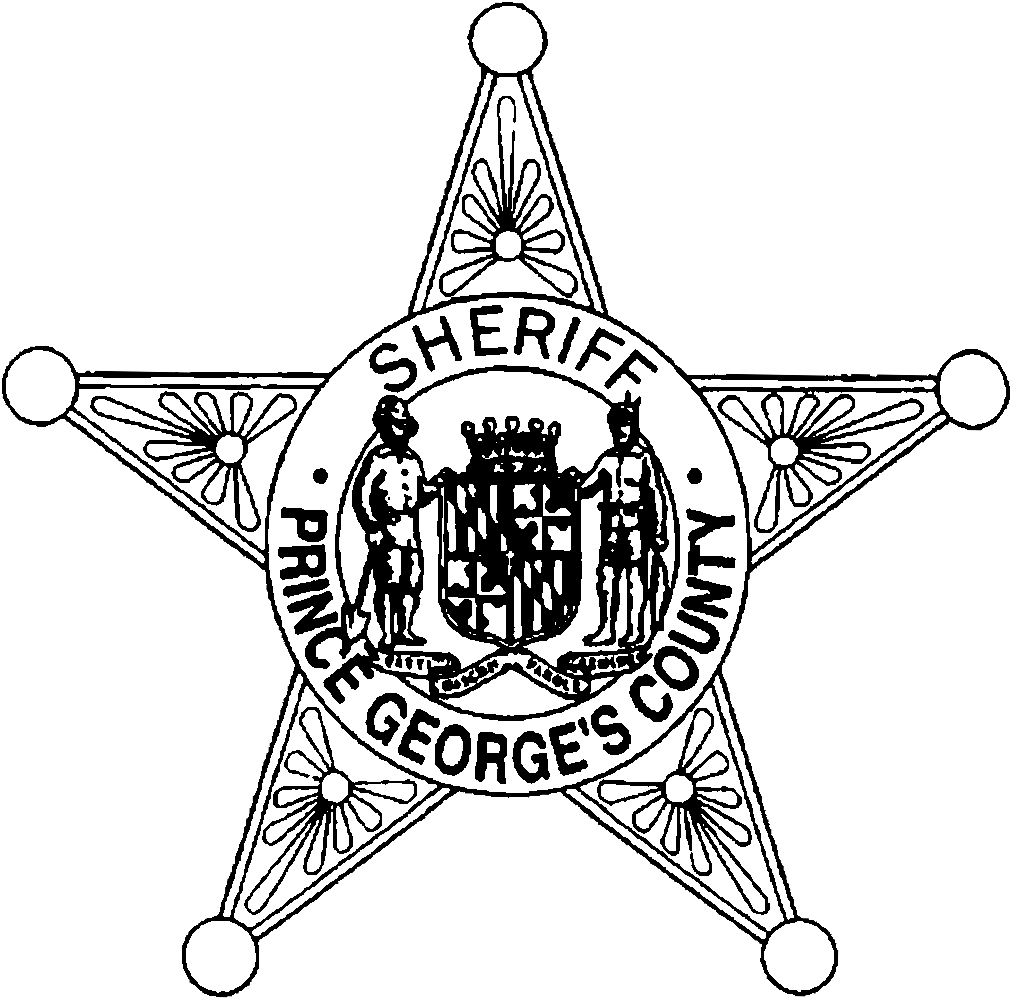
- Emblem

- Badge of a PGSO deputy

- Flag
- Common name: Prince George's County Sheriff's Office
- Abbreviation: PGSO
- Motto: "Trust, Respect, Integrity, Professionalism, Public Service!"

Agency overview
- Formed: April 1696; 330 years ago
- Employees: 386
- Annual budget: $59,957,900(as of 2025)

Jurisdictional structure
- Operations jurisdiction: Prince George's County, Maryland, U.S.
- The Prince George's County Sheriff's Office's jurisdiction
- Area: 498 square miles (1,290 km^{2})
- Population: 960,000
- Legal jurisdiction: State of Maryland (common law)
- General nature: Local civilian police

Operational structure
- Headquarters: 5303 Chrysler Way, Upper Marlboro, Maryland, U.S., 20772; 38.814797°N 76.740523°W
- Sworn members: 264
- Agency executives: John D.B. Carr, Sheriff; Randall Cooper, Chief Assistant Sheriff

Facilities
- Patrol cars: Ford Police Interceptor Sedan, Chevrolet Impala, Ford Crown Victoria Police Interceptor
- SUVs: Ford Explorer Interceptor Utility,
- Transports: Freightliner FS-65

Website
- Prince George's County Sheriff's Office

The Prince George's County Sheriff's Office (PGSO), officially the Office of the Sheriff, Prince George's County, provides law enforcement services in Prince George's County, Maryland in the United States. Its headquarters are located in Upper Marlboro, near the Depot Pond. The sheriff is the chief law enforcement officer of Prince George's County and is elected every four years. There are no term limits for the sheriff.

Created in 1696, the traditional duties of the sheriff are keeper of the public peace and the enforcement arm of the county court, analogous to the U.S. Marshals Service. The PGSO has a relatively long history compared to other police departments and sheriff's offices in Maryland. The PGSO was involved with events that occurred during the burning of Washington and affected the writing of "The Star-Spangled Banner". Prior to the creation of the Prince George's County Police Department in 1931, the PGSO was the sole county-level law enforcement agency.

Today, the duties of the sheriff include law enforcement services of the two county courthouses and surrounding property, service of court-ordered warrants, writs, protective orders, and other injunctions, and limited patrol responsibility with the County Police. The Domestic Violence Unit has expanded its role in the county to include responding to calls for service that are domestic-related. The creation of the School Resource Deputy division has placed a deputy sheriff at all of the local high schools, replacing the County Police. All other law enforcement services of the county are provided by multiple agencies but mostly left to the separate Prince George's County Police Department (PGPD), though some responsibilities are shared by both agencies. The PGSO is an agency with an array of services, from the Specialized Services Team (dealing with high-risk arrest warrants and barricaded situations) to community services aiding the county's residents in safety education.

The PGSO was accredited for the first time by the Commission on Accreditation for Law Enforcement Agencies, Inc. (CALEA) in 2018 and re-accredited in 2022.

== Authority ==
The sheriff is the chief law enforcement official of Prince George's County, per Maryland common law. All deputy sheriffs are certified, sworn law enforcement officials with full power of arrest. All sworn members of the sheriff's office are agents of the U.S. state of Maryland and thus have authority throughout the entire state, although direct jurisdiction is limited to the Seventh Judicial Circuit of Maryland, which includes Calvert County, Charles County, Prince George's County, and St. Mary's County.

== History ==
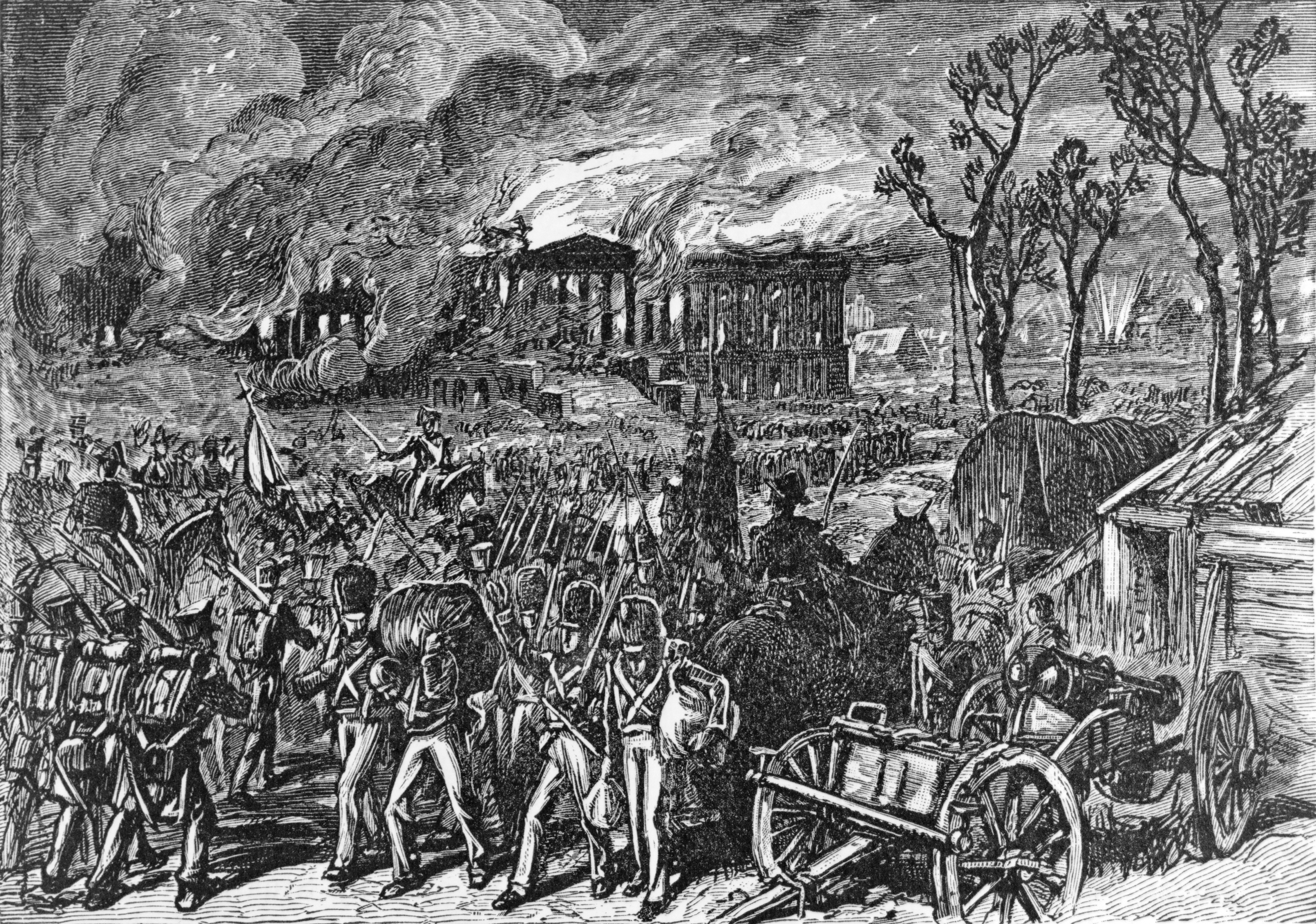
British soldiers on their way back into Prince George's County after razing Washington, D.C.

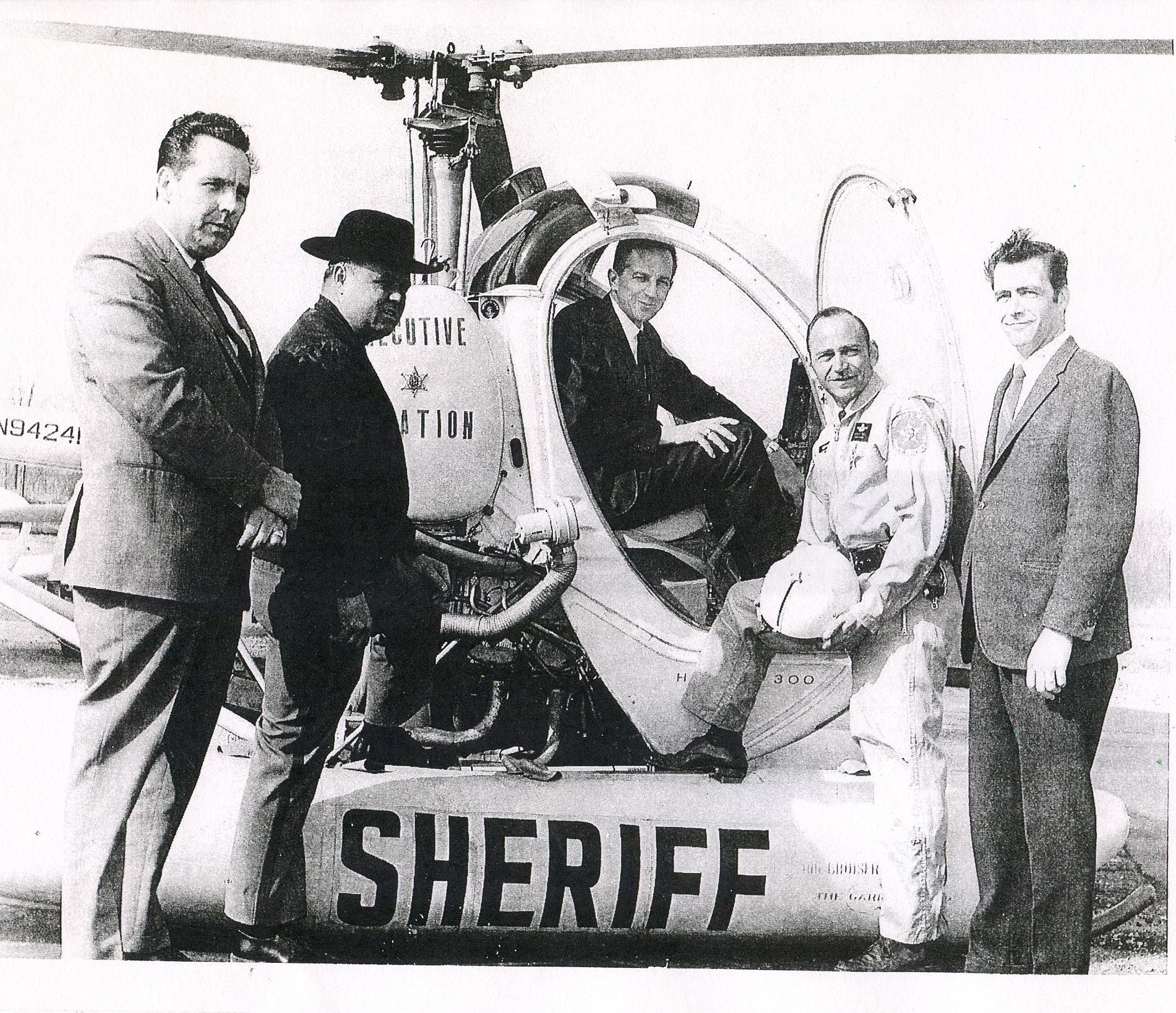
Vintage PGSO helicopter

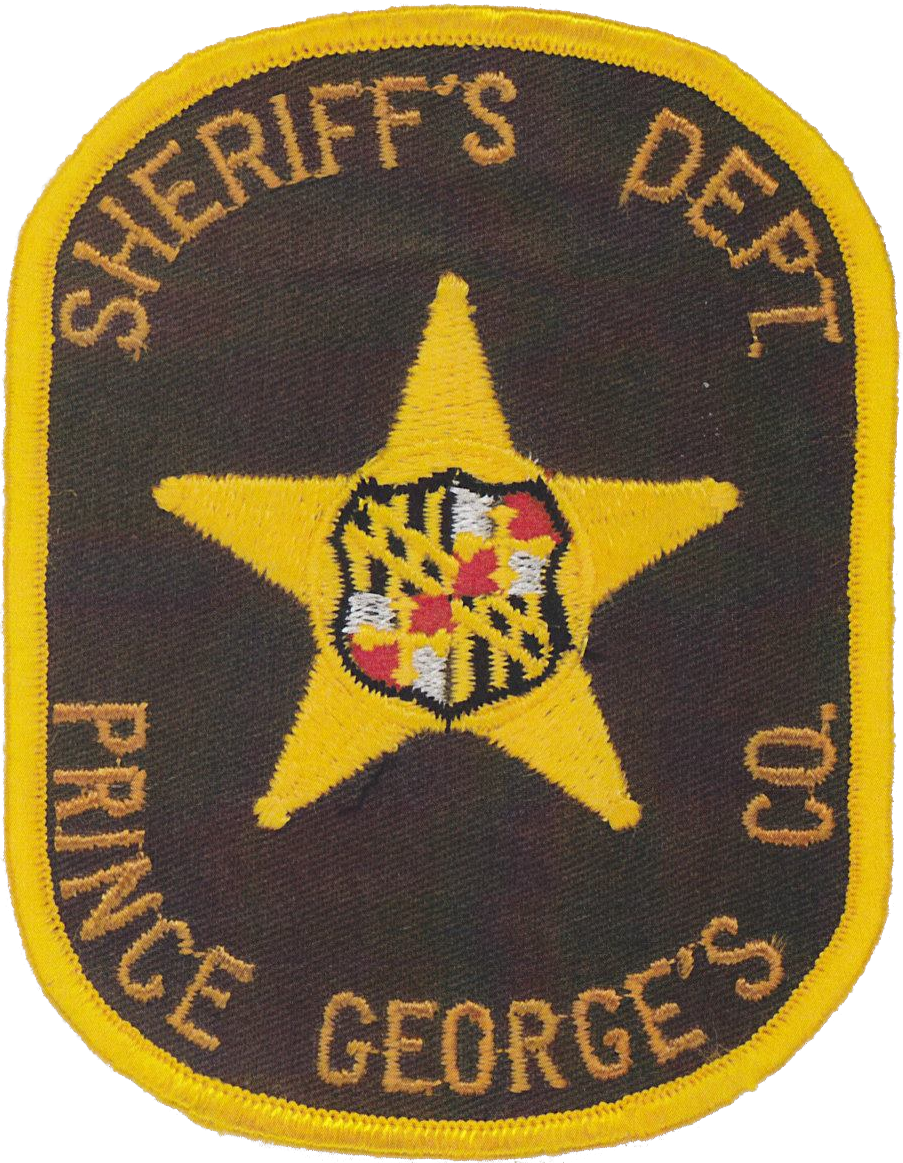
Vintage PGSO patch

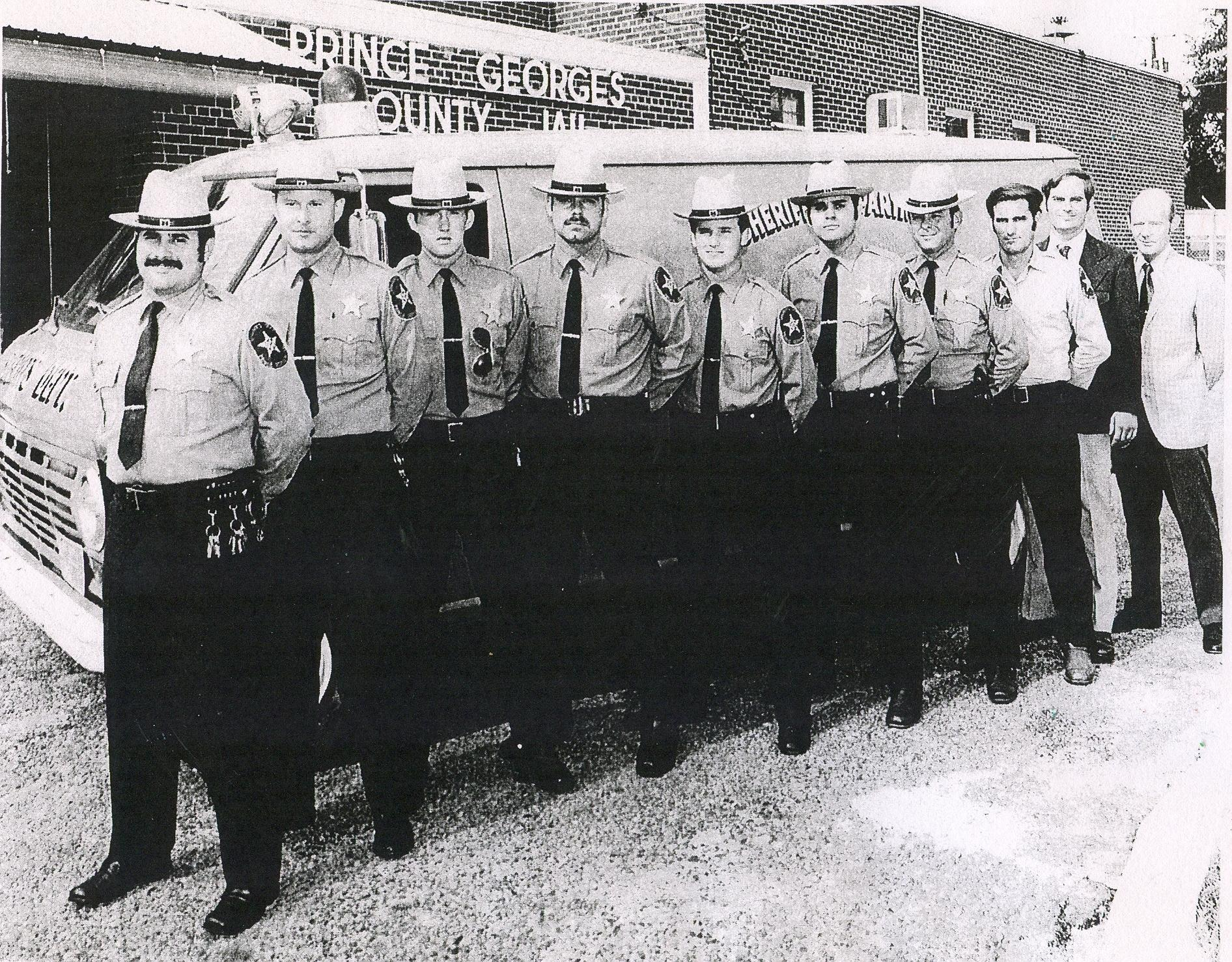
Vintage PGSO van

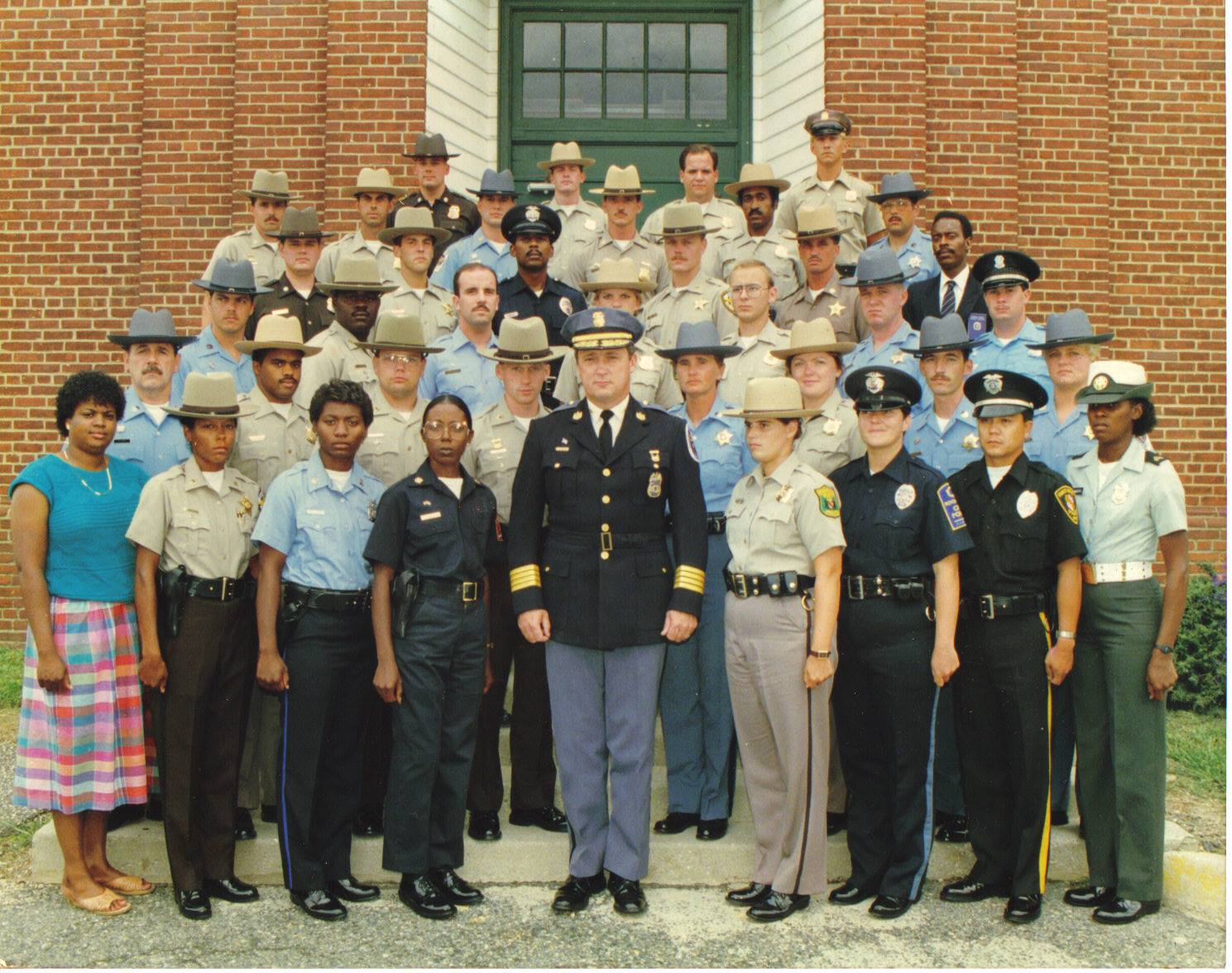
PGSO deputies in 1986

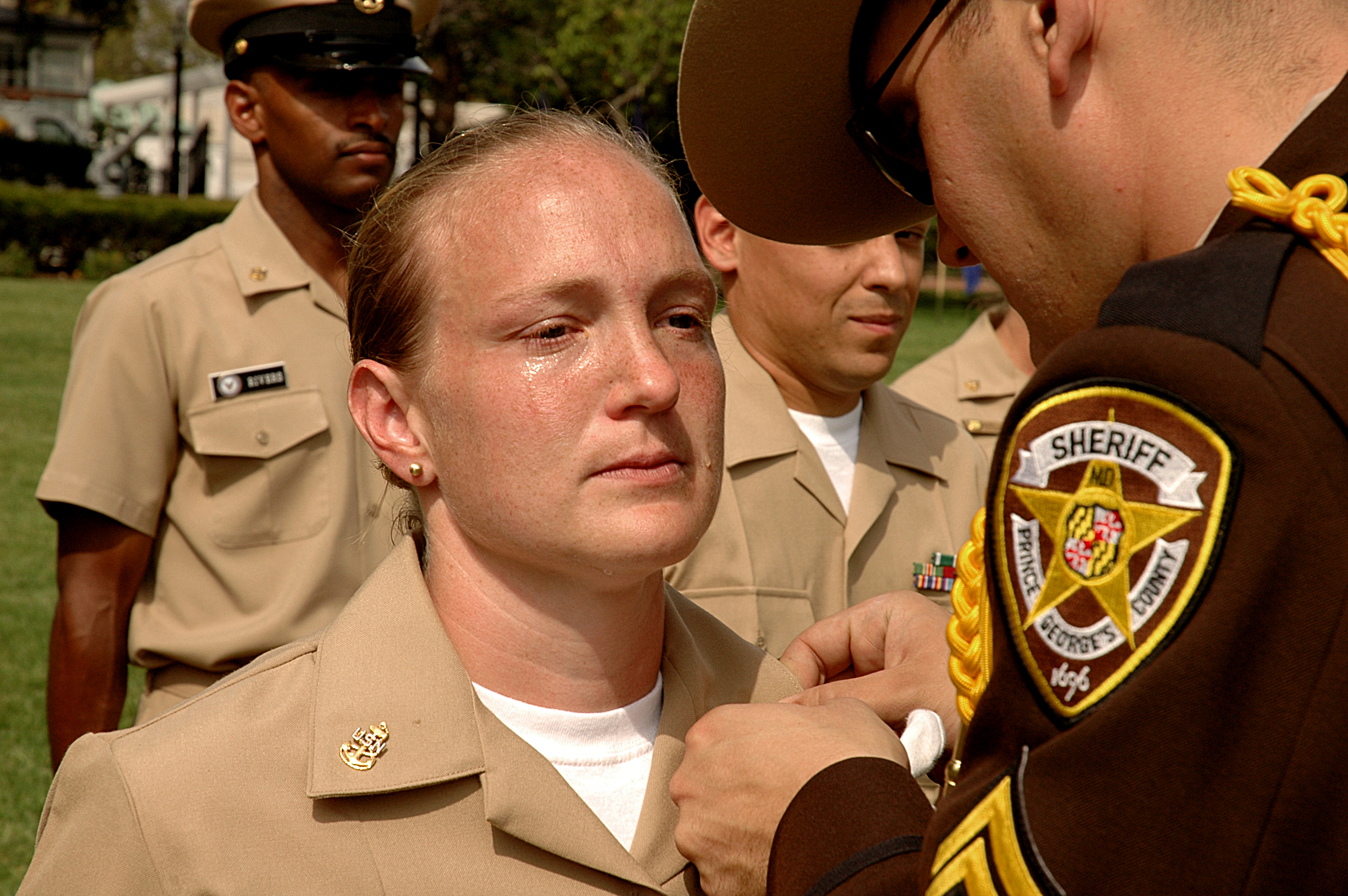
A PGSO corporal in service dress "A" uniform pins a collar device onto a U.S. Navy chief petty officer's uniform in September 2008.

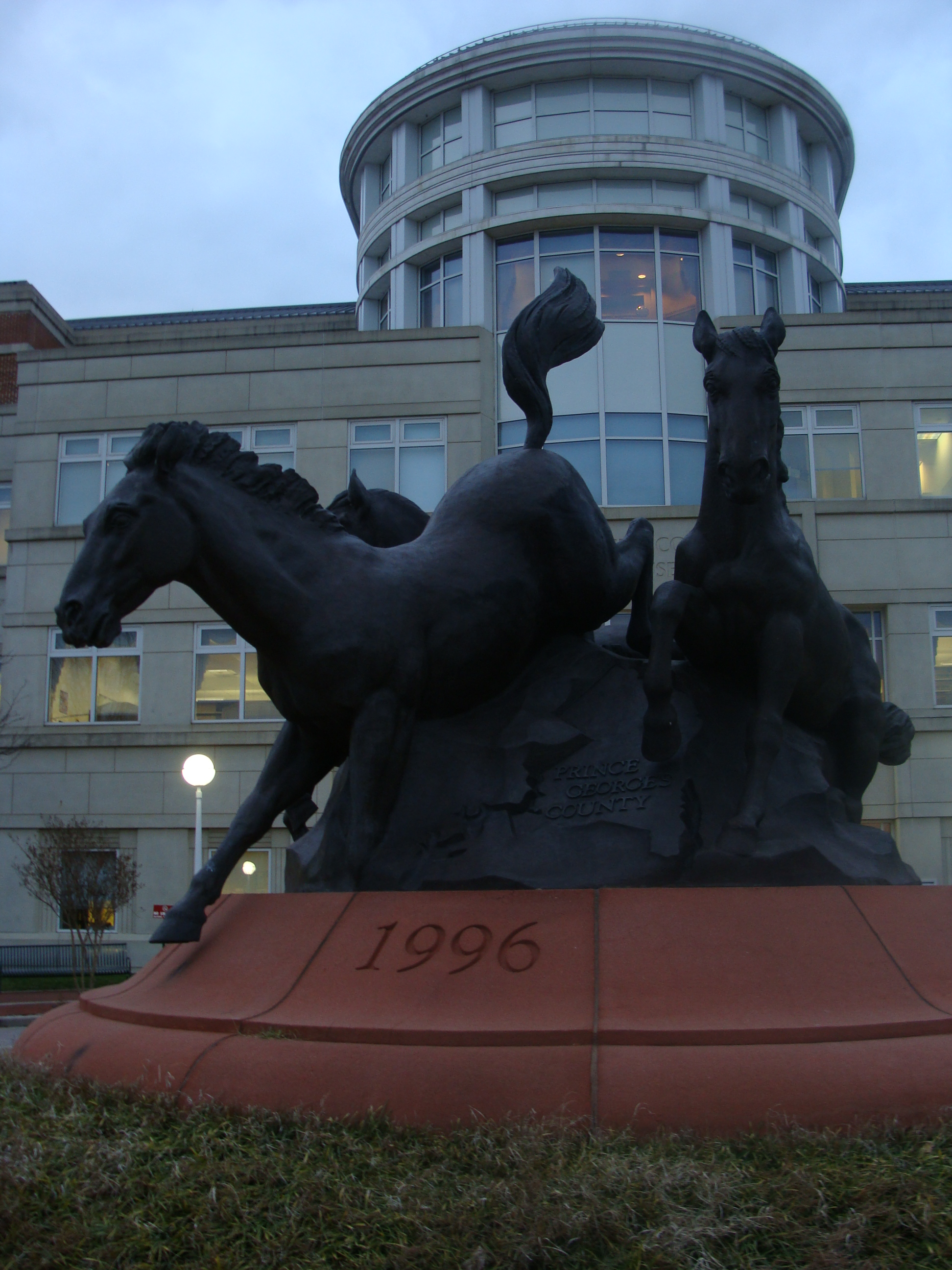
The Prince George's County courthouse in December 2008.

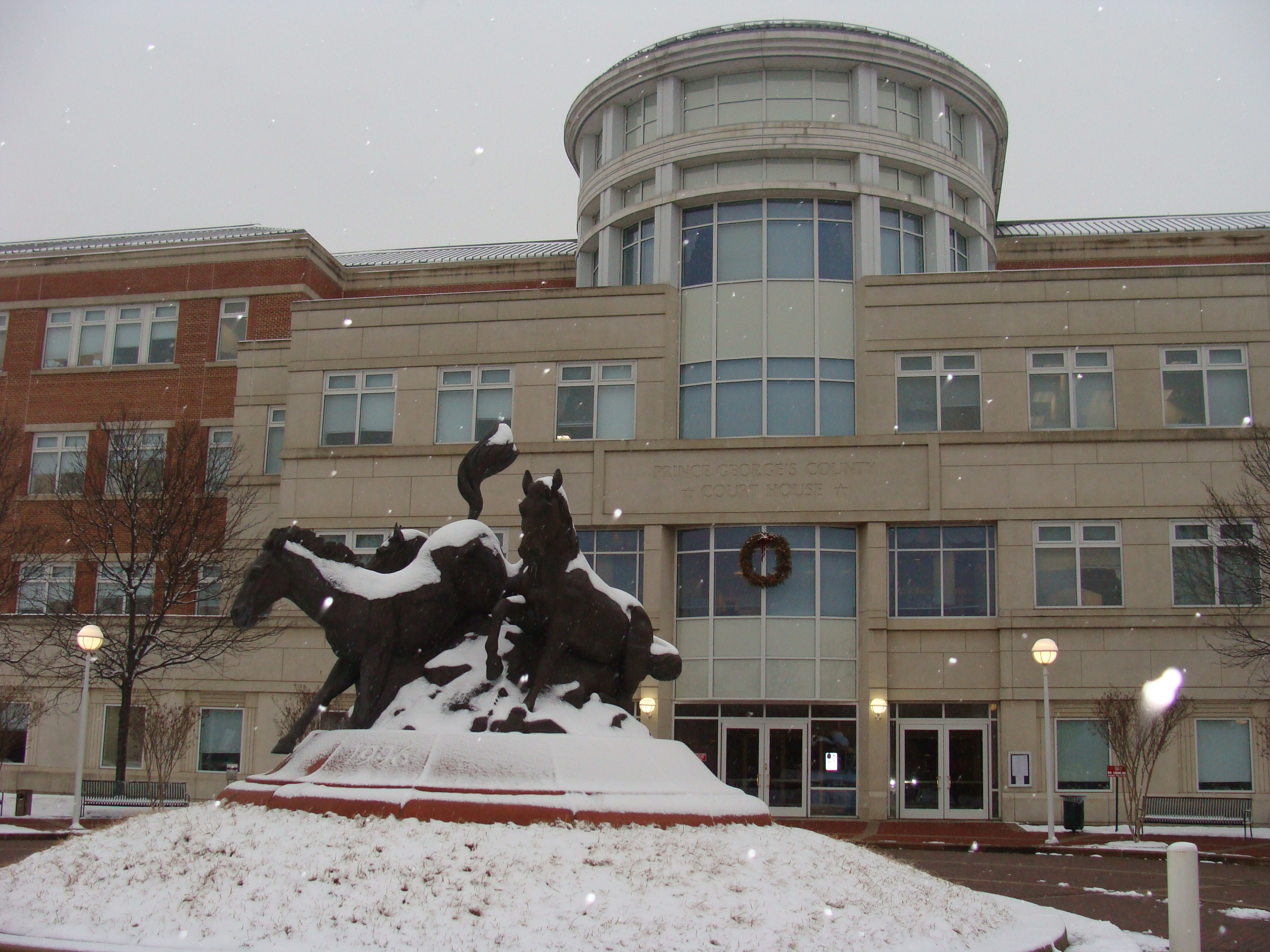
The Prince George's County courthouse in January 2009.

=== 1690s–1720s: Founding and British rule ===
The Sheriff's Office was founded April 22, 1696, when Maryland was a colony of England. The governor of Maryland, Sir Francis Nicholson, appointed Thomas Hillary as the first sheriff. The St. Paul's Church in Charlestown held the headquarters for the Sheriff's Office until the 1720s when it was relocated to the town of Upper Marlboro. At the time of the 18th century, there was no set salary for the sheriff, but he was often paid in tobacco. From 1696 to 1776, the sheriff was appointed by the colonial governor to a one-year term. In 1776, the Maryland constitution changed this so that the sheriff was elected by the voters to three-year terms.

=== 1810s: War of 1812 ===
During the War of 1812, which lasted from 1812 to 1815, an incident occurred at the time of the burning of Washington, D.C., when the sheriff's office became involved in an occurrence that led to the writing of the U.S. national anthem. As the British Army marched from Washington they passed through Prince George's County. Because the residents had cooperated with the British, the commander ensured that minimal damage was inflicted upon the local residents and their property. After the Battle of Bladensburg, the British Army returned to the area of Upper Marlboro. However, this time some of the British soldiers looted local farms. A sheriff's posse subsequently arrested the offending soldiers and placed them in the county jail. Upon learning about the arrest of his soldiers, the British commander ordered the arrest of the sheriff and the posse in turn. One of the posse members was Dr. William Beam. Beam was ultimately arrested and held for ransom on a British warship. Beam's brother-in-law, Francis Scott Key, went to Baltimore Harbor in search of him. He witnessed the British fleet under attack which was the inspiration of "The Star-Spangled Banner".

During the war, an incident occurred involving the Prince George's County jail, when local resident Dr. William Beanes, (1775–1824) captured several marauding British Army deserters from the passing army of General Robert Ross (1766–1814) and Vice Admiral, Sir George Cockburn, (1772–1853), and held them in the County Jail, after he had treated several wounded "Redcoat" soldiers in their march on to Washington and the disastrous Battle of Bladensburg on the Eastern Branch stream of the Anacostia River in August 1814. Later he was arrested along with several others including Robert Bowie, former 11th governor of Maryland (1803–06, 1811–12) by retreating British cavalry on orders from Ross who had stayed in his home as headquarters. Later Francis Scott Key (1779–1843), a Georgetown and Frederick lawyer with Col. John S. Skinner, U.S. Prisoner-of-War and Parole Agent went to Baltimore secured a small sailing ship, the Minden, and sailed down the Patapsco River and the Chesapeake Bay to find the British Royal Navy fleet after leaving the Patuxent River, beating up the Bay from their base on Tangier Island, Virginia heading for their attack on the hated "nest of pirates" - Baltimore. After being received and negotiating with General Ross, Admiral Cockburn and their superior, Admiral Sir Alexander Cochrane, (1758–1832), and showing him some letters written by captured British wounded soldiers testifying to the fair treatment Beanes had given them and tended to them, they agreed to free him but that would be held up until they could celebrate after the Burning of Baltimore following their attack on Fort McHenry and landing troops to the east at North Point. Well, the famous story has been told, how the general was killed prior to the skirmishing at the Battle of North Point on September 12, how the advancing British under successor, Colonel Arthur Brooke led the British regiments to face the 20,000 drafted and volunteer citizens and militia under the command of Major General Samuel Smith, (1752–1839), of the Maryland Militia on the eastern heights of "Loudenschlager's Hill" (later known as "Hampstead Hill" in modern Patterson Park, between Highlandtown and Canton neighborhoods) whose dug-in fortifications and dragged cannon were so numerous that the "Redcoats" halted in their tracks and decided to await the shelling of the fort which guarded the entrances to the Harbor to pass into the inner port and the waterfront of Fells Point. Following the failure of the fort to fall to two days of "the rockets' red glare and the bombs bursting in air" and their flanking troop-loaded barge attack around the west end but driven back by alert artillery seamen at Forts Covington and Babcock in a driving night rainstorm, the British fleet turned about and set sail. Key and his companions Beanes and Skinner who were startled, amazed and emotionally overcome to see a huge 30 by 42 foot banner being raised in the light of the early morning with the distant booming of the morning's gun salute, knew that the fort and the city had held. When they landed at "The Basin" (modern "Inner Harbor") and Key finished up his draft of a new poem "The Defence of Fort McHenry" at the Indian Queen Hotel at West Baltimore and Hanover Streets, (later to be set to music in a few days) and sung lustily through the city, performed on the stage at the famed Holliday Street Theatre, and then soon throughout the state and soon the nation as "The Star Spangled Banner".

In 1851, the sheriff's term was changed from a three-year term to a two-year term.

=== 1922–1930: Sheriff and police split ===
In 1922, the sheriff's term length was extended from two years to four years.

From 1929 to 1930, due to an increase in population and crime, Prince George's County created a separate police department. Prior to this time, laws allowed detectives to be used on loan from the Baltimore City Police Department. The newly created police department allowed the Sheriff's Office to focus its manpower on enforcing orders of the court.

In 1963, the PGSO hired its first female deputy Annette J. Meyer, who was also the first female deputy sheriff in Maryland's history.

=== 1994–2000: Funding cuts and vacancies ===
From December 12, 1994, to January 2000, the PGSO did not hire any new deputies or civilian employees, leaving the agency with 92 vacant positions that needed to be filled. Over that period, 66 deputies left the agency, some retiring routinely, others leaving due to increased workloads caused by vacant positions. In some cases, deputies worked sixteen hours in one day, eight in courtrooms, and eight serving warrants. In December 1994, the agency had 248 deputies, whereas on January 20, 2000, it only had 192 deputies, with 20 leaving from November 1998 to January 2000. In July 1996, the county government decreased the amount of funding the PGSO was receiving. Unlike the PGPD at the time, the PGSO was not nationally accredited and did not receive accreditation until 2018. Computers were also in short supply, and the few that were in use were outdated and obsolete.

In 1996, the Southern Management Company, a firm responsible for managing residential apartments complexes, filed a lawsuit against the sheriff and the county government, with the plaintiffs alleging that they lost revenue due to the sheriff's office inability to evict tenants who were not paying their rent costs.

In 1998, Alonzo D. Black II was elected sheriff of Prince George's County. He was the first African American to be elected sheriff of Prince George's County.

In January 2000, it was revealed that the PGSO held seized money inside of a safe, ever since the previous sheriff's term, and did not report it to higher authorities. In response to the news, the county council responded that they did not object to the PGSO's actions.

In February 2000, the county government attempted to gain 57 million dollars from the state government at a courthouse in Charles County, to cover the costs of having sheriff's deputies providing security at a district court since 1971. The state countered that the county was responsible for any of the costs incurred.

In March 2000, the county executive announced 1.4 billion dollar budget for the county's government in the 2001 fiscal year, which included funding increases for the sheriff's office.

=== 2000–2002: Intra-departmental politics ===
In July 2000, the Sheriff's Office reintroduced its top most wanted list, which had been discontinued six years prior.

At the end of October 2000, the PGSO had 129 deputies. At the end of October 2001, the PGSO had 125 deputies, down from the previous year.

In January 2002, former sheriff James V. Aluisi, previously a supporter of Sheriff Black, voiced his disapproval of Black's handling of the department, stating he was not an effective communicator. He stated that Michael A. Jackson, the sheriff's office's union leader, would make a good successor in the upcoming primary elections.

In January 2002, Sheriff Black announced efforts to combat workplace violence.

In February 2002, Sheriff Black endorsed Lieutenant Governor Kathleen Kennedy Townsend for governor of Maryland in the 2002 Maryland gubernatorial election.

On August 23, 2002, dozens of members from the Deputy Sheriff's Association issued a vote of no confidence against the incumbent sheriff, Alonzo Black, during a meeting at the county's courthouse. The vote, they claimed, was issued due to allegations that the sheriff made against members of the agency, in which he said they were deliberately malingering in order to reflect badly on him. The sheriff rejected the allegations as unfounded and voiced his displeasure over the vote, calling them politically motivated due to their proximity to the primary elections, which was only weeks away at the time.

In 2002, the Sheriff's Office provided security at FedEx Field during Washington Redskins football games.

In September 2002, Michael A. Jackson defeated Black in the Democratic Primary election for sheriff. Jackson was endorsed by Albert Wynn.

By the end of October 2002, the PGSO had 124 deputies.

=== 2002: Deputies killed in the line of duty ===
Murders of James V. Arnaud and Elizabeth R. Licera Magruder
- Location of Adelphi in Prince George's County, Maryland.
- Location: 39.009086°N 76.964564°W; 9332 Lynmont Drive; Adelphi, Maryland, U.S.
- Date: Thursday, August 29, 2002; 24 years ago 9:26 p.m. – 9:39 p.m. (UTC–4)
- Target: Prince George's County sheriff's deputies
- Attack type: Murder
- Weapon: Semi-automatic 9mm-chambered handgun
- Deaths: 2
- Victims: James V. Arnaud; Elizabeth R. Licera Magruder
- Perpetrator: James R. Logan

On the evening of Thursday, August 29, 2002, two PGSO sheriff's deputies, Corporal James V. Arnaud, aged 53, and Deputy Elizabeth R. Licera Magruder, aged 30, were killed in the line of duty while trying to serve an Emergency Petition Service (EPS), a court-ordered psychological evaluation, on James Ramiah Logan, a 23-year-old part-time computer technician, drug dealer, and High Point High School graduate.

==== Background ====
At approximately 9:25 p.m. on the night of August 29, 2002, Corporal Arnaud and Deputy Magruder arrived at the residence of James Ramiah Logan, a 23-year-old man and convicted felon who lived at his parents' single-story rambler house at 9332 Lynmont Drive in Adelphi, Maryland, near the Buck Lodge Middle School. According to departmental protocol, they were to arrive at the house with a third deputy, however, none were available at the time. They were to serve a petition to have an emergency psychiatric evaluation performed on Logan. The day before, Logan's mother Karen Logan had called police to report his aggressive behavior, but as they did not witness it upon arrival, they left him alone. The following day, hours before the deputies arrived, Logan's wife, Valencia Flood, fearing for her safety and the safety of her children, filed the petition with the judicial system to have her husband receive treatment, saying that Logan was "paranoid" and that he "needs to be hospitalized immediately" as "his condition was worsening". The petition entailed the deputies taking Logan to a hospital, where he would have his psychiatric health examined by medical personnel. A few days earlier, on August 26, Logan had been examined by a psychiatrist, who diagnosed him with paranoid schizophrenia and recommended that he be admitted to a medical institution to receive treatment for his mental health. Logan adamantly asserted that he was in sound mental health and refused to consent to any such treatment and thus was not admitted to such an institution and was released.

After the deputies arrived at Logan's house at around 9:25 p.m., Logan's father, James Logan Sr., a television repairman, led them inside the residence, where Logan was in the basement conducting a Bible study with Anthony Antwan Kromah, a 19-year-old man from Hyattsville, Maryland. Earlier in the month, Logan was released from a St. Mary's County detention center after being arrested and posting a $25,000 bond. He had been arrested by a Maryland state trooper who had found cocaine, marijuana, and a .38 caliber handgun in Logan's automobile after stopping him as he was driving with Kromah and another man in St. Mary's County. Logan was charged with possession of an illegal controlled substance with the intent to distribute. Logan had also been using cocaine and smoking marijuana earlier in the day. Earlier in the day, Magruder had confided to a fellow deputy that she felt uneasy about the assignment.

After the deputies went into the basement, he was asked by Arnaud to come with him, who said to him, "You've got to come and go with me now." However, Logan adamantly refused, saying "I told you, I'm not going with you anywhere." Logan then ran up the staircase and went into his former bedroom, now used as a guest bedroom, and closed the door. Arnaud and Magruder followed him to the room and stood outside the door. Arnaud tried to convince Logan to come out of the room, as Logan's parents and Magruder, who had joined the department in February 2001, stood by, watching. After Logan's parents left the scene and went to the house's master bedroom, Logan became more belligerent and uncooperative. Magruder called for assistance over her radio at 9:34 p.m. Logan retrieved a semi-automatic 9mm-chambered handgun and fired at Arnaud while partially hidden behind a closet door, and one bullet struck him in the throat and severed his carotid artery. Logan then shot Arnaud in the chest at a distance of less than 7 feet (2.1 m) away, delivering an ultimately fatal wound. Arnaud then retreated into another room, mortally wounded.

Seeing Arnaud felled by gunfire, Magruder, who was wearing body armor, retreated towards the living room while drawing her sidearm. However, before she could return fire, Logan then fired at her six times from a distance of less than 10 feet (3.0 m), with one shot striking her in the head. Mortally wounded, she fell onto the living room floor and onto her sidearm. Logan walked over and checked on Magruder and then went over to the room where Arnaud had retreated to and while standing over him, shot him four more times, injuring his liver and inducing severe internal bleeding which would ultimately prove to be fatal. Logan's father, who was in the house's master bedroom, heard the gunshots, and erroneously thinking that the deputies had shot him, went over to the scene to see what had happened. He saw Logan leaving the house with a firearm in hand, and saw that the two deputies had been shot. Logan's father then called 9-1-1 via telephone at 9:39 p.m. to report the shooting to the authorities. The dispatcher put out a "Signal 13" call over the radio and emergency medical technicians arrived, removing Magruder from the house by stretcher. Arnaud would die from severe gunshot-induced blood loss at the scene. Still showing signs of life, Magruder was airlifted on a medical helicopter to the Prince George's Hospital Center, with CPR being applied on her while en route. However, she would be pronounced dead at the hospital before midnight.

==== Manhunt ====
After shooting Magruder and killing Arnaud, Logan then fled the scene with Kromah in a silver-painted Dodge Charger with Maryland license plates, with Kromah driving the vehicle. After leaving the house, Kromah took the weapon from Logan and attempted to wipe off any residual evidence, such as fingerprints, from it. The two then disposed of the murder weapon by burying it at a nearby forested cemetery and abandoned the getaway vehicle. Kromah was captured and charged as an accomplice to the murder; he pleaded guilty on April 24, 2003, to being an accessory after the fact to a murder. In the meantime, Logan stayed briefly at the residence of Twyla James, a woman who lived in Largo, Maryland. James would later be arrested and charged as an accessory to murder as she had transported Logan, who she had known was a murder suspect and fugitive sought by legal authorities, to her residence and allowed him to stay there. Logan was apprehended two days after the murder, on August 31, 2002, at a boiler room shed near the Quebec Arms Apartments in Hyattsville, Maryland, on the 8200 block of 14th Avenue. He was spotted there by undercover policemen, who had received information that it had been an area that Logan was known to frequent in the past. Logan was found hiding in the shed by policemen, who then used a police canine and a taser to subdue and apprehend him. The firearm believed to be used in the murders was recovered earlier as well.

After his capture, Logan was taken to the Prince George's Hospital Center, where he received stitches and sutures, being treated for canine bites on his ankle and arms. After receiving medical treatment for his injuries, Logan was taken to a police station, where he was interrogated for approximately three-and-a-half hours by Vincent "Vince" Canales, a PGPD detective, where he admitted to the murders. When asked by the detective why he had murdered the deputies, rather than fleeing without killing them, Logan said "I wanted to annihilate them, I couldn't leave them alive". The interrogation was recorded by a camera and stored onto a VHS cassette tape and DVD, the contents of which would later be used in his murder trial as evidence to assist in convicting him. Judge Frank M. Kratovil denied Logan release on bond. In November 2002, Logan's attorney, Fred Warren Bennett, claimed that Logan could not be held criminally responsible for the murders, due to mental deficiencies and poor psychiatric health. In response, a judge mandated that Logan undergo a psychiatric evaluation.

==== Trial ====
At his trial in late October 2003, Logan's attorney, Fred Warren Bennett, argued that although Logan did kill the deputies, he was not criminally responsible for the killings due to mental illness, and thus, should be acquitted by reason of insanity. However, the state's prosecution argued that any mental deficiencies Logan had were brought about by his usage of illegal narcotics, such as cocaine and marijuana, and as such, he would be legally responsible for the murders.

Ultimately, the jury did not agree with the arguments put forth by Logan's defense attorney and Logan was convicted of second-degree murder on November 10, 2003, after jurors deliberated for ten hours over the span of three days over his fate. A few weeks later, on December 12, 2003, Logan was sentenced by the trial's judge, E. Allen Shepherd, to 100 years of imprisonment, without the possibility of parole.

Before he was sentenced, Logan apologized to the relatives and comrades of his victims, and asked Shepherd to show mercy in his sentencing of him. Shepherd rebuked Logan's pleas for mercy, citing the heinous nature of the crime, which he remarked as being the most callous one that he had ever encountered as a judge. Shepherd said to Logan, "I've never experienced a case of a murder more cold-blooded than those that occurred in this case" and "You decided you were going to annihilate those two people".

==== Retrial ====
Despite his conviction, Logan's attorneys tried to appeal to the courts, with the one-hundred year prison sentence being unanimously upheld by a three-judge judicial panel on June 15, 2004. However, in their decision, the panel granted him the possibility of paroled release after fifty years. However, more than a year later, on September 7, 2005, the conviction was overturned by the Maryland Court of Special Appeals (CSA) and Logan was awarded a second trial. The CSA determined that the investigators had acted with impropriety in the lead detective's methodology of obtaining of Logan's confession to the murders, saying that he violated Logan's Miranda rights by deliberately misleading him in order to obtain a confession. The CSA also determined that the judiciary's selection process of jurors for the trial had not been rigorous enough, thus disadvantaging the defendant.

Logan's retrial began in June 2007, with the prosecution unable to use Logan's confession to present its case for conviction, for the judiciary had ruled that it had been obtained with impropriety. In the retrial, the prosecution used the same argument it had used in the original trial back in 2003, arguing that Logan's insanity defense was illegitimate due to his usage of illegal controlled substances. The state's prosecution argued that Logan himself was solely responsible for any deficiencies in his mental health, saying that they were brought about through his consumption of illegal narcotics, such as cocaine and marijuana, the two illegal controlled substances which he had used on the day of the murders. Ultimately, the first attempt at a retrial ended in June 2007 with a mistrial after jurors could not come to a verdict after ten hours of deliberations. On July 1, 2007, Logan's attorney died after being involved in an automobile collision on Route 10 in Glen Burnie, further complicating matters. However, a few months later, Logan was subsequently convicted again after pleading guilty and sentenced to thirty years of imprisonment on October 24, 2007, with credit for the five years he had already served, much to the disappointment of the victims' surviving family members, who felt he deserved a lifelong imprisonment for his crime.

==== Legacy ====
The murders occurred eleven days before the Maryland Democratic Party's primary election to determine its candidate for the office of Prince George's County sheriff. As there were no candidates running for sheriff in any other parties, the winner of the primary election would automatically run unopposed in the general election itself. The incumbent sheriff, Alonzo Black, lost nomination and reelection to the union president, Michael A. Jackson, who went on to be elected sheriff, with the endorsement of Albert Wynn. Jackson vowed to implement new measures to prevent a similar incident from occurring in the future.

Arnaud was posthumously promoted to sergeant, and Magruder was posthumously promoted to deputy first class. At the time of his death Arnaud was married to his wife, Theresa, and had several children. At the time of her death, Magruder was married to her husband Derwinn and had a three-year-old son named Devinn. In September 2002, Arnaud and Magruder were posthumously honored before the U.S. House of Representatives by U.S. representative Steny H. Hoyer of Maryland's 5th congressional district, thus entering their names into the Congressional Record.

The killings helped to spur the passage of a new Maryland state law pertaining to the treatment of the mentally ill, which went into effect on October 1, 2003. The law's creation and passage were spurred in part by testimony from Logan's parents, James Logan Sr. and Karen Logan. The law allows a judge to order a mandatory psychiatric evaluation of a person, if the person presented a threat to themselves or to others.

In March 2017, Logan was considered for release on parole by the state, but was ultimately denied amid opposition from relatives of the victims.

In December 2023, Logan was released from prison, nearly 8 years ahead of his projected release date of August 2032, due to "diminution credits" earned through good behavior in prison. The sheriff of Prince George's County, John D. B. Carr, and surviving relatives of Arnaud voiced their disapproval upon learning of the early release and vowed to urge the state to abolish diminution credits for the murderers of law enforcement officers in the future.

=== 2008: SWAT raids ===
On February 16, 2008, at approximately 3:30 a.m., PGSO SWAT team member, Cpl. Cal Bowers, was shot and critically wounded in the lower abdomen while serving a warrant as part of a task force with Deputy U.S. Marshals at an Econo Lodge on U.S. Route 1 in Laurel, Maryland. The round, a .223 caliber bullet, penetrated his ballistic shield and body armor. The suspect, Aaron Mason Lowry, was wanted for the shooting of Washington, D.C. policeman Antonio Duncan. Lowry was subsequently shot and killed by police. The injured deputy was flown to Baltimore Shock Trauma Center where he underwent surgery and was upgraded to serious but stable condition, and survived. After recovering, Bowers was awarded a Medal of Valor for his actions.

On July 29, 2008, the PGPD and PGSO raided the home of Cheye Calvo, the mayor of the Town of Berwyn Heights. The raid team did not coordinate their action with the local police department as required by mutual agreement, nor did they did not obtain a warrant or knock on the door to announce their presence. They raided the house with explosive devices and with firearms drawn. During the course of the raid, they shot and killed the Calvo family's two pet Labrador retriever dogs.

No charges were filed against the family. A PGSO internal investigation stated that the PGSO's actions were justified. In 2010, Sheriff Michael A. Jackson, defended the actions taken during the raid, saying: "Quite frankly we'd do it again tonight."

=== 2012–present: Accreditation ===
In June 2012, Deputy Lamar McIntyre was convicted of "malfeasance in office," upon having sex with a woman who was in custody at the county courthouse. In 2014, he pleaded guilty and was sentenced to three years in custody, with all but one year suspended. He was mandated to be required to submit to eighteen months of supervised probation.

In 2014, Melvin High was elected to another term as sheriff, and died in office in 2022.

In late 2015, the PGSO received Ford Taurus Police Interceptors for use in its vehicular fleet.

In mid-2016, the PGSO acquired a Lenco BearCat armored car.

In 2018, the PGSO became nationally accredited for the first time by the Commission on Accreditation for Law Enforcement Agencies, Inc. (CALEA) after more than 18 years of attempting to obtain accreditation. The PGSO's CALEA Team was officially notified of the award on March 24, 2018, in Dallas, Texas. The PGSO's sheriff was awarded the certificate of accreditation by the CALEA executive director, Mr. W. Craig Hartley Jr.

== Organization ==
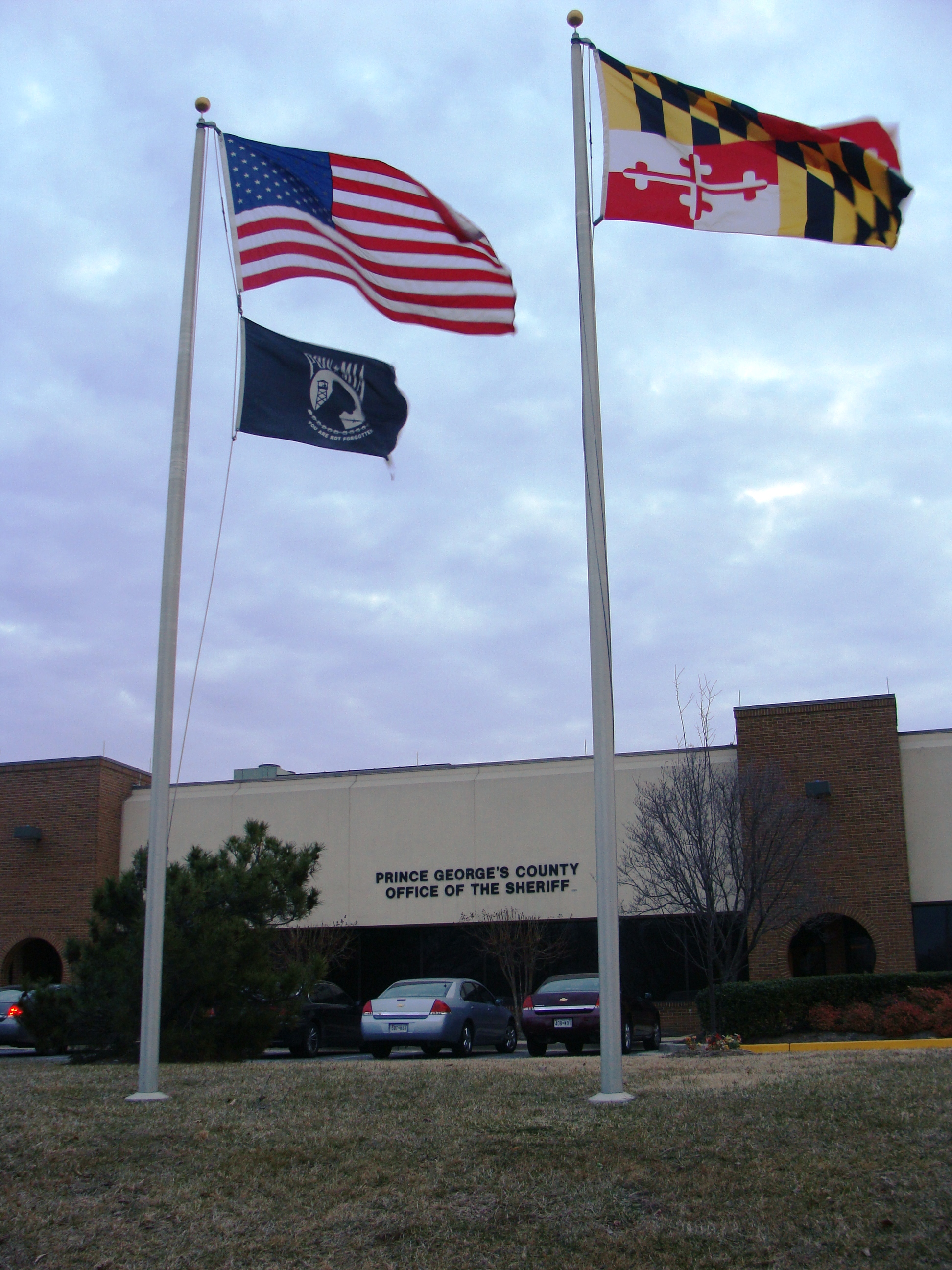
The Prince George's County Sheriff's Office substation in Largo, Maryland, in February 2009; it has since been closed.

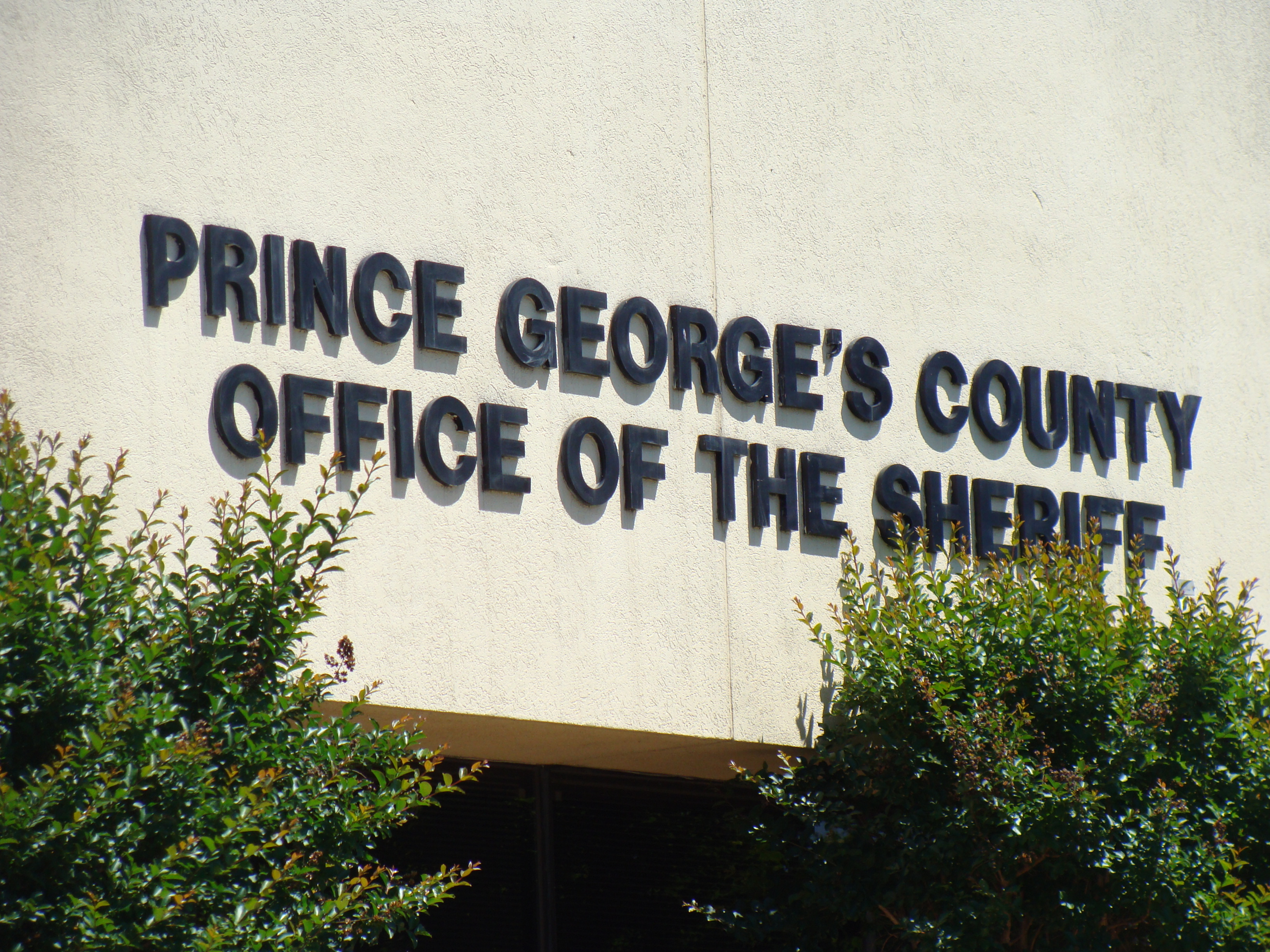
The Prince George's County Sheriff's Office substation in Largo, Maryland in May 2009; it has since been closed.

The sheriff is elected by the citizens of Prince George's County. The rank structure of the remaining members of the Sheriff's Office is, like many U.S. law enforcement agencies, modeled after the U.S. military. The ranks of student deputy through corporal are non-competitive, while sergeant through captain are competitive. The ranks of major, assistant sheriff, and chief assistant sheriff are appointed by, and serve at the discretion of the sheriff.

The PGSO is divided into three bureaus: court, field, and administration.

=== Headquarters ===
The Prince George's County Sheriff's Office's headquarters was located at the county seat of Upper Marlboro until 2000, when Sheriff Alonzo D. Black II, moved it to the nearby town of Largo where it remained until August 2008. His successor, Sheriff Michael A. Jackson returned the office headquarters to Upper Marlboro, near the Depot Pond, where it remains today. He was succeeded by Sheriff Melvin C. High in 2010, who was subsequently re-elected in 2014, and died in office in 2022. The current sheriff, D.B. Carr, continues to utilize the same facility.

=== Bureau of Court Services ===
The PGSO's Bureau of Court Services is based out of the court complex located within the municipality of Upper Marlboro and is responsible for the safety and security of the circuit court in Upper Marlboro, transportation of inmates, and to provide assistant security and law enforcement services to the District Court in Upper Marlboro and Hyattsville, as well as domestic violence liaison services. The Bureau of Court Services is subdivided into four sections: Circuit Court, District Court, Transportation, and Building Security. Specifically, the bureau is responsible for the safety and security of the 7th Judicial Circuit for the State of Maryland and the District Court for Prince George's County located within the court complexes and adjacent property in Upper Marlboro and Hyattsville. Yearly, between the Circuit Court, District Court, Transportation, and Building Security Sections, the bureau transports an average of 31,000 prisoners, effects 700 warrant and warrantless arrests, and interviews over 8,000 victims of domestic violence.

=== Bureau of Field Operations ===
The PGSO's Bureau of Field Operations was based out of the Largo Substation and is charged with: Civil/Landlord & Tenant, Domestic Violence Intervention Unit (DVIU or DV Unit), Warrant/Fugitive Squad, and Child Support Enforcement. The Civil section is responsible for service of criminal and civil summonses, and other court-ordered writs. The Landlord and Tenant (L&T) Section is responsible for notification of delinquent rent and/or mortgage payments/foreclosures, and court-ordered evictions. The section receives approximately 10,000 writs for non-payment each month.

The Domestic Violence Intervention Unit's primary responsibility is response to domestic-related 9-1-1 calls, court-ordered psychiatric commitments, and ex parte protective order service. The Prince George's DV Unit was the first in the state of Maryland and the first to operate on a 24-hour basis, and is considered a nationally recognized model. The unit receives on average over 1,200 orders per month, the highest in the state.

=== Bureau of Administration ===
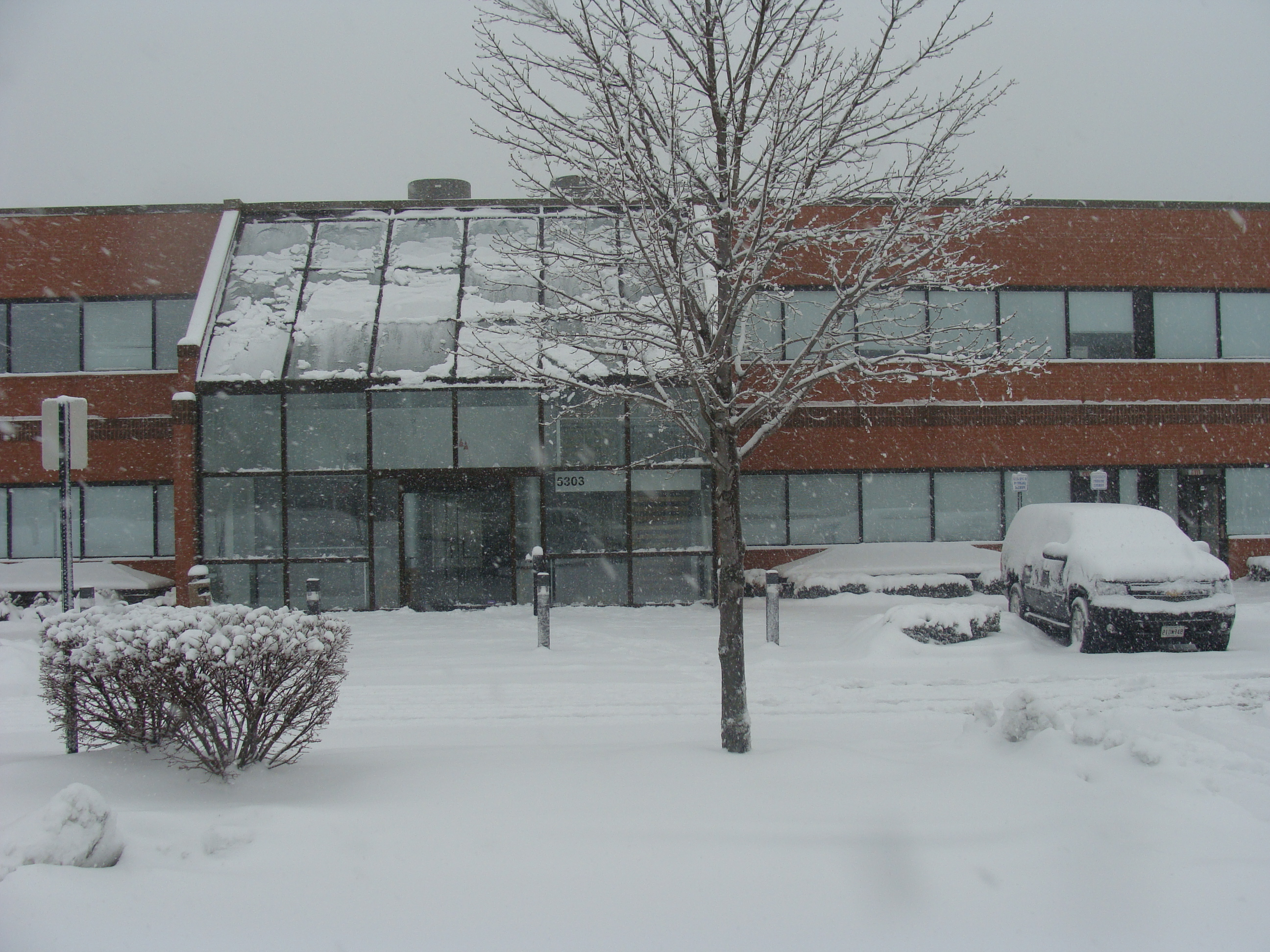
The Sheriff's Office headquarters in Upper Marlboro, Maryland in March 2009.

The PGSO's Bureau of Administration is based out of the main headquarters located in Upper Marlboro and contains the School Resource, Public Information Office (PIO), Recruiting, Training, and Internal Affairs. The Public Information Office (PIO) also operates an Explorers Post, Prince George's County Sheriff's Office Explorer Post #1696 for Prince George's County youths between the ages of 15 (or 14, provisionally) and 20. The sheriff and his command staff operate out of the Sheriff's Office complex located in Upper Marlboro. Most of the civilian support personnel also work out of this facility providing administrative duties such as NCIC monitoring, teletype (TTY), uniform and supply, criminal warrant research and organization, as well as other administrative duties as directed.

=== Special Operations Division ===
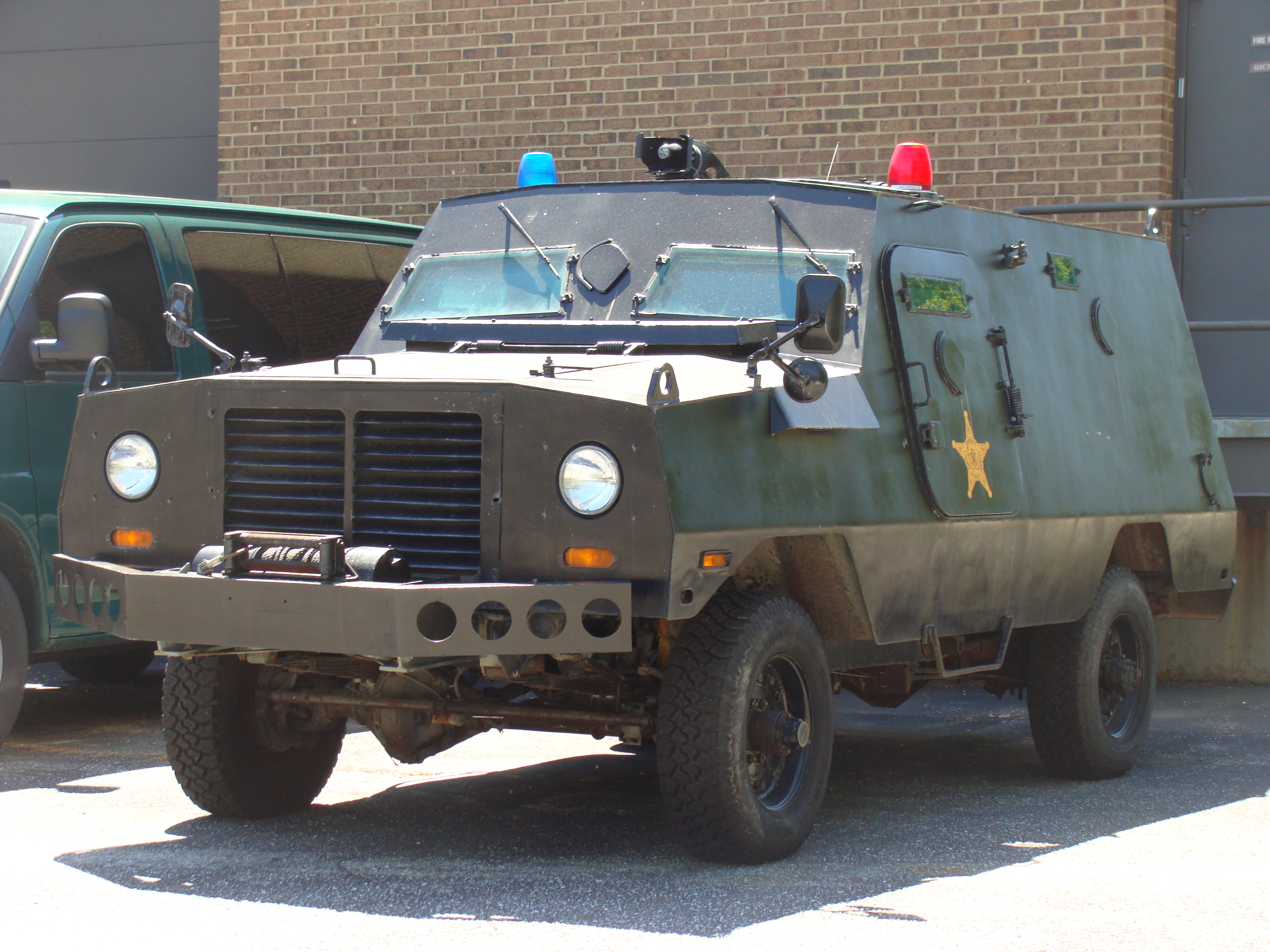
The Sheriff's Office armored Cadillac Gage Ranger tactical transport vehicle in May 2009.

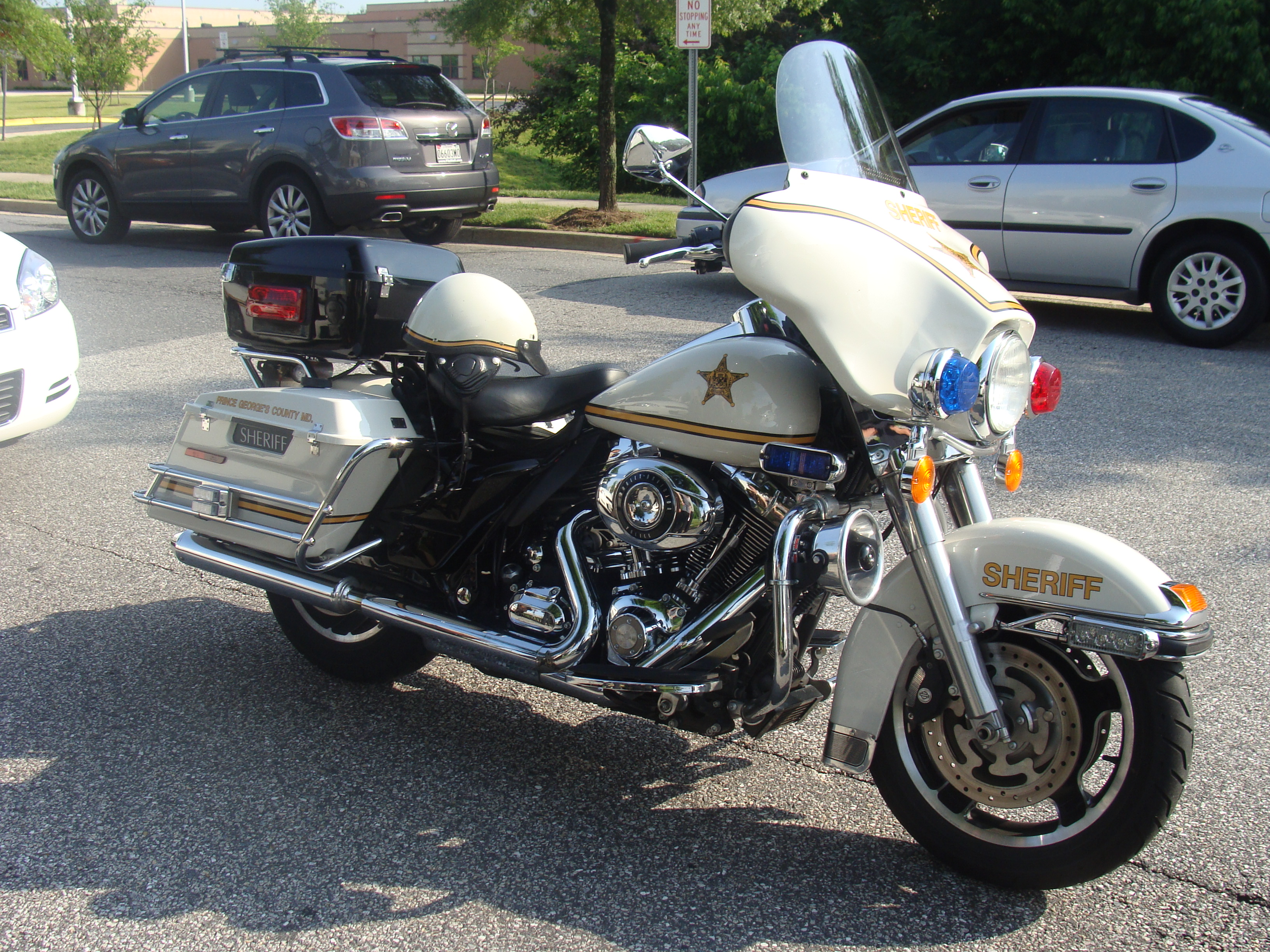
A "Police Edition" Harley-Davidson motorcycle of the Motors Unit in June 2009.

The PGSO's Special Operations Division (SOD) is responsible for specialized and specific services. The division is commanded by an assistant bureau chief and has different teams specifically responsible for: SST (SWAT)-response, executive and witness protection, riot control, crisis negotiations, intelligence gathering, motorcycle escort, and ceremonial duties.

==== Specialized units ====
- Specialized Services Team (SST)
- VIP/Witness Protection Team (VIPER)
- Civil Disturbance Unit (CDU)
- K-9
- Motorcycle Unit
- D.A.R.E.
- Hostage Negotiation Team
- Homeland Security and Intelligence

=== Union representation ===
Sworn PGSO personnel below the rank of captain, are represented by the Fraternal Order of Police (FOP), Lodge 112. The FOP is a labor union that provides, among other things, collective bargaining and legal assistance for its members. The current president of the FOP is Gary Yancy.

== Sheriffs ==
Sheriffs of Prince George's County
Name	Tenure	Party	Life
Thomas Hillary	1696		
Thomas Greenfield	1696–1699		
William Barton	1699–1702		
Josiah Wilson	1702–1705		
Thomas Addison	1705–1708		
Josiah Wilson	1708–1711		
Henry Boteler	1712–1713		
Thomas Clagett	1713–1716		
James Haddock	1717–1719		
Thomas Clagett	1719–1723		
Philip Lee	1723–1725		
Robert Tyler	1725–1727		
Richard Lee	1728–1731		
Thomas Brooke	1731–1734		
Richard Lee	1734–1737		
William Murdock	1737–1740		
John Hepburn	1740–1743		
John Cooke	1743–1746		
Joseph Belt Jr.	1746		
William Mauduit	1747		
Osborn Sprigg	1747–1750		Died on January 8, 1750.
John Cooke	1750–1752		
Turner Wooten	1753–1755		
Edward Crabb	1756		
Colemore Beans	1756–1757		
Thomas Contee	1757–1758		
Joshua Beall	1759–1761		
John Rowe	1761–1762		
George Scott	1763–1765		
William Turner Wooten	1766–1768		
John Addison	1769–1771		
Ralph Forester	1772–1775		
Frank Leeke	1775–1777		
Thomas Duckett	1777–1779		
Thomas Williams	1780–1782		
John Beall	1783–1785		
Nicholas Blacklock	1786–1789		
Edward Lloyd Wailes	1789–1792		
William Dent Beall	1793		
William John Jackson	1793–1795		
Joseph Boone	1796–1797		
Notley Maddox	1798–1800		
Thomas Macgill	1800–1803		
Alexius Boone	1803–1806		
Notley Maddox	1806–1809		
John Darnell	1809–1812		
George Semmes	1812–1814	F-MD	
Basil Bowling	1815–1817	F-MD	
Joseph Isaac	1818		
George H. Lanham	1818–1821	F-MD	
Thomas Osbourn	1821–1824	R-MD	
George Semmes	1824–1826	F-MD	
Joseph Isaac	1826		
George Semmes	1827	F-MD	
Edward W. Belt	1828–1830		
Thomas Bruce	1831–1833		
Thomas Baldwin	1834–1836		
Samuel Fowler	1837–1839		
Thomas H. Edelen	1839–1841		
John R. Baden	1841–1843		
Eli S. Baldwin	1843–1845		
John R. Baden	1846–1848		
John T. Chew	1849–1851		
Charles S. Middleton	1852–1853		
Thomas H. Osbourn of Charles	1853–1855	W-MD	
Daniel R. Dyer	1855–1857		
John W. Webster	1858–1859		
Daniel R. Dyer	1859–1861		
Peter G. Grimes	1861–1863		
J. F. Richardson	1863–1865		
John E. Turton	1865–1867		
Nathan Masters	1871–1873		
Harrison Wallis	1873–1875	R-MD	
James N. W. Wilson	1877–1879		
James H. Ritchie	1879–1881		
John H. Ritchie	1881–1883		
Pinkney A. Scaggs	1883–1885		
Richard W. Beall	1889–1891		
Thomas M. Underwood	1895–1897	R-MD	
Benjamin F. Roby	1897–1899		
Edward T. Shea	1899–1901		
Benjamin N. Hardisty	1901–1903	R-MD	
Theodore B. Middleton	1903–1905		
James A. Sweeney	1905–1907	R-MD	
Frank P. Hurd	1907–1909	D-MD	
Samuel E. Sweeney	1909–1911	D-MD	
Arthur B. Suit	1911–1913	D-MD	
George W. Hardy	1913–1915		
Robert F. Gates	1915–1917		
W. Wesley Beall	1917–1919		
Eli S. Harrison	1919–1921		
James A. Sweeney	1921–1923	R-MD	
John J. Fink	1923–1926		
Charles S. Early	1926–1930		
W. Curtis Hopkins	1930–1934		
J. Guy Bell	1934–1938	D-MD	
William E. Clifton	1938–1942	D-MD	
R. Earle Sheriff	1942–1946	D-MD	
T. Ward Martin	1946–1950		
Carleton G. Beall	1950–1954		
J. Lee Ball	1954–1962	R-MD	
William J. Jamieson	1962–1966		
William J. Kersey	1966–1970		
Don Edward Ansell	1970–1978		
James V. Aluisi	1978–1998	D-MD	
Alonzo D. Black II	1998–2002	D-MD	Born March 10, 1945 (age 81)
Michael A. Jackson	2002–2010	D-MD	
Melvin C. High	2010 – November 2022	D-MD	Died in office
Darren Palmer (acting)	November 2022 – December 2022		
John D.B. Carr	2022–present	D-MD	

== Line of duty deaths ==
There have been two PGSO deputy sheriffs killed in the line of duty, both in August 2002.

Name	Date	Details
Sergeant James Victor "Jim" Arnaud	Thursday, August 29, 2002	Gunfire
Deputy First Class Elizabeth "Liz" Licera Magruder	Thursday, August 29, 2002	Gunfire

== Rank structure ==
Rank	Insignia	Description
Sheriff		The Sheriff is the highest-ranking law enforcement officer of Prince George's County and is held accountable by the citizens of the county. The sheriff's rank insignia is a pentagon-shaped set of five, five-pointed gold stars.
Chief Assistant Sheriff		The Chief Assistant Sheriff of Prince George's County is the second in command and handles the day-to-day operations of the Sheriff's Office. The Chief Assistant Sheriff's rank is symbolized by four, five-pointed gold stars.
Assistant Sheriff		The Assistant Sheriff (Bureau Chief) is the third in command and has the responsibility of his/her bureau's day-to-day operations. The Assistant Sheriff's rank is symbolized by three, five-pointed stars.
Major		Majors serve as Deputy Bureau Chiefs and are fourth in command. They serve under the Bureau Chief (Assistant Sheriff). The rank insignia of a major is a gold oak leaf.
Captain		Captains serve as Assistant Bureau Chiefs and serve under the Deputy Bureau Chief (major) and are in command of one or more divisions within the State Police. The rank insignia is symbolized by two connected gold bars.
Lieutenant		Lieutenants serve as Division Commanders and may serve as an acting captain. They are directed by the Assistant Bureau Chief. The rank insignia is symbolized by a single gold bar.
Sergeant		A squad sergeant may serve as an acting lieutenant and is in charge of a squad of deputy sheriffs at the rank of corporal and below. The sergeant's rank is symbolized by three gold chevrons bordered by a black background.
Corporal		A corporal is a first-line supervisor and is known colloquially as a "9-car". A corporal may serve as an acting sergeant. The rank insignia of a corporal is symbolized by two gold chevrons bordered by a black background.
Deputy first class		The rank of deputy first class, also known as private first class, is awarded as a time-in-rate promotion, and is bestowed to a deputy who has served for a certain amount of time, and passes a testing process.
Deputy sheriff		Recruits successfully completing the police academy are appointed as deputy sheriffs, private.
Student deputy		Trainees are known as student deputies while attending the police academy.

== Fleet ==
The Prince George's County Sheriff's Office currently operates a fleet consisting primarily of sixth-generation Ford Taurus Police Interceptors, ninth generation Chevrolet Impalas and Ford Crown Victoria Police Interceptors. It also operates the Ford Police Interceptor Utility, both the post-2013 and post-2016 variants. The PGSO's transportation unit uses specialized Chevrolet and Dodge vans, whereas the motorcycle unit uses Harley-Davidson Police Edition motorcycles. The PGSO also has a Freightliner FS-65 bus.

In the past, the PGSO used eighth generation Chevrolet Impalas, first generation Ford Crown Victorias, fifth generation Pontiac Grand Prix sedans, Jeep Cherokees, as well as a few 1999 to 2001 Chevrolet Luminas.

The current paint scheme of the PGSO's marked cruisers is a white base paint with brown and gold striping with the word "SHERIFF" emblazoned on the side doors. In the past, the PGSO's horizontal vehicular stripe decals were green and gold, with a simple PGSO patch door decal being used before that, along with black "SHERIFF" lettering written in a sans-serif typeface. The light bars used on the PGSO's cars are a slim Whelen Generation II LED version, with red and blue lighting. The Domestic Violence Intervention Unit has all marked vehicles with Panasonic Toughbook computers assigned to the cars.

=== Current vehicles ===
Vehicle		Country	Type
Prince George's County Sheriff's Office, School Resource Division Chevrolet Impala in December 2006. Prince George's County Sheriff's Office marked K-9 Chevrolet Impala in October 2009. The Prince George's County Sheriff's star with striping decals emblazoned on the side of a 2007 police-package Chevrolet Impala in December 2008.	Ninth-generation Chevrolet Impala	United States (origin); Canada (manufacture)	Cruiser and K-9 transport
	Ford Police Interceptor Sedan (Note: Based on the sixth-generation Ford Taurus; acquired in 2015.)	United States	Cruiser
	Fifth-generation Ford Police Interceptor Utility (Note: Both 2013 to 2016 and 2016 to 2018 variants are used.)	United States	SUV
	Sixth-generation Ford Police Interceptor Utility	United States	SUV
	Lenco BearCat	United States	Armored personnel carrier
	Cadillac Gage Ranger	United States	Armored personnel carrier

=== Past vehicles ===
Vehicle	Country	Type
Eighth-generation Chevrolet Impala	United States (origin); Canada (manufacture)	Cruiser
First generation Ford Crown Victoria	United States (origin); Canada (manufacture)	Cruiser
Fifth generation Pontiac Grand Prix	United States	Cruiser
Jeep Cherokee	United States	SUV
Chevrolet Lumina	United States (origin); Canada (manufacture)	Cruiser
Cadillac Gage Commando	United States	Armored personnel carrier

== See also ==
- List of law enforcement agencies in Maryland
