= William Murdock =

Colonial American politician (c.1710-1769)

- Born: c. 1710
- Died: 17 October 1769; Maryland, United States
- Occupations: merchant, planter, gentleman
- Known for: Maryland delegate to the Stamp Act Congress
- Children: 8

William Murdock (c. 1710 – October 17, 1769) was an American statesman in colonial Maryland. During the tensions leading up to the American Revolution, he was an important spokesman for the rights of the colonists. He was a delegate representing Maryland in the Stamp Act Congress of 1765.

== Background ==
Murdock was born around 1710 as the son of Capt. John Murdock, a merchant and his wife Katherine Barton. Murdock was likely a first, or second generation Marylander, his father was enormously wealthy. Around 1729, Murdock married Anne Addison. When his father died in 1733, Murdock acquired all of his landholdings.

In 1737 he first served in public office as sheriff of Prince George's County. At the time of his first election he was recorded to have owned 3,291 acres of land in Prince George's County. Murdock served as sheriff until 1740.

In 1748 Murdock enlisted in Capt. George Beall's Troop of Horse, representing Prince George's County. He would go on to serve in Maryland's lower house, representing Prince George's County from 1749 to1751. From 1749 to 1769 he served as burgess for Prince George's County.

In 1755, Murdock's first wife Anne died. On January 1, 1757, Murdock married Anne's first cousin, Margaret Dulany, the widow of Alexander Hamilton and daughter of Daniel Dulany the Elder, one of Maryland's most prominent families.

=== Stamp Act Congress ===
In 1765 when protests over the Stamp Act resulted in calling a Congress of the several colonies in New York City, the Maryland Assembly sent Murdock as one of its delegates. Delegates from the Stamp Act Congress later produced the Declaration of Rights and Grievances.

Murdock died on October 17, 1769, at his home, Padsworth Farm, in Prince George's County, Maryland. At the time of his death, he was known to have at least 11 slaves and 2 indentured servants. His property holdings included at least 5,263 acres in Prince George's and Frederick counties, as well as lots in Annapolis.

== See also ==
- Tobacco colonies
- Colonial families of Maryland
