= Michael A. Jackson (politician) =

American politician (born 1964)

Michael Jackson
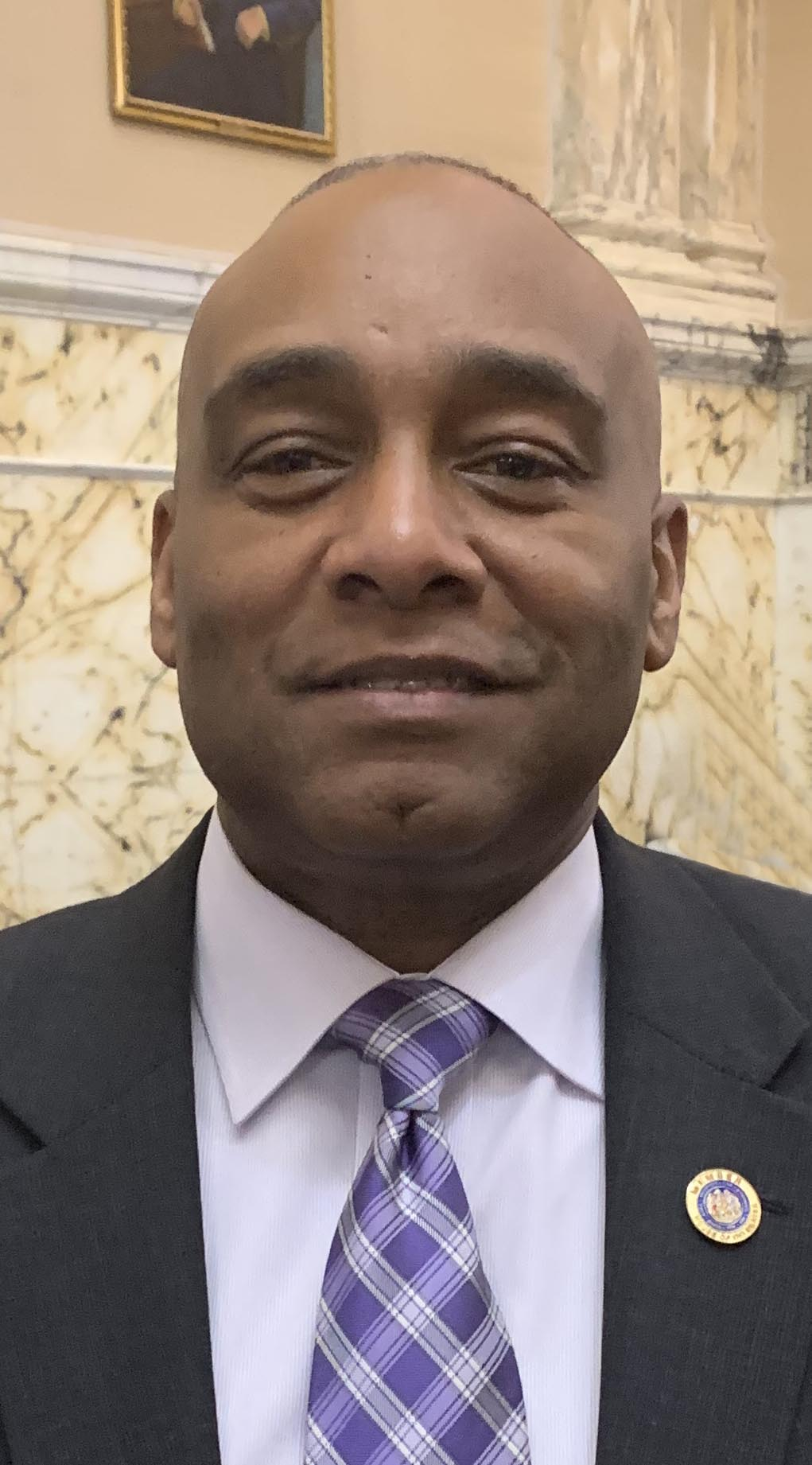
- Jackson in 2019

Secretary of the Maryland State Police
- Incumbent
- Assumed office November 12, 2025
- Preceded by: Daniel Pickett (acting)

Member of the Maryland Senate from the 27th district
- In office January 13, 2021 – November 1, 2025
- Preceded by: Mike Miller
- Succeeded by: Kevin Harris

Member of the Maryland House of Delegates from the 27B district
- In office January 14, 2015 – January 13, 2021
- Preceded by: Mark N. Fisher
- Succeeded by: Rachel Jones

Sheriff of Prince George's County
- In office December 2, 2002 – December 6, 2010
- Preceded by: Alonzo Black
- Succeeded by: Melvin High

Personal details
- Born: Michael Angelo Jackson; March 29, 1964 (age 62) Cheverly, Maryland, U.S.
- Party: Democratic
- Spouse: Kim Jackson
- Education: DeVry University (BS); Johns Hopkins University (MS)

Military service
- Branch/service: United States Marine Corps
- Years of service: 1982–1985
- Unit: United States Marine Corps Reserve

Michael Angelo Jackson (born March 29, 1964) is a former member of the Maryland Senate representing District 27 in Calvert, Charles and Prince George's counties. Jackson was a member of the Maryland House of Delegates representing District 27B in Calvert and Prince George's counties from 2015 to 2021, and the sheriff of Prince George's County from 2002 to 2010.

== Early life and education ==
Jackson was born on March 29, 1964. He attended Crossland High School in Temple Hills, Maryland. From 1982 to 1985, Jackson served in the United States Marine Corps Reserve. In 1986, he received his Bachelor of Science in electronic engineering technology from the DeVry Institute of Technology and graduated from the PELP (Police Executive Leadership Program) master's program at Johns Hopkins University.

== Career ==
=== Sheriff of Prince George's County ===
After joining the Prince George's County Sheriff's Office, Jackson became the Fraternal Order of Police 112/DSA union president. In 2002, then a corporal, Jackson won the election for county sheriff by a narrow margin against the incumbent sheriff, Alonzo D. Black II. Jackson was also the President of the Maryland Sheriff's Association until his retirement in 2010. Jackson is a member of the American Legion post 275; is a member of the Moose Lodge 453 and the Mitchellville Kiwanis Club. His 2010 campaign for County Executive of Prince George's County was unsuccessful when he lost to Rushern Baker.

Jackson's department created the first 24-hour domestic-violence unit in the State of Maryland. He is a recipient of the 2008 Victims' Rights Caucus Award, and the Allied Profession Award. In 2007, he also received the Maryland Network Against Domestic Violence, Law Enforcement Officer of the Year Award. His department also received the 2007 Governor's Award.

Pursuant to Maryland Common Law, Jackson's position as the elected sheriff made him the senior law enforcement official of his jurisdiction and his authority superseded all others within the county. Jackson, a Democrat, served for two terms, from 2002 to 2010. The area that he served contains an estimated 820,852 residents, holds the Washington Redskins Stadium (Fedex Field, the largest stadium in the NFL), the University of Maryland, College Park, and the National Harbor. Although violent crimes had dropped since 2006, in 2007, Prince George's County reported over 130 homicides, the highest rate of any county in Maryland.

==== Berwyn Heights mayor's residence drug raid ====
In July 2008, Jackson's agency, investigating a drug-smuggling ring, raided a private residence in Berwyn Heights, Maryland, handcuffing and interrogating those inside, and shooting two dogs. Almost immediately afterward, the home was revealed to be that of Cheye Calvo, the mayor of Berwyn Heights. The incident ignited much local and national controversy, with allegations of excessive force, civil rights violations, and failure to co-ordinate with the Berwyn Heights Police Department.

Jackson spoke at a number of press conferences following the incident, in defense of his department's role in the raid. Despite the controversy, the department did not officially clear the Calvos of wrongdoing until 2010. While an internal investigation by the Sheriff's department claimed to have found no wrongdoing, and Sheriff Jackson publicly praised the officers involved, a lawsuit was filed, and the Federal Bureau of Investigation is monitoring the situation, as part of a civil rights review requested by the Calvos. In addition, Maryland Senator Thomas V. "Mike" Miller said, "The people of Prince George's County demand better" and also stated that he pleaded with Jackson to make an adequate apology for the incident. It took more than a year for Sheriff Jackson to offer any kind of apology whatsoever.

In August 2010 while campaigning to be elected county executive, Jackson stated, "We've apologized for the incident, but we will never apologize for taking drugs off our streets," adding "Quite frankly, we'd do it again. Tonight." Prince George's County settled the lawsuit in 2011, paying an undisclosed sum to Calvo, and agreeing to create new regulations on the treatment of animals and the deployment of SWAT teams.

==== Family dog killed while serving eviction notice ====
Two years after the raid on Mayor Calvo's residence, a deputy in Jackson's department shot and killed a family dog while serving an eviction notice. The deputy was allegedly supposed to wait for animal control to arrive but failed to follow proper procedures for serving an eviction. As a result, another county resident, Donna Williams of Forest Heights, was the latest victim of what Mayor Calvo said, "is part of a pattern". According to county spokeswoman Sergeant Yakeisha Hines, "the only reason Animal Control is asked to be on scene, is to take possession of the dog after the family is evicted". In this case, Sheriff Jackson's agency was not evicting Donna Williams, but only serving her with an eviction notice. Donna Williams indicated that she did not believe they knocked. When asked for comment, spokeswoman Hines merely stated, "That's her opinion". Williams was hospitalized for post-traumatic stress disorder. In addition, Williams said Jackson told her that he was sorry but that his deputies "did what they had to". Even before an internal investigation by the department was completed, Sheriff Jackson said the deputy in question "did the right thing".

==== Campaign treasurer indicted for union embezzlement ====
Jackson testified in August 2010 that one year before his campaign treasurer was accused of embezzlement from the local Fraternal Order of Police lodge, he had rejected the union president's requests that he review evidence of the alleged embezzlement. After his treasurer was indicted, Jackson suspended her with pay from her Sheriff's department position. When asked whether it was permissible to steal union funds, Jackson stated, "I have no opinion on that."

=== Maryland Delegate ===
Jackson was first elected to the Maryland House of Delegates in November 2014 and was sworn in January 2015. He was assigned to the Appropriations committee and serves on its Public Safety and Administration and its Oversight on Pensions sub-committees. In 2019 he was selected to be the House chair of the Joint Committee on Cybersecurity, Information Technology and Biotechnology. He was the chairman of the Prince George's County Delegation and a member of the Legislative Black Caucus of Maryland. Jackson resigned from his seat on January 13, 2021, to accept appointment to the state senate.

=== Maryland Senator ===
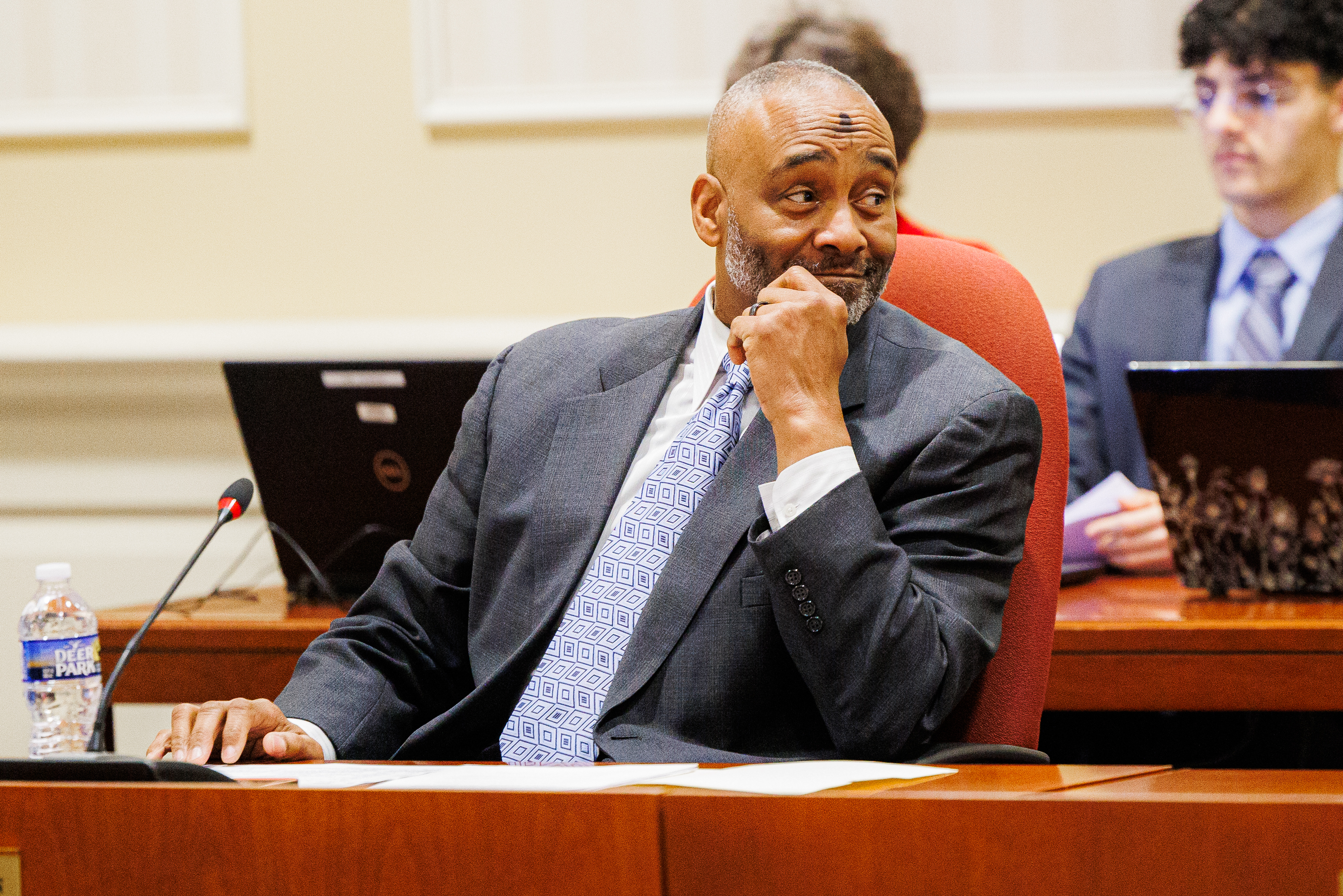
Jackson in the Budget and Taxation Committee, 2024

Jackson was appointed to the Maryland Senate by Governor Larry Hogan on January 13, 2021, to replace Mike Miller, who resigned on December 23, 2020.

==== Maryland Question 1 ====
During the 2023 legislative session, Jackson was the only Democrat in the Maryland General Assembly who voted against Question 1, a voter referendum that established a right to abortion in the Constitution of Maryland.

=== Maryland Secretary of State Police ===
On October 10, 2025, Maryland Governor Wes Moore named Jackson as the next Secretary of State Police, succeeding Roland Butler, who retired.

== Personal life ==
Jackson is married to Kim Jackson and has one child.

== See also ==
- Prince George's County, Maryland
- Prince George's County Sheriff's Office
