= Alonzo Black =

American sheriff of Maryland

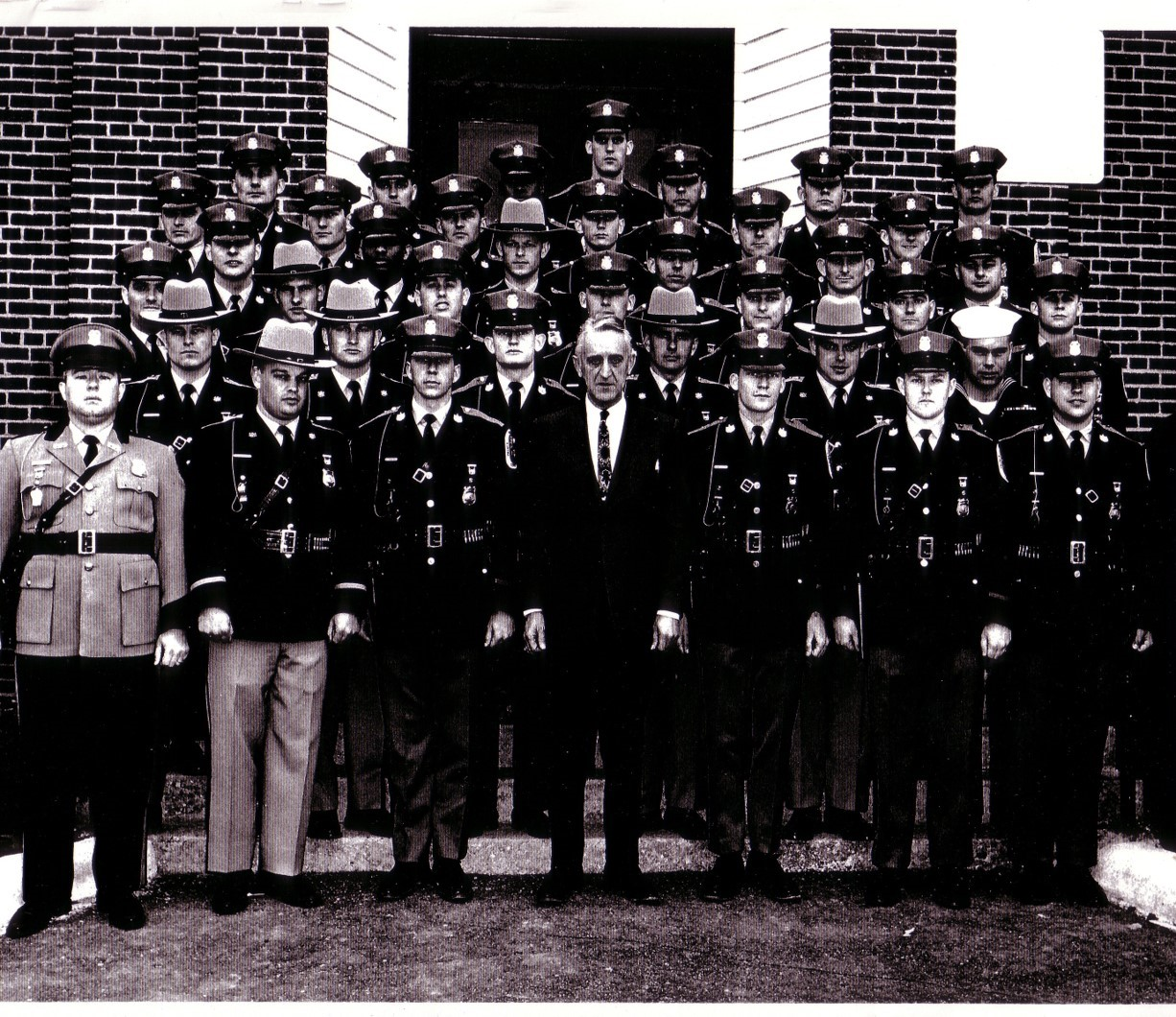
- Black standing with his police academy class in the 1960s

Sheriff of Prince George's County
- In office December 8, 1998 – December 2, 2002
- Governor: Parris Glendening
- County executive: Wayne K. Curry
- Chief assistant sheriff: John Moss
- Assistant sheriffs: John W. Thompson and Frank Kobilis
- Preceded by: James V. Aluisi
- Succeeded by: Michael Jackson

Personal details
- Born: Alonzo D. Black II; March 10, 1945 (age 81) Panama City, Florida, U.S.
- Party: Democratic
- Education: Bowie State University
- Profession: Lawyer
- Military career
- Allegiance: United States
- Branch: United States Marine Corps
- Service years: 1963–1967
- Rank: Sergeant
- Conflicts: Vietnam War (WIA)

Alonzo D. Black II (born March 10, 1945) is a former sheriff who served in Prince George's County, Maryland. He held the position of sheriff from 1998 to 2002. During his tenure, Black made significant contributions to law enforcement and community engagement in Prince George's County.

== Early life and education ==
Black was born in Panama City, Florida on March 10, 1945. He developed an interest for public service and law enforcement from an early age. In 1963, Black went into the US military, served for years, fought in battle, and got wounded in the Vietnam War. After receiving an honorable discharge from the United States Marine Corps in 1967, Black concluded his service as a decorated combat sergeant. Black pursued his higher education at Prince George's Community College and Bowie State University, where he graduated with honors in 1974. He earned a Bachelor of Science degree in business administration, graduating cum laude. Later in 1974, while concurrently pursuing his law degree at the University of Maryland, Black was appointed as a detective sergeant for the Prince George's County State's Attorney's Office.

== Career ==
In 1967 Black joined the Prince George's County Police Department as the first African American policeman hired by Prince George's County.

Following his admission to the Maryland State Bar in 1977, Black embarked on a career as a prosecuting attorney, serving in both the district and circuit courts. He became an Assistant Counsel to the state in the Prince George's County State's Attorney Office. For a period of two years, he played a key role in coordinating grand jury cases. In 1979, Black then joined the 459th Airlift Wing (459 AW) which is an Air Force Reserve Command unit based at Andrews Air Force Base in Maryland where he went on to become a staff sergeant and served 2 years in communications and combat readiness. In 1992, Black transitioned to civil practice, retiring from his position as a prosecuting attorney.

Black joined the Prince George's County Sheriff's Office as a deputy and legal counsel. He quickly rose through the ranks, demonstrating leadership skills and a commitment to serving the community. In 1993, Black was appointed to the position of Assistant Sheriff. Black's dedication to public safety and his approach to law enforcement earned him recognition within the department. Within a year, he was promoted to the role of chief assistant sheriff, becoming the second-in-command of the agency. He held this position until he ran in the 1998 election. In 1998 Alonzo Black wins the election and is voted as the first African American Sheriff of Prince George's County.

During his tenure as sheriff, Black implemented several initiatives aimed at enhancing community relations, improving public safety, and reducing crime rates in Prince George's County. He actively collaborated with local organizations, community leaders, and law enforcement agencies to develop comprehensive strategies for crime prevention and community outreach.

Black's efforts to promote transparency and accountability within the Sheriff's Office resulted in the implementation of various reforms, including enhanced training programs for deputies, improved internal policies, and increased community involvement in shaping law enforcement practices.

== Personal life ==
Black lives in Fort Washington, Maryland.
