= Buck Lodge Middle School =

Location
- 2611 Buck Lodge Road; Adelphi, Maryland 20783; United States
- Coordinates: 39.010681°N 76.960672°W

Information
- Other name: BLMS
- Type: Public middle school
- School district: Prince George's County Public Schools
- NCES School ID: 240051000993
- Principal: Kenneth Nance
- Teaching staff: 78.00 (on an FTE basis)
- Grades: 6–8
- Enrollment: 1,233 (2016-2017)
- Student to teacher ratio: 15.81
- Colors: Black and Gold
- Mascot: Viking
- Website: www.pgcps.org/bucklodge

Buck Lodge Middle School (BLMS) is a public middle school in Adelphi, Maryland, United States. It is part of the Prince George's County Public Schools district. It is zoned for the High Point High School attendance area and has a mandatory uniform policy in effect.

== History ==
Buck Lodge Middle School was originally a junior high school and covers 26 acres of land, including several large areas dedicated to athletics and sport. The original school building covered 5 acres. In 1966, several rooms were added, including a library and a band room. A wing dedicated to orthopedics was completed in 1981.

Buck Lodge Middle School changed from a junior high school to a middle school in 1981. From 1991 to 1992, the school was completely renovated and remodeled, with students returning to the newly-refurbished school in September 1992.

On February 4, 2014, U.S. President Barack H. Obama II visited the school, where he delivered an oration before an audience of the school's students.

== Etymology ==
Buck Lodge Middle School derives its name from the 250-acre Buck Lodge, which was given by King George I of Great Britain to Arthur Nelson in 1717. The lodge was later given to Benjamin Belt, who, in 1746, sold it to Thomas Owens of Great Britain, who then lost possession of it to Count Demanu. The lodge later came under possession of the Pywell family, who kept it until the Maryland state government purchased it. In 1956, the Prince George's County Board of Education acquired the land.
