= Joel Martin Rubin =

American politician and commentator (born 1971)

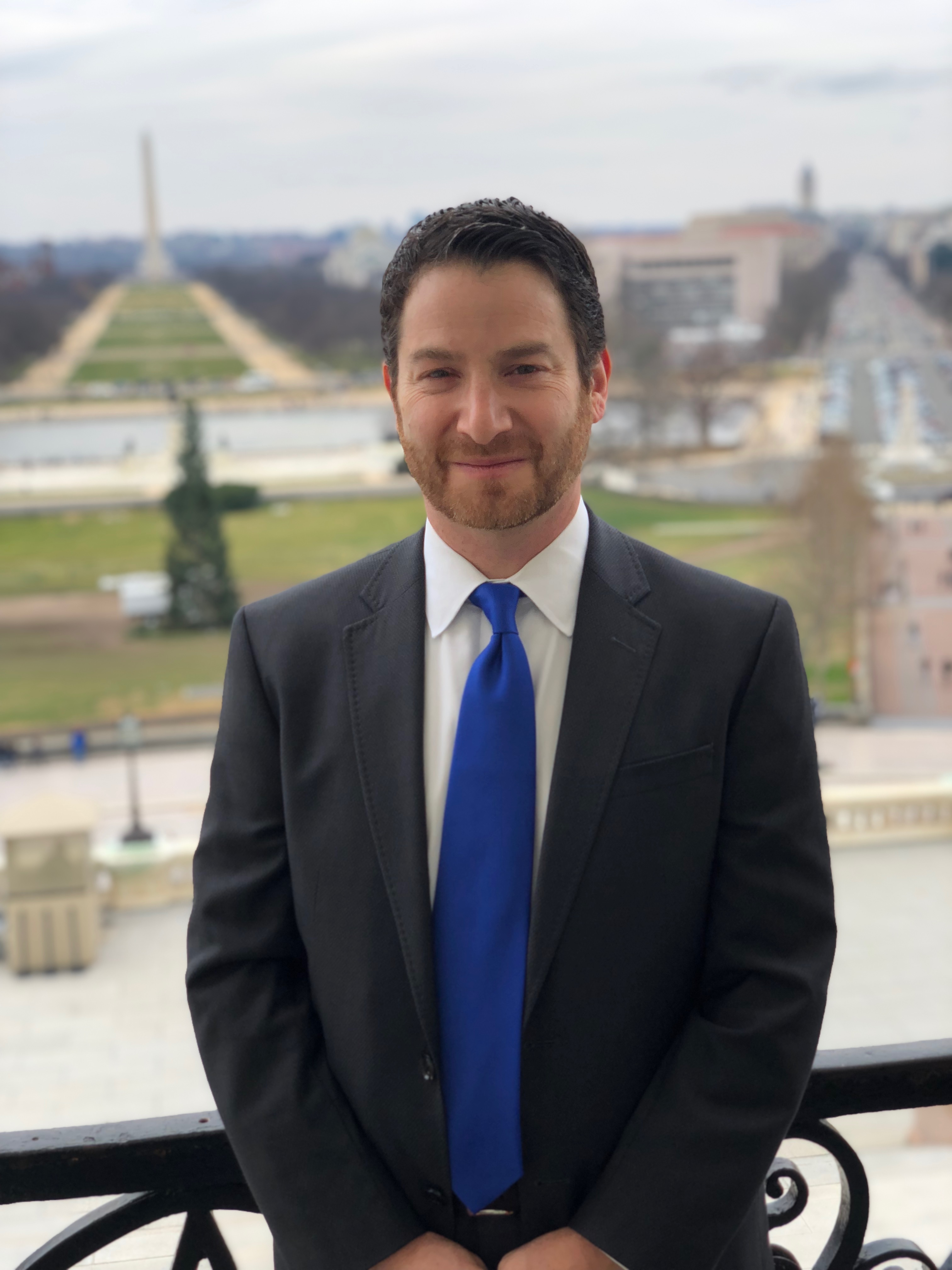
- Rubin in 2019

Member of the Chevy Chase Town Council
- In office May 10, 2017 – May 10, 2023
- Preceded by: Fred Cecere
- Succeeded by: Stephanie Martz

Deputy Assistant Secretary of State for House Affairs
- In office May 5, 2014 – July 2015
- President: Barack Obama
- Secretary: John Kerry

Personal details
- Born: April 8, 1971 (age 55) Pittsburgh, Pennsylvania, U.S.
- Party: Democratic
- Spouse: Nilmini Gunaratne (m. 2003)
- Children: 3
- Education: Brandeis University (BS); Carnegie Mellon University (MS)
- Website: Campaign website

Joel Martin Rubin (born April 8, 1971) is an American politician and media commentator on domestic political and Middle East affairs. He served as a member of the Chevy Chase Town Council from 2017 to 2023, and previously worked as a senior State Department official in the Obama administration. In 2020, Rubin also directed Jewish outreach for Bernie Sanders' presidential campaign.

== Early life and education ==
Rubin was born on April 8, 1971, and raised in a Conservative Jewish family in Pittsburgh, Pennsylvania. He attended Brandeis University for his undergraduate education, where he received a bachelor's degree in politics. He went on to study Carnegie Mellon University's Heinz College, where he received an M.S. in public policy and management with a minor in business administration.

== Career ==
=== Advocacy ===
Rubin served in the Peace Corps in Costa Rica. Rubin was the founding Political Director of J Street, a liberal organization dedicated to promoting the two state solution and secular left wing values; Rubin worked on Capitol Hill as a legislative assistant to U.S. Senators Tom Harkin of Iowa and Frank Lautenberg of New Jersey, both Democrats.

=== Media ===
Rubin appears as a political commentator on American networks such as MSNBC and Fox News; and on international networks such as i24, China Global Television Network, and Al-Jazeera. He also writes political and national security commentary for Axios, The Forward, Washington Jewish Week, and The Hill.

Rubin has also appeared in Jewish magazines for his political work.

=== Executive Branch ===
Rubin worked for three U.S. government agencies in the administrations of Presidents George W. Bush and Barack Obama – the Department of Energy, USAID, and State Department. In January 2015, when he served in the State Department as the Deputy Assistant Secretary of State for House Affairs in the Bureau of Legislative Affairs, he was an official government witness and testified to the House Select Committee on Benghazi. Rubin left the U.S. State Department in July 2015.

== Political involvement ==
Rubin was a founding board member of the Jewish Democratic Council of America, established in 2017 in the wake of the Unite the Right rally in Charlottesville, Virginia. In 2020, he joined Bernie Sanders' 2020 presidential campaign as head of Jewish outreach, and worked as a policy volunteer for the Joe Biden's presidential campaign following the Democratic primaries. From 2020 to 2022, Rubin worked as an executive director for the American Jewish Congress advocacy group.

Rubin was a surrogate for the 2012 Barack Obama presidential campaign; an advocate for the Iran nuclear deal as the Policy Director for Ploughshares Fund; and as a commentator on the 2012 Benghazi attack. Following the 2018 Pittsburgh synagogue shooting at his hometown synagogue, Tree of Life – Or L'Simcha Congregation, Joel appeared on Fox News and MSNBC to discuss the attack, later commenting as well on the rise of antisemitism in America after the 2019 Poway synagogue shooting. Rubin frequently comments on foreign policy and congressional politics for networks such as Fox News, MSNBC, BBC, Al Jazeera.

=== Elections ===
Rubin ran for Congress in 2016 in Maryland's 8th congressional district, in what was the most expensive Congressional primary in American history at the time. He was defeated in the Democratic primary, placing second to last with 1.1 percent of the vote. Rubin was elected to the Chevy Chase Town Council in 2017, and was subsequently re-elected in 2019 and 2021.

In 2018, Rubin unsuccessfully ran for the Maryland House of Delegates in District 18, seeking to succeed outgoing state delegates Jeff Waldstreicher and Ana Sol Gutierrez. He received endorsements from the Montgomery County Education Association and NARAL Pro-Choice Maryland during his campaign, but was defeated in the Democratic primary, placing fifth with 11.2 percent of the vote. In 2022, Rubin applied to run for the Maryland House of Delegates in District 18, seeking to replace state delegate Al Carr on the ballot after Carr withdrew his candidacy hours before the candidate filing deadline on April 15 to run for the county council, and no candidates were able to file to run in his place before the deadline. The Montgomery County Democratic Central Committee nominated one of its members, Aaron Kaufman, to fill vacancy on April 20, 2022.

On July 24, 2023, Rubin announced that he would run for Congress in Maryland's 6th congressional district in 2024, seeking to succeed outgoing U.S. Representative David Trone. During the Democratic primary, he ran on a platform that included national and foreign policy issues. Rubin dropped out of the race on March 6, 2024, and endorsed former National Telecommunications and Information Administration deputy administrator April McClain Delaney.

== Political positions ==
During his tenure at the U.S. State Department, Rubin worked to prevent Congress from passing a resolution of disapproval of the Iran Nuclear Deal with a veto-proof majority.

During his 2016 congressional campaign, Rubin said he supported raising the federal minimum wage to $15 an hour, increasing infrastructure spending, and strengthening Social Security and Medicare by removing the cap on payroll taxes. He also spoke against the Trans-Pacific Partnership, citing concerns over protections for workers at home and abroad, and said he supported moving funding away from the U.S. Department of Defense and toward education.

In October 2017, Rubin voted to approve a $50,000 grant to the Friends of the Capital Crescent Trail, a trail group that was suing to prevent the construction of the Purple Line, saying that the companies contracted to build the transit line were not following commitments to ease the impact to the town. The grant was rejected by the Chevy Chase Town Council by a 4–1 vote.

=== Israel ===
Rubin has criticized the use of the term "apartheid" towards Israel as antisemitic. In October 2023, amid the Gaza war, Rubin said he supported providing additional air missile defense systems for the Iron Dome, supporting humanitarian efforts in Palestine, and preventing escalation from Hezbollah and Iran. During his 2024 congressional campaign, he described himself as a "defender of Israel", but said he opposed the expansion of Israeli settlements in the West Bank as well as Israeli Prime Minister Benjamin Netanyahu's proposed judicial reforms. He also argued during the campaign that "criticism of the concept of the State of Israel ... is antisemitic" and bemoaned the perceived increase in use of the word Zionist as "a pejorative, a cuss word." In 2026, Rubin wrote in The Free Press that the Democratic Party, via its perceived diminishing support for Israel, was "turning against the Jews" and "actively fueling antisemitism in" the United States.

== Personal life ==
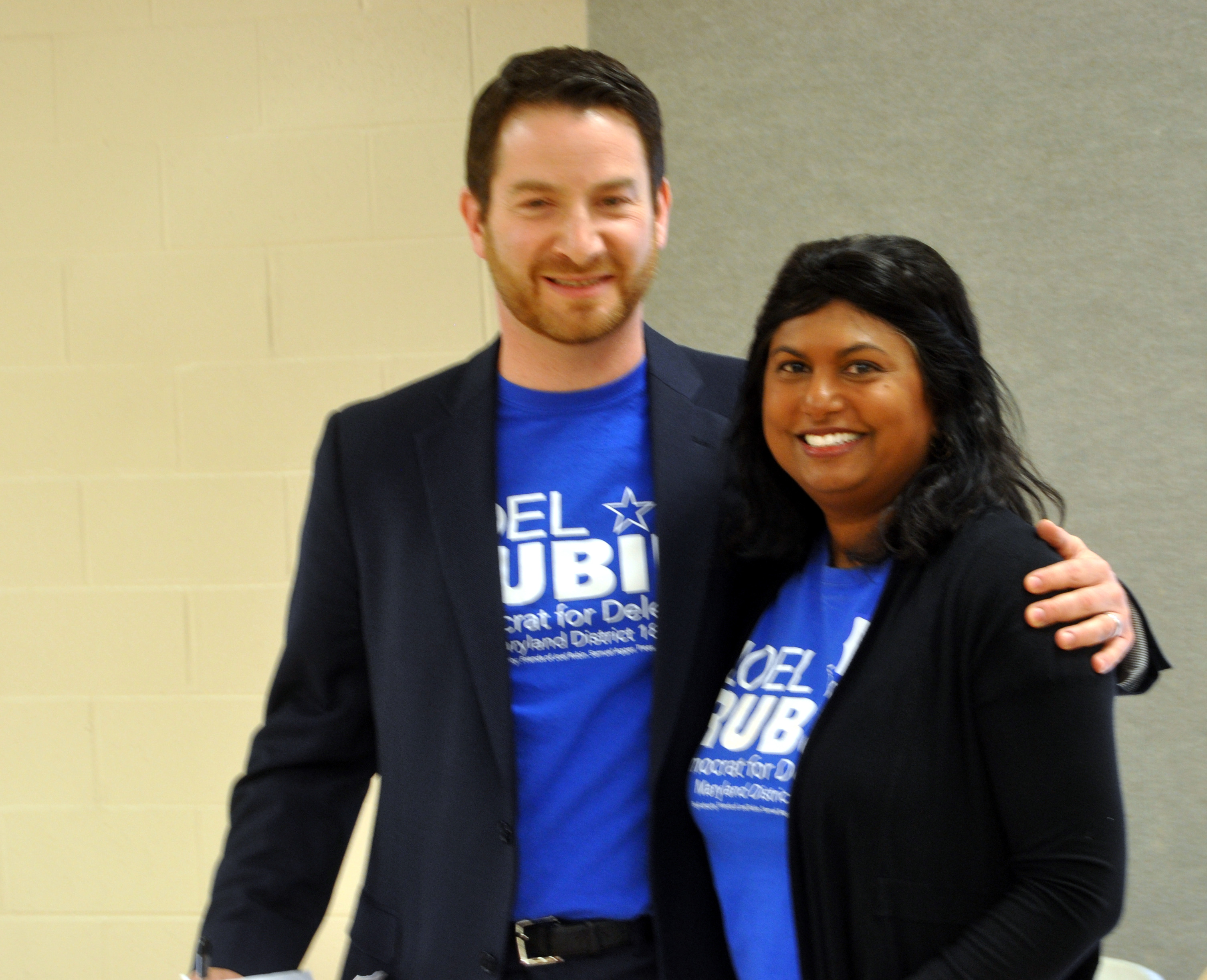
Rubin and his wife during his 2018 House of Delegates campaign

Rubin is married to his wife, Nilmini (née Gunaratne), whom he met at a going-away party for his college roommate in the spring of 2000. She is a Sri Lankan-American who works as a senior policy advisor for the House Foreign Affairs Committee and is a registered Republican. Together, they have three daughters and have lived in Montgomery County, Maryland since 2006. He is Jewish and a member of the Adas Israel Congregation.

== Electoral history ==
Maryland's 8th congressional district Democratic primary election, 2016
Party	Candidate	Votes	%
Democratic	Jamie Raskin	43,776	33.6
Democratic	David Trone	35,400	27.1
Democratic	Kathleen Matthews	31,186	23.9
Democratic	Ana Sol Gutierrez	7,185	5.5
Democratic	Will Jawando	6,058	4.6
Democratic	Kumar P. Barve	3,149	2.4
Democratic	David M. Anderson	1,511	1.2
Democratic	Joel Rubin	1,426	1.1
Democratic	Dan Bolling	712	0.5

Maryland House of Delegates District 18 Democratic primary election, 2018
Party	Candidate	Votes	%
Democratic	Al Carr (incumbent)	10,201	22.2
Democratic	Emily Shetty	9,024	19.6
Democratic	Jared Solomon	8,067	17.5
Democratic	Leslie Milano	6,510	14.2
Democratic	Joel Rubin	5,150	11.2
Democratic	Mila Johns	4,167	9.1
Democratic	Ron Franks	1,493	3.2
Democratic	Helga Luest	1,387	3.0
