= Jeff Waldstreicher =

American politician (born 1979)

- Waldstreicher in 2025

Member of the Maryland Senate from the 18th district
- Incumbent
- Assumed office January 9, 2019
- Preceded by: Richard Madaleno
- Constituency: Montgomery County

Member of the Maryland House of Delegates from the 18th district
- In office January 10, 2007 – January 9, 2019 Serving with Jane Lawton (2006–2007), Alfred C. Carr Jr. (2007–2019), Ana Sol Gutierrez
- Preceded by: Richard Madaleno
- Succeeded by: Jared Solomon

Personal details
- Born: December 31, 1979 (age 46) Silver Spring, Maryland, U.S.
- Party: Democratic
- Children: 3
- Education: Emory University (BA); UC Berkeley School of Law (JD)
- Occupation: Attorney
- Website: jeffwaldstreicher.com

Jeffrey D. Waldstreicher (born December 31, 1979) is an American politician from Maryland and a member of the Democratic Party. He is currently a member of the Maryland Senate, representing District 18 in Montgomery County after serving two terms in the Maryland House of Delegates.

== Early life and career ==
Waldstreicher was born in Silver Spring, Maryland, on December 31, 1979. He graduated from Montgomery Blair High School and later attended Emory University, where he graduated Phi Beta Kappa with a Bachelor of Arts degree in political science and history. He received a Juris Doctor degree from the University of California, Berkeley in 2003, where he was an editor for the California Law Review.

== In the legislature ==
Waldstreicher was sworn into the Maryland House of Delegates on January 10, 2007, where he served on the Judiciary Committee until 2015, and on the Economic Matters Committee from 2015 to 2019.

In July 2017, Waldstreicher announced his candidacy for the Maryland Senate in District 18, seeking to succeed state senator Richard Madaleno, who unsuccessfully ran for governor in 2018. Waldstriecher endorsed Madaleno in the gubernatorial primary, attending his campaign launch rally. In March 2018, he was accused of encouraging Helga Luest to run for his seat in the Maryland House of Delegates to make it harder for his primary challenger, Dana Beyer, to win the Democratic primary. Waldstreicher denied Luest's allegations in a statement sent to Bethesda Magazine, but did not comment further. His opponents also accused him of dodging candidate events, which Waldstreicher said he missed because of a sickness and legislative duties. Waldstreicher won the Democratic primary on June 26, 2018, defeating Beyer with 49.4 percent of the vote. He ran unopposed in the general election.

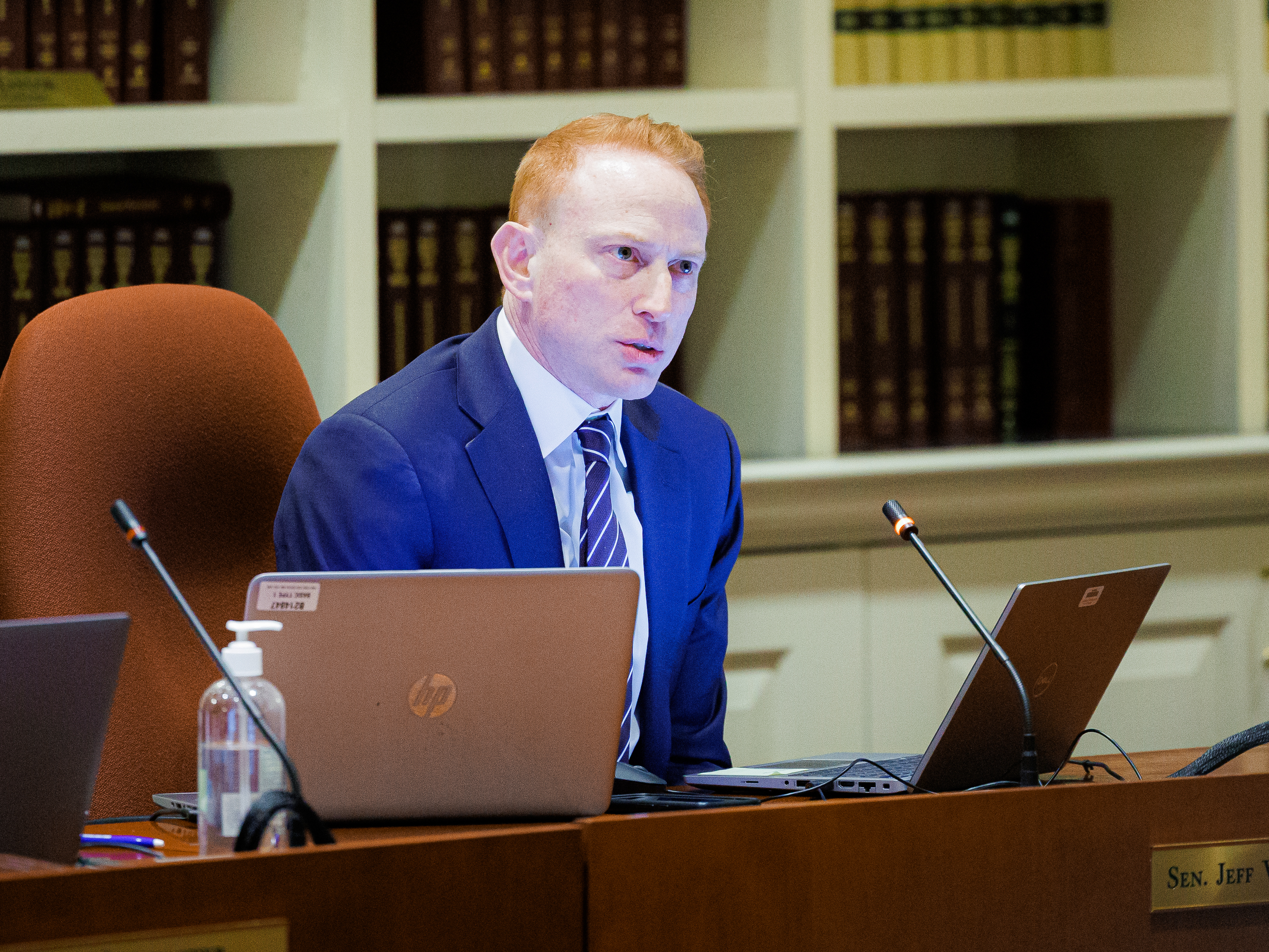
Waldstreicher in the Judicial Proceedings Committee, 2025

Waldstreicher was sworn into the Maryland Senate on January 9, 2019, where he serves as the vice-chair of the Judicial Proceedings Committee and the Chair of the Joint Committee on Federal Relations. In February 2019, President of the Maryland Senate Bill Ferguson appointed Waldstreicher to a work group to study legalizing recreational marijuana in the state.

Waldstreicher was a delegate to the 2024 Democratic National Convention, pledged to Kamala Harris.

== Political positions ==
=== Development initiatives ===
During the 2019 legislative session, Waldstreicher introduced a bill that would repeal the Maryland Court of Appeals' ruling in Dumbarton Improvement Association, Inc. v. Druid Ridge Cemetery Company, Inc., which blocked development at the Druid Ridge Cemetery in Baltimore County, Maryland. He withdrew the bill in March 2019 after The Baltimore Sun asked him questions about the measure, saying that he hadn't intended to get involved in a Baltimore County land-use issue. Waldstreicher later introduced a bill creating a state office to mediate lawsuits from workers with asbestos-related diseases, the bill unanimously passed the Maryland Senate and received a 96–36 vote in the Maryland House of Delegates, but did not become law.

=== Environment ===
During his tenure in the Maryland House of Delegates, Waldstreicher repeatedly introduced legislation that would block state subsidies from going to the Luke Mill, a paper mill that the state government had considered "green energy" despite it releasing carbon dioxide through the burning of black liquor.

=== Israel ===
In November 2023, Waldstreicher and eight other state senators signed a joint letter that threatened to defund immigrants rights group CASA de Maryland because it had called for an immediate ceasefire in the Gaza war and condemned the "utilization of US tax dollars to promote the ongoing violence." During the 2025 legislative session, Waldstreicher introduced legislation to ban "masked intimidation", citing the use of face coverings among anti-Israel protesters to obscure their identity and cause disturbances.

=== National politics ===
In September 2018, Waldstreicher signed a letter calling on local police and prosecutors in Montgomery County to investigate allegations that U.S. Supreme Court nominee Brett Kavanaugh had committed sexual assault while attending Georgetown Preparatory School in the 1980s. The county's chief of police and state's attorney said shortly after that they were "prepared to investigate any allegation, should a victim come forward."

In September 2019, Waldstreicher joined Baltimore, Gaithersburg, and a number of advocacy groups in a lawsuit against the Trump administration over its public charge rule toward granting green cards or permanent residency to certain immigrants using public benefits.

During the 2026 legislative session, Waldstreicher introduced the No Kings Act, which would allow Maryland residents to sue federal agents in state courts for violations of their constitutional rights.

=== Policing ===
During the 2021 legislative session, Waldstreicher introduced amendments to a bill repealing the state's Law Enforcement Officers' Bill of Rights, seeking to clarify portions of alterations made by state senator Michael A. Jackson. These amendments led to a car rally organized by the Silver Spring Justice Coalition and the Montgomery County Defund/Invest Coalition outside of Waldstreicher's home and calls for Waldstreicher to be removed as vice chair of the Judicial Proceedings Committee.

=== Social issues ===
In November 2007, Waldstreicher voted against a bill that would allow voters to decide whether to legalize slot machine gambling in Maryland. The bill passed the Maryland House of Delegates by a vote of 86–52.

In October 2012, Waldstreicher attended a fundraiser event for Marylanders for Marriage Equality, a group supporting Question 6 to legalize same-sex marriage in Maryland.

In March 2013, Waldstreicher voted for a bill to repeal the death penalty in Maryland. The bill passed the Maryland House of Delegates by a vote of 82–56.

During the 2014 legislative session, Waldstreicher introduced a bill that would require police to obtain a search warrant to use drones, email, cellphone towers, or license plate readers to track people. The bill was signed into law by Governor Martin O'Malley on April 14, 2014.

During the 2016 legislative session, Waldstreicher introduced a bill that would prohibit restaurants banning customers from posting negative reviews online.

During the 2020 legislative session, Waldstreicher introduced "Olivia's Law", a bill that would require colleges and universities to create plans to address the outbreak of infectious diseases. The bill was named after Olivia Paregol, a University of Maryland freshman who died in 2018 after contracting adenovirus. The bill passed both chambers unanimously and became law on May 8, 2020.

During the 2021 legislative session, Waldstreicher introduced the No Defense to Sexual Crimes Act, a bill that would repeal spousal privilege for sexual crimes. The bill passed both chambers by a unanimous vote in the Maryland Senate and a 115–18 vote in the Maryland House of Delegates, but failed to pass out of the General Assembly.

=== Transportation ===
Waldstreicher opposes the widening of Interstate 270 and the Capital Beltway.

During the 2022 legislative session, Waldstreicher introduced a bill prohibiting the state Motor Vehicle Administration from suspending motor vehicle registration as a penalty for toll violations.

=== Voting rights ===
During the 2019 legislative session, Waldstreicher introduced a bill that would allow eligible students to register to vote at high schools. The bill failed to pass out of the Committee on Education, Health, and Environmental Affairs.

== Personal life ==
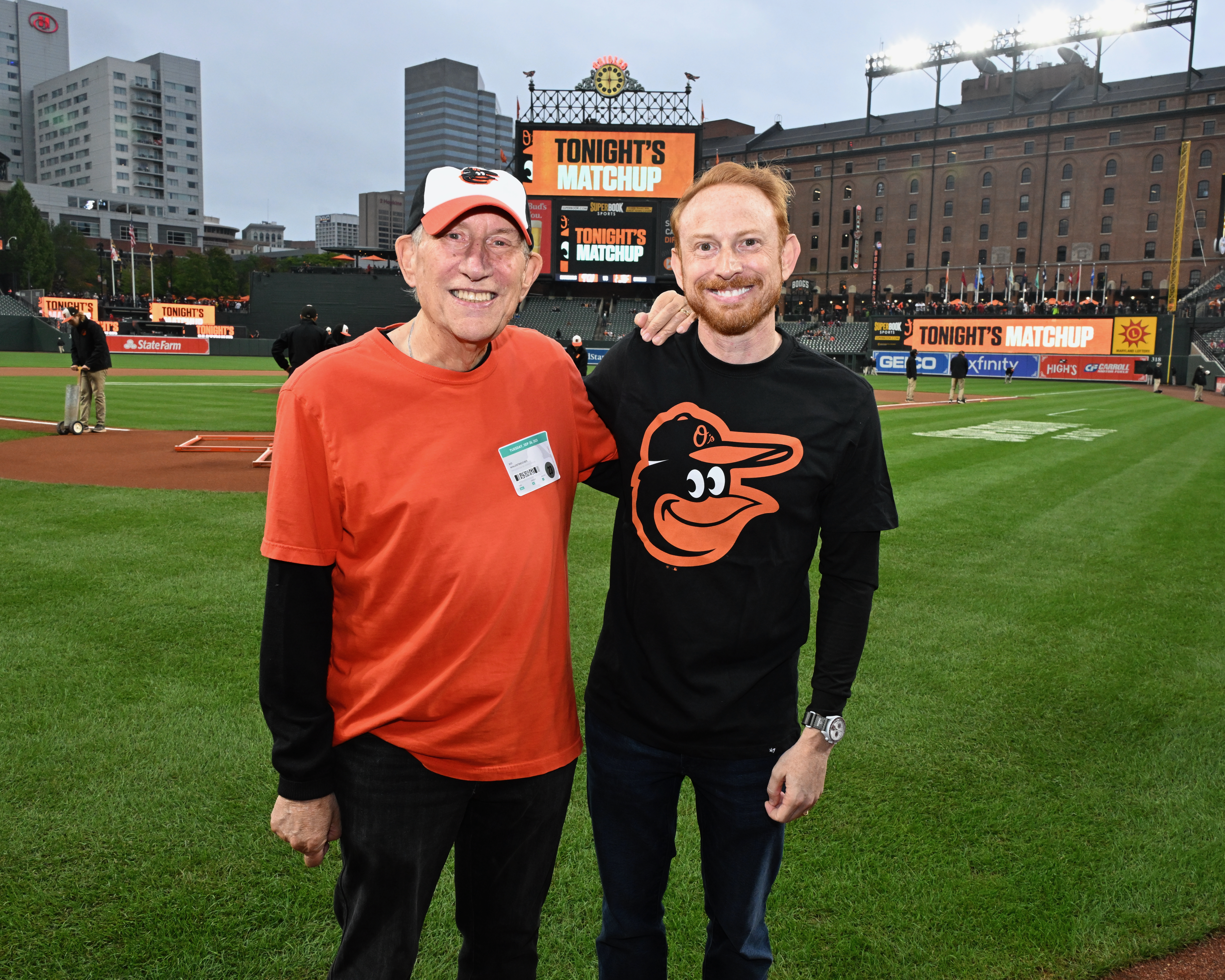
Waldstreicher and his father attending a Baltimore Orioles game, 2023

Waldstreicher is married. Together, he and his wife have three children and live in Kensington, Maryland. They are active members of Temple Shalom in Chevy Chase, where Waldstreicher served on the Social Justice Committee and as a substitute Hebrew School teacher. Waldstreicher is a fan of the Washington Commanders.

== Electoral history ==
Maryland House of Delegates District 18 Democratic primary election, 2006
Party	Candidate	Votes	%
Democratic	Jane Lawton	8,168	19.7
Democratic	Ana Sol Gutierrez	6,733	16.2
Democratic	Jeff Waldstreicher	6,345	15.3
Democratic	Daniel E. Farrington	5,898	14.2
Democratic	Dana Beyer	5,128	12.3
Democratic	James Browning	4,507	10.8
Democratic	Alfred C. Carr Jr.	3,468	8.3
Democratic	Noah Grosfeld-Katz	1,304	3.1

Maryland House of Delegates District 18 election, 2006
Party	Candidate	Votes	%
Democratic	Jane Lawton	26,994	25.9
Democratic	Ana Sol Gutierrez	26,751	25.6
Democratic	Jeff Waldstreicher	26,315	25.2
Republican	Joan Pleiman	8,137	7.8
Republican	Richard A. Fenati	8,134	7.8
Republican	Lorri D. Simmons	7,926	7.6
Write-in		134	0.1

Maryland House of Delegates District 18 Democratic primary election, 2010
Party	Candidate	Votes	%
Democratic	Ana Sol Gutierrez	7,879	24.1
Democratic	Jeff Waldstreicher	7,386	22.6
Democratic	Al Carr	6,756	20.7
Democratic	Dana Beyer	5,450	16.7
Democratic	Vanessa Atterbeary	4,247	13.0
Democratic	Michael K. Heney	932	2.9

Maryland House of Delegates District 18 election, 2010
Party	Candidate	Votes	%
Democratic	Al Carr	26,313	34.0
Democratic	Ana Sol Gutierrez	25,545	33.0
Democratic	Jeff Waldstreicher	24,822	32.0
Write-in		807	1.0

Maryland House of Delegates District 18 Democratic primary election, 2014
Party	Candidate	Votes	%
Democratic	Jeff Waldstreicher	7,303	21.6
Democratic	Ana Sol Gutierrez	7,181	21.3
Democratic	Al Carr	6,437	19.1
Democratic	Emily Shetty	3,859	11.4
Democratic	Rick Kessler	3,818	11.3
Democratic	Natali Fani-Gonzalez	2,758	8.2
Democratic	Elizabeth Matory	2,389	7.1

Maryland House of Delegates District 18 election, 2014
Party	Candidate	Votes	%
Democratic	Ana Sol Gutierrez	23,406	33.3
Democratic	Al Carr	23,353	33.2
Democratic	Jeff Waldstreicher	22,736	32.3
Write-in		868	1.2

Maryland Senate District 18 Democratic primary election, 2018
Party	Candidate	Votes	%
Democratic	Jeff Waldstreicher	8,695	49.4
Democratic	Dana Beyer	6,527	37.0
Democratic	Michelle Carhart	2,396	13.6

Maryland Senate District 18 election, 2018
Party	Candidate	Votes	%
Democratic	Jeff Waldstreicher	41,360	97.6
Write-in		1,009	2.4

Maryland Senate District 18 Democratic primary election, 2022
Party	Candidate	Votes	%
Democratic	Jeff Waldstreicher	12,117	63.8
Democratic	Max Socol	6,527	36.2

Maryland Senate District 18 election, 2022
Party	Candidate	Votes	%
Democratic	Jeff Waldstreicher	34,169	82.8
Republican	Missy Carr	6,935	16.8
Write-in		162	0.4
