= Aaron Kaufman (politician) =

American politician (born 1987)

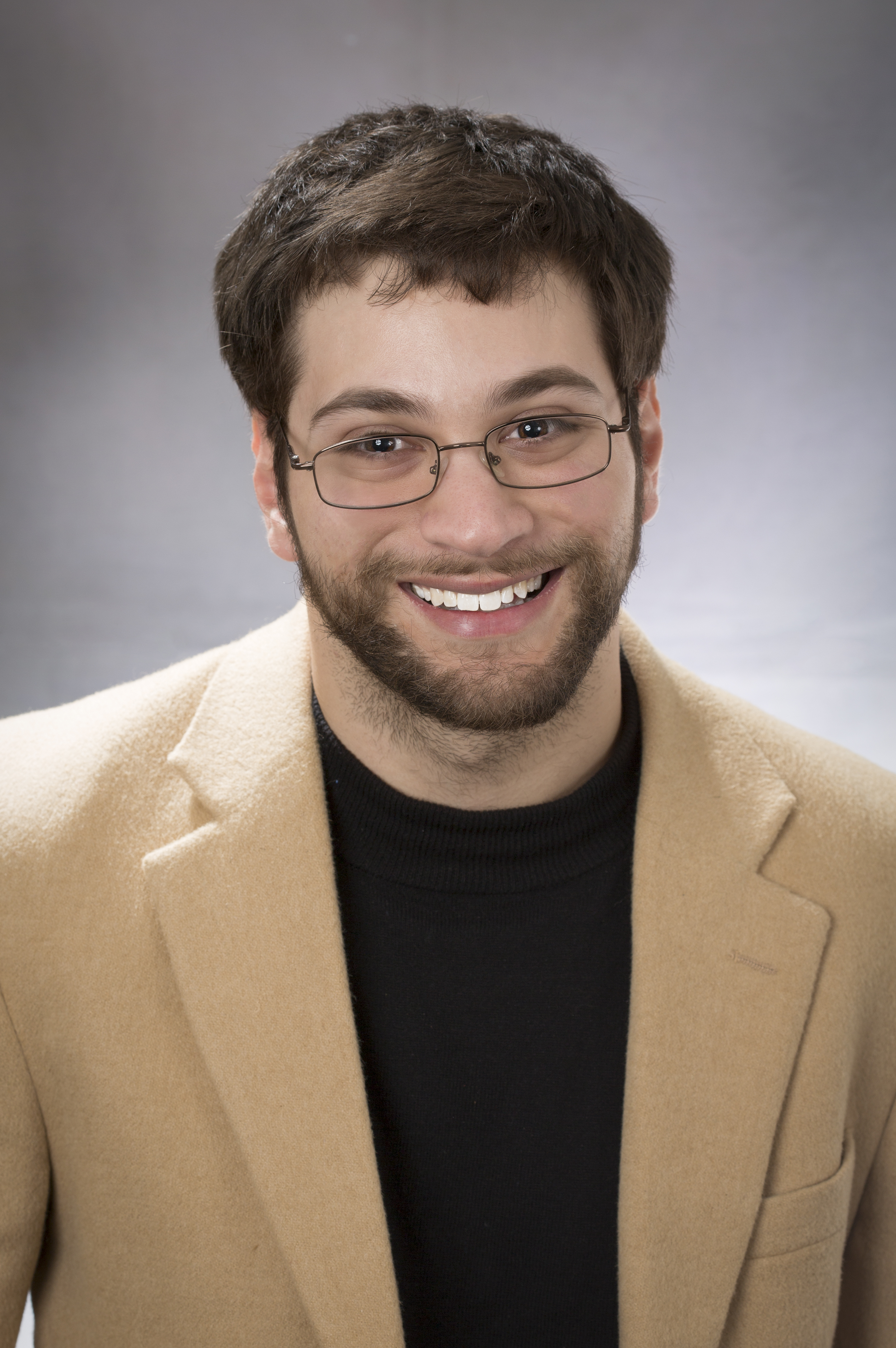
- Kaufman in 2014

Member of the Maryland House of Delegates from the 18th district
- Incumbent
- Assumed office January 11, 2023 Serving with Emily Shetty and Jared Solomon
- Preceded by: Al Carr

Personal details
- Born: February 15, 1987 (age 39)
- Party: Democratic
- Education: Montgomery College (AA); University of Maryland, College Park (BA)
- Aaron Kaufman's voice Aaron Kaufman on challenges faced by people with disabilities Recorded March 10, 2023

Aaron M. Kaufman (born February 15, 1987) is an American politician and disability rights advocate. A member of the Democratic Party, he is a member of the Maryland House of Delegates for District 18 in Montgomery County. Kaufman has cerebral palsy, and is the first member of the Maryland General Assembly with a physical disability.

== Background ==
Kaufman graduated from Walter Johnson High School. He attended Montgomery College, where he received an associate degree in general studies in 2009, and the University of Maryland, College Park, where he received a Bachelor of Arts degree in American studies in 2011.

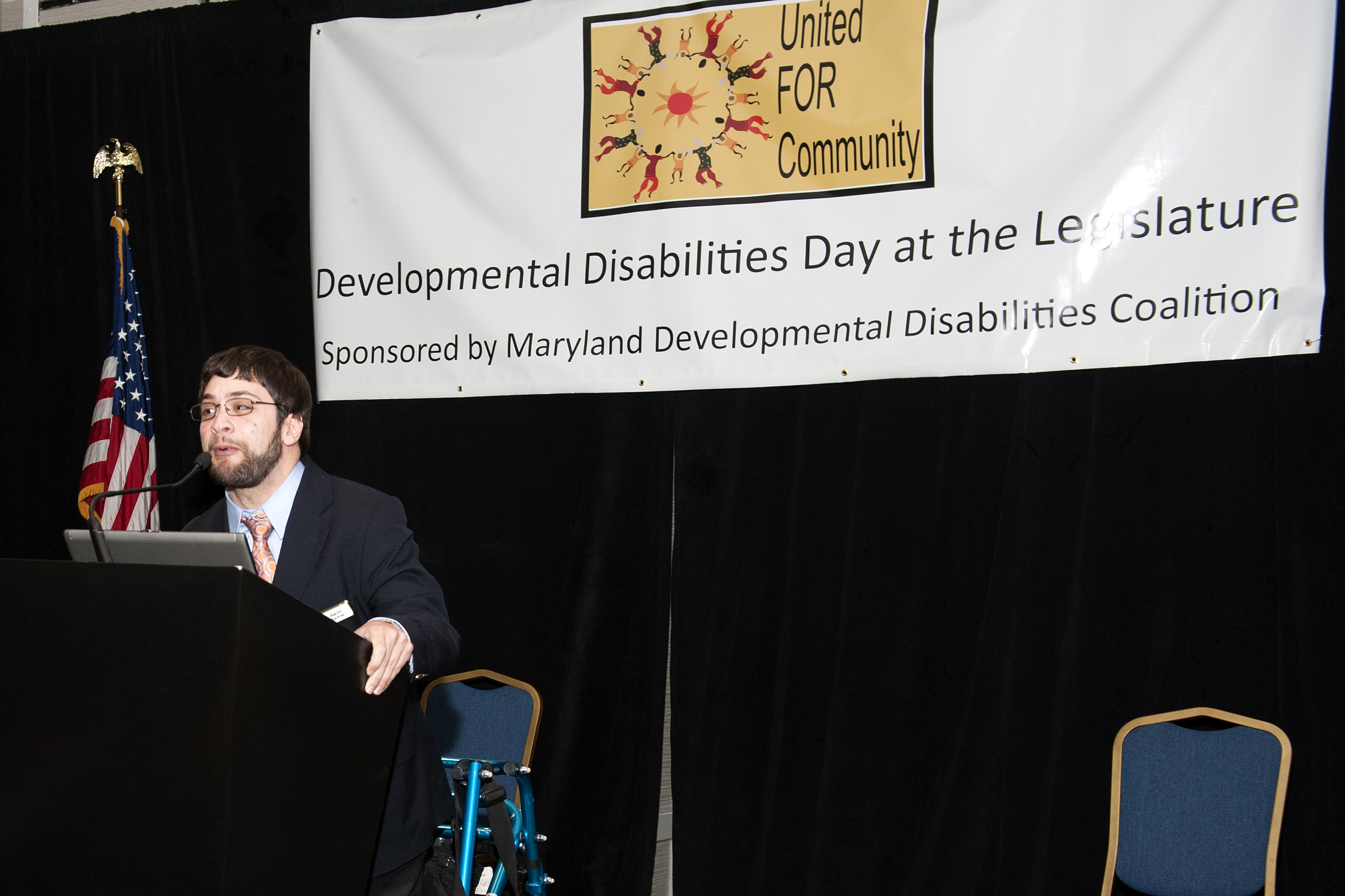
Kaufman speaking in 2014

Kaufman previously served as an administrative assistant for the Maryland House Ways and Means Committee. He is a long-time member of the Maryland Developmental Disabilities Council and RespectAbility, and has worked on campaigns at several levels of government. He also served as a senior manager of legislative affairs at the Jewish Federations of North America.

In 2014, Kaufman was elected to the Montgomery County Central Committee and served through December 2022.

On April 19, 2022, Kaufman applied to run for the Maryland House of Delegates in District 18, seeking to replace state Delegate Al Carr on the ballot after Carr withdrew his candidacy hours before the candidate filing deadline on April 15 to run for the county council, and no candidates were able to file to run in his place before the deadline. On April 20, the Montgomery County Democratic Central Committee voted to nominate him to run in the district. Kaufman, along with state Delegates Emily Shetty and Jared Solomon, faced Republican George Cecala in the general election.

== In the legislature ==
Kaufman was sworn into the Maryland House of Delegates on January 11, 2023. He is a member of the House Judiciary Committee.

== Political positions ==
=== Climate change ===
In May 2022, Kaufman signed a Chesapeake Climate Action Network pledge to support legislation to get Maryland to use 100 percent carbon-free electricity by 2035 and to remove trash incineration from the state's "clean energy" classification.

=== Disability rights ===
While working at the Jewish Federations of North America, Kaufman pushed for legislation that would offer more financial security to people with disabilities, including the ABLE Age Adjustment Act (S.331) and the Savings Penalty Elimination Act (S.4102). In July 2011, Kaufman attended a Barack Obama rally at the University of Maryland, College Park to urge the president to protect disability funding in budgetary negotiations with Congress.

During the 2025 legislative session, Kaufman introduced a bill that would give people the right to repair their own motorized wheelchairs. The bill passed and was signed into law by Governor Wes Moore.

During the 2026 legislative session, Kaufman introduced legislation that would require police training for situations involving elopement. He also supported a bill that would allow parents of children with disabilities to share the use of tracking devices with their child's school so that school administrators could help find a child in the case of elopement.

=== Immigration ===
In November 2025, Kaufman supported a bill to ban 287(g) program agreements in Maryland, saying that it would allow local police to focus on community-based policing instead of federal immigration enforcement.

=== Taxes ===
In February 2011, Kaufman joined more than 100 disabilities advocates in a rally at the Maryland State House calling on the legislature to raise the state's alcohol tax. The alcohol tax bill was signed into law by Governor Martin O'Malley on May 19, 2011.

In April 2022, Kaufman said he supported creating combined reporting for corporate taxes.

=== Voting rights ===
In April 2022, Kaufman said he supported establishing other mechanisms of filling vacancies in the Maryland General Assembly, such as special elections. Currently, under Maryland law, the only way to fill such a vacancy is through nomination by local central committees.

== Electoral history ==
Montgomery County Democratic Central Committee District 18 election, 2014
Party	Candidate	Votes	%
Democratic	Aaron M. Kaufman	7,989	50.2
Democratic	Alan Banov	7,916	49.8

Montgomery County Democratic Central Committee District 18 election, 2018
Party	Candidate	Votes	%
Democratic	Aaron M. Kaufman	7,945	70.0
Democratic	Michael Tardif	3,407	30.0

Maryland House of Delegates District 18 Democratic primary election, 2022
Party	Candidate	Votes	%
Democratic	Emily Shetty	15,747	34.5
Democratic	Jared Solomon	15,239	33.4
Democratic	Aaron M. Kaufman	14,698	32.2

Maryland House of Delegates District 18 election, 2022
Party	Candidate	Votes	%
Democratic	Emily Shetty	32,621	30.98
Democratic	Aaron M. Kaufman	30,860	29.31
Democratic	Jared Solomon	30,711	29.17
Republican	George M. Cecala	7,390	7.02
Green	Jon Foreman	3,422	3.25
Write-in		292	0.28
