= Emily Shetty =

American politician (born 1984)

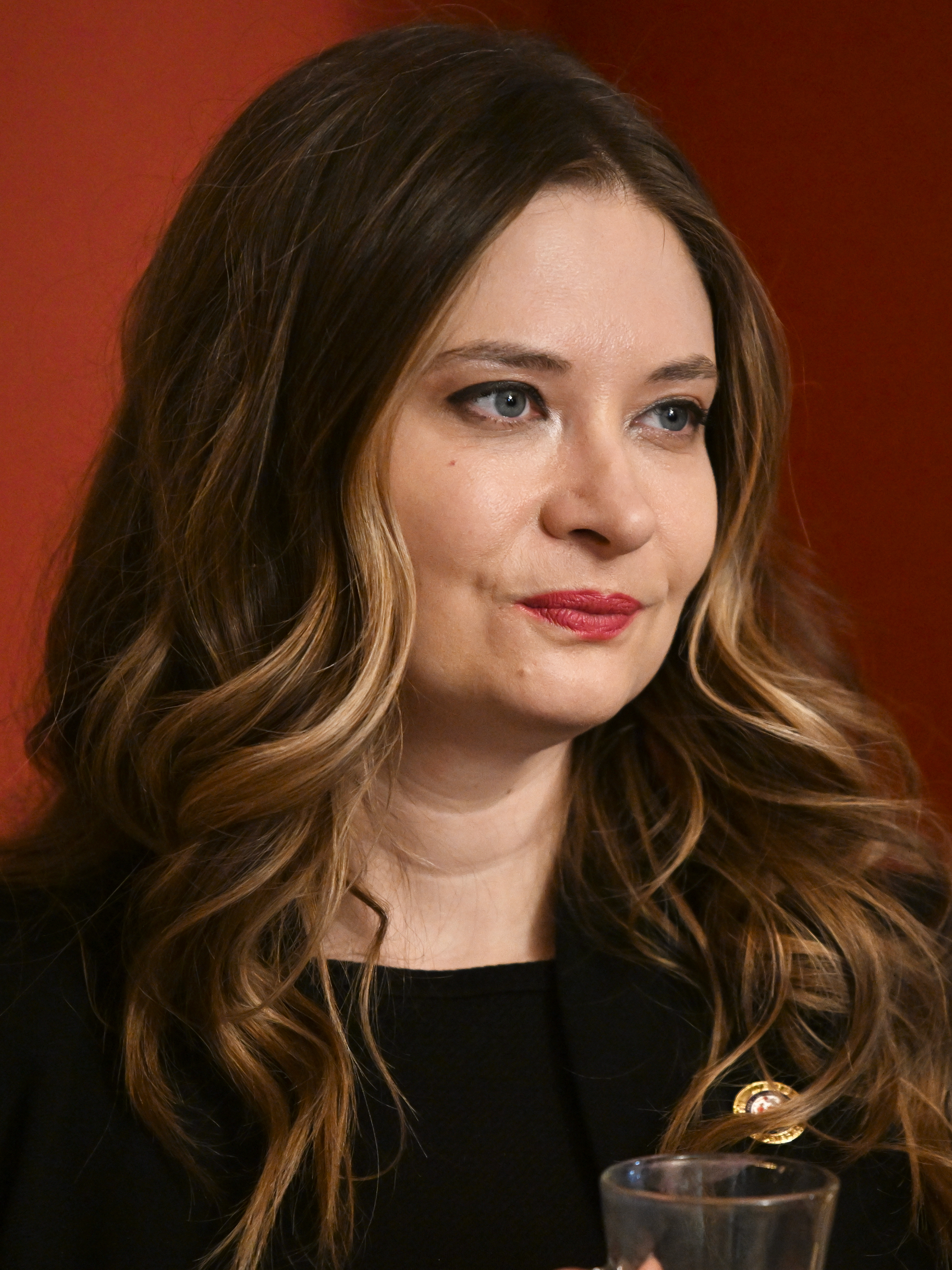

Member of the Maryland House of Delegates from the 18th district
- Incumbent
- Assumed office January 9, 2019 Serving with Aaron Kaufman, Jared Solomon
- Preceded by: Ana Sol Gutierrez

Personal details
- Born: January 11, 1984 (age 42) Fairfax, Virginia, U.S.
- Party: Democratic
- Spouse: Ash Shetty
- Children: 1
- Education: Duke University (BA); Catholic University (JD)

Emily Khoury Shetty (born January 11, 1984) is an American politician and attorney who has served as a member of the Maryland House of Delegates representing District 18 since 2019.

== Early life and education ==
Shetty was born in Fairfax, Virginia, on January 11, 1984. Her mother immigrated to the United States from Bulgaria and raised Shetty and her sister as a single mother. She was raised in High Point, North Carolina, where she worked at her local library when she was nine years old and later volunteered with Big Brothers Big Sisters of America. Shetty earned her Bachelor of Arts degree from Duke University in 2005, attended the Columbus School of Law, and earned her J.D. degree from the Catholic University of America in 2008. She was admitted to the Maryland Bar in 2009.

== Political career ==
After graduating from Catholic University, Shetty worked for U.S. Representative Edolphus Towns until 2012, first as a legislative assistant and then as his legislative director. From 2012 to 2014, she worked as the senior director of legislative affairs with the Leukemia & Lymphoma Society, afterwards working as a consultant for lobbyist groups Stanton Park Group and Horizon Government Affairs. In 2020, she started her own lobbying firm, Step Up Advocacy.

From 2013 to 2014, and again from 2015 to 2018, Shetty was a member of the Montgomery County Democratic Central Committee. In 2014, she unsuccessfully ran for the Maryland House of Delegates in District 18, receiving 11 percent of the vote behind incumbents Ana Sol Gutierrez, Jeff Waldstreicher, and Al Carr. Shetty ran again in 2018 after Waldstreicher announced he would run for the Maryland Senate, winning the Democratic primary with 19.7 percent of the vote and defeating Republican challenger Linda Willard in the general election with 30 percent of the vote.

=== Maryland House of Delegates ===
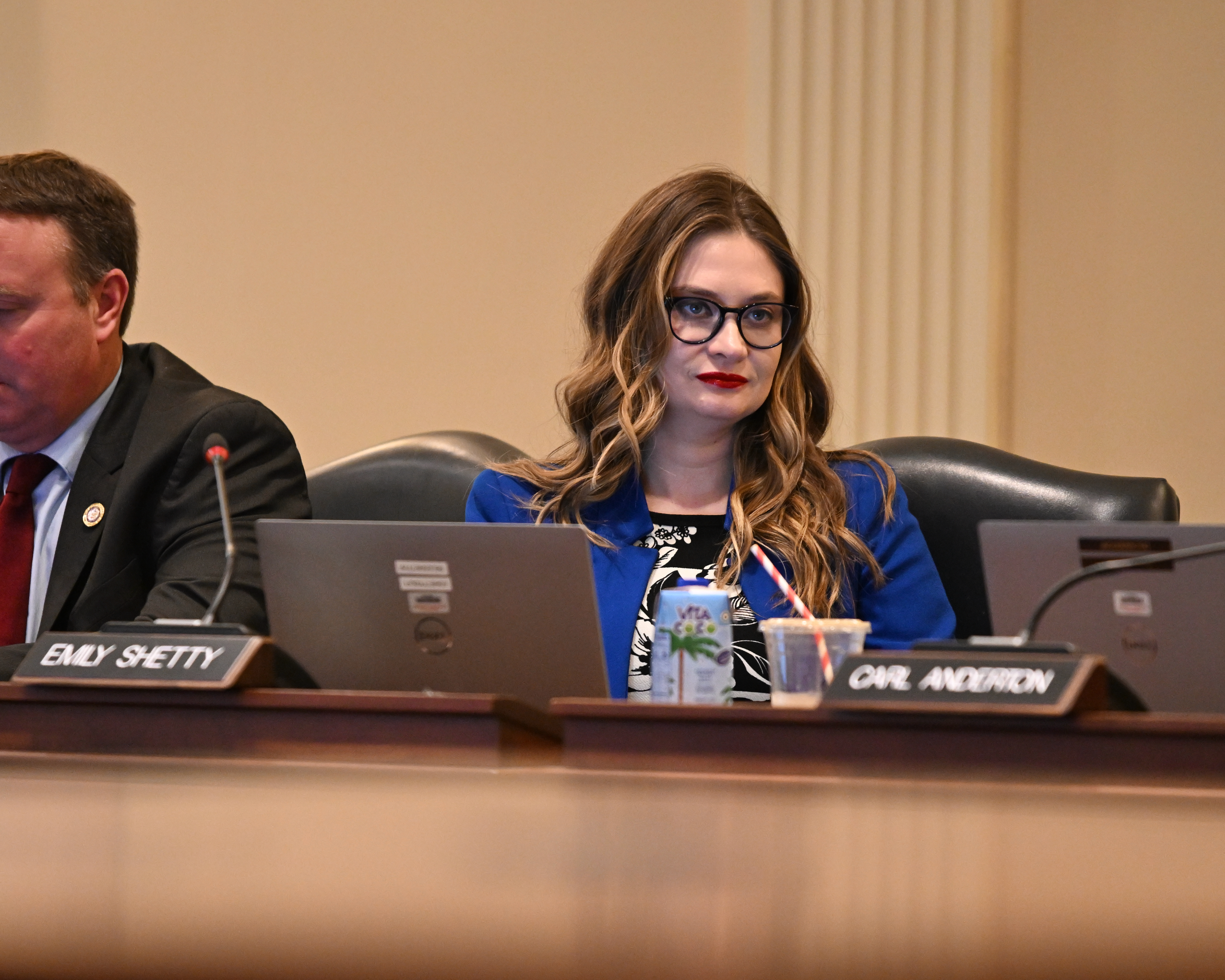
Shetty in the House Appropriations Committee, 2023

Shetty was sworn into the House of Delegates on January 9, 2019. She was a member of the Judiciary Committee from 2019 to 2022, afterwards serving in the Appropriations Committee. From 2023 to 2027, Shetty served as the chair of the House Democratic Caucus.

During the 2020 Democratic Party presidential primaries, Shetty ran as a delegate to the Democratic National Convention, not pledged to any candidate.

== Political positions ==
=== Health care ===
During her 2014 House of Delegates campaign, Shetty said she supported increasing state investments in mental health care.

During the 2021 legislative session, Shetty introduced legislation that would allow pharmacists to switch name brands. The bill passed and became law.

In 2022, Shetty introduced a bill that would allow organ donors to decide whether their organs would be donated to research or a surgical transplant. The bill unanimously passed the Maryland General Assembly and became law.

=== Minimum wage ===
Shetty supports indexing the state minimum wage to inflation.

=== Policing ===
During the 2019 legislative session, Shetty introduced the Law Enforcement Trust and Transparency Act, which would establish statewide standards for officer-involved death investigations.

In 2021, Shetty introduced a bill to limit how police could use genealogy websites and their databases. The bill passed and became law without Governor Larry Hogan's signature.

=== Social issues ===
During the 2021 legislative session, Shetty introduced legislation that would allow transgender people to change their names without having to advertise it in a newspaper. The bill passed and became law.

In 2022, Shetty supported legislation to raise the state's minimum marriage age to 17 years old. She also supported the Abortion Care Access Act, which provided $3.5 million toward clinical reproductive services training for health care professionals.

In February 2026, Shetty spoke at a rally against proposed funding cuts to the Developmental Disabilities Administration, where she encouraged rallygoers to speak up more about the cuts and pledged to work with lawmakers and the governor to "try and make sure that we can do everything we can do support every single one of you as you continue to live your best lives".

=== Transportation ===
Shetty supports the Purple Line.

== Personal life ==
Shetty is married to her husband, Ash Shetty. Together, they live in Kensington, Maryland, and have one child. She has a chronic autoimmune disorder.

== Electoral history ==
Maryland House of Delegates District 18 Democratic primary election, 2014
Party	Candidate	Votes	%
Democratic	Jeff Waldstreicher (incumbent)	7,303	21.6
Democratic	Ana Sol Gutierrez (incumbent)	7,181	21.3
Democratic	Alfred C. Carr Jr. (incumbent)	6,437	19.1
Democratic	Emily Shetty	3,859	11.4
Democratic	Rick Kessler	3,818	11.3
Democratic	Natali Fani-Gonzalez	2,758	8.2
Democratic	Elizabeth Matory	2,389	7.1

Maryland House of Delegates District 18 Democratic primary election, 2018
Party	Candidate	Votes	%
Democratic	Al Carr (incumbent)	10,201	22.2
Democratic	Emily Shetty	9,024	19.6
Democratic	Jared Solomon	8,067	17.5
Democratic	Leslie Milano	6,510	14.2
Democratic	Joel Martin Rubin	5,150	11.2
Democratic	Mila Johns	4,167	9.1
Democratic	Ron Franks	1,493	3.2
Democratic	Helga Luest	1,387	3.0

Maryland House of Delegates District 18 election, 2018
Party	Candidate	Votes	%
Democratic	Emily Shetty	36,284	30.4
Democratic	Al Carr (incumbent)	35,988	30.1
Democratic	Jared Solomon	33,476	28.0
Republican	Linda Willard	9,836	8.2
Green	Jon Cook	3,547	3.0
Write-in		417	0.3

Maryland House of Delegates District 18 election, 2022
Party	Candidate	Votes	%
Democratic	Emily Shetty (incumbent)	32,621	30.98
Democratic	Aaron Kaufman	30,860	29.31
Democratic	Jared Solomon (incumbent)	30,711	29.17
Republican	George M. Cecala	7,390	7.02
Green	Jon Foreman	3,422	3.25
Write-in		292	0.28
