= Jared Solomon (Maryland politician) =

American politician (born 1985)

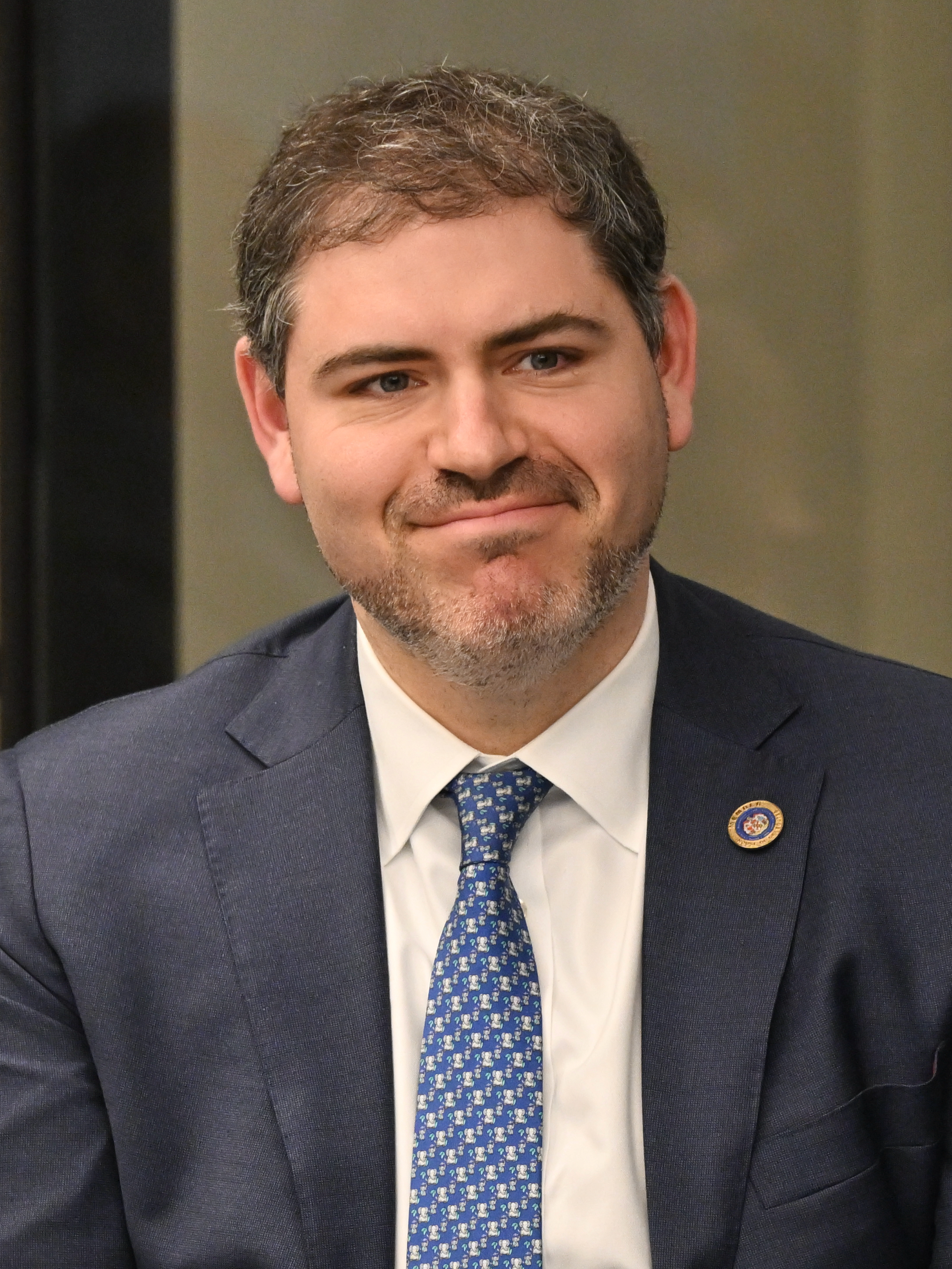
- Solomon in 2023

Member of the Maryland House of Delegates from the 18th district
- Incumbent
- Assumed office January 9, 2019 Serving with Aaron Kaufman and Emily Shetty
- Preceded by: Jeff Waldstreicher

Personal details
- Born: April 3, 1985 (age 41) Philadelphia, Pennsylvania, U.S.
- Party: Democratic
- Children: 2
- Education: University of Pittsburgh (BA); Johns Hopkins University (MA)
- Website: Campaign website
- Jared Solomon's voice Jared Solomon on his experience with teaching and standardized testing Recorded October 11, 2024

Jared Scott Solomon (born April 3, 1985) is an American politician from the Democratic Party and is a member of the Maryland House of Delegates representing District 18.

== Early life and career ==
Solomon was born on April 3, 1985, and raised in suburban Philadelphia. He attended the University of Pittsburgh, where he received a Bachelor of Arts degree in political science, history, and economics, and Johns Hopkins University, where he received a Master of Arts in teaching. Solomon also attended one semester at the London School of Economics. After graduating, he taught social studies at Northwestern High School until 2009, after which he worked as a project coordinator for the District of Columbia Public Schools. From 2011 to 2013, he worked as a senior policy director for First Focus, afterwards working as a policy advisor to U.S. Senator Bob Casey Jr. until 2018, when he resigned to run for the Maryland House of Delegates. In this capacity, Solomon worked on immigration, LGBT, and education policy and was the lead staff negotiator on the reauthorization of the Elementary and Secondary Education Act.

== In the legislature ==
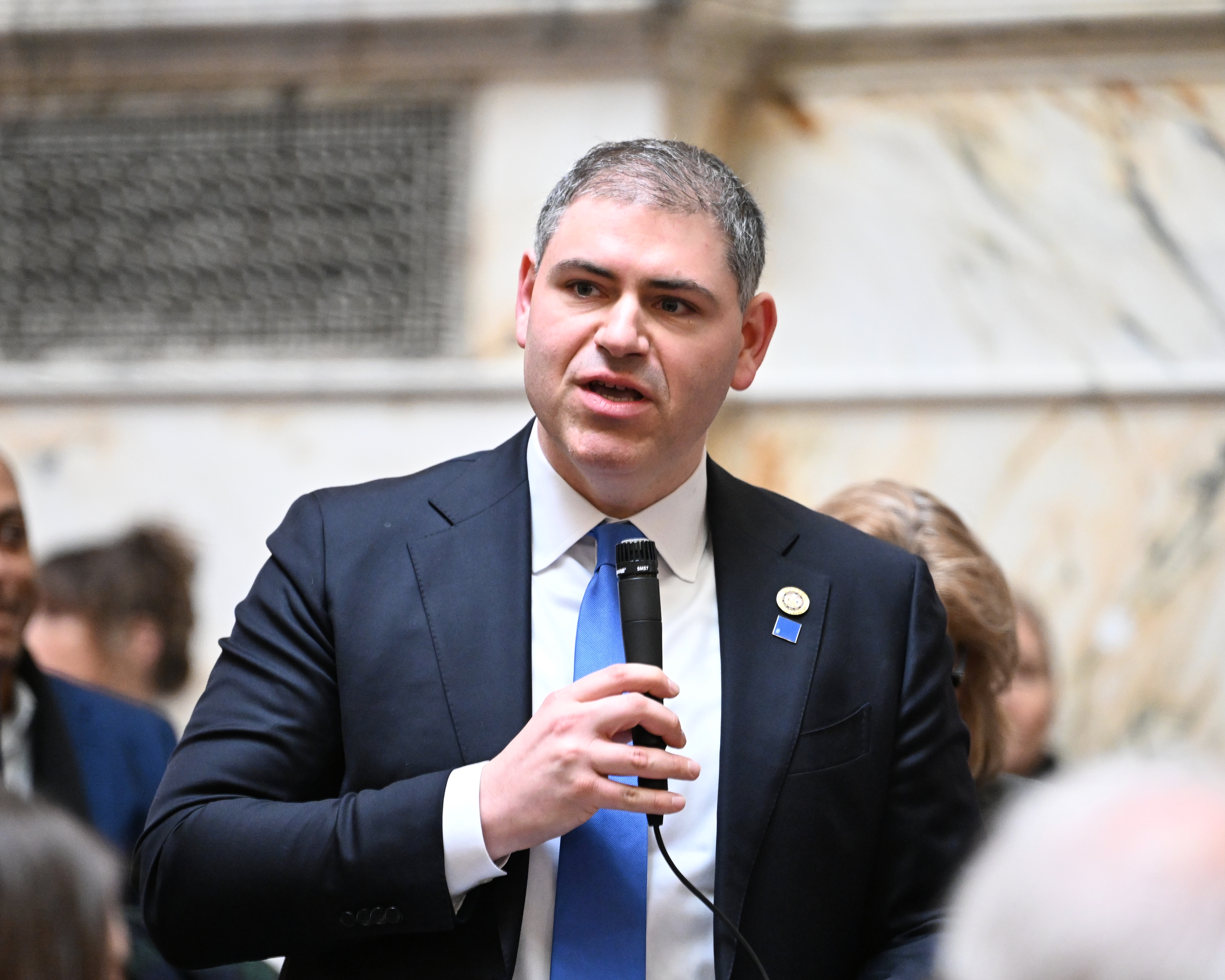
Solomon in the Maryland House of Delegates, 2025

Solomon was elected to the Maryland House of Delegates in 2018, and sworn in on January 9, 2019. He has been a member of the Appropriations Committee during his entire tenure. He is also a member of the Maryland Transit Caucus and an associate member of the Maryland Legislative Latino Caucus and Women Legislators of Maryland.

During the 2020 Democratic Party presidential primaries, Solomon ran for delegate to the Democratic National Convention pledged to Pete Buttigieg. In the presidential general election, he canvassed for Democratic nominee Joe Biden in North Wales, Pennsylvania.

In January 2024, Solomon, along with state senator Shelly Hettleman and 20 other Jewish lawmakers, created the Maryland Jewish Legislative Caucus.

== Political positions ==
=== Environment ===
During the 2019 legislative session, Solomon introduced a bill providing $30 million to schools for water remediation efforts to reduce lead levels in drinking water to 5 million parts per million, which passed and became law. In 2021, he introduced legislation to encourage school systems to adopt renewable energy to reduce greenhouse gas emissions, and another requiring schools with lead levels higher than 5 million parts per million to make remedial repairs by summer 2022.

=== Gun policy ===
In June 2022, following mass shootings in Uvalde, Texas, and Buffalo, New York, Solomon attended a March for our Lives protest in Wheaton, Maryland, where he called on Congress to pass gun safety legislation.

=== Housing ===
During the 2023 legislative session and following an apartment fire that killed one, Solomon supported legislation requiring high-rise buildings to install automatic smoke alarms in public corridors.

=== Israel ===
In November 2023, Solomon was one of 19 Jewish members of the Maryland General Assembly to sign onto a letter condemning a statement released by CASA de Maryland calling for an immediate ceasefire in the Gaza war.

=== Labor ===
During the 2021 legislative session, Solomon introduced a bill to consolidate the collective bargaining process within the University System of Maryland, which passed and became law after legislators overrode Governor Larry Hogan's veto on it. In October 2023, he participated a rally organized by SEIU 32BJ union workers to support collective bargaining efforts between the union and the Washington Service Contractors Association.

=== Redistricting ===
In August 2025, amid Republican efforts to redraw Texas's congressional districts to gain five congressional seats in the 2026 United States House of Representatives elections, Solomon said he opposed mid-decade redistricting, called for federal redistricting regulations, and accused President Donald Trump of trying to "steal the midterm elections". He also supported Maryland redrawing its congressional districts in response to Texas's mid-decade redistricting.

=== Social issues ===
During the 2019 legislative session, Solomon introduced legislation to establish an independent inspector for the Montgomery County Public Schools system, which passed and became law.

In July 2022, Solomon attended a rally at the Kensington Library to prevent disruptions to the library's Drag Queen Story Hour event. During the 2023 legislative session, he introduced legislation that would require single-occupancy bathrooms to use gender-neutral language.

=== Transportation ===
Solomon opposes the state's Interstate 270 and Capital Beltway highway widening plan and has criticized its use of public–private partnerships and high-occupancy toll lanes to fund it, calling it a "bait-and-switch". In December 2019, he was one of 80 lawmakers to cosign a letter calling on Governor Larry Hogan to postpone the project's first phase in December 2019. During the 2020 legislative session, Solomon introduced legislation to increase the state's financial oversight over public–private partnerships and allow the Maryland General Assembly to remove public–private partnership status from state projects. The bill was reintroduced in 2021. In July 2021, Solomon participated in a rally calling on members of the National Capital Region Transportation Planning Board to not include the highway expansion projects in its environmental studies, which would prevent the projects from getting the "environmental seal of approval" needed for the state to start construction.

In 2020, Solomon introduced a bill that would require the Maryland Department of Transportation to launch a memorandum of understanding process to form a regional rail service with Washington, D.C. and Virginia, which passed but was vetoed by Governor Hogan. During the 2021 legislative session, he introduced legislation to establish a regional rail system integrating commuter rail lines in Maryland, Virginia, and Washington, D.C. The bill was reintroduced in 2022.

In December 2023, Solomon expressed dissatisfaction with Governor Wes Moore's proposed $3.3 billion in cuts to the state's transportation fund, saying that the cuts were "a penny wise and a pound foolish".

== Personal life ==
Solomon is married and has two children. He is Jewish. He is a fan of the Philadelphia Eagles.

== Electoral history ==
Maryland House of Delegates District 18 Democratic primary election, 2018
Party	Candidate	Votes	%
Democratic	Al Carr (incumbent)	10,201	22.2
Democratic	Emily Shetty	9,024	19.6
Democratic	Jared Solomon	8,067	17.5
Democratic	Leslie Milano	6,510	14.2
Democratic	Joel Martin Rubin	5,150	11.2
Democratic	Mila Johns	4,167	9.1
Democratic	Ron Franks	1,493	3.2
Democratic	Helga Luest	1,387	3.0

Maryland House of Delegates District 18 election, 2018
Party	Candidate	Votes	%
Democratic	Emily Shetty	36,284	30.4
Democratic	Al Carr (incumbent)	35,988	30.1
Democratic	Jared Solomon	33,476	28.0
Republican	Linda Willard	9,836	8.2
Green	Jon Cook	3,547	3.0
Write-in		417	0.3

Maryland House of Delegates District 18 election, 2022
Party	Candidate	Votes	%
Democratic	Emily Shetty (incumbent)	32,621	31.0
Democratic	Aaron Kaufman	30,860	29.3
Democratic	Jared Solomon (incumbent)	30,711	29.2
Republican	George M. Cecala	7,390	7.0
Green	Jon Foreman	3,422	3.3
Write-in		292	0.3
