= Richard Madaleno =

American politician (born 1965)

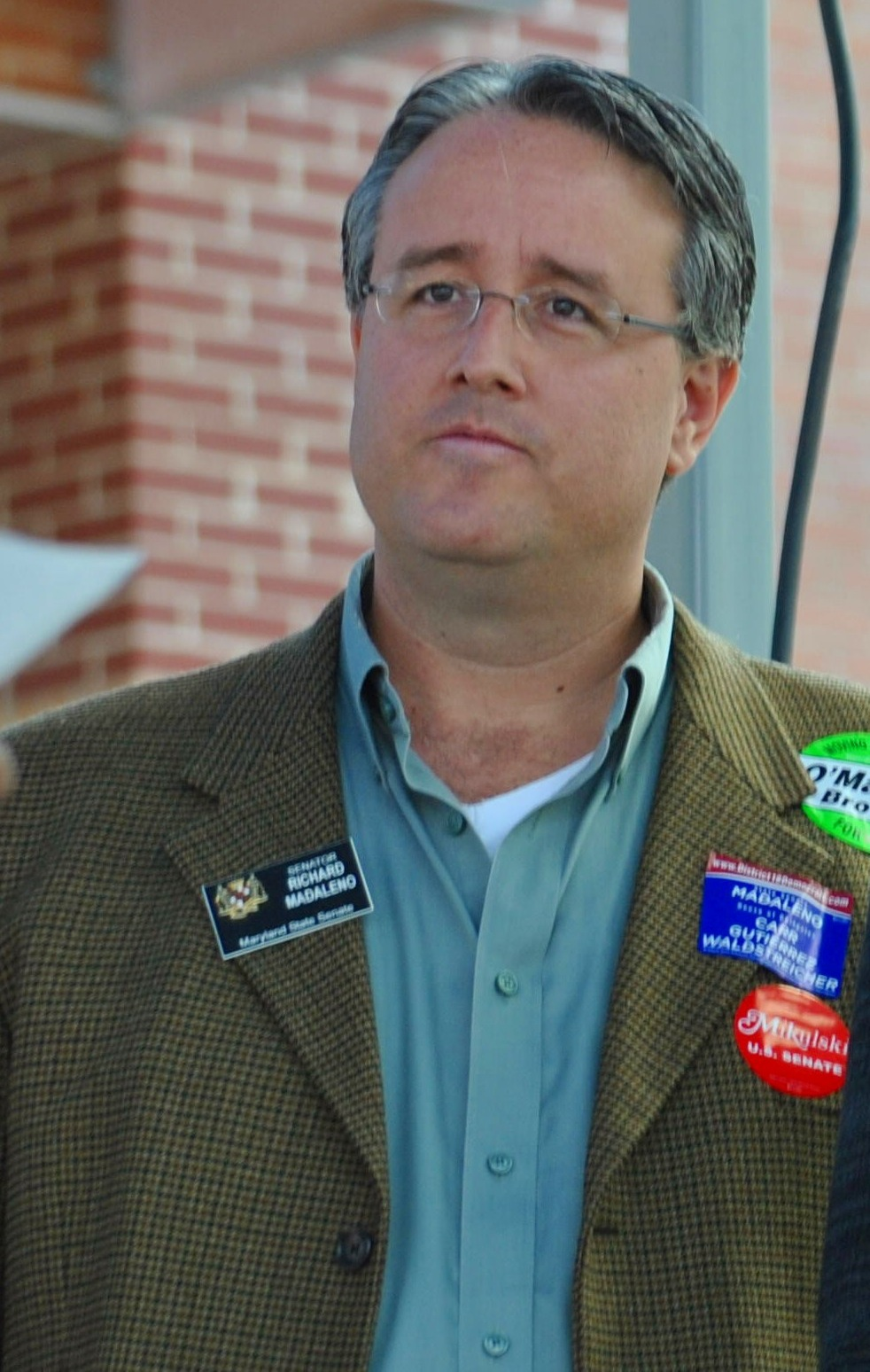

Member of the Maryland Senate from the 18th district
- In office January 10, 2007 – January 9, 2019
- Preceded by: Sharon Grosfeld
- Succeeded by: Jeff Waldstreicher

Member of the Maryland House of Delegates from the 18th district
- In office January 8, 2003 – January 10, 2007
- Succeeded by: Jeff Waldstreicher

Personal details
- Born: Richard Stuart Madaleno Jr. June 16, 1965 (age 61) Fort Lauderdale, Florida, U.S.
- Party: Democratic
- Spouse: Mark Madaleno
- Education: Syracuse University (BA, MPA)
- Richard Madaleno's voice Richard Madaleno on the American Rescue Plan Act of 2021; Recorded June 3, 2021

Richard Stuart Madaleno Jr., commonly known as Rich Madaleno (born June 16, 1965), is an American politician from Maryland. A Democrat, he was a member of the Maryland State Senate, representing the state's 18th district in Montgomery County, which includes Wheaton and Kensington, as well as parts of Silver Spring, Bethesda and Chevy Chase. Madaleno served as chair of the Montgomery County Senate Delegation from 2008 to 2011. He previously served four years in the House of Delegates.

On July 17, 2017, Madaleno ran for the Democratic nomination for the 2018 Maryland gubernatorial election.

== Background ==
Growing up in Silver Spring, Madaleno was educated at Montgomery County public schools and Georgetown Preparatory School. He then went to Syracuse University where he earned a Bachelor of Arts in 1987 and a Master of Public Administration in 1989.

On leaving university, Madaleno began his career in Maryland government, working first for the Maryland General Assembly's Department of Fiscal Services, which provides staff support to Senators and Delegates. During this time, he was appointed Senior Analyst for the House Appropriations Committee. In 1995, he was hired by then-Montgomery County Executive Doug Duncan to work for Montgomery County's Office of Intergovernmental Relations. He served in that capacity until his election to the House of Delegates in 2002. He is considered an expert in the state budget process and serves on the Senate Budget and Taxation Committee.

== Elective office ==
In 2002, he won one of three seats representing Maryland's 18th district in the House of Delegates. He placed second, out of seven candidates, in the Democratic primary election in September 2002 and, along with his two fellow Democratic nominees, faced no Republican opponents in the general election.

In April 2006, incumbent district 18 senator Sharon Grosfeld announced that she would not be running for re-election. Madaleno decided to seek the Senate seat and quickly established himself as the leading candidate. Indeed, he attracted no primary opponents whatsoever and faced only nominal Republican opposition in November. His was the only open Senate seat in the whole of Maryland that did not see a primary contest. In the general election, he defeated his Republican opponent by more than three-to-one.

=== Legislative notes ===
In the Maryland Senate, Madaleno led efforts to advance legislation important to LGBT Marylanders. In 2009, he was the lead sponsor of the Religious Freedom and Civil Marriage Protection Act, which would have legalized same-sex marriage. Although that version of the bill was never voted on, Maryland legalized same-sex marriage three years later. Also in 2009, he successfully sponsored legislation with his colleague, Senator James N. Robey, to eliminate the inheritance tax paid by domestic partners on jointly owned primary residences. The legislation became law in July 2009. In 2014 he successfully sponsored a bill to make discrimination against transgender people illegal in housing, employment, and public accommodations. In 2018, he introduced legislation to protect young people from the dangers of conversion therapy.

In 2007, Madaleno sponsored legislation to increase the value of the Maryland Refundable Earned Income Tax Credit, an anti-poverty tool. During a special session later that year, the measure was incorporated into a larger tax bill and became law. In addition, he helped close a tax loophole that was costing Maryland roughly $10 million a year by passing legislation that stops a common business practice of artificially lowering taxable profits by paying rent, a deductible business expense, to shell companies controlled by the same parent company.

Madaleno co-sponsored the law requiring equal pay for equal work. In 2017, when federal funding for Planned Parenthood was under threat, he sponsored the law ensuring that funding for Planned Parenthood clinics in Maryland would continue. Madaleno co-sponsored a bill to allow counties to enact public financing for county elections. Madaleno co-sponsored a bill to increase the number of early-voting centers, and he fought attempts by Republicans to close early voting centers in populous areas of Montgomery County.

Madaleno has led efforts to improve public education and worked for equitable distribution of funding to public schools throughout Maryland. Madaleno authored the Hunger-Free Schools Act of 2017; as a result, qualified students across Maryland now receive free breakfast and lunch. Madaleno co-sponsored legislation expanding eligibility for tax credits for college savings and for those saddled with student loan debt, as well as a "tuition freeze" for Maryland college students from 2007 to 2010. The Washington Post credits Madaleno with helping to keep college affordable in Maryland.

Madaleno co-sponsored the law implementing the Affordable Care Act in Maryland; a 2017 law against price gouging by generic drug manufacturers; the Firearms Safety Act of 2013, which bans assault weapons and high-capacity magazines; a number of environmental regulations, including a ban on fracking; and legislation to improve public transit. In 2017, Madaleno worked with Maryland's congressional delegation to restore federal funding for programs that protect the Chesapeake Bay.

=== Candidacy for governor ===
In May 2017, Madaleno declared his candidacy to be Governor of Maryland. In February 2018, Madaleno announced that his running mate was business executive and former O'Malley appointee Luwanda Jenkins. Madaleno would have been the first Italian-American and the first openly gay governor of Maryland. Madaleno made history by publishing the first ever US political TV ad featuring a candidate kissing their same-sex spouse.

In the June 2018 primary, Madaleno finished in fifth place for the Democratic nomination, which was won by Ben Jealous.

=== Montgomery County government ===
In November 2018, it was announced that Madaleno would be nominated to serve as budget director for Montgomery County Executive Marc Elrich.

== Awards and honors ==
- 2007, 2008, and 2009: Certificate of Appreciation, Maryland Municipal League
- 2009: Legislative Award, The Arc of Maryland
- 2014: Consumer Hero, Maryland Consumer Rights Coalition
- 2016: MLK Courageous Leadership Award, Maryland Citizens' Health Initiative

== Personal ==
Madaleno was the first person to be elected to the General Assembly as an openly gay candidate. He is also the first openly gay Maryland state senator. Along with Delegates Maggie McIntosh, Anne Kaiser, Heather Mizeur, Peter Murphy, Mary Washington, Bonnie Cullison, Luke Clippinger and Meagan Simonaire he formed part of the nine-strong gay grouping in the Maryland General Assembly. His election campaigns have won the support of the Gay & Lesbian Victory Fund.

Madaleno is a member of Cedar Lane Unitarian Universalist Church, where he has chaired the Social Justice Council and taught Sunday School.

He and his husband, Mark, have two children. They are Kensington homeowners.

== See also ==
- 2018 Maryland gubernatorial election
