= Ana Sol Gutierrez =

American politician (born 1942)

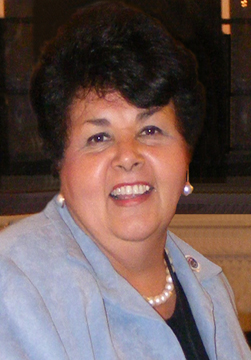

Member of the Maryland House of Delegates from the 18th district
- In office January 8, 2003 – January 9, 2019
- Succeeded by: Emily Shetty
- Constituency: District 18, Montgomery County

Personal details
- Born: January 11, 1942 (age 84) Santa Ana, El Salvador
- Party: Democratic
- Children: 3 sons
- Education: Pennsylvania State University; American University
- Occupation: Public servant, Politician

Ana Sol Gutierrez (born January 11, 1942) is a Democratic politician from the U.S. state of Maryland who was the first Latina to ever be elected to the Maryland General Assembly. She served four terms in the Maryland House of Delegates, representing Montgomery County in Maryland's 18th district. Gutierrez sat on the Appropriations Committee and was chair of the Delinquency Prevention and Diversion Services Task Force beginning in 2006. In 2003, Gutierrez was the first Latina elected to state office.

In 2016, Gutierrez ran unsuccessfully for the Democratic nomination in Maryland's 8th Congressional District, ultimately being defeated by Jamie Raskin.

== Background ==
Gutierrez was born in Santa Ana, El Salvador and came to the United States with her family in 1947. She attended Bethesda-Chevy Chase High School where she graduated in 1960, before moving on to Pennsylvania State University, garnering a B.S. in chemistry in 1964. Furthermore, she earned an M.S. in technology of management, scientific & technical information systems from American University, and did her postgraduate studies in applied engineering at George Washington University. From 1975 to 1981, Gutierrez taught computer science courses in Venezuela, Bolivia, and Peru before returning with her family to Maryland. Gutierrez has served in all three levels of government. As a deputy administrator in the Transportation Department during the Clinton Administration, on the Montgomery County School Board, and as a Delegate for the 18th District. She was the first Latina to represent Montgomery County in the General Assembly, as well as the first Salvadoran-American to be elected to public office in the United States.

=== Notable positions held ===
- Member, Board of Education, Montgomery County, 1990–98 (president, 1995–96; vice-president, 1994–95).
- Member, Governor's Commission on Hispanic Affairs, 1989–91, 1992–94.
- Deputy Administrator, Research and Special Programs Administration, U.S. Department of Transportation, 1994–96.
- Member, Task Force to Study Driver Licensing Documentation, 2003–04.

== Drivers' licenses for undocumented immigrants ==
Ana Sol Gutierrez is strongly allied with CASA of Maryland in support of a system whereby the default Maryland Driving Permit will not conform to the standards mandated by the Real ID Act, and may be issued to undocumented immigrants. She favors the issuance of a special ID which will conform to federal standards which would allow the bearer to enter federal buildings, board planes, and engage in other transactions which require identity cards conforming to the standards set out in the Real ID Act of 2005. She opposes a two-tier licensing system which would issue driving permits to undocumented immigrants, but which would not conform to the Real ID standards which would be the default for Maryland driving permits issued to qualified Marylanders, because "[i]n this climate, that's a scarlet letter". Governor Martin O'Malley later directed the Maryland Motor Vehicle Administration to phase in compliance to the Real ID standards by 2010.
