= Maryland Legislative District 18 =

American legislative district

Maryland's legislative district 18
- Represents part of Montgomery County
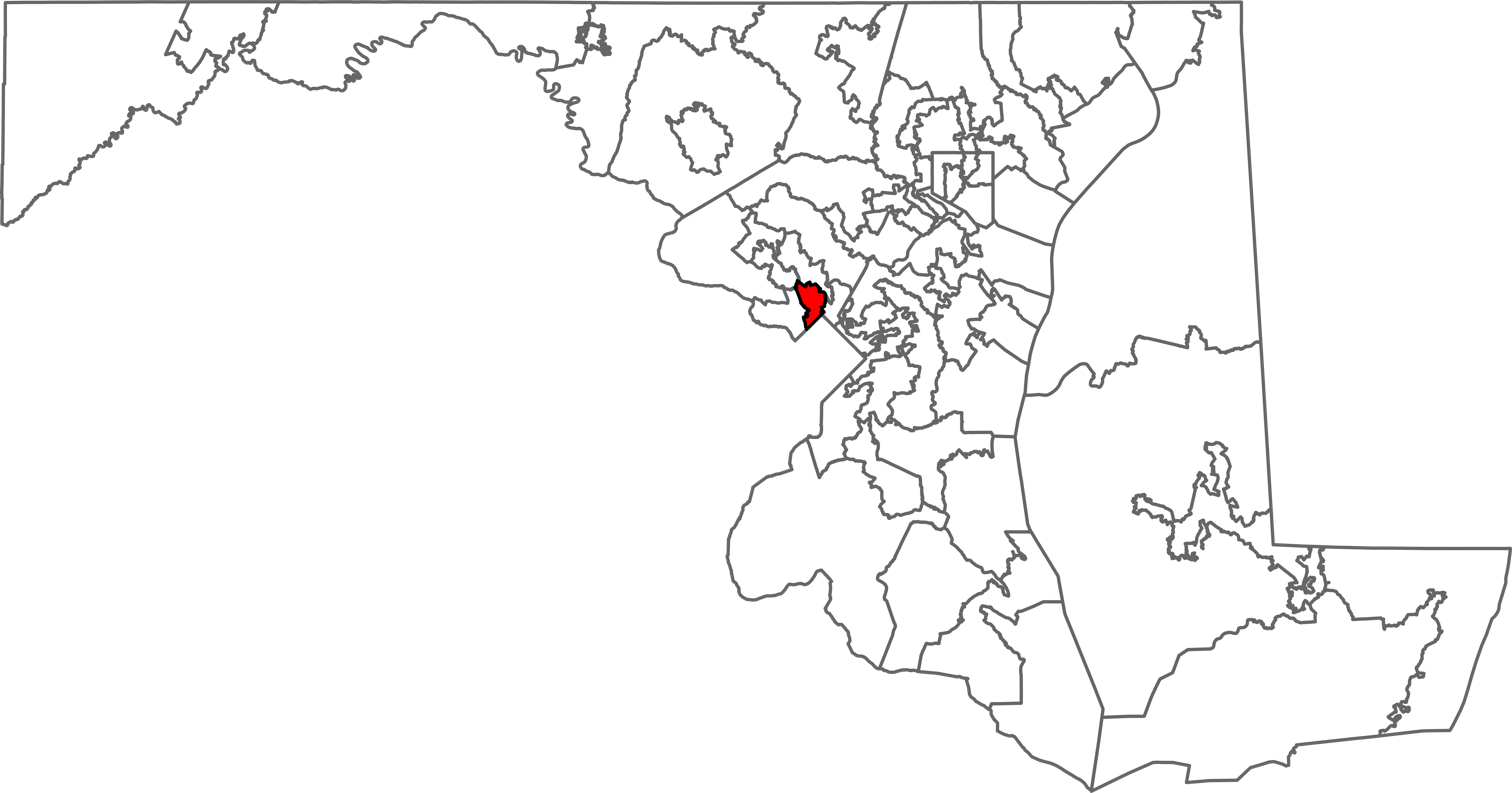
- Senator: Jeff Waldstreicher (D)
- Delegate(s): Aaron Kaufman (D); Emily K. Shetty (D); Jared Solomon (D)
- Registration: 66.2% Democratic; 12.7% Republican; 19.8% unaffiliated
- Demographics: 46.2% White; 14.2% Black/African American; 0.9% Native American; 10.2% Asian; 0.0% Hawaiian/Pacific Islander; 15.8% Other race; 12.6% Two or more races; 27.6% Hispanic
- Population (2020): 127,728
- Voting-age population: 97,948
- Registered voters: 78,600

Maryland Legislative District 18 is one of 47 Senate legislative districts and one of 71 House legislative districts in the state for the Maryland General Assembly. It covers part of Montgomery County. The district is represented by three delegates in the Maryland House of Delegates.

== Demographic characteristics ==
As of the 2020 United States census, the district had a population of 127,728, of whom 97,948 (76.7%) were of voting age. The racial makeup of the district was 59,044 (46.2%) White, 18,074 (14.2%) African American, 1,136 (0.9%) Native American, 13,012 (10.2%) Asian, 34 (0.0%) Pacific Islander, 20,240 (15.8%) from some other race, and 16,118 (12.6%) from two or more races. Hispanic or Latino of any race were 35,290 (27.6%) of the population.

The district had 78,600 registered voters as of October 17, 2020, of whom 15,551 (19.8%) were registered as unaffiliated, 9,981 (12.7%) were registered as Republicans, 52,019 (66.2%) were registered as Democrats, and 630 (0.8%) were registered to other parties.

== Political representation ==
The district is represented for the 2023–2027 legislative term in the State Senate by Jeff Waldstreicher (D) and in the House of Delegates by Aaron Kaufman (D), Emily K. Shetty (D) and Jared Solomon (D).

== Election history ==
Years	Senator	Party	Electoral history
January 8, 1975 – January 9, 1991	Margaret Schweinhaut	Democratic	Redistricted from District 3-B and re-elected in 1974. Re-elected in 1978. Re-elected in 1982. Re-elected in 1986. Lost renomination.
January 9, 1991 – January 11, 1995	Patricia R. Sher	Democratic	Elected in 1990. Lost renomination.
January 11, 1995 – January 3, 2003	Chris Van Hollen	Democratic	Elected in 1994. Re-elected in 1998. Retired to run for Congress.
January 8, 2003 – January 10, 2007	Sharon M. Grosfeld	Democratic	Elected in 2002. Retired.
January 10, 2007 – January 9, 2019	Richard Madaleno	Democratic	Elected in 2006. Re-elected in 2010. Re-elected in 2014. Retired to run for governor.
January 9, 2019 – present	Jeff Waldstreicher	Democratic	Elected in 2018. Re-elected in 2022. Re-elected in 2026.
