= RespectAbility =

U.S. disability rights organization

RespectAbility is an American nonpartisan nonprofit organization for individuals with disabilities established to alter societies views and advance opportunities for people with disabilities. It was founded in 2013 by Jennifer Laszlo Mizrahi, Donn Weinberg (from The Harry and Jeanette Weinberg Foundation) and Shelly Cohen. Its current President and CEO is Ariel Simms, and its chairperson is Ollie Cantos.

It changed its name in 2024 to Disability Belongs to better reflect that it is about people with disabilities.

== Education and employment for persons with disabilities ==
RespectAbility is working to expand education and employment opportunities for people with disabilities. RespectAbility has worked with governors across the country to help advance and realign state programs to help people with disabilities obtain competitive, integrated employment opportunities. RespectAbility has provided testimony on disability employment in all 50 states and at the federal level.

== Disabled persons in media and movies ==
RespectAbility is working to change the narrative in Hollywood to ensure accurate and positive media portrayals of people with disabilities. RespectAbility is working with several partners within the entertainment industry on the full inclusion of people with disabilities, both in front and behind the camera. A toolkit entitled " The Hollywood Disability Inclusion Toolkit" was developed to help the media industry incorporate people with disabilities into their programs and shows. Reality-TV pioneer Jonathan Murray is on the board of directors and says that Americans with disabilities are the third largest market behind Baby Boomers and the mature market and represent a market segment of $1 billion, so it makes sense to incorporate them into the business.

Born This Way, which won an Emmy for best Outstanding Unstructured Reality Program in 2017, stars seven diverse young adults with Down syndrome as they deal with issues around employment, independent living, education and romance. The show was created by former RespectAbility board member Jonathan Murray. It was launched at an event on Capitol Hill hosted by RespectAbility along with Congressman Brad Sherman and Congresswoman Cathy McMorris Rodgers. Murray was recognized for this and other inclusion work by Variety.

And other shows such as The Good Doctor, Speechless, Pablo have also been successful.

== Grants ==
A number of foundations have funded programs to help RespectAbility achieve its goals of breaking down barriers.

In addition to the MacArthur Foundation, the Conrad N. Hilton Foundation provided a $1 million grant in 2021. The Milbank Foundation donated $100,000.

The Pop Culture Collaborative has provided a grant to improve hiring practices behind the camera, specifically to increase staff for their story-consultants and disabled experts working in writers rooms and with studio and network executives.

New speakers who are joining through the Jewish Disability Speakers Bureau will be able to receive training through funding provided by several foundations, including the Charles and Lynn Schusterman Family Foundation, the David Berg Foundation, Jewish Community Foundation of Los Angeles, The Diane P. & Guilford Glazer Fund and others.

== National Leadership Program ==
The National Leadership Program is an Apprenticeship program which enables individuals with and without disabilities to gain experience in policy, development, fundraising, publicity and general political discourse surrounding individuals with disabilities and their integration into the community. The MacArthur Foundation provided $75,000 funding for this in 2021.

== Jewish Disability Speakers Bureau ==
At the end of 2020 RespectAbility launched a Jewish Disability Speakers Bureau to include a wide range of allow people with disabilities to speak virtually at conferences, synagogues, and other events. These include Jewish lawyers, entrepreneurs, teachers, rabbis, filmmakers and comedians. The program is beginning with 24 speakers, but will grow and provide training to others as they join.

== Political outreach and advocacy ==
RespectAbility is the parent organization for www.TheRespectAbilityReport.org, which covers the intersection of politics and public policy. It covered all the presidential candidates in the 2016 and 2020 presidential campaigns. Their political advocacy was featured in a segment on the PBS NewsHour, The Diane Rehm Show, page 1 of The New York Times, and page 1 of The Washington Post and NPR, HME News, The Atlantic and other publications.
