= Jane Lawton =

American politician

Jane E Lawton
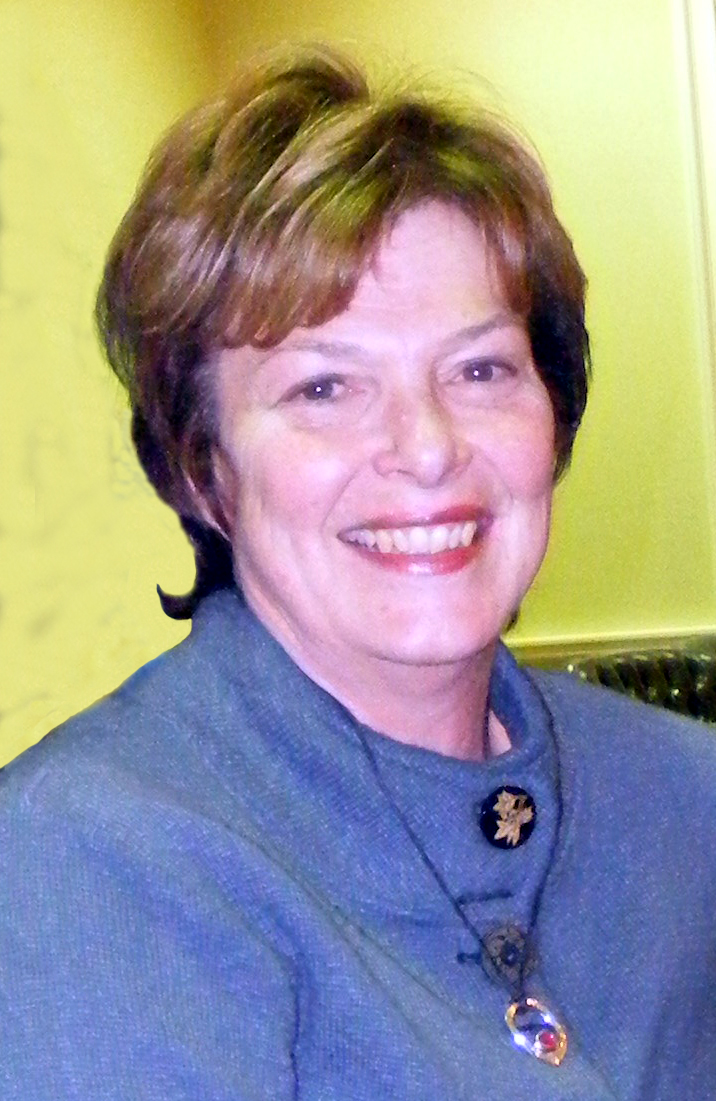
- Lawton in 2007

Maryland House of Delegates
- In office 2005–2007
- Preceded by: John Hurson
- Succeeded by: Alfred C. Carr, Jr.
- Constituency: District 18, Montgomery County

Mayor of Chevy Chase, Maryland
- In office 1988–1991

Personal details
- Born: May 24, 1944 Muskogee, Oklahoma, U.S.
- Died: November 29, 2007 (aged 63) Ronald Reagan Building, Washington, D.C.
- Party: Democratic
- Spouse: Stephan E. Lawton
- Children: 2

Jane Lawton (May 24, 1944 – November 29, 2007) was an American politician from Maryland and a member of the Democratic Party. The Jane E. Lawton community center, located in Leland Park in Chevy Chase, Maryland, was renamed in her memory on June 14, 2009.

== Early life and education ==
Lawton was born in Muskogee, Oklahoma, on May 24, 1944, to Clarence and Ruth Alice England. Lawton attended the University of Oklahoma where she graduated Phi Beta Kappa.

== Career ==
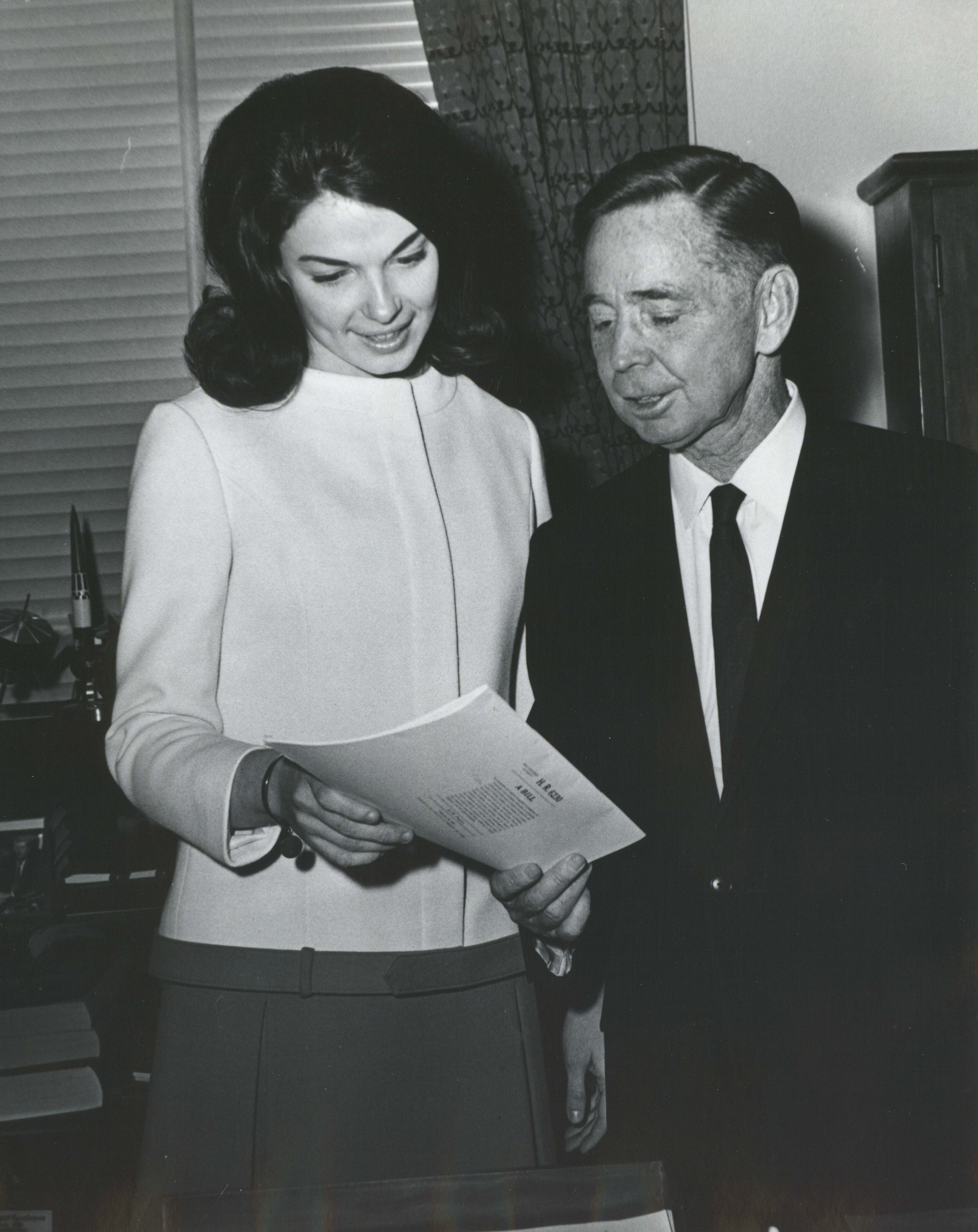
Lawton with Speaker of the House Carl Albert while working as his special assistant

After college Lawton worked briefly for IBM. She also worked as Special Assistant to the Speaker of the United States House of Representatives, Carl Albert, until the birth of her first child in 1974. She became a member of the Town of Chevy Chase Town Council in 1981, later becoming treasurer, then chairperson (this position is now mayor). Later, she was Special Assistant to Neil Potter when he was County Executive of Montgomery County. After Doug Duncan succeeded Potter, she became the County Cable Administrator. In the state legislature, she was originally appointed to fill the seat of former delegate John Hurson, but was elected in her own right in the fall of 2006. She passed two bills during her brief time in office. The following session, two more bills were passed in her name, one of which was a Farms-to-Schools program she had been working on the previous session and planned to introduce during the 2008 legislative session. She also served on the Environmental Matters Committee while in the House.

== Legislative notes ==
- voted for the Healthy Air Act in 2006 (SB154)
- voted in favor of increasing the sales tax by one percentage point to 6% - Tax Reform Act of 2007(HB2)

== Death ==
Lawton died of unknown causes on the morning of November 29, 2007, after giving a speech in downtown Washington. She was declared dead at George Washington Hospital Center. Her death appeared to be caused by a heart attack.

Lawton was a long standing member and past-president of the National Association of Telecommunications Officers and Advisors (NATOA). In 2008, NATOA created and awarded the first Jane E. Lawton Commemorative Award, presented yearly to an elected official who exemplifies what it means to promote community interests in communications.

The Jane Lawton internship was created to honor her memory through the President's Leadership Class.
