= Alfred C. Carr Jr. =

American politician (born 1965)

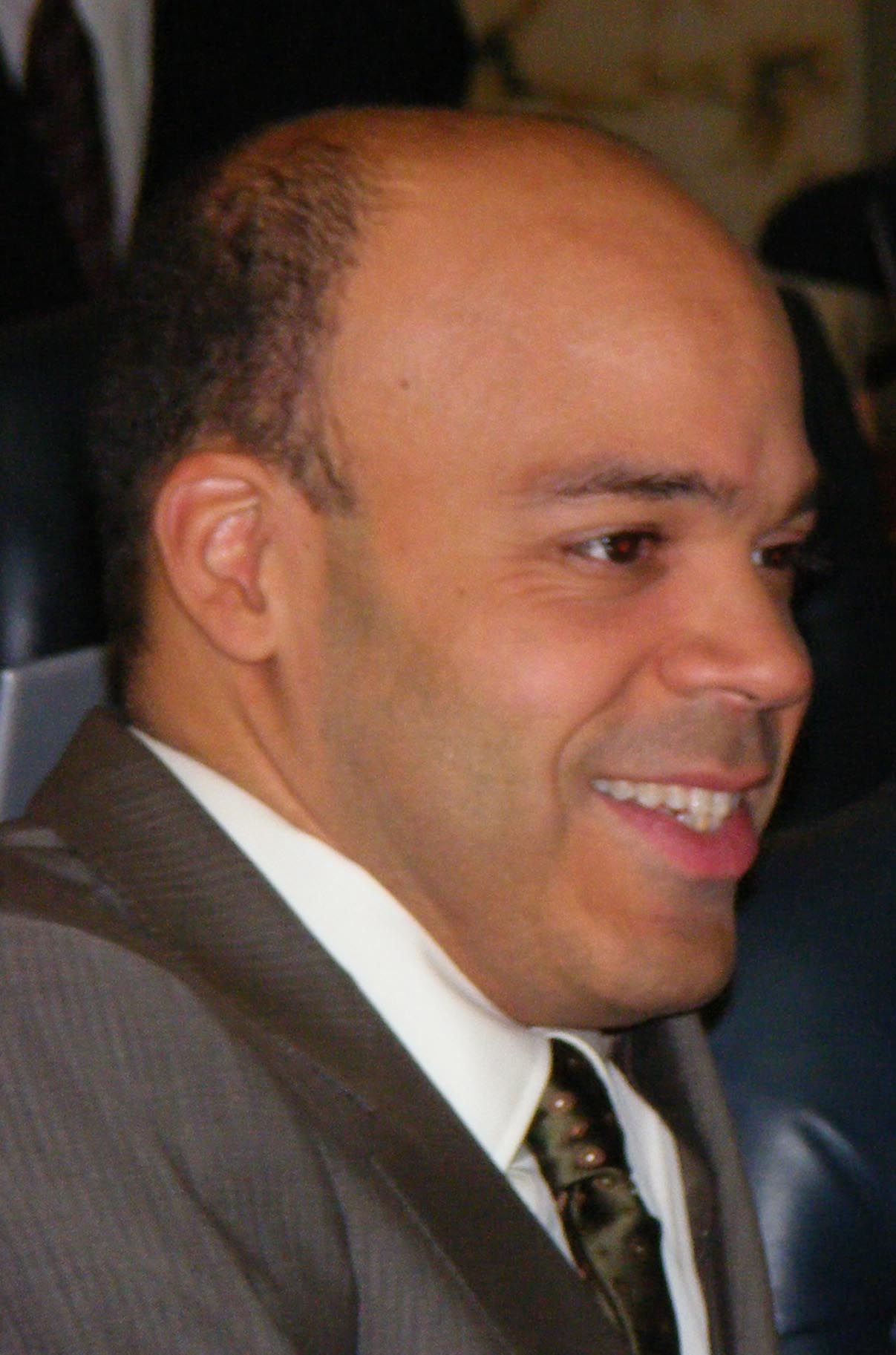

Member of the Maryland House of Delegates from the 18th district
- In office December 20, 2007 – January 11, 2023 Serving with Emily Shetty and Jared Solomon
- Preceded by: Jane Lawton
- Succeeded by: Aaron Kaufman
- Constituency: Montgomery County

Member of the Kensington Town Council
- In office 2002–2007

Personal details
- Born: November 2, 1965 (age 60) Cleveland, Ohio, U.S.
- Party: Democratic
- Spouse: Barrie L. Carr
- Children: Miles, Toby and Oliver
- Occupation: telecommunications businessman

Alfred Clinton Carr Jr. (born November 2, 1965) is an American politician and public servant from Maryland. Carr is a member of the Democratic Party. He was a member of the Maryland House of Delegates, representing Maryland's District 18 in Montgomery County.

== Background ==
Carr was born in Cleveland, Ohio, on November 2, 1965. Carr’s 5th great grandmother was Martha Jefferson Carr, sister of Thomas Jefferson. He is a descendent of Judath Barnett, a free woman of color, and Jefferson's nephew, Samuel Carr.

Carr earned a Bachelor of Science from the University of Rochester in electrical engineering with honors in 1988. He also holds a Certificate in Local Government Studies from the University of Maryland.

== In the legislature ==
Carr was a member of House of Delegates from December 20, 2007, to January 11, 2023. He served on the House Environment and Transportation Committee and its subcommittees on Real Property, Local Government, and Land Use & Ethics. He was House Chair of the Joint Committee on Federal Relations, which guides the relationship between State and Federal governments. He was a member of the Montgomery County Delegation and chair of its Metropolitan Washington Committee, which vets legislation related to local utilities. Carr is also a member of the Legislative Black Caucus of Maryland.

In his first year in the legislature, two of the bills he sponsored, House Bills 742 and 1604, were passed and signed into law by the governor. Focusing on sustainable solutions, he has secured passage of legislation on education, environmental protection, clean energy, economic development, consumer protection, transportation, open government, public safety, affordable housing, and historic preservation.

Carr has consistently received endorsements and high ratings from environmental advocacy groups, consumer protection organizations, and the Montgomery County teachers, police and fire fighters.

On April 15, 2022, Carr withdrew his re-election bid to the Maryland House of Delegates, instead seeking to run for the 4th District of the Montgomery County Council. He was defeated by Takoma Park mayor Kate Stewart in the Democratic primary.
