= Maryland Legislative District 27 =

American legislative district

Maryland's legislative district 27
- Represents parts of Calvert County, Charles County and Prince George's County
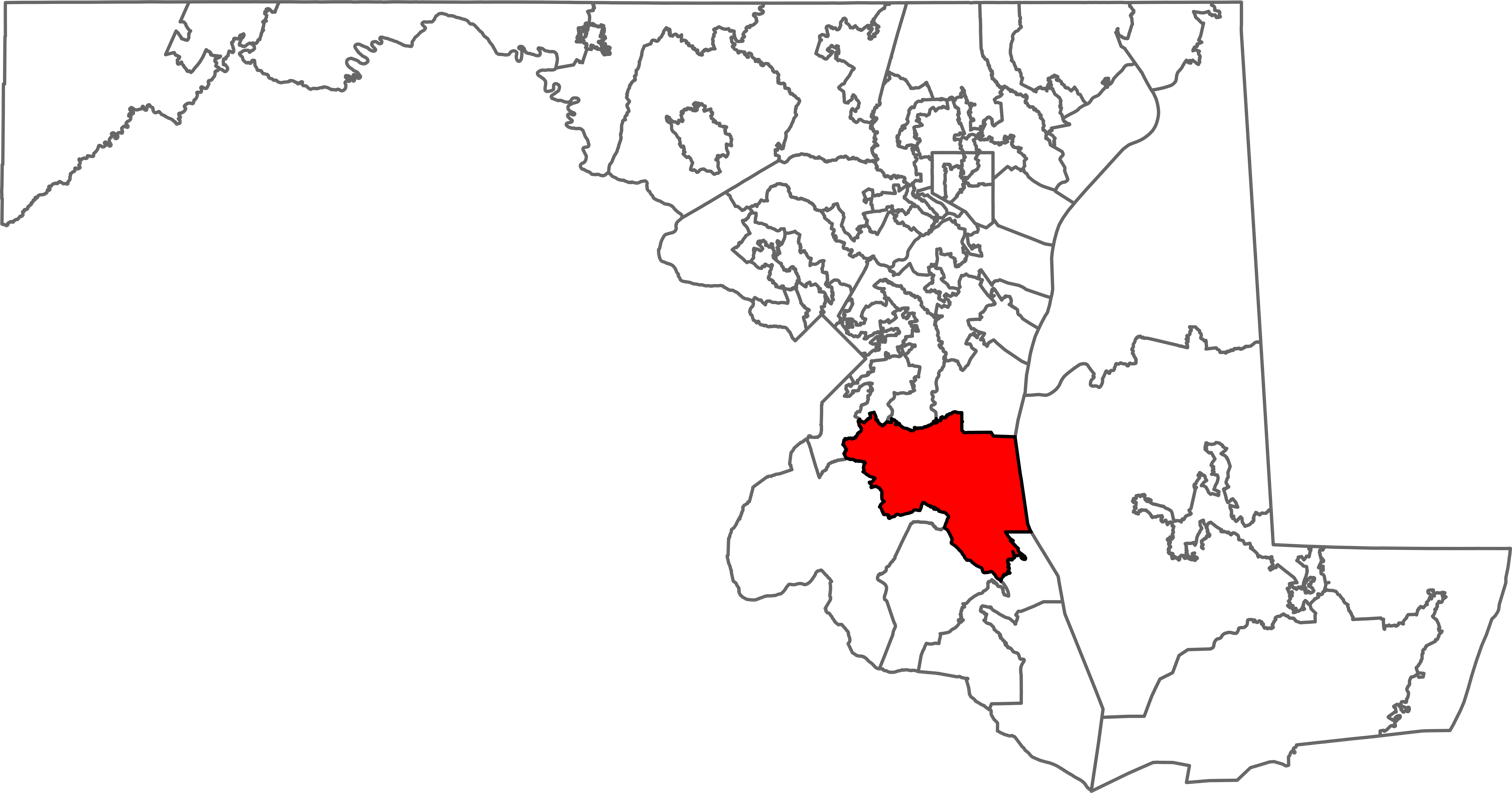
- Senator: Kevin Harris (D)
- Delegate(s): Darrell Odom (D) (District 27A); Jeffrie Long Jr. (D) (District 27B); Mark N. Fisher (R) (District 27C)
- Registration: 55.0% Democratic; 26.8% Republican; 16.6% unaffiliated
- Demographics: 48.0% White; 38.7% Black/African American; 0.5% Native American; 2.1% Asian; 0.1% Hawaiian/Pacific Islander; 3.1% Other race; 7.6% Two or more races; 6.4% Hispanic
- Population (2020): 141,454
- Voting-age population: 109,493
- Registered voters: 106,667

Maryland Legislative District 27 is one of 47 districts in the state for the Maryland General Assembly. It covers parts of Calvert County, Charles County and Prince George's County. The district is divided into three sub-districts for the Maryland House of Delegates: District 27A, District 27B and District 27C.

== Demographic characteristics ==
As of the 2020 United States census, the district had a population of 141,454, of whom 109,493 (77.4%) were of voting age. The racial makeup of the district was 67,891 (48.0%) White, 54,779 (38.7%) African American, 684 (0.5%) Native American, 2,935 (2.1%) Asian, 92 (0.1%) Pacific Islander, 4,325 (3.1%) from some other race, and 10,721 (7.6%) from two or more races. Hispanic or Latino of any race were 9,026 (6.4%) of the population.

The district had 106,667 registered voters as of October 17, 2020, of whom 17,732 (16.6%) were registered as unaffiliated, 28,581 (26.8%) were registered as Republicans, 58,641 (55.0%) were registered as Democrats, and 1,196 (1.1%) were registered to other parties.

== Political representation ==
The district is represented for the 2023–2027 legislative term in the State Senate by Kevin Harris (D) and in the House of Delegates by Darrell Odom (D, District 27A), Jeffrie Long Jr. (D, District 27B) and Mark N. Fisher (R, District 27C).

== Election history ==
Years	Senator	Party	Electoral history
January 8, 1975 – January 12, 1983	Peter A. Bozick	Democratic	Redistricted from District 4-C and re-elected in 1974. Re-elected in 1978. Retired.
January 12, 1983 – December 23, 2020	Thomas V. Miller Jr.	Democratic	Redistricted from the 28th district and re-elected in 1982. Re-elected in 1986. Re-elected in 1990. Re-elected in 1994. Re-elected in 1998. Re-elected in 2002. Re-elected in 2006. Re-elected in 2010. Re-elected in 2014. Re-elected in 2018. Resigned.
January 13, 2021 – November 1, 2025	Michael A. Jackson	Democratic	Appointed to serve the remainder of Miller's term. Elected in 2022. Resigned.
December 9, 2025 – present	Kevin Harris	Democratic	Appointed to serve the remainder of Jackson's term. Elected in 2026.
