= Maryland House of Delegates District 27A =

American legislative district

Maryland's legislative district 27A
- Represents parts of Charles County and Prince George's County
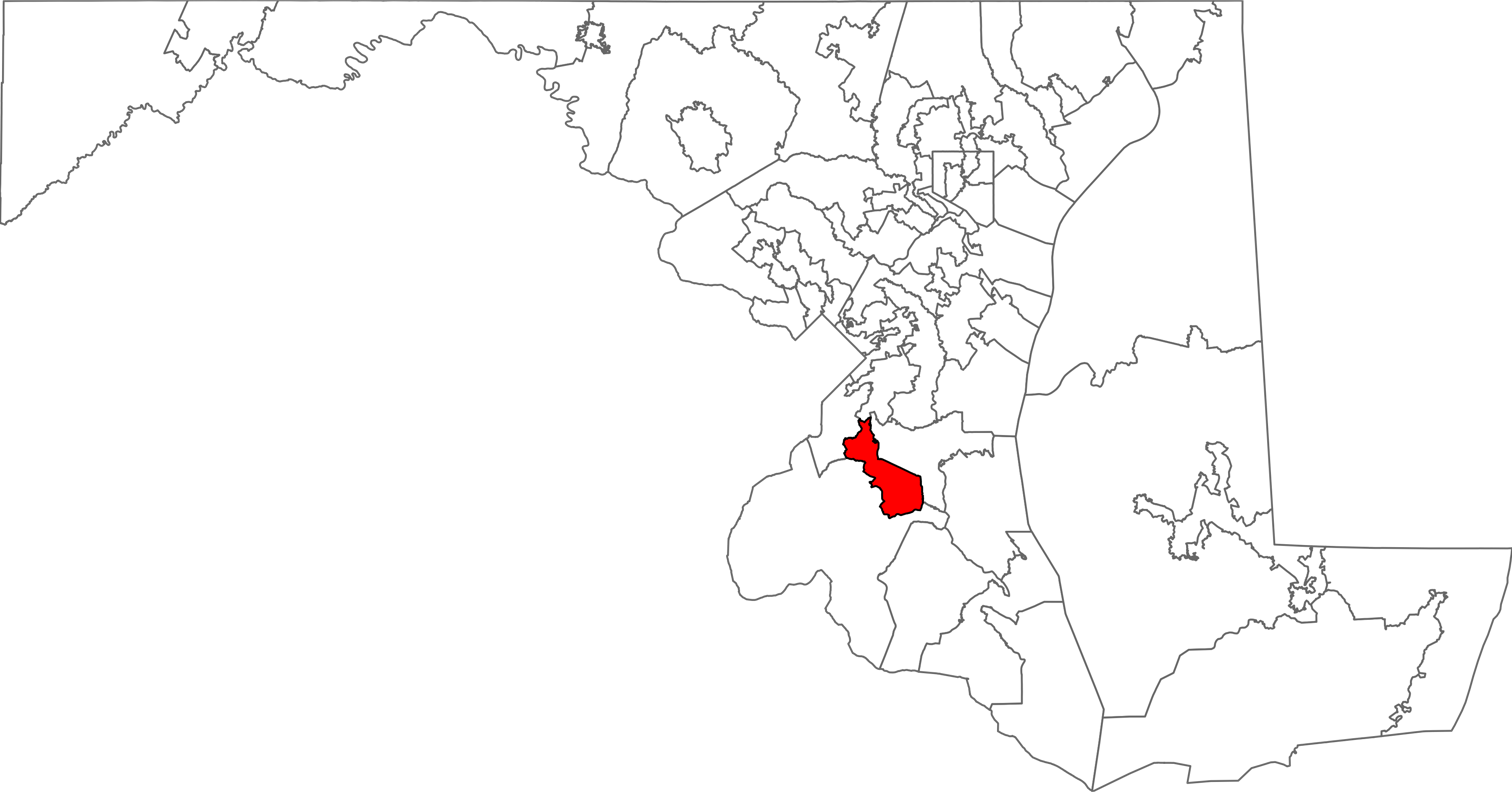
- Delegate(s): Darrell Odom (D)
- Registration: 72.1% Democratic; 13.0% Republican; 13.2% unaffiliated
- Demographics: 21.8% White; 63.0% Black/African American; 0.7% Native American; 2.7% Asian; 0.0% Hawaiian/Pacific Islander; 4.7% Other race; 7.0% Two or more races; 8.1% Hispanic
- Population (2020): 50,488
- Voting-age population: 39,504
- Registered voters: 37,984

Maryland House of Delegates District 27A is one of the 71 districts that compose the Maryland House of Delegates. Along with subdistricts 27B and 27C, it makes up the 27th district of the Maryland Senate. District 27A includes parts of Charles County and Prince George's County, and is represented by one delegate.

== Demographic characteristics ==
As of the 2020 United States census, the district had a population of 50,488, of whom 39,504 (78.2%) were of voting age. The racial makeup of the district was 11,002 (21.8%) White, 31,811 (63.0%) African American, 359 (0.7%) Native American, 1,346 (2.7%) Asian, 18 (0.0%) Pacific Islander, 2,390 (4.7%) from some other race, and 3,545 (7.0%) from two or more races. Hispanic or Latino of any race were 4,077 (8.1%) of the population.

The district had 37,984 registered voters as of October 17, 2020, of whom 5,029 (13.2%) were registered as unaffiliated, 4,956 (13.0%) were registered as Republicans, 27,384 (72.1%) were registered as Democrats, and 474 (1.2%) were registered to other parties.

== Past Election Results ==
=== 1998 ===
Name	Party	Votes	Percent	Outcome
James E. Proctor Jr.	Democratic	20,572	50.0%	Won
Joseph F. Vallario Jr.	Democratic	20,492	50.0%	Won

=== 2002 ===
Name	Party	Votes	Percent	Outcome
James E. Proctor Jr.	Democratic	16,956	37.8%	Won
Joseph F. Vallario Jr.	Democratic	16,196	36.2%	Won
Kenneth S. Brown	Republican	5,815	13.0%	Lost
Albert D. Larsen	Republican	5,802	13.0%	Lost
Other Write-Ins		36	0.1%	

=== 2006 ===
Name	Party	Votes	Percent	Outcome
James E. Proctor Jr.	Democratic	19,829	40.3%	Won
Joseph F. Vallario Jr.	Democratic	18,677	38.0%	Won
Kenneth S. Brown	Republican	5,687	11.6%	Lost
Antoinette Jarboe-Duley	Republican	4,948	10.1%	Lost
Other Write-Ins		48	0.1%	

=== 2010 ===
Name	Party	Votes	Percent	Outcome
James E. Proctor Jr.	Democratic	25,487	43.4%	Won
Joseph F. Vallario Jr.	Democratic	22,627	38.5%	Won
Mike Hethmon	Republican	5,442	9.3%	Lost
Antoinette Jarboe-Duley	Republican	5,123	8.7%	Lost
Other Write-Ins		53	0.1%	

=== 2014 ===
Name	Party	Votes	Percent	Outcome
James E. Proctor Jr.	Democratic	10,374	73.7%	Won
Joe Crawford	Republican	3,685	26.2%	Lost
Other Write-Ins		21	0.1%	

=== 2018 ===
Name	Party	Votes	Percent	Outcome
Susie Proctor	Democratic	17,534	98.2%	Won
Other Write-Ins		322	1.8%	
