= Kevin Harris (politician) =

American politician (born 1981)

Kevin M. Harris
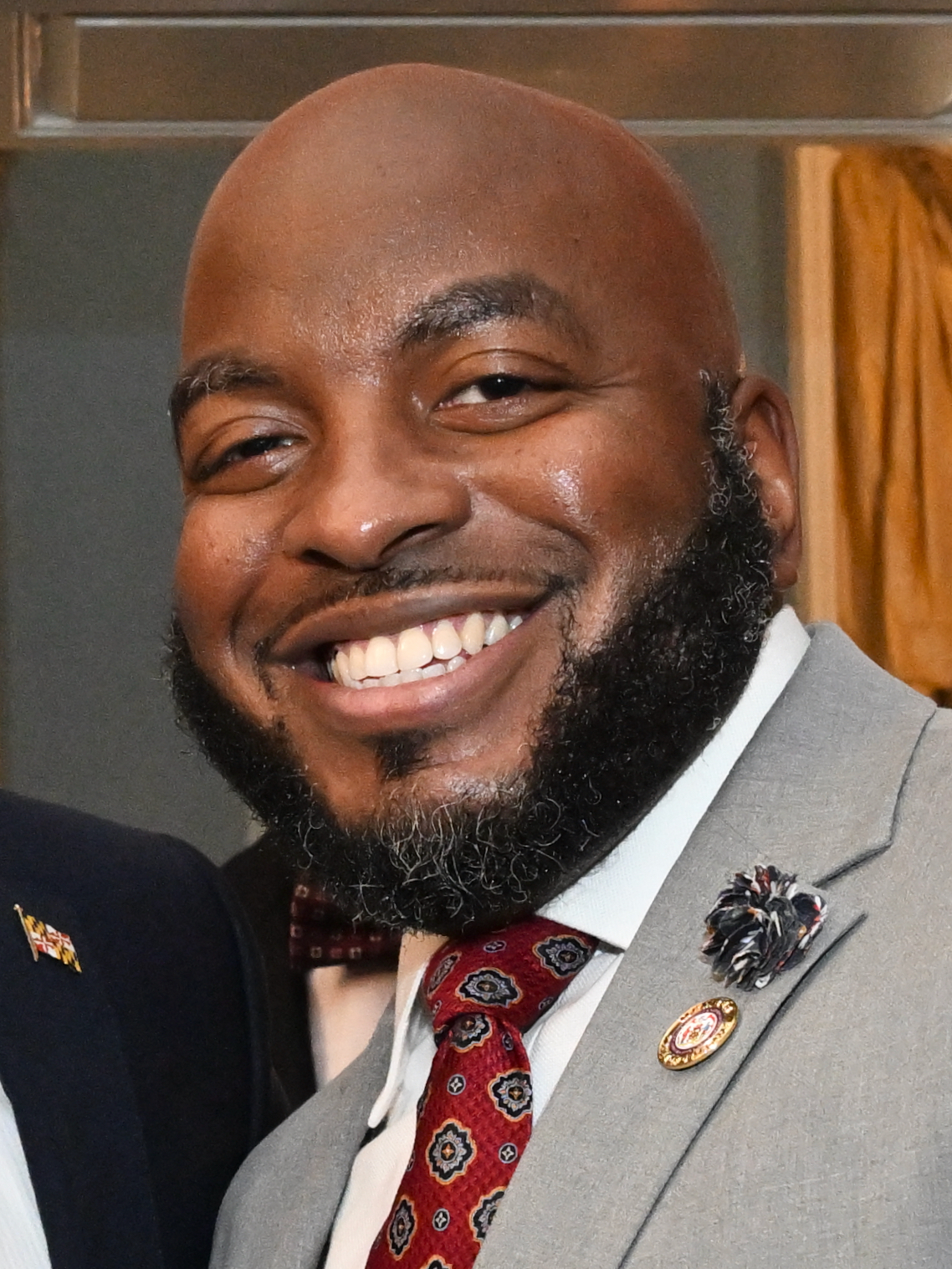
- Harris in 2023

Member of the Maryland Senate from the 27th district
- Incumbent
- Assumed office December 9, 2025
- Appointed by: Wes Moore
- Preceded by: Michael Jackson

Member of the Maryland House of Delegates from the 27A district
- In office January 11, 2023 – December 8, 2025
- Preceded by: Susie Proctor
- Succeeded by: Darrell Odom

Personal details
- Born: October 24, 1981 (age 44) Newark, New Jersey, U.S.
- Party: Democratic
- Education: Washington Bible College (BA); Walden University (MS)
- Website: Campaign website

Military service
- Branch/service: United States Navy
- Years of service: 1999–2009
- Awards: Joint Service Commendation Medal; Navy and Marine Corps Achievement Medal; Humanitarian Service Medal; Global War on Terrorism Service Medal; National Defense Service Medal

Kevin M. Harris (born October 24, 1981) is an American politician who is a member of the Maryland Senate representing the 27th district since 2025. A member of the Democratic Party, he previously served as a member of the Maryland House of Delegates from District 27A from 2023 to 2025.

== Background ==
Harris graduated from St. Benedict's Preparatory School in 1999, and served in the United States Navy until 2009. He later graduated from Washington Bible College with a Bachelor of Arts degree in general studies in 2011, and Walden University with a Master of Science degree in leadership development in 2014. Since 2011, he has worked at Fort Meade.

In 2018, Harris ran for the Prince George's County Council in District 9, seeking to succeed councilmember Mel Franklin, who was running for the at-large seat on the council. He came in third-to-last-place in the Democratic primary, receiving only 4.8 percent of the vote.

In 2022, Harris ran for the Maryland House of Delegates in District 27A, challenging incumbent Susie Proctor. Harris defeated Proctor in the Democratic primary with 55.9 percent of the vote. He was unopposed in the general election.

== In the legislature ==
Harris was sworn into the Maryland House of Delegates on January 11, 2023. He was a member of the House Appropriations Committee.

In October 2025, after Governor Wes Moore named state senator Michael Jackson as the secretary of Maryland State Police, Harris announced that he would seek appointment to the Maryland Senate to fill the remainder of Jackson's term. His candidacy was supported by Jackson and Prince George's County Executive Aisha Braveboy. The Charles County Democratic Central Committee, Calvert County Democratic Central Committee, and Prince George's County Democratic Central Committee voted to nominate Harris to the seat in November 2025. Governor Wes Moore appointed Harris to the seat on December 5, 2025, and sworn in on December 9. He is a member of the Senate Education, Energy, and Environment Committee.

== Political positions ==
=== Education ===
During the 2026 legislative session, Harris introduced the Maryland Phone-Free Schools Act, which would restrict students' use of personal electronic devices and ban social media use during school hours.

=== Energy ===
During the 2026 legislative session, Harris introduced a bill that would allow utilities to build and operate their own power stations, which would be paid for through ratepayer funds.

== Personal life ==
Harris is a regional protocol director for the Full Gospel Baptist Church Fellowship.

=== Decorations and badges ===
Harris' decorations and medals include:

Joint Service Commendation Medal
Navy and Marine Corps Achievement Medal
Humanitarian Service Medal
Global War on Terrorism Service Medal
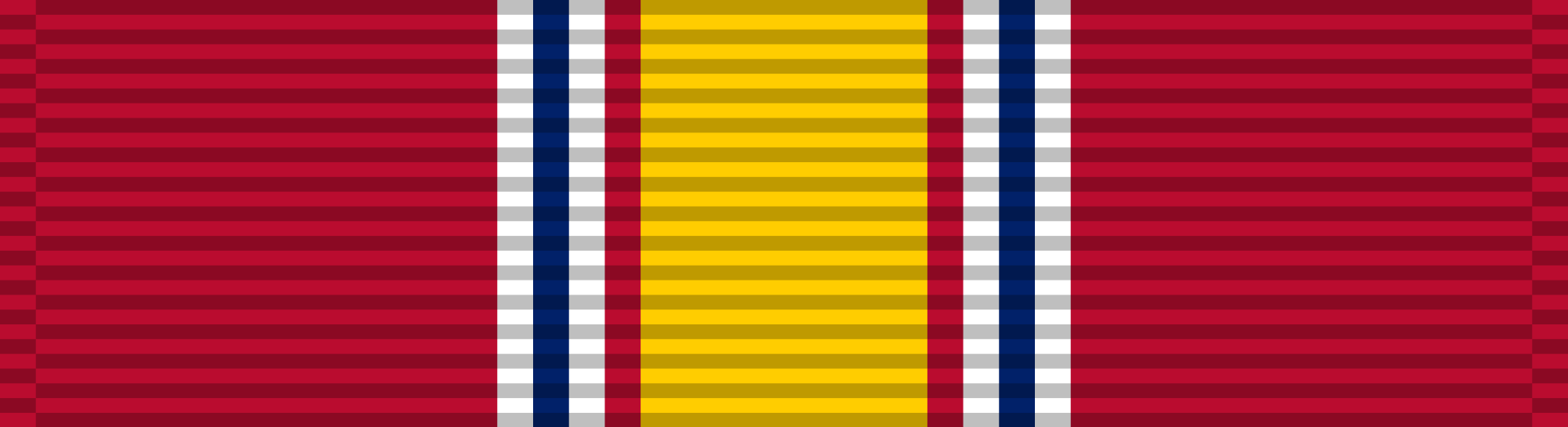
National Defense Service Medal

== Electoral history ==
Prince George's County Council District 9 Democratic primary election, 2018
Party	Candidate	Votes	%
Democratic	Sydney Harrison	7,125	34.5
Democratic	Tamara Davis Brown	7,070	34.2
Democratic	Rodney C. Taylor	1,876	9.1
Democratic	Tanya J. Brooks	1,864	9.0
Democratic	Orlando D. Barnes	1,152	5.6
Democratic	Kevin M. Harris	984	4.8
Democratic	Daren L. Hester	377	1.8
Democratic	Jeffrey JRaz Rascoe	196	0.9

Maryland House of Delegates District 27A Democratic primary election, 2022
Party	Candidate	Votes	%
Democratic	Kevin M. Harris	3,292	55.9
Democratic	Susie Proctor (incumbent)	2,594	44.1

Maryland House of Delegates District 27A election, 2022
Party	Candidate	Votes	%
Democratic	Kevin M. Harris	11,783	97.99
Write-in		242	2.01
