= Maryland House of Delegates District 27C =

American legislative district

Maryland's legislative district 27C
- Represents part of Calvert County
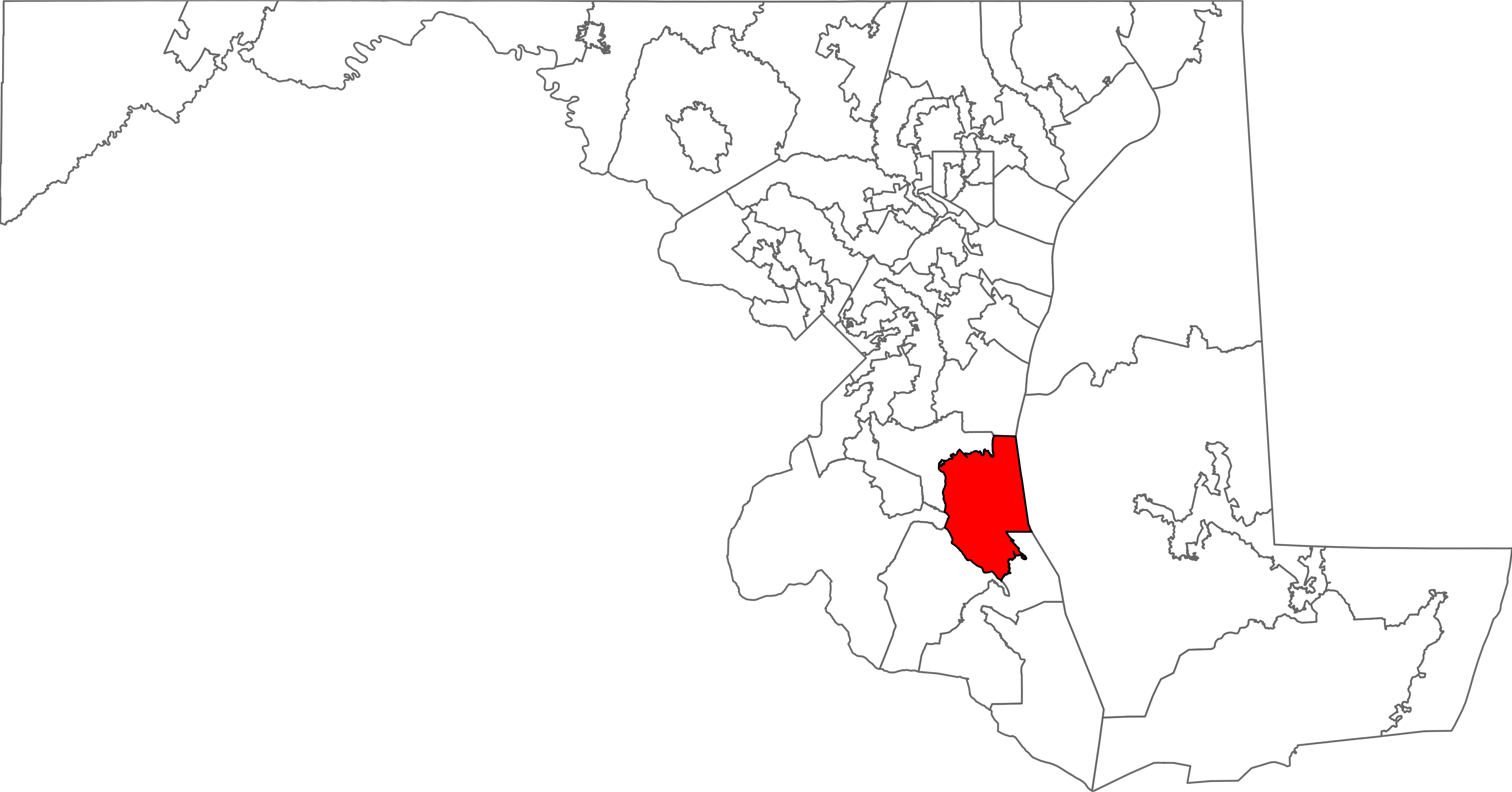
- Delegate(s): Mark N. Fisher (R)
- Registration: 40.5% Republican; 36.9% Democratic; 21.2% unaffiliated
- Demographics: 75.0% White; 13.4% Black/African American; 0.3% Native American; 1.5% Asian; 0.1% Hawaiian/Pacific Islander; 1.5% Other race; 8.2% Two or more races; 4.6% Hispanic
- Population (2020): 45,470
- Voting-age population: 34,610
- Registered voters: 32,933

Maryland House of Delegates District 27C is one of the 71 districts that compose the Maryland House of Delegates. Along with subdistricts 27A and 27B, it makes up the 27th district of the Maryland Senate. District 27C includes part of Calvert County, and is represented by one delegate.

== Demographic characteristics ==
As of the 2020 United States census, the district had a population of 45,470, of whom 34,610 (76.1%) were of voting age. The racial makeup of the district was 34,085 (75.0%) White, 6,081 (13.4%) African American, 147 (0.3%) Native American, 677 (1.5%) Asian, 27 (0.1%) Pacific Islander, 683 (1.5%) from some other race, and 3,745 (8.2%) from two or more races. Hispanic or Latino of any race were 2,102 (4.6%) of the population.

The district had 32,933 registered voters as of October 17, 2020, of whom 6,973 (21.2%) were registered as unaffiliated, 13,330 (40.5%) were registered as Republicans, 12,160 (36.9%) were registered as Democrats, and 273 (0.8%) were registered to other parties.

== Past Election Results ==
=== 2014 ===
Name	Party	Votes	Percent	Outcome
Mark N. Fisher	Republican	9,019	58.1%	Won
Sue Kullen	Democratic	6,489	41.8%	Lost
Other Write-Ins		12	0.1%	

=== 2018 ===
Name	Party	Votes	Percent	Outcome
Mark N. Fisher	Republican	10,563	55.8%	Won
Jason T. Fowler	Democratic	8,349	44.1%	Lost
Other Write-Ins		11	0.1%	
