= Maryland House of Delegates District 27B =

American legislative district

Maryland's legislative district 27B
- Represents parts of Calvert County and Prince George's County
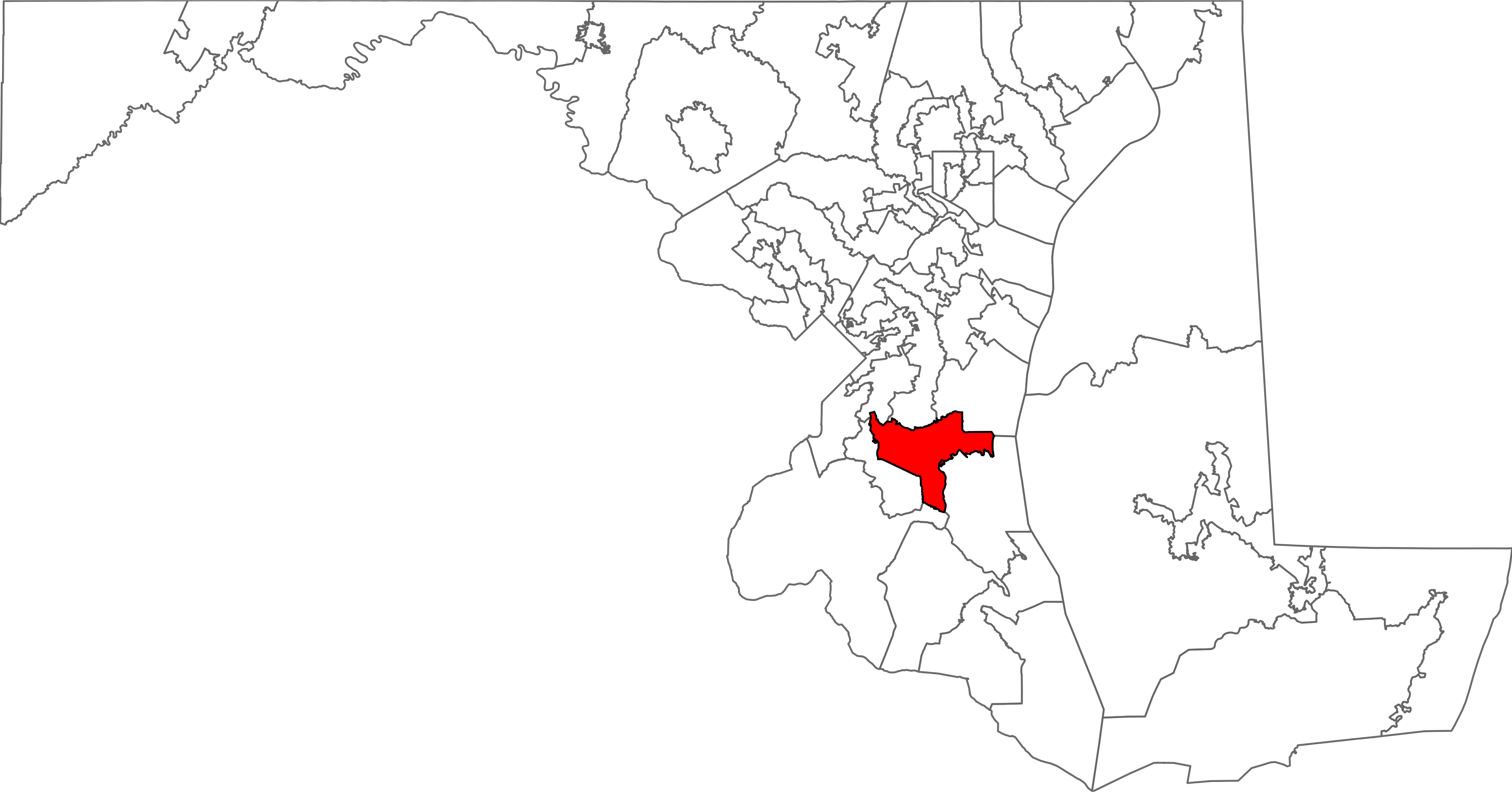
- Delegate(s): Jeffrie Long Jr. (D)
- Registration: 53.4% Democratic; 28.8% Republican; 16.0% unaffiliated
- Demographics: 50.1% White; 37.1% Black/African American; 0.4% Native American; 2.0% Asian; 0.1% Hawaiian/Pacific Islander; 2.8% Other race; 7.5% Two or more races; 6.3% Hispanic
- Population (2020): 45,496
- Voting-age population: 35,379
- Registered voters: 35,750

Maryland House of Delegates District 27B is one of the 71 districts that compose the Maryland House of Delegates. Along with subdistricts 27A and 27C, it makes up the 27th district of the Maryland Senate. District 27B includes parts of Calvert County and Prince George's County, and is represented by one delegate.

== Demographic characteristics ==
As of the 2020 United States census, the district had a population of 45,496, of whom 35,379 (77.8%) were of voting age. The racial makeup of the district was 22,804 (50.1%) White, 16,887 (37.1%) African American, 178 (0.4%) Native American, 912 (2.0%) Asian, 47 (0.1%) Pacific Islander, 1,252 (2.8%) from some other race, and 3,431 (7.5%) from two or more races. Hispanic or Latino of any race were 2,847 (6.3%) of the population.

The district had 35,750 registered voters as of October 17, 2020, of whom 5,730 (16.0%) were registered as unaffiliated, 10,295 (28.8%) were registered as Republicans, 19,097 (53.4%) were registered as Democrats, and 449 (1.3%) were registered to other parties.

== History ==
District 27B represented parts of Anne Arundel County and Calvert County up until the 1998 election. From the election of 2002 to the election of 2010, District 27B represented only Calvert County.

== Past Election Results ==
=== 1998 ===
Name	Party	Votes	Percent	Outcome
George W. Owings III	Democratic	7,603	57.0%	Won
Joseph J. Rooney	Republican	5,791	43.0%	Lost

=== 2002 ===
Name	Party	Votes	Percent	Outcome
George W. Owings III	Democratic	9,753	98.1%	Won
Other Write-Ins		191	1.9%	

=== 2006 ===
Name	Party	Votes	Percent	Outcome
Sue Kullen	Democratic	8,236	56.8%	Won
David Hale	Republican	6,250	43.1%	Lost
Other Write-Ins		9	0.1%	

=== 2010 ===
Name	Party	Votes	Percent	Outcome
Mark N. Fisher	Republican	8,141	52.6%	Won
Sue Kullen	Democratic	7,336	47.4%	Lost
Other Write-Ins		6	0.0%	

=== 2014 ===
Name	Party	Votes	Percent	Outcome
Michael A. Jackson	Democratic	8,434	52.4%	Won
Philip A. Parenti	Republican	7,637	47.5%	Lost
Other Write-Ins		23	0.1%	

=== 2018 ===
Name	Party	Votes	Percent	Outcome
Michael A. Jackson	Democratic	12,335	59.3%	Won
Michael A. Thomas	Republican	8,437	40.6%	Lost
Other Write-Ins		24	0.1%	
