= Rachel Jones (Maryland politician) =

American politician from Maryland

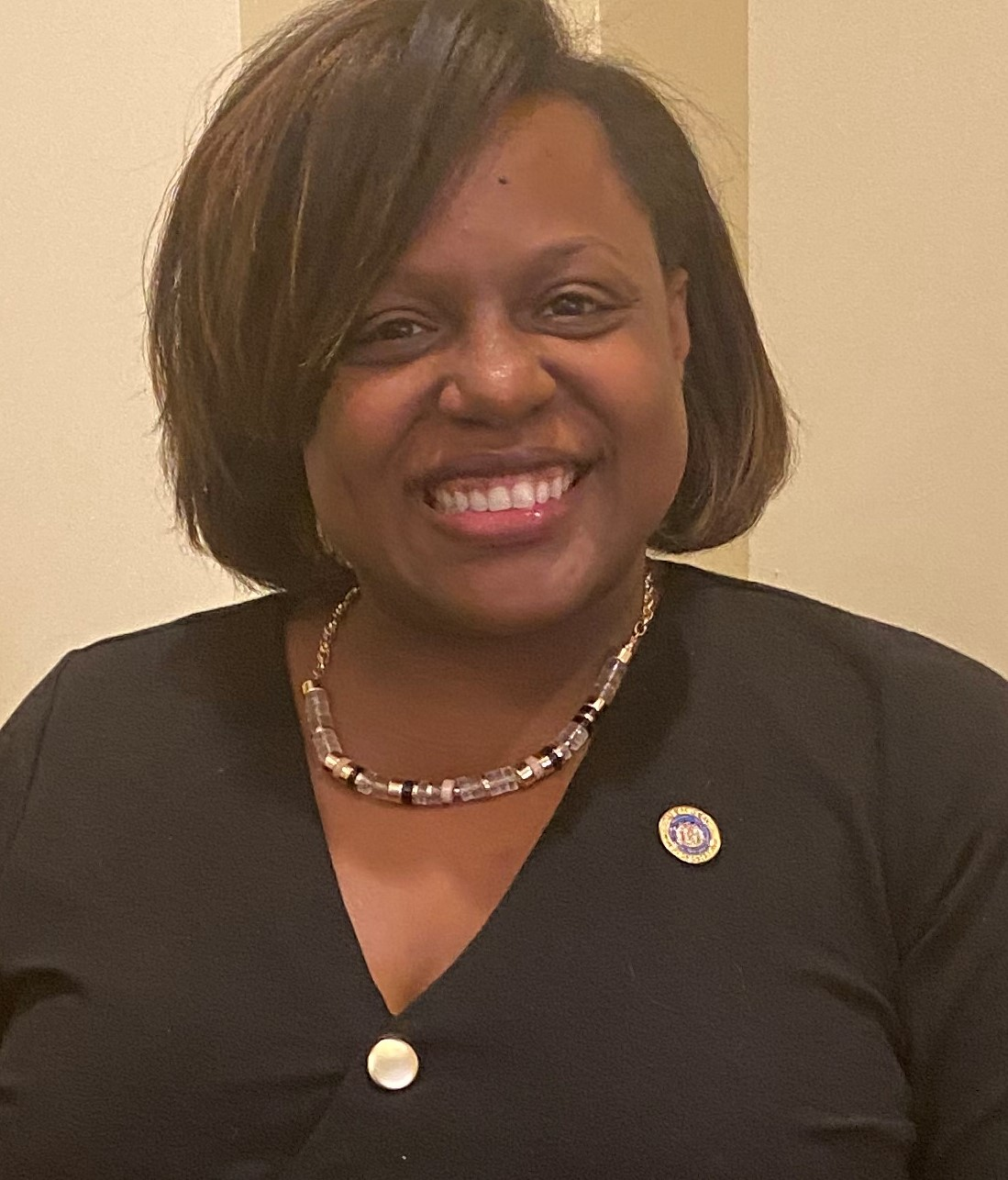

Member of the Maryland House of Delegates from the 27B district
- In office February 17, 2021 – January 11, 2023
- Appointed by: Larry Hogan
- Preceded by: Michael Jackson
- Succeeded by: Jeffrie Long Jr.
- Constituency: Calvert County, Maryland and Prince George's County, Maryland

Personal details
- Born: December 18, 1984 (age 41) Prince Frederick, Maryland
- Party: Democratic
- Children: 2
- Education: Morgan State University, B.A. (government & political science), 2007
- Website: Official website

Rachel Renee Jones (born December 18, 1984) is an American politician who served in the Maryland House of Delegates from District 27B from February 18, 2021, to January 11, 2023. She is a member of the Democratic Party.

== Biography ==
Rachel Jones is an American politician who represented District 27B in the Maryland House of Delegates. She was appointed by Maryland Governor Larry Hogan to finish the term of Michael Jackson who had been appointed to the Maryland State Senate to fill the vacancy created when Senate President Thomas V. Miller Jr. resigned.

Jones was born in Prince Frederick, Maryland, December 18, 1984. She graduated from Calvert High School in 2002 and matriculated to Morgan State University. By 2007 she had completed her studies and was awarded a Bachelor of Sciences degree in political science.

From 2013 to 2016, Jones served as a Field Representative and assistant to US Senator Barbara Mikulski. In 2016, Jones served as a field assistant to US Senator Ben Cardin.

Jones ran for her seat in the 2022 gubernatorial elections, losing in the Democratic primary to current Delegate Jeffrie Long Jr. After she left office in 2023, she became the government relations director for the Maryland Department of Agriculture.

== Personal life ==
Jones has two children, including a son with autism.
