= Susie Proctor =

American politician

Elizabeth G. (Susie) Proctor
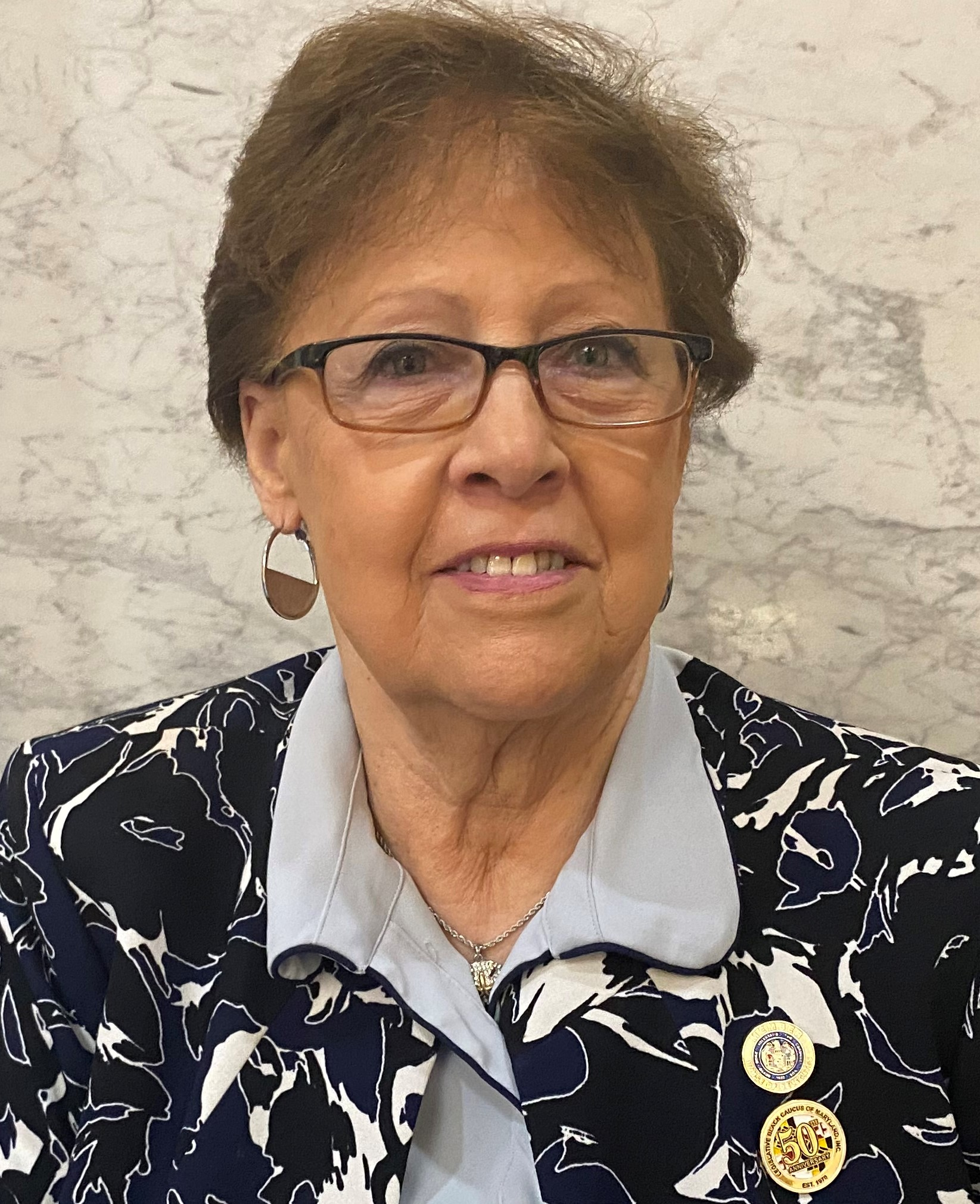

Member of the Maryland House of Delegates from the 27A district
- In office October 30, 2015 – January 11, 2023
- Preceded by: James E. Proctor Jr.
- Succeeded by: Kevin Harris
- Constituency: Charles County and Prince George's County

Personal details
- Born: September 15, 1940 (age 86)
- Party: Democratic
- Spouse: James E. Proctor Jr. (m. 1961; died 2015)
- Children: Two children, three grandchildren
- Education: Bowie State College
- Occupation: Educator

Elizabeth Gwendolyn Proctor (born September 15, 1940) is an American politician who represented district 27A in the Maryland House of Delegates.

== Background ==
Proctor's professional career was in education. She graduated from Frederick Douglass High School in Upper Marlboro and later attended Bowie State University, where she earned a bachelor's degree in education in 1962 and then a master's degree in special education in 1973. She worked as a special education teacher in the public schools of Prince George's County from 1962 to 1977. She also served as the head of the legislative committee of the Prince George's County Teacher's Association in 1999. The Proctors have two children; three grandchildren.

== In the Legislature ==
Proctor was appointed by Maryland Governor Larry Hogan on October 9, 2015, to fill the seat in the Maryland House of Delegates left vacant by her husband's death. She was sworn in on October 30, 2015.

=== Committee assignments ===
- Member, Appropriations Committee, 2019–2023 (health & social services subcommittee, 2019; chair, oversight committee on pensions, 2021–2023, member, 2019–2023; capital budget subcommittee, 2020-; vice-chair, public safety & administration subcommittee, 2020–2023; chair, oversight committee on pensions, 2021–2023, member, 2019–2023)
- Joint Committee on the Management of Public Funds, 2019–2023
- Joint Audit and Evaluation Committee, 2021–2023
- Member, Judiciary Committee, 2015–2018 (juvenile law subcommittee, 2016–2018)

=== Other memberships ===
- Member, Law Enforcement Committee, Prince George's County Delegation, 2017–2023
- Member, Legislative Black Caucus of Maryland, 2015–2023
- Member, Women Legislators of Maryland, 2015–2023
- Member, Fire/EMS Caucus, 2017–2023
- Member, Maryland Veterans Caucus, 2017–2023

== Political positions ==
=== Education ===
Proctor supports raising teacher wages and building new schools in Charles County. Like her husband, she supports proposals to build a recreation center in the southern part of Prince George's County.

In 2022, Proctor opposed legislation to break up the College of Southern Maryland to create a new Charles County Community College.

=== Social issues ===
In January 2019, Proctor voted in favor of legislation to lift a ban on developer contributions to candidates running in county executive and county council races in Prince George's County. She also voted in favor of legislation that would provide palliative care to terminally ill adults, which passed the House of Delegates by a vote of 74-66.

== Electoral history ==
Maryland House of Delegates District 27A Democratic Primary Election, 2018
Party	Candidate	Votes	%
Democratic	Susie Proctor	3,971	55.4
Democratic	Lynn Jackson	1,408	19.6
Democratic	Joe Spears, Jr.	1,302	18.2
Democratic	Ronald McDaniel, Jr.	487	6.8

Maryland House of Delegates District 27A Election, 2018
Party	Candidate	Votes	%
Democratic	Susie Proctor	17,534	98.2
Write-In		322	1.8
