= James E. Proctor Jr. =

American politician (1936-2015)

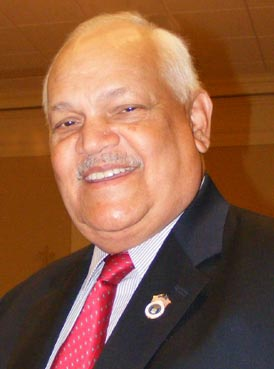

Member of the Maryland House of Delegates from the 27A district
- In office May 1990 – September 2015
- Preceded by: William R. McCaffrey
- Succeeded by: Elizabeth G. (Susie) Proctor

Personal details
- Born: James Edward Proctor Jr. June 14, 1936 Washington, D.C., U.S.
- Died: September 10, 2015 (aged 79) Washington, D.C.
- Party: Democratic
- Spouse: Elizabeth G. Proctor

James Edward Proctor Jr. (June 14, 1936 – September 10, 2015) was an American politician who represented district 27A in the Maryland House of Delegates.

== Background ==
James Proctor was born in Washington, D.C., on June 14, 1936. He grew up in Washington and attended Dunbar High School. He served in U.S. Air Force from 1961 to 1962 and again in 1968. Following the service he entered Bowie State College and earned his B.S. in elementary education in 1969, and then his M.Ed in 1972. After 17 years as a secondary school principal, Proctor retired from the education arena and devoted himself full-time to the political arena. He died on September 10, 2015, of heart disease.

== In the legislature ==
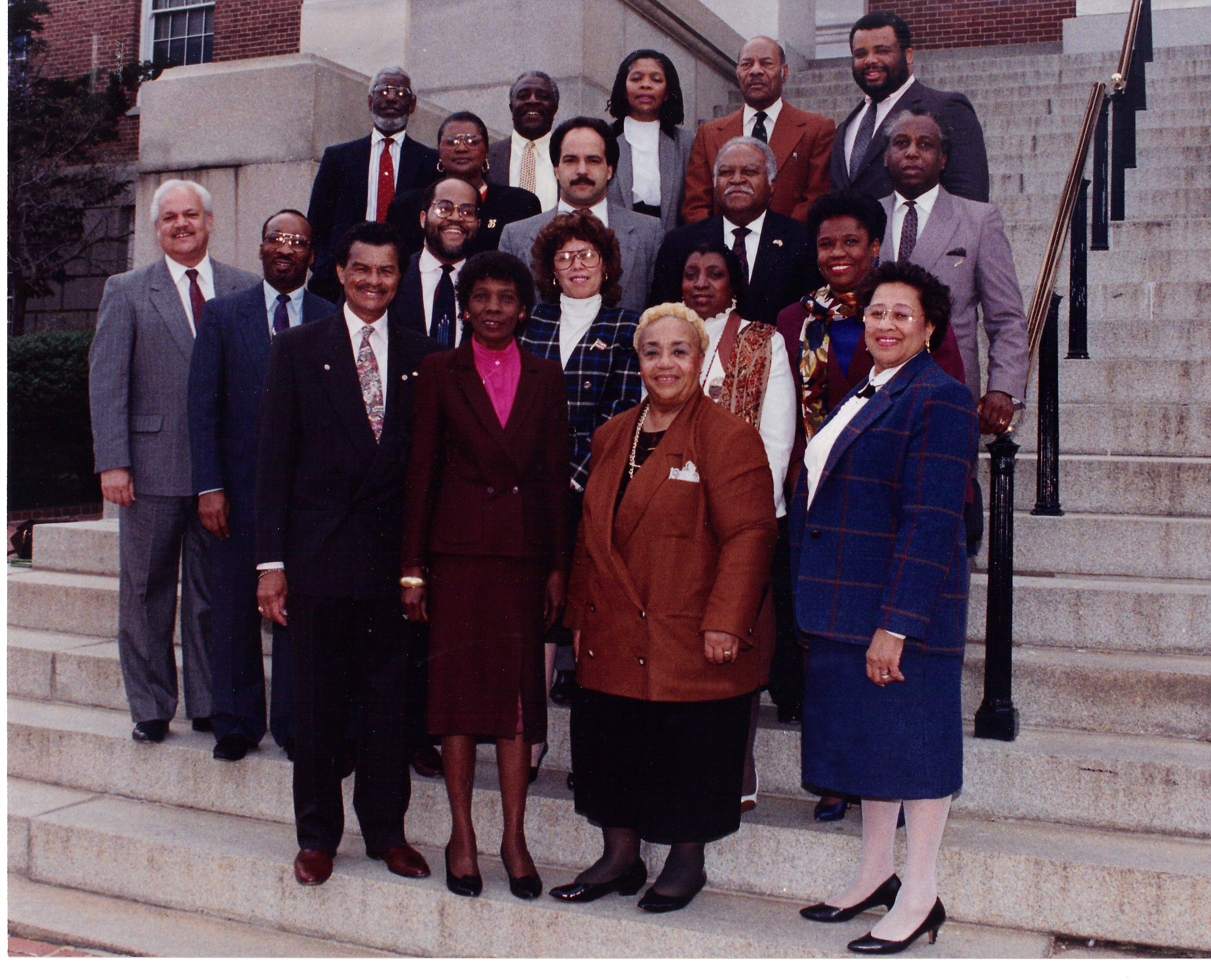
Proctor (far left) with the 1992 Legislative Black Caucus of Maryland

Proctor became a member of the House of Delegates in May 1990 when he was appointed to fill the vacancy caused when Delegate William R. McCaffrey retired. He served on the Rules and Executive Nominations Committee, the Spending Affordability Committee and was a member of the Legislative Black Caucus of Maryland. He also served as the vice-chairman of the House Appropriations Committee until his death in 2015.

His widow, Elizabeth G. (Susie) Proctor, was appointed to his seat by Maryland Governor Larry Hogan on October 9, 2015.

== Personal life ==
Proctor was Catholic.

== Election results ==
=== 2006 ===
Voters to choose two:

Name	Votes	Percent	Outcome
James E. Proctor Jr., Democratic	19,829	40.3%	Won
Joseph F. Vallario Jr., Democratic	18,677	38.0%	Won
Kenneth S. Brown, Democratic	5,687	11.6%	Lost
Antoinette "Toni" Jarboe-Duley, Democratic	4,948	10.1%	Lost
