= Mark N. Fisher =

American politician (born 1962)

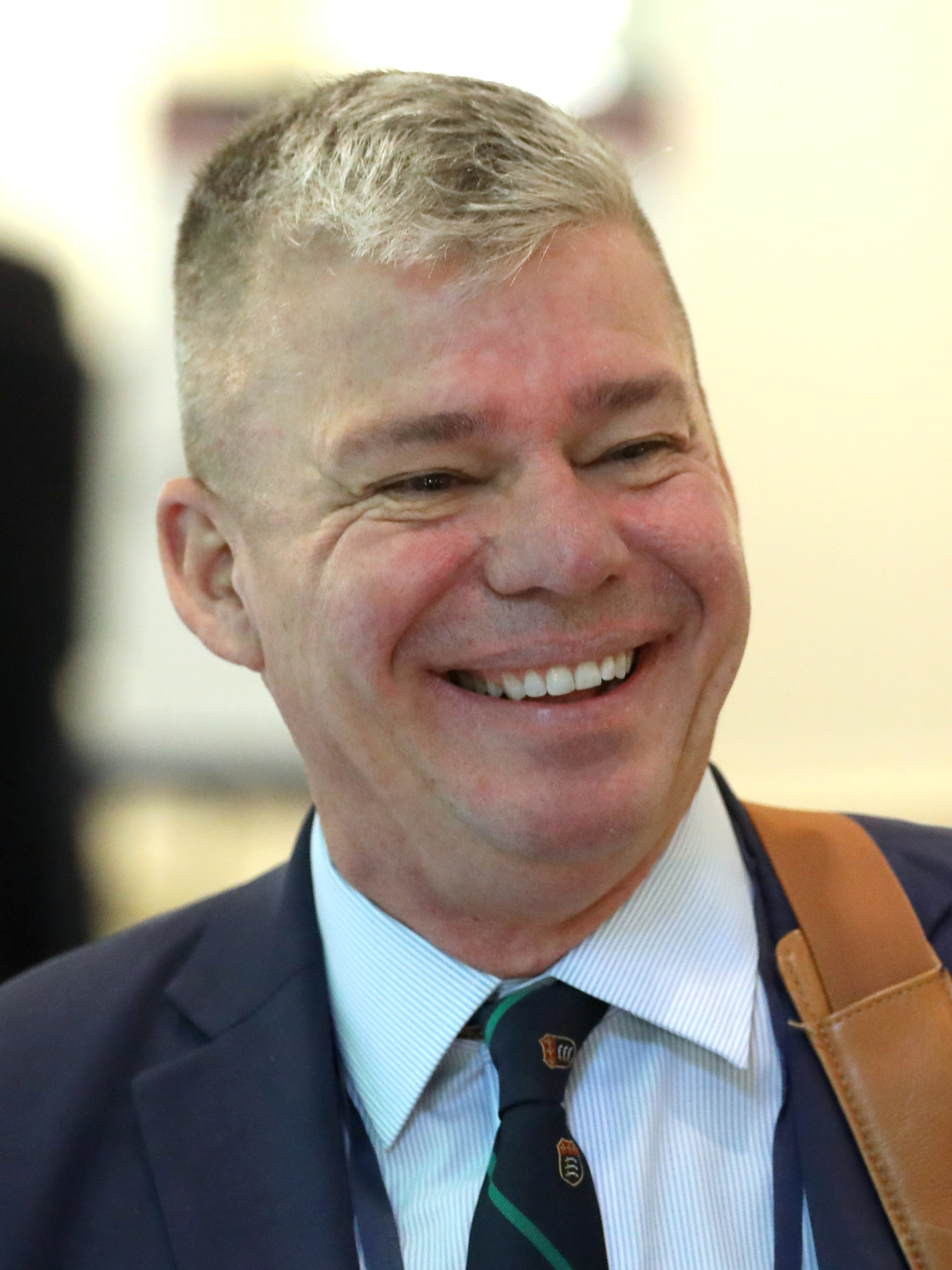
- Fisher in 2023

Member of the Maryland House of Delegates
- Incumbent
- Assumed office January 12, 2011
- Preceded by: Sue Kullen (27B)
- Succeeded by: Michael A. Jackson (27B)
- Constituency: District 27B (2011–2015); District 27C (2015–present)

Personal details
- Born: Mark Nicholas Fisher; August 3, 1962 (age 64) Baltimore, Maryland, U.S.
- Party: Republican
- Spouse: Deena
- Children: 3

Mark Nicholas Fisher (born August 3, 1962) is an American politician who represents District 27C in the Maryland House of Delegates, which covers parts of Calvert County. He previously represented District 27B from 2011 to 2015. He also hosts a podcast called Mark and the Millennials, which explores the divide between conservative millennials and the baby boomer generation.

== Early life and education ==
Fisher was born in Baltimore. He attended George Washington University, where he earned a B.A. in international affairs and economics. After graduating, he became a managing member of telecommunications infrastructure company Telecom Capital Group LLC. In 2003, Fisher founded Gray's Field Foundation, a nonprofit group to fund the preservation of a baseball field in Owings, Maryland.

Fisher is a Catholic. He is married and has three children, and lives in Prince Frederick, Maryland.

== In the legislature ==
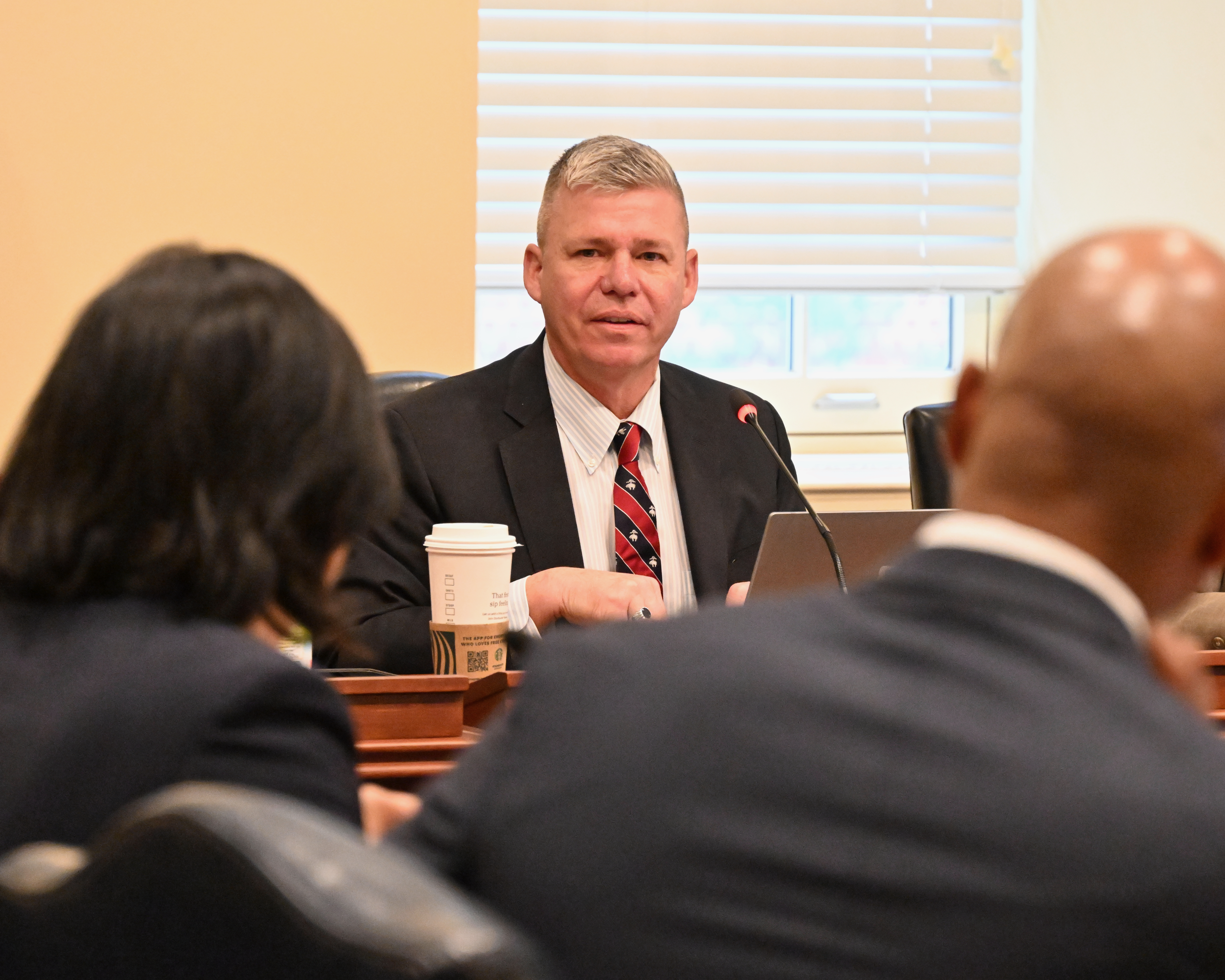
Fisher in the Economic Matters Committee, 2023

Fisher ran for the Maryland House of Delegates in District 27B in 2010, challenging incumbent Democratic legislator Sue Kullen. In an upset, he defeated Kullen in the general election with 52.6 percent of the vote. He was sworn in on January 12, 2011. He was a member of the House Ways and Means Committee from 2011 to 2015, afterwards serving on the House Economic Matters committee until 2027. At the start of the 2027 legislative session, Fisher was assigned to the House Judiciary Committee. A founding member of the Maryland Freedom Caucus, Maryland Matters has described Fisher as one of the most vocal conservatives in the House of Delegates.

During the 2021 legislative session, Fisher spoke against the state's new legislative redistricting map, claiming that Democrats had gerrymandered multiple districts in Anne Arundel County to benefit the party. After the Maryland General Assembly passed the new maps, Fisher joined the lawsuit against the new maps and argued that his own district was gerrymandered, citing that it was drawn into Prince George's County. The Supreme Court of Maryland ruled that the new maps did not violate the state constitution in April 2022.

During the 2025 legislative session, Fisher and other members of the Maryland Freedom Caucus forced a vote on whether the House of Delegates should hold pro forma sessions during the early weeks of the legislature; the vote failed 99–35, with two Republicans joining all Democrats in keeping the pro forma sessions as scheduled. The following day, Fisher attended a pro forma session and sought to raise a question on whether a quorum is present, but was not recognized by House Speaker Adrienne A. Jones, who gaveled the session to a close. Afterwards, Fisher called out to Jones from the House floor to raise questions about the constitutionality of pro forma sessions, arguing that the abbreviated sessions violated a section of the Constitution of Maryland that requires a "quorum of the majority" of members of the House of Delegates to hold a floor session. Jones acknowledged that she did not recognize Fisher during the session and that pro forma sessions were allowed under the House rules, which states that "a quorum is deemed present" for a pro forma session when the speaker and party leaders are present.

In May 2026, House Speaker Joseline Peña-Melnyk wrote to Fisher and state delegate Brian Chisholm to apologize and remove an episode of Fisher's "Dumbest Bill in America" video series in which the lawmakers accused Chinese-born state delegate Chao Wu of being a "Chinese communist spy", frequently using the derogatory term "Chicom", and questioned his motive for introducing a bill to require data transparency in AI training. During the episode, Fisher defended his accusations by citing a Washington Examiner article alleging that Wu served as the president of the University of Maryland, College Park's chapter of the Chinese Students and Scholars Association, and by citing Wu's resumé, which included stints at the Food and Drug Administration, defense contractor Maryland Aerospace, and various entities that worked on drones. He also questioned how Wu got elected to the House of Delegates, saying that he could "barely understand what he's saying" because of his accent. The legislators' comments were also condemned by the Legislative Black Caucus of Maryland, the Maryland Asian American and Pacific Islander Caucus, and House minority leader Jason Buckel. In response, the Maryland Freedom Caucus released a statement criticizing Peña-Melnyk for "sending private letters policing podcasts and using CCP-style speech tactics" against caucus members. A spokesperson for Peña-Melnyk dismissed the Freedom Caucus's statement, calling it a "deflection tactic to avoid taking accountability for their deeply troubling comments". In the 2026 elections, the Maryland Legislative Asian American and Pacific Islander Caucus targeted Chisholm and Fisher, citing their xenophobic comments toward Wu.

== Political positions ==
=== Economic issues ===
During the 2013 legislative session, Fisher voted against a bill to index the state's gas taxes to inflation. In 2022, following a spike in gas prices as the result of the Russo-Ukrainian War, Fisher said he supported holding a special legislative session to suspend gas and electric taxes, eliminate retirement income and business property taxes, and lower the income tax rate.

In February 2014, Fisher criticized Media Rights Capital, the production company behind House of Cards, for threatening to leave the state unless it was given millions of dollars in tax credits, calling it "ransom".

In March 2014, Fisher voted against a bill that would raise the state minimum wage to $10.10/hour. He also introduced an amendment to this bill that would exempt all businesses with 50 or fewer employees from the minimum wage increase, which would fail by a 45–88 vote. In 2019, he voted against a bill that would raise the state minimum wage to $15/hour, calling it "socialism". During the 2016 legislative session, Fisher voted against a bill requiring employers to provide workers with seven days of paid sick leave per year, arguing it would cause restaurants to automate low-paying jobs.

In March 2020, Fisher introduced an amendment to House Bill 932, which would implement a sales tax on digital services, that would have exempted educational products from the tax on the basis that the generated revenue would be going to the Blueprint for Maryland's Future. The amendment failed along party lines.

During the 2023 legislative session, Fisher introduced a bill to ban people or businesses associated with the Government of China from buying farmland in Maryland.

During the 2025 legislative session, Fisher opposed the compromise budget proposal negotiated by Governor Wes Moore and legislative leaders that included over $1 billion in new tax increases but $2 billion in spending cuts, organizing a rally against the budget's tax increases alongside other members of the Maryland Freedom Caucus. In March 2025, during debate on the budget, Fisher said that businesses should avoid Maryland and called on small businesses to leave the state because "[t]he Democrat Party sees you as an ATM machine, and they will never stop until such time as they have the perfect socialist government that will then collapse upon itself, because there is no revenue left". Moore criticized Fisher's comments as "embarrassing and disappointing" and called on Fisher issue an apology to Calvert County residents, to which Fisher responded by doubling down on his comments.

=== Education ===
During the 2011 legislative session, Fisher voted against Maryland's Dream Act, which provided in-state tuition to undocumented immigrants.

In March 2019, Fisher introduced an amendment to the Maryland state budget that would restrict $1 million of the University System of Maryland budget until completion of a report to facilitate the exercise of First Amendment rights on campus. The amendment failed by a vote of 42–96.

In March 2020, Fisher introduced an amendment to the Blueprint for Maryland's Future (HB1300) that would allow students attending "failing schools" to transfer to an "alternative school" within the same county. His amendment was rejected by a vote of 41–93. He opposes the Blueprint, saying that he would support "suspending and rewriting" the bill because of its cost.

In April 2023, Fisher sent a letter to State Superintendent Mohammed Choudhury accusing the Maryland State Department of Education of hiding scores from failing scores by altering data files available on the department's website. An investigation conducted by the state inspector general found no evidence of these claims.

=== Energy ===
Fisher's district includes the Calvert Cliffs Nuclear Power Plant, Maryland's only nuclear power plant.

In March 2019, Fisher introduced legislation to include nuclear as a Tier 1 Fuel that could be used as part of the state's renewable portfolio. He later amended his bill to instead mandate a study on the future of the nuclear industry in Maryland, causing it to pass the House Economic Matters Committee by a vote of 20–1. The bill passed the House of Delegates by a vote of 102–34, but did not receive a vote in the Senate.

In February 2021, Fisher suggested that investing in the nuclear power industry could be a solution to the climate crisis, arguing that there is not enough solar or wind infrastructure to address the climate emergency. He advocated for nuclear power investments in the Climate Solutions Now Act of 2021.

In February 2026, during debate a bill that would prohibit investor-owned utilities from paying employee bonuses and supervisor compensation with ratepayer dollars, Fisher introduced an amendment that would require utilities to itemize all charges for consumers, saying it would make clear to ratepayers how much they are paying because of policies passed by the Maryland General Assembly, in particular those to expand the use of renewable energy in the state. The amendment was rejected.

=== Environment ===
In March 2020, Fisher voted against a bill that would prohibit stores from providing customers with plastic bags, calling it "Stalinist". He voted against the bill again when it was reintroduced in 2021.

In 2021, Fisher introduced a bill that would have prevented elected officials at the state and local level from using the government's electric vehicle charging stations without paying for it. Democrats on the House Environment and Transportation Committee rewrote his bill to allow state employees and local elected officials free access to the charging stations for their personal vehicles. The committee then voted 17–5 to approve the changes and brought the bill to the House floor for debate, where Fisher proposed an amendment that would revert the bill back to its original state. His amendment was rejected by a vote of 47–80.

During the 2022 legislative session, Fisher said he opposed the Climate Solutions Now Act, calling it a "takeover of the economy".

=== Gun policy ===
During the 2013 legislative session, Fisher voted against the Firearm Safety Act of 2013, a bill that placed restrictions on firearm purchases and magazine capacity in semi-automatic rifles.

=== Health policy ===
Fisher opposed legislation to establish the Prescription Drug Affordability Board, suggesting it was a "price control" bill. During the 2024 legislative session, he opposed a bill that would allow undocumented immigrants to buy their own health insurance.

=== National politics ===
Fisher has criticized the indictments against Donald Trump, predicting that the United States would "devolve into a banana republic". In May 2024, he signed onto a letter condemning the jury's guilty verdict in the Trump hush money trial, calling the ruling a "political prosecution from a kangaroo court and left-leaning prosecutor" that is turning the U.S. justice system into a "third world parody of law and order".

=== Social issues ===
Fisher opposed a bill to add an amendment codifying abortion access rights to the Constitution of Maryland.

During the 2023 legislative session, Fisher opposed the Trans Health Equity Act, a bill that would require the state's Medicaid program to cover gender-affirming treatment, comparing transgender healthcare to "child mutilation" and the book Brave New World, and calling it a violation of human rights. He introduced an amendment to the bill to allow cancer victims to have their ovum frozen, which was rejected by the legislature.

== Electoral history ==
Maryland House of Delegates District 27B Republican primary election, 2010
Party	Candidate	Votes	%
Republican	Mark N. Fisher	1,816	64.8
Republican	Bob Schaefer	756	27.0
Republican	Mike Blasey	230	8.2

Maryland House of Delegates District 27B election, 2010
Party	Candidate	Votes	%
Republican	Mark N. Fisher	8,141	52.6
Democratic	Sue Kullen (incumbent)	7,336	47.4
Write-in		6	0.0

Maryland House of Delegates District 27C election, 2014
Party	Candidate	Votes	%
Republican	Mark N. Fisher (incumbent)	9,019	58.1
Democratic	Sue Kullen	6,489	41.8
Write-in		12	0.1

Maryland House of Delegates District 27C election, 2018
Party	Candidate	Votes	%
Republican	Mark N. Fisher (incumbent)	10,563	55.8
Democratic	Jason T. Fowler	8,349	44.1
Write-in		11	0.1

Maryland House of Delegates District 27C election, 2022
Party	Candidate	Votes	%
Republican	Mark N. Fisher (incumbent)	13,474	95.7
Write-in		610	4.3
