= Joseph F. Vallario Jr. =

American politician

Joseph Vallario
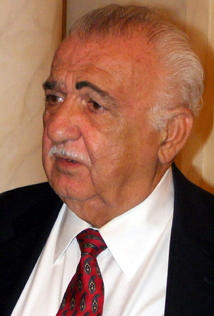

Member of the Maryland House of Delegates from the 23B district
- In office January 7, 1975 – January 9, 2019
- Succeeded by: Ron Watson

Personal details
- Born: March 4, 1937 (age 89) Washington, D.C., U.S.
- Party: Democratic
- Children: 6
- Education: Benjamin Franklin University; Eastern College; Mount Vernon School of Law
- Occupation: Politician; lawyer

Joseph F. Vallario Jr. (born March 4, 1937) is an American politician who represented district 23B in the Maryland House of Delegates and was the chairman of the House Judiciary Committee. Vallario was first elected in 1974 and was the longest serving chairman in the Maryland General Assembly.

== Background ==
Vallario attended Washington, DC, parochial schools, the Benjamin Franklin University (since merged into George Washington University), B.C.S. (commercial science) and M.C.S. (commercial science), 1959; Eastern College, and the Mt. Vernon School of Law, LL.B., J.D., 1963 (Now the University of Baltimore School of Law). Admitted to Maryland Bar in 1964, he is an attorney and a member of the American and Maryland State Bar Associations. Vallario is a past president of the Prince George's County Criminal Trial Lawyers Association and a member of the Order of Sons of Italy in America.

He was featured in the Netflix documentary, "The Keepers," for his role in being opposed to a bill seeking to increase the statute of limitations of sexual abuse victims.

== Legislative career ==
Delegate Vallario had been the Chairman of the Judiciary Committee since 1993 and a member of the Rules and Executive Nominations Committee, also since 1993. He served on the Legislative Policy Committee, the Article 27 (crimes & punishments) Revision Committee and is a past member of the Joint Committee on Legislative Ethics, the Drunk and Drugged Driving Task Force (1988–90), the Joint Task Force on Maryland's Procurement Law (1993–94), and the Joint Committee on the Selection of the State Treasurer (1996 & 2002). He was the Co-Chair of the Task Force to Examine Crime Victims' Rights Laws in Maryland (1996–2003), a member of the Special Committee on Gaming (2001), a member of the Maryland State Commission on Criminal Sentencing Policy and the past chair, Prince George's County Delegation. National Conference of State Legislatures (law & criminal justice committee). Vallario has been an active supporter of victims rights as well as a proponent for strengthening Maryland's laws against child predators. He has opposed legalizing same-sex marriage, but in March 2011 he voted as chairman for a bill to do just that in the Judiciary Committee. He was criticized for that vote, with Del. Michael D. Smigiel, Sr. saying, "The chairman did what he was told. That's why he's chairman." Vallario was attacked in a lengthy Washington Post article published August 3, 2013, for his conflict of interest in having legally represented many drunken drivers and then using his Chairman position to pardon them.

=== Legislative notes ===
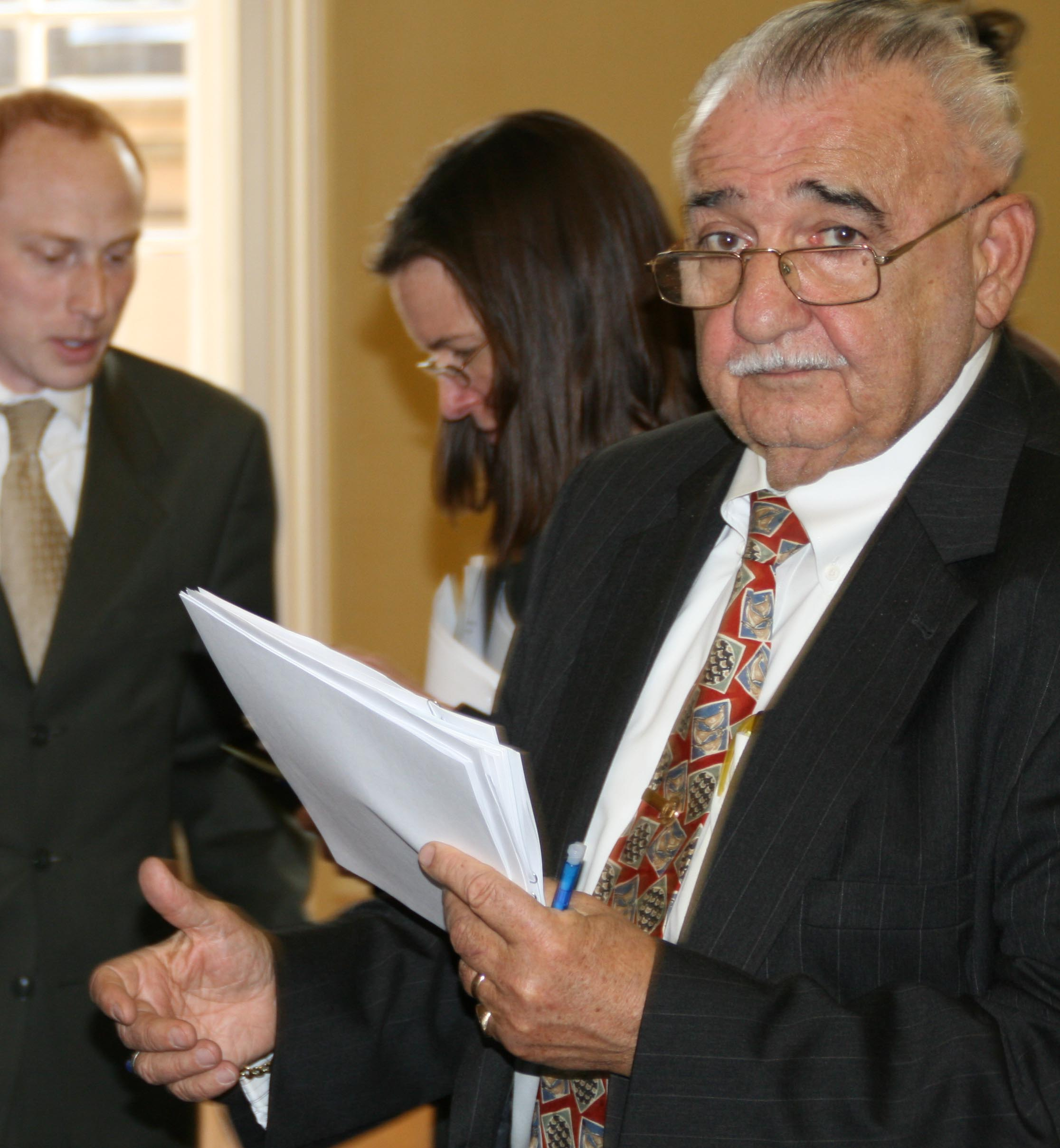
Chairman Vallario during 11th hour committee meeting, 2009 session of the Maryland General Assembly

==== 2013 ====
- refused to allow a vote on a bill decriminalizing possession of small amounts of marijuana, claiming "Bad message to the kids." The bill would have subjected people caught with 10 grams or less to a civil fine of $100.

==== 2008 ====
- co-sponsor of HB6, requiring custodial interrogations in capital cases be recorded.(became law Chapter 360)

==== 2006 ====
- voted for Healthy Air Act in 2006 (SB154)

==== 2005 ====
- voted against slot machines in 2005 (HB1361)
- voted for "No-Knock" Warrants (HB557), (became law Chapter 560)

==== 1998 ====
- voted for income tax reduction in 1998 (SB750)

== Awards and honors ==
- 2010 Most Influential Maryland Legislators (Top 20)

== Election results ==
=== 2006 General election results, District 27A ===
Voters to choose two:

Name	Votes	Percent	Outcome
James E. Proctor Jr., Democratic	19,829	40.3%	Won
Joseph F. Vallario Jr., Democratic	18,677	38.0%	Won
Kenneth S. Brown, Democratic	5,687	11.6%	Lost
Antoinette "Toni" Jarboe-Duley, Democratic	4,948	10.1%	Lost
Other write-ins	48	.1%	

Vallario lost in the primary election held on June 26, 2018.
