= Darrell Odom =

American politician

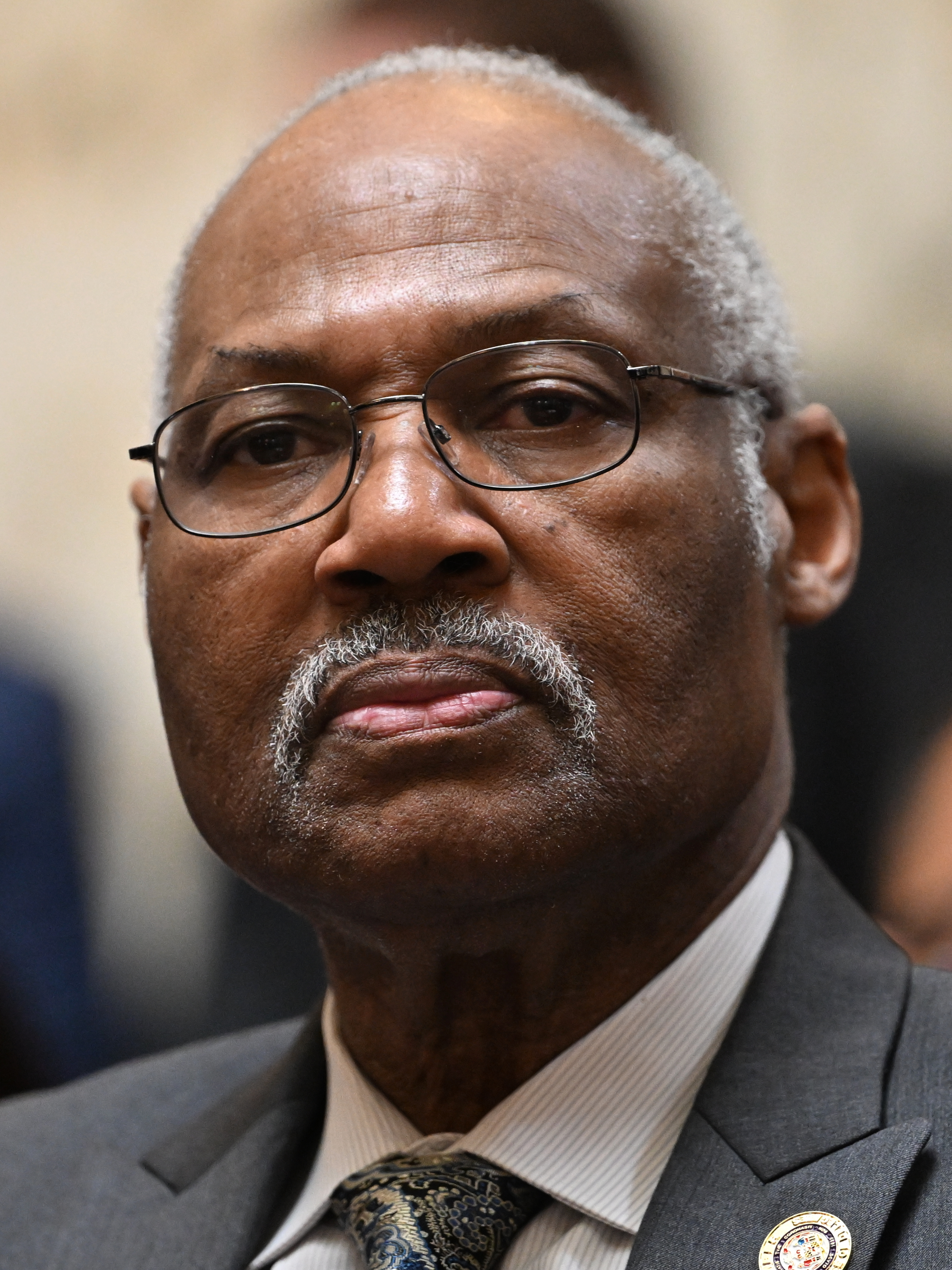
- Odom in 2026

Member of the Maryland House of Delegates from the 27A district
- Incumbent
- Assumed office January 13, 2026
- Appointed by: Wes Moore
- Preceded by: Kevin Harris

Personal details
- Born: 1954 or 1955 (age 71–72)
- Party: Democratic
- Education: Prince George's Community College (AA); University of Maryland Global Campus (BS)

Military service
- Branch/service: U.S. Army; U.S. Coast Guard

Darrell C. Odom Sr. (born 1954 or 1955) is an American politician, firefighter, and military veteran who has served as a member of the Maryland House of Delegates from District 27A since 2026.

== Early life and education ==
Odom holds a bachelor's degree in fire science from the University of Maryland Global Campus and an associate degree from Prince George's Community College. He is also a graduate of the National Defense University's Keystone Command Senior Enlisted Leader Course.

== Career ==
Odom served with the Prince George's County Fire/EMS Department from 1980 to 2004, where he was responsible for managing the department and its implementation of the fire/EMS paramedic ambulance program. He retired as the department's acting chief. Odom also served in the U.S. Army for two years and the U.S. Coast Guard for 29 years, serving as the reserve command master chief for the Deployable Operations Group and retiring as a master chief maritime enforcement specialist.

Odom was a member of the Prince George's County Democratic Central Committee from 2019 to 2026. He was elected unopposed to the Prince George's County Democratic Central Committee in 2022.

== Maryland House of Delegates ==
In December 2025, after state delegate Kevin Harris was appointed to the Maryland Senate following the resignation of state senator Michael Jackson, Odom applied to serve the remainder of Harris's term in the Maryland House of Delegates. His candidacy was supported by Harris. The Prince George's County Democratic Central Committee voted 22–2 to nominate Odom on December 31, 2025, while the Charles County Democratic Central Committee voted 12–1–1 to nominate Charles County Board of Education chair Yonelle Moore Lee a few days later. Governor Wes Moore appointed Odom to the seat on January 12, 2026, and he was sworn in the next day. He was a member of the Environment and Transportation Committee until 2027, afterwards serving in the Judiciary Committee.

Odom is running for a full term in the Maryland House of Delegates. He narrowly won the Democratic primary on June 23, 2026, and faces Republican nominee Jim Crawford in the general election.
