= Jeffrie Long Jr. =

American politician (born 1996)

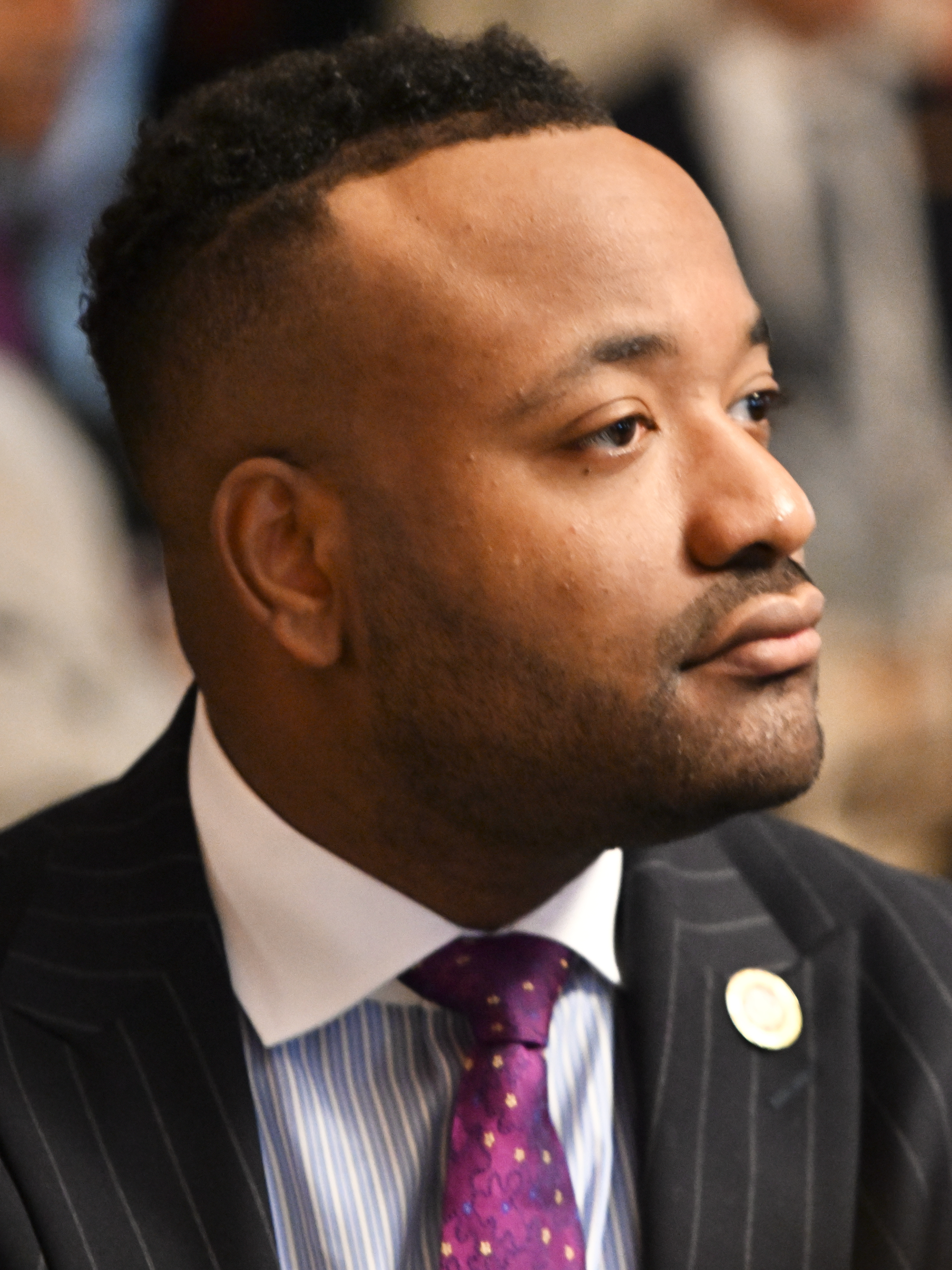
- Long in 2023

Member of the Maryland House of Delegates from the 27B district
- Incumbent
- Assumed office January 11, 2023
- Preceded by: Rachel Jones
- Constituency: Calvert County, Maryland and Prince George's County, Maryland

Personal details
- Born: November 12, 1996 (age 29) Prince Frederick, Maryland, U.S.
- Party: Democratic
- Education: Liberty University (BA)
- Occupation: Pastor
- Website: Campaign website

Jeffrie Eugene Long Jr. (born November 12, 1996) is an American politician who is a member of the Maryland House of Delegates for District 27B in Calvert and Prince George's counties in Maryland.

== Background ==
Long graduated from Huntingtown High School and later attended Liberty University, where he earned a Bachelors of Arts degree in clinical psychology. He is currently the pastor at Communion Church in Huntingtown, Maryland. Long previously served as a legislative aide to then-President of the Maryland Senate Thomas V. Miller Jr. and state senators Joanne C. Benson and Michael Jackson.

In 2020, Long was elected as a Democratic National Convention delegate, pledged to Joe Biden, with 19.5 percent of the vote.

In February 2021, Long applied to fill a vacancy in the Maryland House of Delegates left by the appointment of state delegate Michael Jackson to the Maryland Senate. The Prince George's County Democratic Committee nominated Jacqueline Steele-McCall to fill the vacancy, but the Calvert County Democratic Central Committee picked Rachel Jones to fill the vacancy. Jones was ultimately appointed to the seat by Governor Larry Hogan on February 17, 2021. Long challenged Jones' incumbency in the 2022 Maryland House of Delegates election, defeating her in the Democratic primary with 54.3 percent of the vote. He faced no opposition in the general election.

== In the legislature ==
Long was sworn into the Maryland House of Delegates on January 11, 2023. He and Joe Vogel are the first Gen-Z members of the Maryland General Assembly. He is a member of the House Environment and Transportation Committee.

In 2024, Long applied to run as a delegate to the Democratic National Convention pledged to Joe Biden, but was denied by the Maryland Democratic Party. He was later selected to be an at-large delegate to the DNC, where he supported Kamala Harris following Biden's withdrawal from the race.

In October 2025, after Governor Wes Moore named state senator Michael Jackson as the secretary of Maryland State Police, Long announced that he would seek appointment to the Maryland Senate to fill the remainder of Jackson's term.

== Political positions ==
Long has described himself as a "fiscal conservative". During his House of Delegates candidacy, Long campaigned on topics such as women's rights, making schools safer, fixing the state's transportation system, and making Maryland more retiree-friendly.

During the 2026 legislative session, Long introduced a bill to investigate conditions at the House of Reformation and Instruction for Colored Children in Cheltenham, citing the rediscovery of a grave site containing an estimated 230 youths buried in unmarked graves.

== Personal life ==
Long lives in Brandywine, Maryland.

== Legal issues ==
In 2020, Long was charged with driving under the influence and driving on a suspended license, along with several related offenses. He received probation before judgment on the impaired driving charge, while other charges were dropped.

In April 2023, Long was charged with home invasion and first-degree felony assault after allegedly breaking into his aunt's Huntingtown home and threatening her with a pipe. His attorneys denied the charges, arguing that Long was not in the area when it occurred and that the charges were the result of an undisclosed family matter. If convicted, Long faced a maximum of 25 years in prison for each charge. In May 2023, both charges were downgraded before trial to misdemeanors, second-degree assault and fourth-degree burglary. In August 2023, the St. Mary's County State's Attorney's Office dropped all charges against Long.

In January 2025, Primis Bank filed a lawsuit against the Communion Way of the Cross church and its leaders, including Long, alleging that its leaders had failed to make rent payments over a 26-month period. The parties reached a $50,000 settlement agreement intended to resolve the dispute, but after the first $10,000 payment was returned for insufficient funds, a higher judgment of $81,500 was finalized by a Charles County Circuit Court judge in January 2026. Long did not include the judgment on his state financial disclosure filing, though it is unclear whether a court judgment of this type must be reported alongside any financial obligations owed by elected officials. In an interview with The Baltimore Sun, Long said that his name appeared on the paperwork related to the rent payments because of "the old structure of the church" and disputed that the church had gone two years without paying rent. He also claimed, but later recanted, that the church owned the building.

== Electoral history ==
Male Delegate to the Democratic National Convention, 2020
Party	Candidate	Votes	%
Democratic	Edward I. Lewis (Biden)	101,527	19.6
Democratic	Jeffrie E. Long, Jr. (Biden)	100,715	19.5
Democratic	David M. Salazar (Biden)	98,329	19.0
Democratic	Len Lucchi (Biden)	94,796	18.3
Democratic	Edward Burroughs, III (Sanders)	15,767	3.0
Democratic	Markus J. Tarjamo (Sanders)	13,424	2.6
Democratic	Zach Conron (Sanders)	11,691	2.3
Democratic	Michael T. Dunphy (Sanders)	11,323	2.2
Democratic	Rushern Baker IV (Klobuchar)	9,577	1.9
Democratic	Arthur Ellis (Warren)	7,397	1.4
Democratic	Doron Jarrell Holmes (Yang)	5,447	1.1
Democratic	Dylan Behler (Warren)	5,303	1.0
Democratic	Chike Aguh (Buttigieg)	4,589	0.9
Democratic	Kent Roberson (Warren)	4,217	0.8
Democratic	Bryan D. Medema (Warren)	4,176	0.8
Democratic	Ivon E. Cummings (Gabbard)	3,646	0.7
Democratic	Shukoor Ahmed (Buttigieg)	3,613	0.7
Democratic	Ben Barnes (Buttigieg)	3,498	0.7
Democratic	Kevin L. Ward (Buttigieg)	3,240	0.6
Democratic	Rudy D. Anthony (Yang)	3,152	0.6
Democratic	John Rogard Tabori (Warren)	2,979	0.6
Democratic	Mark Cook (Bloomberg)	2,801	0.5
Democratic	Jason W. Woltz (Yang)	2,012	0.4
Democratic	Nicholas T. Fugate (Yang)	1,876	0.4
Democratic	Horacio Moronta, III (Gabbard)	1,299	0.3
Democratic	Bill Bystricky (Gabbard)	876	0.2

Maryland House of Delegates District 27B Democratic primary election, 2022
Party	Candidate	Votes	%
Democratic	Jeffrie E. Long, Jr.	3,158	54.3
Democratic	Rachel Jones	2,345	40.3
Democratic	June Jones	310	5.3

Maryland House of Delegates District 27B election, 2022
Party	Candidate	Votes	%
Democratic	Jeffrie Long Jr.	12,227	95.31
Write-in		602	4.69
