= Sue Kullen =

American politician

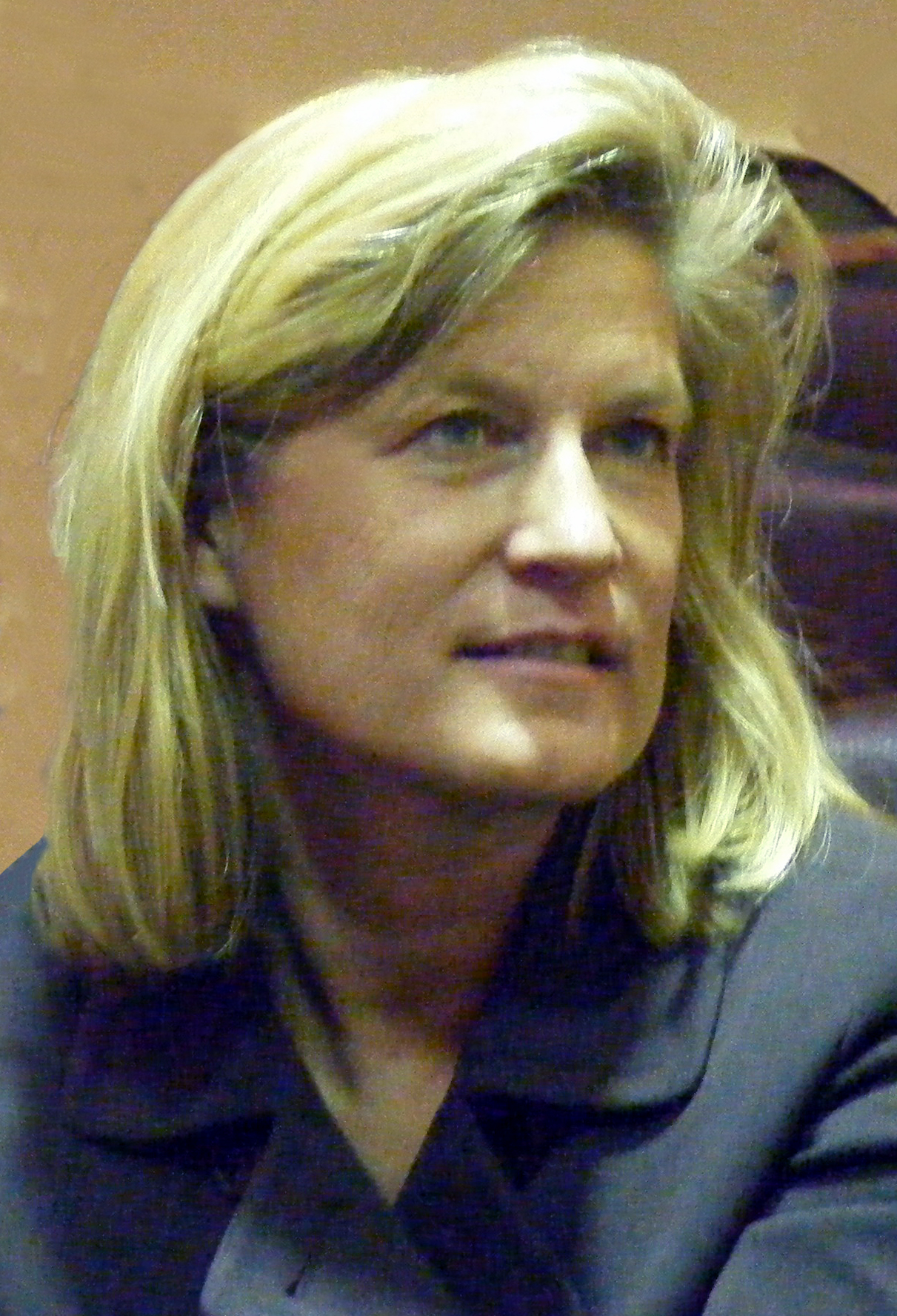

Maryland House of Delegates
- In office 2004–2011
- Constituency: District 27B, Calvert County

Personal details
- Born: May 18, 1960 (age 66) Verona, Italy
- Party: Democratic

Sue Kullen is an American politician from Maryland and a member of the Democratic Party. She served two terms in the Maryland House of Delegates, representing Maryland's District 27B in Calvert County. Kullen was originally appointed to the seat in 2004, and elected in 2006. She served on the Health and Government Operations Committee from 2004 to 2011 and as President of the Women Legislators of Maryland, a nonpartisan committee of state legislators, from 2009 to 2011. In 2014, Kullen ran unsuccessfully for a seat in the Maryland House of Delegates in District 27C, losing to incumbent Mark Fisher.

== Career ==
- Member of House of Delegates August 4, 2004 - January 12, 2011
- Chief Deputy Majority Whip, 2007–2011
- Member, Health and Government Operations Committee, 2004–2011
  - health occupations subcommittee, 2005
  - long-term care subcommittee, 2005
  - minority health disparities subcommittee, 2005–2011
  - pharmaceuticals subcommittee, 2005–06
  - insurance subcommittee, 2007–2011
- Joint Committee on Access to Mental Health Services, 2005–2011
- Joint Committee on Health Care Delivery and Financing, 2007–2011
- Member, Agricultural Stewardship Commission, 2005–06
- Vice-Chair, Southern Maryland Delegation, 2006–2011
- Chair, Calvert County Delegation, 2007–2011
- Member, Maryland Educators Caucus, 2005–2011
- Maryland Green Caucus, 2005–2011
- Maryland Labor Caucus, 2005–2011
- Maryland Rural Caucus, 2005–2011
- Maryland Legislative Sportsmen's Caucus, 2005–2011
- Maryland Veterans Caucus, 2005–2011
- President, Women Legislators of Maryland, 2009–2011
  - member, 2005–2011
  - executive board, 2006–2011
  - 2nd vice-president, 2007–08
- Member and Vice-Chair, Maryland Developmental Disabilities Council, 1993–2003
- Executive Board, Tri-County Council for Southern Maryland, 2004–2011
- Member, Steering Committee, Juvenile Drug Court, Calvert County, 2005
- Governor's Wellmobile Program Advisory Board, 2006–2011
- Working Waterfront Commission, 2007–2011

=== Legislative Notes ===
- Voted for the Maryland Gang Prosecution Act of 2007 (HB713), subjecting gang members to up to 20 years in prison and/or a fine of up to $100,000
- Voted for Jessica’s Law (HB 930), eliminating parole for the most violent child sexual predators and creating a mandatory minimum sentence of 25 years in state prison, 2007
- Voted for Public Safety – Statewide DNA Database System – Crimes of Violence and Burglary – Post conviction (HB 370), helping to give police officers and prosecutors greater resources to solve crimes and eliminating a backlog of 24,000 unanalyzed DNA samples, leading to 192 arrests, 2008
- Voted for Vehicle Laws – Repeated Drunk and Drugged Driving Offenses – Suspension of License (HB 293), strengthening Maryland’s drunk driving laws by imposing a mandatory one year license suspension for a person convicted of drunk driving more than once in five years, 2009
- Voted for HB 102, creating the House Emergency Medical Services System Workgroup, leading to Maryland’s budgeting of $52 million to fund three new Medevac helicopters to replace the State’s aging fleet, 2009

Delegate Kullen has annually voted to support classroom teachers, public schools, police and hospitals in Calvert County. Since 2002, funding to schools across the State has increased 82%, resulting in Maryland being ranked top in the nation for K-12 education.
