= 2010 Maryland House of Delegates election =

- November 2, 2010

All 141 seats in the Maryland House of Delegates 71 seats needed for a majority
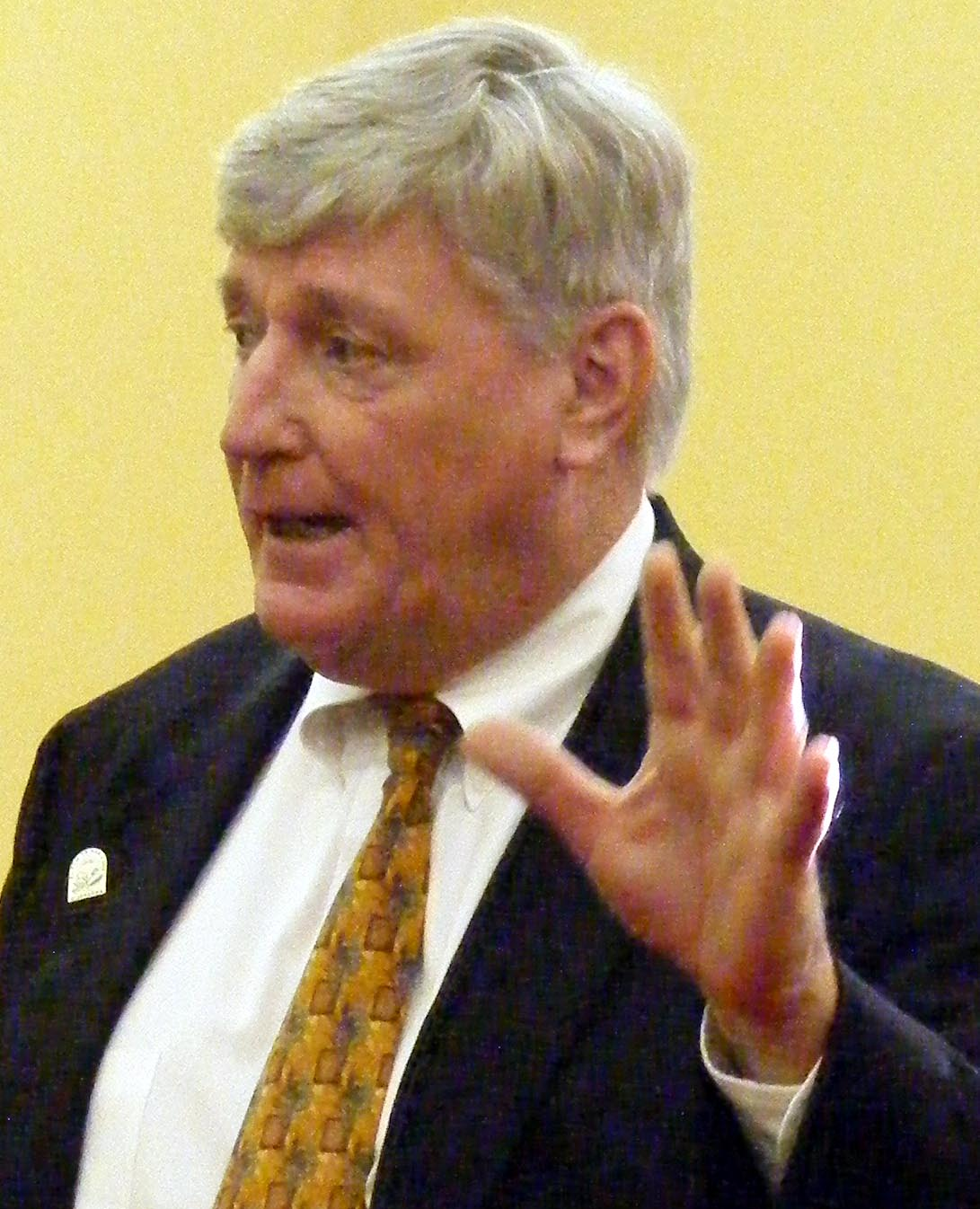

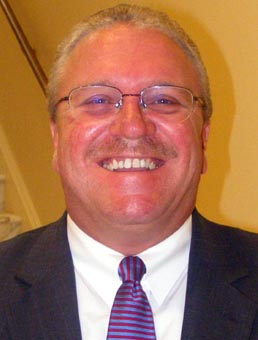
	Majority party	Minority party
Leader	Michael E. Busch	Tony O'Donnell
Party	Democratic	Republican
Leader since	January 8, 2003	2007
Leader's seat	30th district	District 29C
Last election	104	37
Seats won	98	43
Seat change	▼6	▲6
- Results: Republican gain Democratic hold Republican hold
Speaker before election
Michael E. Busch
Democratic
Elected Speaker
Michael E. Busch
Democratic

The 2010 Maryland House of Delegates election was held on November 2, 2010, electing all 141 members of the chamber. This coincided with the election of all 47 of Maryland's state senators, along with other statewide offices.

== Retiring incumbents ==
=== Democrats ===
1. District 3A: Sue Hecht retired.
2. District 8: Todd Schuler retired to run for the Baltimore County Council in District 6.
3. District 14: Herman L. Taylor Jr. retired to run for Congress in Maryland's 4th congressional district.
4. District 14: Karen S. Montgomery retired to run for state senator in District 14.
5. District 15: Craig L. Rice retired to run for the Montgomery County Council in District 2.
6. District 16: Karen Britto retired.
7. District 19: Henry B. Heller retired.
8. District 19: Roger Manno retired to run for state senator in District 19.
9. District 23A: Gerron Levi retired to run for Prince George's County Executive.
10. District 24: Joanne C. Benson retired to run for state senator in District 24.
11. District 28: Murray D. Levy retired.
12. District 38B: James N. Mathias Jr. retired to run for state senator in District 38.
13. District 39: Saqib Ali retired to run for state senator in District 39.
14. District 43: Scherod C. Barnes retired to run for the Baltimore City Council in District 4.
15. District 46: Carolyn J. Krysiak retired.
16. District 47: Victor R. Ramirez retired to run for state senator in District 47.

=== Republicans ===
1. District 2B: Christopher B. Shank retired to run for state senator in District 2.
2. District 4A: Joseph R. Bartlett retired.
3. District 5A: Tanya Thornton Shewell retired.
4. District 7: J. B. Jennings retired to run for state senator in District 7.
5. District 33A: James King retired to run for state senator in District 33.
6. District 36: Mary Roe Walkup retired.
7. District 38A: Carolyn J. Elmore retired.

== Incumbents defeated ==
=== In primaries ===
==== Democrats ====
1. District 34A: B. Daniel Riley lost renomination to Mary-Dulany James and Marla Posey-Moss.
2. District 44: Ruth M. Kirk lost renomination to Keiffer Mitchell Jr., Keith E. Haynes, and Melvin L. Stukes.

==== Republicans ====
1. District 3B: Charles A. Jenkins lost renomination to Michael Hough.
2. District 4A: Paul S. Stull lost renomination to Kelly Schulz and Kathy Afzali.
3. District 36: Richard A. Sossi lost renomination to Steve Hershey

=== In the general election ===
==== Democrats ====
1. District 27B: Sue Kullen lost to Mark N. Fisher.
2. District 30: Virginia P. Clagett lost to Herbert H. McMillan.

== Predictions ==
Source	Ranking	As of
Governing	Safe D	November 1, 2010

== List of districts ==
=== District 1A ===
Maryland House of Delegates District 1A election, 2010
Party	Candidate	Votes	%
Republican	Wendell R. Beitzel (incumbent)	8,866	72.6
Democratic	James R. "Smokey" Stanton	3,333	27.3
Write-in		17	0.1
Republican hold			

=== District 1B ===
==== Democratic primary ====
Maryland House of Delegates District 1B Democratic primary election, 2010
Party	Candidate	Votes	%
Democratic	Kevin Kelly (incumbent)	1,924	69.2
Democratic	Kevin M. Shaffer	856	30.8

==== General election ====
Maryland House of Delegates District 1B election, 2010
Party	Candidate	Votes	%
Democratic	Kevin Kelly (incumbent)	6,226	51.3
Republican	Mary Beth Pirolozzi	5,908	48.6
Write-in		12	0.1
Democratic hold			

=== District 1C ===
Maryland House of Delegates District 1C election, 2010
Party	Candidate	Votes	%
Republican	LeRoy E. Myers Jr. (incumbent)	7,554	69.7
Democratic	Ronald Lohr	3,267	30.1
Write-in		22	0.2
Republican hold			

=== District 2A ===
==== Republican primary ====
Maryland House of Delegates District 2A Republican primary election, 2010
Party	Candidate	Votes	%
Republican	Andrew A. Serafini (incumbent)	2,672	53.1
Republican	Denny Stouffer	1,231	24.5
Republican	William Joseph Wivell	1,126	22.4

==== General election ====
Maryland House of Delegates District 2A election, 2010
Party	Candidate	Votes	%
Republican	Andrew A. Serafini (incumbent)	9,754	71.0
Democratic	Neil Becker	3,957	28.8
Write-in		27	0.2
Republican hold			

=== District 2B ===
==== Republican primary ====
Maryland House of Delegates District 2B Republican primary election, 2010
Party	Candidate	Votes	%
Republican	Neil Parrott	3,199	81.1
Republican	Ted Brennan	744	18.9

==== General election ====
Maryland House of Delegates District 2B election, 2010
Party	Candidate	Votes	%
Republican	Neil Parrott	7,663	61.8
Democratic	Brien Poffenberger	4,718	38.0
Write-in		22	0.2
Republican hold			

=== District 2C ===
Maryland House of Delegates District 2C election, 2010
Party	Candidate	Votes	%
Democratic	John P. Donoghue (incumbent)	4,426	52.7
Republican	Cort Frederick Meinelschmidt	3,936	46.9
Write-in		30	0.4
Democratic hold			

=== District 3A ===
==== Republican primary ====
Maryland House of Delegates District 3A Republican primary election, 2010
Party	Candidate	Votes	%
Republican	Patrick N. Hogan	3,040	33.3
Republican	Scott Rolle	2,260	24.8
Republican	Chris Huckenpoehler	2,251	24.7
Republican	Chuck Knapp	1,570	17.2

==== General election ====
Maryland House of Delegates District 3A election, 2010
Party	Candidate	Votes	%
Democratic	Galen R. Clagett (incumbent)	13,341	27.5
Republican	Patrick N. Hogan	12,617	26.0
Republican	Scott Rolle	11,312	23.3
Democratic	Candy O. Greenway	11,203	23.1
Write-in		61	0.1
Democratic hold			
Republican gain from Democratic			

=== District 3B ===
==== Republican primary ====
Maryland House of Delegates District 3B Republican primary election, 2010
Party	Candidate	Votes	%
Republican	Michael Hough	3,017	68.3
Republican	Charles A. Jenkins (incumbent)	1,399	31.7

==== General election ====
Maryland House of Delegates District 3B election, 2010
Party	Candidate	Votes	%
Republican	Michael Hough	10,090	57.4
Democratic	Paul Gilligan	7,444	42.4
Write-in		43	0.2
Republican hold			

=== District 4A ===
==== Republican primary ====
Maryland House of Delegates District 4A Republican primary election, 2010
Party	Candidate	Votes	%
Republican	Kathy Afzali	3,454	22.5
Republican	Kelly Schulz	3,399	22.1
Republican	Paul S. Stull (incumbent)	3,393	22.1
Republican	Dino E. Flores, Jr.	2,759	18.0
Republican	John L. "Lennie" Thompson, Jr.	2,354	15.3

==== General election ====
Maryland House of Delegates District 4A election, 2010
Party	Candidate	Votes	%
Republican	Kelly Schulz	16,952	32.2
Republican	Kathy Afzali	16,683	31.7
Democratic	Ryan P. Trout	9,678	18.4
Democratic	Bonita Riffle Currey	6,993	13.3
Independent	Scott L. Guenthner	2,150	4.1
Write-in		162	0.3
Republican hold			
Republican hold			

=== District 4B ===
==== Republican primary ====
Maryland House of Delegates District 4B Republican primary election, 2010
Party	Candidate	Votes	%
Republican	Donald B. Elliott (incumbent)	2,367	55.8
Republican	Bob Lubitz	1,106	26.1
Republican	Bret Grossnickle	767	18.1

==== General election ====
Maryland House of Delegates District 4B election, 2010
Party	Candidate	Votes	%
Republican	Donald B. Elliott (incumbent)	11,409	74.9
Democratic	Timothy Schlauch	3,814	25.0
Write-in		14	0.1
Republican hold			

=== District 5A ===
==== Republican primary ====
Maryland House of Delegates District 5A Republican primary election, 2010
Party	Candidate	Votes	%
Republican	Justin Ready	6,266	39.3
Republican	Nancy R. Stocksdale (incumbent)	4,196	26.3
Republican	William C. Niner	4,173	26.2
Republican	Dave Wallace	1,316	8.3

==== General election ====
Maryland House of Delegates District 5A election, 2010
Party	Candidate	Votes	%
Republican	Justin Ready	21,226	38.4
Republican	Nancy R. Stocksdale (incumbent)	19,046	34.4
Democratic	Francis X. Walsh	7,688	13.9
Democratic	Sharon L. Baker	7,250	13.1
Write-in		110	0.2
Republican hold			
Republican hold			

=== District 5B ===
==== Republican primary ====
Maryland House of Delegates District 5B Republican primary election, 2010
Party	Candidate	Votes	%
Republican	Wade Kach (incumbent)	2,606	57.5
Republican	Tom Morgan	1,316	29.0
Republican	Chris Luciano	612	13.5

==== General election ====
Maryland House of Delegates District 5B election, 2010
Party	Candidate	Votes	%
Republican	Wade Kach (incumbent)	13,933	70.8
Democratic	Pete Definbaugh	4,881	24.8
Libertarian	M. Justin Kinsey	863	4.4
Write-in		12	0.1
Republican hold			

=== District 6 ===
==== Democratic primary ====
Maryland House of Delegates District 6 Democratic primary election, 2010
Party	Candidate	Votes	%
Democratic	Johnny Olszewski (incumbent)	6,301	23.3
Democratic	Michael H. Weir Jr. (incumbent)	5,016	18.6
Democratic	Joseph J. Minnick (incumbent)	4,856	18.0
Democratic	Todd Crandell	3,584	13.3
Democratic	Jake Mohorovic	2,616	9.7
Democratic	Don Mason	1,802	6.7
Democratic	Cassandra Brown Umoh	1,715	6.4
Democratic	Raymond J. Smith	1,111	4.1

==== General election ====
Maryland House of Delegates District 6 election, 2010
Party	Candidate	Votes	%
Democratic	Johnny Olszewski (incumbent)	16,278	20.2
Democratic	Michael H. Weir Jr. (incumbent)	14,618	18.2
Democratic	Joseph J. Minnick (incumbent)	14,405	17.9
Republican	Robert B. Long	12,999	16.2
Republican	Ric Metzgar	12,480	15.5
Republican	Carlton William Clendaniel	9,612	11.9
Write-in		79	0.1
Democratic hold			
Democratic hold			
Democratic hold			

=== District 7 ===
==== Republican primary ====
Maryland House of Delegates District 7 Republican primary election, 2010
Party	Candidate	Votes	%
Republican	Pat McDonough (incumbent)	6,479	27.2
Republican	Rick Impallaria (incumbent)	5,678	23.8
Republican	Kathy Szeliga	4,021	16.9
Republican	Brian Bennett	1,838	7.7
Republican	Marilyn Booker	1,808	7.6
Republican	Roger Zajdel	1,783	7.5
Republican	John Cromwell	1,031	4.3
Republican	Jim Berndt	873	3.7
Republican	Laine O. C. Clark	312	1.3

==== Democratic primary ====
Maryland House of Delegates District 7 Democratic primary election, 2010
Party	Candidate	Votes	%
Democratic	Kristina A. Sargent	5,108	28.9
Democratic	Jeff Beard	4,937	27.9
Democratic	James Ward Morrow	4,200	23.8
Democratic	David "SKI" Mioduszewski	3,432	19.4

==== General election ====
Maryland House of Delegates District 7 election, 2010
Party	Candidate	Votes	%
Republican	Pat McDonough (incumbent)	27,217	23.1
Republican	Rick Impallaria (incumbent)	25,450	21.6
Republican	Kathy Szeliga	24,573	20.9
Democratic	Jeff Beard	14,885	12.6
Democratic	Kristina A. Sargent	13,551	11.5
Democratic	James Ward Morrow	11,960	10.2
Write-in		111	0.1
Republican hold			
Republican hold			
Republican hold			

=== District 8 ===
==== Republican primary ====
Maryland House of Delegates District 8 Republican primary election, 2010
Party	Candidate	Votes	%
Republican	Joseph C. Boteler III (incumbent)	5,033	33.4
Republican	John W. E. Cluster Jr.	4,453	29.6
Republican	Norma M. Secoura	2,870	19.1
Republican	Rani Merryman	2,694	17.9

==== General election ====
Maryland House of Delegates District 8 election, 2010
Party	Candidate	Votes	%
Republican	Joseph C. Boteler III (incumbent)	21,688	19.4
Republican	John W. E. Cluster Jr.	19,462	17.4
Democratic	Eric Bromwell (incumbent)	19,379	17.3
Democratic	Ruth Baisden	18,640	16.7
Republican	Norma M. Secoura	16,458	14.7
Democratic	Cal Bowman	16,101	14.4
Write-in		84	0.1
Democratic hold			
Republican hold			
Republican gain from Democratic			

=== District 9A ===
Maryland House of Delegates District 9A election, 2010
Party	Candidate	Votes	%
Republican	Gail H. Bates (incumbent)	21,709	30.6
Republican	Warren E. Miller (incumbent)	19,911	28.0
Democratic	Maryann Maher	15,264	21.5
Democratic	Jonathan Weinstein	14,110	19.9
Write-in		40	0.1
Republican hold			
Republican hold			

=== District 9B ===
==== Republican primary ====
Maryland House of Delegates District 9B Republican primary election, 2010
Party	Candidate	Votes	%
Republican	Susan W. Krebs (incumbent)	2,704	50.7
Republican	Larry Helminiak	2,632	49.3

==== General election ====
Maryland House of Delegates District 9B election, 2010
Party	Candidate	Votes	%
Republican	Susan W. Krebs (incumbent)	12,488	73.5
Democratic	Anita Lombardi Riley	4,442	26.2
Write-in		53	0.3
Republican hold			

=== District 10 ===
==== Democratic primary ====
Maryland House of Delegates District 10 Democratic primary election, 2010
Party	Candidate	Votes	%
Democratic	Shirley Nathan-Pulliam (incumbent)	12,061	30.9
Democratic	Emmett C. Burns Jr. (incumbent)	11,914	30.6
Democratic	Adrienne A. Jones (incumbent)	10,866	27.9
Democratic	Barry Chapman	2,643	6.8
Democratic	Frederick Ware-Newsome	1,488	3.8

==== General election ====
Maryland House of Delegates District 10 election, 2010
Party	Candidate	Votes	%
Democratic	Emmett C. Burns Jr. (incumbent)	31,513	31.6
Democratic	Shirley Nathan-Pulliam (incumbent)	31,399	31.5
Democratic	Adrienne A. Jones (incumbent)	29,719	29.8
Republican	Jeanne L. Turnock	6,837	6.9
Write-in		332	0.3
Democratic hold			
Democratic hold			
Democratic hold			

=== District 11 ===
==== Democratic primary ====
Maryland House of Delegates District 11 Democratic primary election, 2010
Party	Candidate	Votes	%
Democratic	Jon S. Cardin (incumbent)	13,539	34.0
Democratic	Dana Stein (incumbent)	11,855	29.7
Democratic	Dan K. Morhaim (incumbent)	11,422	28.7
Democratic	Regg Hatcher	3,037	7.6

==== Republican primary ====
Maryland House of Delegates District 11 Republican primary election, 2010
Party	Candidate	Votes	%
Republican	Steven J. Smith	1,783	21.2
Republican	J. Michael Collins	1,767	21.0
Republican	Carol C. Byrd	1,685	20.1
Republican	William D. Badore	1,186	14.1
Republican	Alberto Joseph Halphen	1,109	13.2
Republican	Gregory Prush	868	10.3

==== General election ====
Maryland House of Delegates District 11 election, 2010
Party	Candidate	Votes	%
Democratic	Jon S. Cardin (incumbent)	32,211	24.3
Democratic	Dan K. Morhaim (incumbent)	28,129	21.2
Democratic	Dana Stein (incumbent)	28,034	21.2
Republican	J. Michael Collins	13,971	10.6
Republican	Carol C. Byrd	13,952	10.5
Republican	Steven J. Smith	13,647	10.3
Libertarian	Brandon Brooks	2,341	1.8
Write-in		115	0.1
Democratic hold			
Democratic hold			
Democratic hold			

=== District 12A ===
==== Republican primary ====
Maryland House of Delegates District 12A Republican primary election, 2010
Party	Candidate	Votes	%
Republican	Joseph D."Joe" Hooe	2,412	32.9
Republican	Albert L. Nalley	2,185	29.8
Republican	David "Augie" Aughenbaugh	1,772	24.2
Republican	Brian A. Matulonis	952	13.0

==== General election ====
Maryland House of Delegates District 12A election, 2010
Party	Candidate	Votes	%
Democratic	James E. Malone Jr. (incumbent)	14,109	28.3
Democratic	Steven J. DeBoy Sr. (incumbent)	13,011	26.1
Republican	Joseph D."Joe" Hooe	12,327	24.7
Republican	Albert L. Nalley	10,453	20.9
Write-in		32	0.1
Democratic hold			
Democratic hold			

=== District 12B ===
==== Democratic primary ====
Maryland House of Delegates District 12B Democratic primary election, 2010
Party	Candidate	Votes	%
Democratic	Elizabeth Bobo (incumbent)	3,909	81.9
Democratic	John Bailey	862	18.1

==== General election ====
Maryland House of Delegates District 12B election, 2010
Party	Candidate	Votes	%
Democratic	Elizabeth Bobo (incumbent)	11,164	71.6
Republican	Robert W. Wheatley	4,421	28.4
Write-in		8	0.1
Democratic hold			

=== District 13 ===
==== Republican primary ====
Maryland House of Delegates District 13 Republican primary election, 2010
Party	Candidate	Votes	%
Republican	Ed Priola	3,638	32.5
Republican	Jeff Robinson	2,871	25.6
Republican	Loretta Gaffney	2,586	23.1
Republican	J'Neanne Theus	2,109	18.8

==== General election ====
Maryland House of Delegates District 13 election, 2010
Party	Candidate	Votes	%
Democratic	Guy Guzzone (incumbent)	27,140	21.9
Democratic	Shane Pendergrass (incumbent)	25,894	20.9
Democratic	Frank S. Turner (incumbent)	24,823	20.1
Republican	Ed Priola	16,225	13.1
Republican	Loretta Gaffney	14,844	12.0
Republican	Jeff Robinson	14,680	11.9
Write-in		91	0.1
Democratic hold			
Democratic hold			
Democratic hold			

=== District 14 ===
==== Democratic primary ====
Maryland House of Delegates District 14 Democratic primary election, 2010
Party	Candidate	Votes	%
Democratic	Anne Kaiser (incumbent)	6,380	24.1
Democratic	Craig Zucker	6,216	23.5
Democratic	Eric Luedtke	3,696	14.0
Democratic	Jodi Finkelstein	3,154	11.9
Democratic	Robert Bo Newsome	2,834	10.7
Democratic	Gerald Roper	1,660	6.3
Democratic	Neeta Datt	1,288	4.9
Democratic	Vanessa Ali	1,244	4.7

==== General election ====
Maryland House of Delegates District 14 election, 2010
Party	Candidate	Votes	%
Democratic	Anne Kaiser (incumbent)	23,503	21.5
Democratic	Craig Zucker	22,148	20.2
Democratic	Eric Luedtke	21,165	19.3
Republican	Patricia A. Fenati	14,866	13.6
Republican	Henry Kahwaty	14,152	12.9
Republican	Maria Peña-Faustino	13,639	12.4
Write-in		79	0.1
Democratic hold			
Democratic hold			
Democratic hold			

=== District 15 ===
==== Democratic primary ====
Maryland House of Delegates District 15 Democratic primary election, 2010
Party	Candidate	Votes	%
Democratic	Brian J. Feldman (incumbent)	6,262	31.4
Democratic	Kathleen Dumais (incumbent)	6,086	30.6
Democratic	Aruna Miller	4,671	23.5
Democratic	David Fraser-Hidalgo	1,755	8.8
Democratic	Lara Wibeto	1,142	5.7

==== General election ====
Maryland House of Delegates District 15 election, 2010
Party	Candidate	Votes	%
Democratic	Kathleen Dumais (incumbent)	23,476	20.7
Democratic	Brian J. Feldman (incumbent)	23,120	20.4
Democratic	Aruna Miller	21,353	18.9
Republican	Scott Graham	15,298	13.5
Republican	Sylvia J. Darrow	14,490	12.8
Republican	Matthew Mockerman	13,477	11.9
Libertarian	Arvin Vohra	1,910	1.7
Write-in		54	0.0
Democratic hold			
Democratic hold			
Democratic hold			

=== District 16 ===
==== Democratic primary ====
Maryland House of Delegates District 16 Democratic primary election, 2010
Party	Candidate	Votes	%
Democratic	Susan C. Lee (incumbent)	9,239	23.1
Democratic	William Frick (incumbent)	9,227	23.1
Democratic	Ariana Kelly	5,129	12.8
Democratic	Kyle Lierman	4,773	11.9
Democratic	Hrant Jamgochian	3,254	8.1
Democratic	Mark Winston	2,142	5.4
Democratic	Bill Farley	1,732	4.3
Democratic	Charlie Chester	1,392	3.5
Democratic	Scott Goldberg	1,230	3.1
Democratic	Michael David Sriqui	657	1.6
Democratic	Peter Dennis	419	1.0
Democratic	Craig G. Herskowitz	390	1.0
Democratic	John Adams	374	0.9

==== General election ====
Maryland House of Delegates District 16 election, 2010
Party	Candidate	Votes	%
Democratic	William Frick (incumbent)	29,813	24.3
Democratic	Susan C. Lee (incumbent)	28,768	23.4
Democratic	Ariana Kelly	28,341	23.1
Republican	Jeanne Allen	13,553	11.0
Republican	Carol G. Bowis	11,619	9.5
Republican	Meyer F. Marks	10,678	8.7
Write-in		157	0.1
Democratic hold			
Democratic hold			
Democratic hold			

=== District 17 ===
Maryland House of Delegates District 17 election, 2010
Party	Candidate	Votes	%
Democratic	Kumar P. Barve (incumbent)	20,720	22.9
Democratic	James W. Gilchrist (incumbent)	20,704	22.9
Democratic	Luiz R. S. Simmons (incumbent)	20,469	22.7
Republican	Daniel R. Campos	10,646	11.8
Republican	Craig Frick	8,945	9.9
Republican	Josephine J. Wang	8,736	9.7
Write-in		91	0.1
Democratic hold			
Democratic hold			
Democratic hold			

=== District 18 ===
==== Democratic primary ====
Maryland House of Delegates District 18 Democratic primary election, 2010
Party	Candidate	Votes	%
Democratic	Ana Sol Gutierrez (incumbent)	7,879	24.1
Democratic	Jeff Waldstreicher (incumbent)	7,386	22.6
Democratic	Al Carr (incumbent)	6,756	20.7
Democratic	Dana Beyer	5,450	16.7
Democratic	Vanessa Atterbeary	4,247	13.0
Democratic	Michael K. Heney	932	2.9

==== General election ====
Maryland House of Delegates District 18 election, 2010
Party	Candidate	Votes	%
Democratic	Al Carr (incumbent)	26,313	34.0
Democratic	Ana Sol Gutierrez (incumbent)	25,545	33.0
Democratic	Jeff Waldstreicher (incumbent)	24,822	32.0
Write-in		807	1.0
Democratic hold			
Democratic hold			
Democratic hold			

=== District 19 ===
==== Democratic primary ====
Maryland House of Delegates District 19 Democratic primary election, 2010
Party	Candidate	Votes	%
Democratic	Benjamin F. Kramer (incumbent)	7,603	26.3
Democratic	Bonnie Cullison	6,083	21.1
Democratic	Sam Arora	5,767	20.0
Democratic	Jay Hutchins	4,559	15.8
Democratic	Hoan Dang	3,277	11.3
Democratic	Vivian Scretchen	1,600	5.5

==== General election ====
Maryland House of Delegates District 19 election, 2010
Party	Candidate	Votes	%
Democratic	Benjamin F. Kramer (incumbent)	23,526	25.8
Democratic	Sam Arora	22,242	24.4
Democratic	Bonnie Cullison	21,795	23.9
Republican	Linn Rivera	11,929	13.1
Republican	Tom Masser	11,362	12.5
Write-in		288	0.3
Democratic hold			
Democratic hold			
Democratic hold			

=== District 20 ===
==== Democratic primary ====
Maryland House of Delegates District 20 Democratic primary election, 2010
Party	Candidate	Votes	%
Democratic	Sheila E. Hixson (incumbent)	7,532	29.7
Democratic	Heather Mizeur (incumbent)	7,504	29.6
Democratic	Tom Hucker (incumbent)	7,153	28.2
Democratic	Chris Stoughton	1,470	5.8
Democratic	Robert Jonathan Estrada	1,000	3.9
Democratic	Elihu Eli El	675	2.7

==== General election ====
Maryland House of Delegates District 20 election, 2010
Party	Candidate	Votes	%
Democratic	Sheila E. Hixson (incumbent)	23,782	34.4
Democratic	Heather Mizeur (incumbent)	22,532	32.6
Democratic	Tom Hucker (incumbent)	22,434	32.4
Write-in		472	0.7
Democratic hold			
Democratic hold			
Democratic hold			

=== District 21 ===
==== Democratic primary ====
Maryland House of Delegates District 21 Democratic primary election, 2010
Party	Candidate	Votes	%
Democratic	Joseline Peña-Melnyk (incumbent)	6,608	29.2
Democratic	Ben Barnes (incumbent)	6,225	27.5
Democratic	Barbara A. Frush (incumbent)	5,786	25.5
Democratic	Brian K. McDaniel	2,682	11.8
Democratic	Devin F. Tucker	1,358	6.0

==== General election ====
Maryland House of Delegates District 21 election, 2010
Party	Candidate	Votes	%
Democratic	Ben Barnes (incumbent)	18,954	25.2
Democratic	Barbara A. Frush (incumbent)	18,689	24.8
Democratic	Joseline Peña-Melnyk (incumbent)	18,457	24.5
Republican	Scott W. Dibiasio	6,131	8.1
Republican	Jason W. Papanikolas	6,013	8.0
Republican	Kat Nelson	5,822	7.7
Libertarian	K. Bryan Walker	1,151	1.5
Write-in		72	0.1
Democratic hold			
Democratic hold			
Democratic hold			

=== District 22 ===
Maryland House of Delegates District 22 election, 2010
Party	Candidate	Votes	%
Democratic	Tawanna P. Gaines (incumbent)	18,550	34.7
Democratic	Justin Ross (incumbent)	17,399	32.5
Democratic	Anne Healey (incumbent)	17,302	32.4
Write-in		207	0.4
Democratic hold			
Democratic hold			
Democratic hold			

=== District 23A ===
==== Democratic primary ====
Maryland House of Delegates District 23A Democratic primary election, 2010
Party	Candidate	Votes	%
Democratic	Geraldine Valentino-Smith	5,622	32.6
Democratic	James W. Hubbard (incumbent)	4,621	26.8
Democratic	Shukoor Ahmed	3,089	17.9
Democratic	Lisa Ransom	1,658	9.6
Democratic	Nicole A. Williams	1,389	8.1
Democratic	Paulette Faulkner	437	2.5
Democratic	Terence D. Collins	410	2.4

==== General election ====
Maryland House of Delegates District 23A election, 2010
Party	Candidate	Votes	%
Democratic	Geraldine Valentino-Smith	19,238	43.5
Democratic	James W. Hubbard (incumbent)	18,999	43.0
Republican	Margaret I. Moodie	5,913	13.4
Write-in		81	0.2
Democratic hold			
Democratic hold			

=== District 23B ===
==== Democratic primary ====
Maryland House of Delegates District 23B Democratic primary election, 2010
Party	Candidate	Votes	%
Democratic	Marvin E. Holmes Jr. (incumbent)	5,188	76.6
Democratic	Robin Breedon	1,583	23.4

==== General election ====
Maryland House of Delegates District 23B election, 2010
Party	Candidate	Votes	%
Democratic	Marvin E. Holmes Jr. (incumbent)	15,376	99.6
Write-in		65	0.4
Democratic hold			

=== District 24 ===
==== Democratic primary ====
Maryland House of Delegates District 24 Democratic primary election, 2010
Party	Candidate	Votes	%
Democratic	Carolyn J. B. Howard (incumbent)	6,962	24.9
Democratic	Michael L. Vaughn (incumbent)	5,750	20.5
Democratic	Tiffany T. Alston	3,434	12.3
Democratic	Greg Hall	3,124	11.2
Democratic	Kenneth Williams	1,707	6.1
Democratic	Byron Richardson	1,673	6.0
Democratic	Clayton Anthony Aarons	1,594	5.7
Democratic	Michael Oputa	1,530	5.5
Democratic	Nancy L. Dixon-Saxon	1,393	5.0
Democratic	Sherry James-Strother	839	3.0

==== General election ====
Maryland House of Delegates District 24 election, 2010
Party	Candidate	Votes	%
Democratic	Tiffany T. Alston	22,970	34.3
Democratic	Carolyn J. B. Howard (incumbent)	22,083	33.0
Democratic	Michael L. Vaughn (incumbent)	21,832	32.6
Write-in		103	0.2
Democratic hold			
Democratic hold			
Democratic hold			

=== District 25 ===
==== Democratic primary ====
Maryland House of Delegates District 25 Democratic primary election, 2010
Party	Candidate	Votes	%
Democratic	Aisha Braveboy (incumbent)	9,432	27.4
Democratic	Dereck E. Davis (incumbent)	8,659	25.1
Democratic	Melony G. Griffith (incumbent)	8,020	23.3
Democratic	Michelle R. Wright	3,848	11.2
Democratic	Erek Barron	2,522	7.3
Democratic	Antonio Faunteroy	1,472	4.3
Democratic	Davion E. Percy	506	1.5

==== General election ====
Maryland House of Delegates District 25 election, 2010
Party	Candidate	Votes	%
Democratic	Aisha Braveboy (incumbent)	27,804	35.3
Democratic	Dereck E. Davis (incumbent)	25,723	32.6
Democratic	Melony G. Griffith (incumbent)	25,095	31.8
Write-in		173	0.2
Democratic hold			
Democratic hold			
Democratic hold			

=== District 26 ===
==== Democratic primary ====
Maryland House of Delegates District 26 Democratic primary election, 2010
Party	Candidate	Votes	%
Democratic	Veronica L. Turner (incumbent)	9,133	25.3
Democratic	Jay Walker (incumbent)	8,181	22.7
Democratic	Kris Valderrama (incumbent)	6,889	19.1
Democratic	Ollie Anderson	5,302	14.7
Democratic	Sidney L. Gibson	3,703	10.3
Democratic	Hopal "Hope" Felton	1,540	4.3
Democratic	Branndon D. Jackson	1,318	3.7

==== General election ====
Maryland House of Delegates District 26 election, 2010
Party	Candidate	Votes	%
Democratic	Veronica L. Turner (incumbent)	27,770	35.0
Democratic	Jay Walker (incumbent)	24,328	30.7
Democratic	Kris Valderrama (incumbent)	24,141	30.5
Republican	Holly Ellison Henderson	2,916	3.7
Write-in		107	0.1
Democratic hold			
Democratic hold			
Democratic hold			

=== District 27A ===
==== Democratic primary ====
Maryland House of Delegates District 27A Democratic primary election, 2010
Party	Candidate	Votes	%
Democratic	James E. Proctor Jr. (incumbent)	8,336	37.5
Democratic	Joseph F. Vallario Jr. (incumbent)	7,420	33.4
Democratic	Percel Alston	1,665	7.5
Democratic	Sheri L. Beach	1,230	5.5
Democratic	James Woods	1,204	5.4
Democratic	Joe Harris	610	2.7
Democratic	Theron Green	564	2.5
Democratic	Barry A. Adams	484	2.2
Democratic	Russell P. Butler	463	2.1
Democratic	Jeffrey L. Brockington	240	1.1

==== General election ====
Maryland House of Delegates District 27A election, 2010
Party	Candidate	Votes	%
Democratic	James E. Proctor Jr. (incumbent)	25,487	43.4
Democratic	Joseph F. Vallario Jr. (incumbent)	22,627	38.5
Republican	Mike Hethmon	5,442	9.3
Republican	Antoinette "Toni" Jarboe-Duley	5,123	8.7
Write-in		53	0.1
Democratic hold			
Democratic hold			

=== District 27B ===
==== Republican primary ====
Maryland House of Delegates District 27B Republican primary election, 2010
Party	Candidate	Votes	%
Republican	Mark N. Fisher	1,816	64.8
Republican	Bob Schaefer	756	27.0
Republican	Mike Blasey	230	8.2

==== General election ====
Maryland House of Delegates District 27B election, 2010
Party	Candidate	Votes	%
Republican	Mark N. Fisher	8,141	52.6
Democratic	Sue Kullen (incumbent)	7,336	47.4
Write-in		6	0.0
Republican gain from Democratic			

=== District 28 ===
==== Democratic primary ====
Maryland House of Delegates District 28 Democratic primary election, 2010
Party	Candidate	Votes	%
Democratic	Sally Y. Jameson (incumbent)	7,507	25.4
Democratic	Peter Murphy (incumbent)	6,444	21.8
Democratic	C. T. Wilson	5,666	19.1
Democratic	Gary V. Hodge	3,335	11.3
Democratic	Jim Easter	3,155	10.7
Democratic	Bud Humbert	2,475	8.4
Democratic	Craig James Hickerson	1,016	3.4

==== General election ====
Maryland House of Delegates District 28 election, 2010
Party	Candidate	Votes	%
Democratic	Sally Y. Jameson (incumbent)	28,092	23.6
Democratic	Peter Murphy (incumbent)	26,006	21.9
Democratic	C. T. Wilson	23,619	19.9
Republican	Kirk W. Bowie	14,577	12.3
Republican	Mike Phillips	13,750	11.6
Republican	Daniel D. Richards	12,844	10.8
Write-in		69	0.1
Democratic hold			
Democratic hold			
Democratic hold			

=== District 29A ===
==== Republican primary ====
Maryland House of Delegates District 29A Republican primary election, 2010
Party	Candidate	Votes	%
Republican	Matt Morgan	1,596	55.7
Republican	Joe DiMarco	918	32.1
Republican	Henry E. Camaioni	349	12.2

==== General election ====
Maryland House of Delegates District 29A election, 2010
Party	Candidate	Votes	%
Democratic	John F. Wood Jr. (incumbent)	7,379	50.9
Republican	Matt Morgan	7,096	49.0
Write-in		9	0.1
Democratic hold			

=== District 29B ===
Maryland House of Delegates District 29B election, 2010
Party	Candidate	Votes	%
Democratic	John L. Bohanan Jr. (incumbent)	7,654	52.4
Republican	Erik Anderson	6,946	47.5
Write-in		11	0.1
Democratic hold			

=== District 29C ===
Maryland House of Delegates District 29C election, 2010
Party	Candidate	Votes	%
Republican	Tony O'Donnell (incumbent)	8,009	56.8
Democratic	Chris Davies	5,610	39.8
Libertarian	Shawn P. Quinn	474	3.4
Write-in		11	0.1
Republican hold			

=== District 30 ===
==== Democratic primary ====
Maryland House of Delegates District 30 Democratic primary election, 2010
Party	Candidate	Votes	%
Democratic	Michael E. Busch (incumbent)	7,495	31.9
Democratic	Virginia P. Clagett (incumbent)	7,429	31.6
Democratic	Judd Legum	5,798	24.7
Democratic	Shirley May Little	2,779	11.8

==== General election ====
Maryland House of Delegates District 30 election, 2010
Party	Candidate	Votes	%
Republican	Ron George (incumbent)	25,631	19.2
Democratic	Michael E. Busch (incumbent)	23,995	18.0
Republican	Herbert H. McMillan	22,553	16.9
Democratic	Virginia P. Clagett (incumbent)	21,142	15.9
Republican	Seth A. Howard	20,080	15.1
Democratic	Judd Legum	19,670	14.8
Write-in		89	0.1
Democratic hold			
Republican hold			
Republican gain from Democratic			

=== District 31 ===
==== Republican primary ====
Maryland House of Delegates District 31 Republican primary election, 2010
Party	Candidate	Votes	%
Republican	Nic Kipke (incumbent)	6,043	30.4
Republican	Steve Schuh (incumbent)	5,817	29.3
Republican	Don H. Dwyer Jr. (incumbent)	5,470	27.5
Republican	James C. Braswell	2,528	12.7

==== Democratic primary ====
Maryland House of Delegates District 31 Democratic primary election, 2010
Party	Candidate	Votes	%
Democratic	Robert L. Eckert	4,226	27.7
Democratic	Jeremiah Chiappelli	4,117	27.0
Democratic	Justin M. Towles	4,109	26.9
Democratic	Stan Janor	2,812	18.4

==== General election ====
Maryland House of Delegates District 31 election, 2010
Party	Candidate	Votes	%
Republican	Nic Kipke (incumbent)	24,143	22.0
Republican	Steve Schuh (incumbent)	22,805	20.7
Republican	Don H. Dwyer Jr. (incumbent)	22,452	20.4
Democratic	Jeremiah Chiappelli	12,943	11.8
Democratic	Justin M. Towles	11,968	10.9
Democratic	Robert L. Eckert	11,856	10.8
Libertarian	Joshua Matthew Crandall	2,015	1.8
Constitution	Cory Faust Sr.	1,660	1.5
Write-in		105	0.1
Republican hold			
Republican hold			
Republican hold			

=== District 32 ===
==== Republican primary ====
Maryland House of Delegates District 32 Republican primary election, 2010
Party	Candidate	Votes	%
Republican	Wayne Smith	4,021	28.3
Republican	Stephanie A. Hodges	3,793	26.7
Republican	David P. Starr	2,369	16.7
Republican	George Law	2,056	14.5
Republican	Derick D. Young	1,969	13.9

==== General election ====
Maryland House of Delegates District 32 election, 2010
Party	Candidate	Votes	%
Democratic	Pamela Beidle (incumbent)	20,409	19.0
Democratic	Theodore J. Sophocleus (incumbent)	18,947	17.7
Democratic	Mary Ann Love (incumbent)	18,830	17.6
Republican	Stephanie A. Hodges	17,477	16.3
Republican	Wayne Smith	16,865	15.7
Republican	David P. Starr	14,582	13.6
Write-in		123	0.1
Democratic hold			
Democratic hold			
Democratic hold			

=== District 33A ===
==== Republican primary ====
Maryland House of Delegates District 33A Republican primary election, 2010
Party	Candidate	Votes	%
Republican	Cathy Vitale	5,195	31.4
Republican	Tony McConkey (incumbent)	3,176	19.2
Republican	Vic Bernson	3,086	18.6
Republican	Sid Saab	3,011	18.2
Republican	David Boschert	2,099	12.7

==== General election ====
Maryland House of Delegates District 33A election, 2010
Party	Candidate	Votes	%
Republican	Cathy Vitale	24,046	41.7
Republican	Tony McConkey (incumbent)	18,612	32.3
Democratic	Madonna Brennan	14,818	25.7
Write-in		210	0.4
Republican hold			
Republican hold			

=== District 33B ===
==== Republican primary ====
Maryland House of Delegates District 33B Republican primary election, 2010
Party	Candidate	Votes	%
Republican	Robert A. Costa (incumbent)	2,726	67.2
Republican	Tom Angelis	1,329	32.8

==== General election ====
Maryland House of Delegates District 33B election, 2010
Party	Candidate	Votes	%
Republican	Robert A. Costa (incumbent)	14,625	98.8
Write-in		181	1.2
Republican hold			

=== District 34A ===
==== Republican primary ====
Maryland House of Delegates District 34A Republican primary election, 2010
Party	Candidate	Votes	%
Republican	Patrick McGrady	2,154	34.0
Republican	Glen Glass	2,033	32.1
Republican	Randolph Craig	1,592	25.2
Republican	John M. Paff Jr.	549	8.7

==== Democratic primary ====
Maryland House of Delegates District 34A Democratic primary election, 2010
Party	Candidate	Votes	%
Democratic	Mary-Dulany James (incumbent)	3,146	37.6
Democratic	Marla Posey-Moss	2,639	31.5
Democratic	B. Daniel Riley (incumbent)	2,582	30.9

==== General election ====
Maryland House of Delegates District 34A election, 2010
Party	Candidate	Votes	%
Democratic	Mary-Dulany James (incumbent)	12,639	29.2
Republican	Glen Glass	10,931	25.3
Republican	Patrick McGrady	9,889	22.9
Democratic	Marla Posey-Moss	9,745	22.5
Write-in		51	0.1
Democratic hold			
Republican gain from Democratic			

=== District 34B ===
==== Democratic primary ====
Maryland House of Delegates District 34B Democratic primary election, 2010
Party	Candidate	Votes	%
Democratic	David D. Rudolph (incumbent)	2,136	79.1
Democratic	Joe Janusz	566	20.9

==== General election ====
Maryland House of Delegates District 34B election, 2010
Party	Candidate	Votes	%
Democratic	David D. Rudolph (incumbent)	7,097	48.7
Republican	Theodore A. Patterson	6,700	46.0
Constitution	Michael W. Dawson	773	5.3
Write-in		3	0.0
Democratic hold			

=== District 35A ===
==== Republican primary ====
Maryland House of Delegates District 35A Republican primary election, 2010
Party	Candidate	Votes	%
Republican	Donna Stifler (incumbent)	5,406	28.8
Republican	H. Wayne Norman Jr. (incumbent)	4,849	25.8
Republican	Jason C. Gallion	3,958	21.1
Republican	Dave Tritt	2,716	14.5
Republican	Dave Seman	1,843	9.8

==== General election ====
Maryland House of Delegates District 35A election, 2010
Party	Candidate	Votes	%
Republican	Donna Stifler (incumbent)	24,058	38.0
Republican	H. Wayne Norman Jr. (incumbent)	23,819	37.6
Democratic	John W. Jones	8,502	13.4
Democratic	Joseph J. Gutierrez	6,867	10.8
Write-in		111	0.2
Republican hold			
Republican hold			

=== District 35B ===
Maryland House of Delegates District 35B election, 2010
Party	Candidate	Votes	%
Republican	Susan K. McComas	12,817	72.3
Democratic	John Janowich	4,884	27.6
Write-in		24	0.1
Republican hold			

=== District 36 ===
==== Republican primary ====
Maryland House of Delegates District 36 Republican primary election, 2010
Party	Candidate	Votes	%
Republican	Jay A. Jacobs (Kent)	8,685	30.9
Republican	Michael D. Smigiel Sr. (Cecil, incumbent)	8,608	30.7
Republican	Steve Hershey (Queen Anne's)	5,449	19.4
Republican	Richard A. Sossi (Queen Anne's, incumbent)	5,325	19.0

==== General election ====
Maryland House of Delegates District 36 election, 2010
Party	Candidate	Votes	%
Republican	Steve Hershey (Queen Anne's)	32,364	26.9
Republican	Jay A. Jacobs (Kent)	26,979	22.4
Republican	Michael D. Smigiel Sr. (Cecil, incumbent)	26,295	21.8
Democratic	William C. Manlove (Cecil)	17,453	14.5
Democratic	Arthur Hock (Kent)	16,472	13.7
Write-in		970	0.8
Republican hold			
Republican hold			
Republican hold			

=== District 37A ===
==== Democratic primary ====
Maryland House of Delegates District 37A Democratic primary election, 2010
Party	Candidate	Votes	%
Democratic	Rudolph C. Cane (incumbent)	2,254	80.3
Democratic	Lavonzella "Von" Siggers	554	19.7

==== General election ====
Maryland House of Delegates District 37A election, 2010
Party	Candidate	Votes	%
Democratic	Rudolph C. Cane (incumbent)	6,604	63.2
Republican	Dustin Mills	3,828	36.7
Write-in		11	0.1
Democratic hold			

=== District 37B ===
Maryland House of Delegates District 37B election, 2010
Party	Candidate	Votes	%
Republican	Adelaide C. Eckardt (incumbent)	23,106	41.3
Republican	Jeannie Haddaway-Riccio (incumbent)	22,309	39.9
Democratic	Patrice L. Stanley	10,476	18.7
Write-in		82	0.1
Republican hold			
Republican hold			

=== District 38A ===
==== Republican primary ====
Maryland House of Delegates District 38A Republican primary election, 2010
Party	Candidate	Votes	%
Republican	Charles J. Otto	1,558	40.4
Republican	John K. Phoebus	1,185	30.7
Republican	John T. Cannon	732	19.0
Republican	Julie D. Brewington	384	10.0

==== General election ====
Maryland House of Delegates District 38A election, 2010
Party	Candidate	Votes	%
Republican	Charles J. Otto	8,714	62.1
Democratic	Michael K. McCready	5,293	37.7
Write-in		19	0.1
Republican hold			

=== District 38B ===
==== Democratic primary ====
Maryland House of Delegates District 38B Democratic primary election, 2010
Party	Candidate	Votes	%
Democratic	Norman Conway (incumbent)	5,371	55.0
Democratic	Gee Williams	3,129	32.0
Democratic	Bernard John Hayden	1,266	13.0

==== Republican primary ====
Maryland House of Delegates District 38B Republican primary election, 2010
Party	Candidate	Votes	%
Republican	Mike McDermott	4,097	34.5
Republican	Marty Pusey	3,492	29.4
Republican	A. Kaye Kenney	2,943	24.8
Republican	Joe Schanno	1,337	11.3

==== General election ====
Maryland House of Delegates District 38B election, 2010
Party	Candidate	Votes	%
Democratic	Norman Conway (incumbent)	16,248	29.1
Republican	Mike McDermott	15,297	27.4
Republican	Marty Pusey	13,794	24.7
Democratic	Gee Williams	10,459	18.7
Write-in		25	0.0
Democratic hold			
Republican gain from Democratic			

=== District 39 ===
==== Democratic primary ====
Maryland House of Delegates District 39 Democratic primary election, 2010
Party	Candidate	Votes	%
Democratic	Charles E. Barkley (incumbent)	5,317	30.4
Democratic	Kirill Reznik (incumbent)	4,132	23.6
Democratic	Shane Robinson	3,290	18.8
Democratic	Robert J. Hydorn	1,972	11.3
Democratic	Tony Puca	1,541	8.8
Democratic	Arthur H. Jackson	1,223	7.0

==== General election ====
Maryland House of Delegates District 39 election, 2010
Party	Candidate	Votes	%
Democratic	Charles E. Barkley (incumbent)	18,060	23.5
Democratic	Kirill Reznik (incumbent)	16,199	21.1
Democratic	Shane Robinson	15,961	20.8
Republican	Jim Pettit	9,695	12.6
Republican	Bill Witham	8,482	11.1
Republican	Al Phillips	8,240	10.7
Write-in		79	0.1
Democratic hold			
Democratic hold			
Democratic hold			

=== District 40 ===
==== Democratic primary ====
Maryland House of Delegates District 40 Democratic primary election, 2010
Party	Candidate	Votes	%
Democratic	Frank M. Conaway Jr. (incumbent)	6,306	30.0
Democratic	Shawn Z. Tarrant (incumbent)	6,046	28.7
Democratic	Barbara A. Robinson (incumbent)	5,958	28.3
Democratic	Will J. Hanna, Jr.	2,740	13.0

==== General election ====
Maryland House of Delegates District 40 election, 2010
Party	Candidate	Votes	%
Democratic	Frank M. Conaway Jr. (incumbent)	19,028	37.5
Democratic	Barbara A. Robinson (incumbent)	15,988	31.5
Democratic	Shawn Z. Tarrant (incumbent)	15,378	30.3
Write-in		324	0.6
Democratic hold			
Democratic hold			
Democratic hold			

=== District 41 ===
Maryland House of Delegates District 41 election, 2010
Party	Candidate	Votes	%
Democratic	Jill P. Carter (incumbent)	24,985	33.5
Democratic	Samuel I. Rosenberg (incumbent)	22,654	30.4
Democratic	Nathaniel T. Oaks (incumbent)	21,931	29.4
Republican	Mark Ehrlichmann	4,723	6.3
Write-in		207	0.3
Democratic hold			
Democratic hold			
Democratic hold			

=== District 42 ===
==== Republican primary ====
Maryland House of Delegates District 42 Republican primary election, 2010
Party	Candidate	Votes	%
Republican	Susan L. M. Aumann (incumbent)	4,885	30.6
Republican	William J. Frank (incumbent)	4,642	29.1
Republican	John C. Fiastro Jr.	3,310	20.8
Republican	Jack Gordon	1,930	12.1
Republican	Nicholas Charles Pepersack	1,182	7.4

==== Democratic primary ====
Maryland House of Delegates District 42 Democratic primary election, 2010
Party	Candidate	Votes	%
Democratic	Stephen W. Lafferty (incumbent)	8,081	29.4
Democratic	Lori Albin	6,458	23.5
Democratic	Oz Bengur	5,424	19.7
Democratic	David Kosak	4,104	14.9
Democratic	Art Buist	3,405	12.4

==== General election ====
Maryland House of Delegates District 42 election, 2010
Party	Candidate	Votes	%
Republican	Susan L. M. Aumann (incumbent)	21,540	18.9
Republican	William J. Frank (incumbent)	19,797	17.4
Democratic	Stephen W. Lafferty (incumbent)	19,503	17.1
Democratic	Lori Albin	18,036	15.9
Republican	John C. Fiastro Jr.	17,974	15.8
Democratic	Oz Bengur	16,859	14.8
Write-in		73	0.1
Republican hold			
Republican hold			
Democratic hold			

=== District 43 ===
==== Democratic primary ====
Maryland House of Delegates District 43 Democratic primary election, 2010
Party	Candidate	Votes	%
Democratic	Maggie McIntosh (incumbent)	9,780	28.2
Democratic	Curt Anderson (incumbent)	9,739	28.1
Democratic	Mary L. Washington	8,705	25.1
Democratic	Kelly Fox	3,740	10.8
Democratic	Rodney C. Burris	1,880	5.4
Democratic	Leon Winthly Hector, Sr.	809	2.3

==== General election ====
Maryland House of Delegates District 43 election, 2010
Party	Candidate	Votes	%
Democratic	Curt Anderson (incumbent)	24,831	35.1
Democratic	Maggie McIntosh (incumbent)	23,266	32.9
Democratic	Mary L. Washington	22,334	31.6
Write-in		312	0.4
Democratic hold			
Democratic hold			
Democratic hold			

=== District 44 ===
==== Democratic primary ====
Maryland House of Delegates District 44 Democratic primary election, 2010
Party	Candidate	Votes	%
Democratic	Keith E. Haynes (incumbent)	4,859	25.9
Democratic	Keiffer Mitchell Jr.	4,481	23.9
Democratic	Melvin L. Stukes (incumbent)	3,321	17.7
Democratic	Ruth M. Kirk (incumbent)	2,860	15.3
Democratic	Chris Blake	973	5.2
Democratic	Gary T. English	907	4.8
Democratic	Arlene B. Fisher	876	4.7
Democratic	Billy Taylor	462	2.5

==== General election ====
Maryland House of Delegates District 44 election, 2010
Party	Candidate	Votes	%
Democratic	Keiffer Mitchell Jr.	15,068	32.0
Democratic	Keith E. Haynes (incumbent)	14,879	31.6
Democratic	Melvin L. Stukes (incumbent)	13,994	29.7
Republican	Brian D. Jones	1,837	3.9
Republican	Trae Lewis	1,224	2.6
Write-in		100	0.2
Democratic hold			
Democratic hold			
Democratic hold			

=== District 45 ===
==== Democratic primary ====
Maryland House of Delegates District 45 Democratic primary election, 2010
Party	Candidate	Votes	%
Democratic	Talmadge Branch (incumbent)	6,219	27.4
Democratic	Cheryl Glenn (incumbent)	6,022	26.5
Democratic	Hattie N. Harrison (incumbent)	5,537	24.4
Democratic	Kevin W. Parson	3,002	13.2
Democratic	Jamaal D. Simpson	1,905	8.4

==== General election ====
Maryland House of Delegates District 45 election, 2010
Party	Candidate	Votes	%
Democratic	Talmadge Branch (incumbent)	18,676	30.0
Democratic	Cheryl Glenn (incumbent)	18,232	29.3
Democratic	Hattie N. Harrison (incumbent)	17,564	28.2
Republican	Rick Saffery	2,799	4.5
Republican	Larry O. Wardlow, Jr.	2,622	4.2
Libertarian	Ronald M. Owens-Bey	2,309	3.7
Write-in		84	0.1
Democratic hold			
Democratic hold			
Democratic hold			

=== District 46 ===
==== Democratic primary ====
Maryland House of Delegates District 46 Democratic primary election, 2010
Party	Candidate	Votes	%
Democratic	Peter A. Hammen (incumbent)	5,632	26.0
Democratic	Brian K. McHale (incumbent)	4,128	19.0
Democratic	Luke Clippinger	4,052	18.7
Democratic	Bill Romani	3,410	15.7
Democratic	Jason Filippou	2,503	11.5
Democratic	Melissa A. Techentin	1,962	9.0

==== General election ====
Maryland House of Delegates District 46 election, 2010
Party	Candidate	Votes	%
Democratic	Peter A. Hammen (incumbent)	15,367	29.6
Democratic	Brian K. McHale (incumbent)	14,871	28.6
Democratic	Luke Clippinger	14,159	27.3
Republican	Roger Bedingfield	7,338	14.1
Write-in		205	0.4
Democratic hold			
Democratic hold			
Democratic hold			

=== District 47 ===
==== Democratic primary ====
Maryland House of Delegates District 47 Democratic primary election, 2010
Party	Candidate	Votes	%
Democratic	Jolene Ivey (incumbent)	5,071	28.1
Democratic	Doyle Niemann (incumbent)	3,335	18.5
Democratic	Michael G. Summers	2,882	16.0
Democratic	Diana M. Fennell	2,101	11.6
Democratic	Wanda Shelton Martin	1,660	9.2
Democratic	Lamar A. Thorpe	1,310	7.3
Democratic	Anthony Cicoria	1,036	5.7
Democratic	Fred Price Jr.	650	3.6

==== General election ====
Maryland House of Delegates District 47 election, 2010
Party	Candidate	Votes	%
Democratic	Jolene Ivey (incumbent)	14,404	35.4
Democratic	Michael G. Summers	12,337	30.3
Democratic	Doyle Niemann (incumbent)	11,925	29.3
Republican	Rachel Audi	1,853	4.6
Write-in		150	0.4
Democratic hold			
Democratic hold			
Democratic hold			

== See also ==
- Elections in Maryland
- 2010 United States elections
- 2010 Maryland gubernatorial election
- 2010 Maryland Attorney General election
- 2010 United States Senate election in Maryland
- 2010 Maryland Comptroller election
- 2010 United States House of Representatives elections in Maryland
- 2010 United States gubernatorial elections
- 2010 Maryland Senate election
