= 2010 Maryland General Assembly election =

2010 Maryland General Assembly election may refer to:

- 2010 Maryland Senate election
- 2010 Maryland House of Delegates election
