= 2007 Baltimore mayoral election =

- November 6, 2007
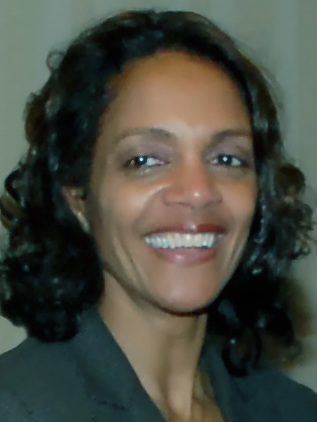

Candidate	Sheila Dixon	Elbert Henderson
Party	Democratic	Republican
Popular vote	36,726	5,139
Percentage	86.28%	12.07%
Mayor before election
Sheila Dixon
Democratic
Elected mayor
Sheila Dixon
Democratic

The 2007 Baltimore mayoral election was held on November 6, 2007. Because Baltimore's electorate is overwhelmingly Democratic, Sheila Dixon's victory in the Democratic primary on September 11 all but assured her of victory in the general election; she defeated Republican candidate Elbert Henderson in the general election by an overwhelming majority. Dixon, who as president of the Baltimore City Council became mayor in January 2007 when Martin O'Malley resigned to become Governor of Maryland, was the first woman to be elected to the office.

== Background and candidates ==
Martin O'Malley, the winner of the previous mayoral election, was elected governor of Maryland in 2006. Therefore, city council president Sheila Dixon became mayor for the final year of what had been O'Malley's term, and subsequently ran for reelection to a full term. Other candidates for the Democratic nomination included city councilman Keiffer J. Mitchell Jr.; Andrey Bundley, a former school administrator who was O'Malley's only major opponent for the Democratic nomination in 2003; Frank M. Conaway Sr., the only person, other than Dixon, in the race to have won a citywide election, who withdrew before the primary, Maryland state delegate Jill P. Carter; and perennial Baltimore-area candidate and social activist A. Robert Kaufman. Elbert Henderson was the sole candidate for the Republican nomination; he was the Republican nominee in the previous election, losing by a wide margin to O'Malley. Kweisi Mfume, former Congressman and president of the NAACP, was at one point rumored to be considering a run, but ultimately chose not to join the race. The Green Party did not nominate a mayoral candidate.

Dixon had the advantage of incumbency, but Mitchell, who was seen as the mayor's most prominent opponent, hoped to overcome that advantage with a grassroots campaign. The beginning of Dixon's term and campaign was dogged by an ethics investigation, although the city's Board of Ethics ultimately found no reason to prosecute her. An upsurge of violent crime in Baltimore during the first half of 2007 affected early campaigning. Dixon launched a number of anti-crime initiatives, focusing on illegal guns. Mitchell's initial campaign moves focused on crime; Carter, criticizing Dixon's administration for what she called overzealous policing, promised a total revamp of the police department, stating that "if we had leadership in this city, we would have already changed police commissioners." The Baltimore police commissioner later resigned his post on July 19, in an act that some observers felt would affect the course of the race.

=== July 2007 ===
With less than two months remaining before the Democratic primary, Carter officially announced her candidacy, and poll of likely Democratic voters commissioned by the Baltimore Sun showed Mayor Dixon holding a comfortable lead over her nearest challenger. The poll, released on July 16, 2007, had Dixon leading Councilman Mitchell with 47 percent of the likely primary voters to Mitchell's 15 percent. The rest of the field was in single digits, below the poll's margin of error, with 28 percent undecided. Although candidates would not be required to release fundraising numbers until August, Dixon was reported to have sizeable lead in this area as well.

=== August 2007 ===
With little more than a month left until the primary election, Dixon further distanced herself from her primary opponents. On August 3, 2007, Mitchell's father resigned as treasurer of his son's mayoral campaign after it was discovered that he spent more than $40,000 in campaign funds for personal expenses. Despite this incident, Mitchell said that his campaign remained focused on the problems facing Baltimore City. Meanwhile, Carter focused her campaign on the impending 50% BGE rate hike calling for re-regulation, reforming public education, and effective policing, and restoring integrity to City Hall while continuing her attack on Dixon by charging her with not showing at local political forums and for sending city employees in her stead. At a press conference outside City Hall, Carter and a campaign worker dressed in a yellow chicken suit handed out copies of a letter she sent to the State Ethics commission complaining about the practice.

=== September 2007 ===
Just over a week before election day, a September 2 Baltimore Sun poll had Dixon maintaining her strong lead. According to the Sun, "Dixon leads City Councilman Keiffer J. Mitchell Jr. by 46 percent to 19 percent – a 27 percentage-point spread – according to the poll conducted by OpinionWorks, an independent Annapolis-based firm." According to a number of experts, the race never really became competitive. Lenneal J. Henderson, a professor at the University of Baltimore's School of Public Affairs, said, "I think it is over. It would take a huge misstep on the part of Sheila Dixon for her not to win this one." Bundley (4%) and Carter (2%) showed no improvement over the previously released July poll.

== Democratic Primary ==
On the night of the primary, less than three hours after the polls closed, Mitchell conceded defeat and Dixon claimed victory in the primary election.

=== Televised debate ===
On Monday night, August 27, 2007, all eight democratic candidates for Mayor appeared in a debate televised by Maryland Public Television and WBAL-TV. During his introduction, candidate Conaway announced that he was withdrawing from the race and throwing "his money and support" behind candidate Mitchell. The debate lasted fifty-five minutes with each candidate giving an opening and closing statement and answering questions posed by reporters in between. The debate was sponsored by the League of Women Voters and the Greater Baltimore Committee.

=== Fundraising ===
Baltimore's WJZ-TV reported that the Dixon campaign said that as of August 30, it had more than $480,000 left to spend in the final two weeks before the September 11th Democratic primary. Carter's campaign reported having just over $8,000 on hand, and Bundley's campaign reported having $15,000 left as of the mid August 2007 campaign reporting date. Mitchell had just over $115,000 in cash on hand as of August 26.

=== Primary election results ===
These are the final, official results for the Democratic primary, as reported on the city of Baltimore's election board Web site.

Candidate	Votes	%
Sheila Dixon	54,381	63.1%
Keiffer J. Mitchell Jr.	20,376	23.7%
Andrey Bundley	6,543	7.6%
Jill P. Carter	2,372	2.8%
A. Robert Kaufman	885	1.0%
Mike Schaefer	762	0.9%
Frank Conaway	533	0.6%
Phillip Brown	273	0.3%

Elbert Henderson ran unopposed in the Republican primary.

== General election campaign ==
Because of the city's overwhelmingly Democratic tilt, campaigning largely ceased after the primary, with Dixon and other citywide candidates maintaining "bare-bones" campaign staffs. On a low-turnout general election day, Dixon defeated her Republican challenger with more than 86 percent of the vote.

=== Mayoral endorsements ===
A number of city groups offered endorsements of the various candidates over the course of the campaign:

Democratic Party
Republican Party

Candidate	Endorser	Date of Endorsement	Comments
Andrey Bundley	none listed yet		no endorsements listed on campaign web-site
Phillip Brown	none listed yet		no campaign web-site yet
Jill P. Carter	ACORN	July 31, 2007	Community organization that spearheaded campaign for Question P in 2002
~~Frank Conaway~~	Withdrew 8/27/07		
Sheila Dixon	SEIU	June 12, 2007	national union of service workers, with local in Baltimore
	United Auto Workers	June 20, 2007	
	Laborers Baltimore Washington Council	July 12, 2007	national union of construction laborers and public employees representing 5,000 laborers in Baltimore
	Md & DC State Council of Machinists	July 2, 2007	all machinists locals in Baltimore
	UNITE HERE	July 12, 2007	represents 20,000 hospitality, food service, laundry, retail and apparel workers in Baltimore and the surrounding region.
	Mid-Atlantic Regional Council of Carpenters	July 14, 2007	represents 12,000 members
	Baltimore Retired Police Benevolent Union	July 14, 2007	represents retired Baltimore police officers.
	Baltimore AFL-CIO	July 19, 2007	all AFL-CIO affiliated unions in Baltimore
	Peter Franchot	July 24, 2007	Maryland state comptroller, polled well in Baltimore City
	Elijah Cummings	August 12, 2007	Maryland congressman, polled well in Baltimore City
	Martin O'Malley	August 13, 2007	Maryland governor, polled well in Baltimore City
	Kweisi Mfume	August 13, 2007	former Maryland congressman, former head of the NAACP
	Progressive Maryland	August 22, 2007	statewide progressive organization with over 1,000 Baltimore members
	The Baltimore Sun	September 2, 2007	Baltimore's major daily newspaper
	The Baltimore Afro-American	August 25, 2007	published weekly
~~Desiree Dotson~~	Withdrew – 19 March 2007		
A. Robert Kaufman	none listed yet		no endorsements listed on campaign web-site
Keiffer J. Mitchell Jr.	Douglas Gansler	January, 2007	Maryland Attorney General
	Baltimore FOP	July 24, 2007	organization of police officers
	Baltimore City Sheriff's Office Lodge	July 31, 2007	organization of deputy sheriffs
	Baltimore City Firefighters Local 734	August 9, 2007	organization of active and retired firefighters
	Baltimore City Fire Officers Local 964	August 9, 2007	organization of active and retired fire officers
	Frank Conaway	August 27, 2007	Baltimore City Clerk of the Courts, former 2007 mayoral candidate.
	City Paper	September 5, 2007	Baltimore City alternative newspaper, published weekly
Mike Schaefer	none listed yet		no endorsements listed on campaign web-site
Elbert Henderson	none listed		no web-site yet

=== General election results ===
These are the official results for the general election, as reported on the city of Baltimore's election board Web site.

Candidate	Votes	%
Sheila Dixon	36,726	86.28%
Elbert Henderson	5,139	12.07%

=== Other city elections ===
All other Baltimore city officers were also up for election simultaneously with the mayor, including the fourteen members of the Baltimore City Council (elected from single-member districts) and the City Council President and City Comptroller (both elected citywide). Incumbent comptroller Joan Pratt ran unopposed in both the Democratic primary and the general election, and none of the twelve council members seeking re-election faced serious competition in either election; one ran unopposed in the primary and seven ran unopposed in the general election. All fourteen council members returned in the general election were Democrats, as has been the case in every election since 1939.

The race for the Democratic nomination for City Council President was perhaps the closest of the election cycle. The two major candidates were incumbent Stephanie Rawlings Blake, a former council member who had been appointed to fill the position with Dixon became mayor, and Michael Sarbanes, a community activist and the son of former United States Senator Paul Sarbanes and brother of U.S. Congressman John Sarbanes. A July poll had the two virtually tied, with 27 percent of respondents favoring Sarbanes and 26 percent favoring Rawlings Blake, with Councilman Kenneth N. Harris Sr. a distant third at 8 percent. Rawlings Blake subsequently overtook Sarbanes, however, and won the primary election with 49 percent of the vote to Sarbanes' 38 percent. In the general election, the incumbent handily defeated her only opponent, Green candidate Maria Allwine, garnering 82 percent of the vote.
