= William H. Cole IV =

American politician (born 1972)

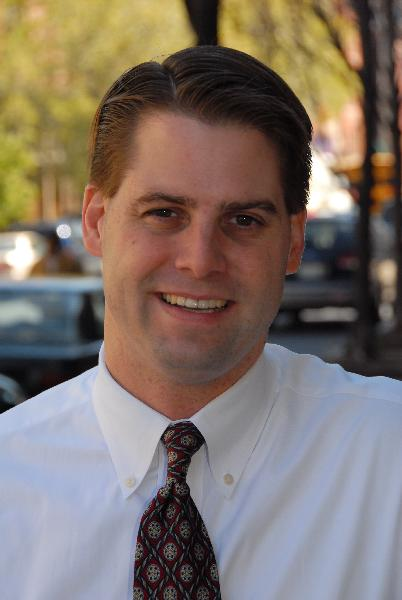
- Cole in 2007

Member of the Baltimore City Council from the 11th District
- In office December 6, 2007 – August 30, 2014
- Preceded by: Keiffer Mitchell Jr.
- Succeeded by: Eric Costello

Member of the Maryland House of Delegates from the 47A district
- In office February 19, 1999 – January 8, 2003
- Preceded by: Timothy D. Murphy
- Succeeded by: Doyle Niemann

Personal details
- Born: November 21, 1972 (age 53) Havre de Grace, Maryland, U.S.
- Party: Democratic
- Spouse: Michelle W. Cole
- Children: 3
- Education: University of Maryland, College Park (BA); University of Baltimore (MA)
- Profession: politician; higher education administrator

William H. Cole IV (born November 21, 1972) is an American politician who represented the 11th District on the Baltimore City Council. He was first elected to a four-year term beginning in December 2007 and served until his appointment by the mayor in August 2014 as CEO and president of the Baltimore Development Corporation.

== Early life ==
William H. Cole IV was born on November 21, 1972, in Havre de Grace, Maryland. He attended Loyola Blakefield High School in Towson, Maryland, and graduated with a B.A. in government and politics from the University of Maryland, College Park in 1994. He graduated with a M.A. in legal and ethical studies from the University of Baltimore in 1996. Cole was a member of the Alpha Epsilon Lambda Honor Society.

== Public Service Career ==
Cole began his career in government as an intern in the Maryland Senate in 1994, then served two sessions as a legislative aide to former state senator Walter M. Baker, chairman of the judicial proceedings committee. In 1996, he was hired by Congressman Elijah Cummings (MD-07) as staff assistant and later special assistant managing one of three district offices. He remained on the congressman's full-time staff until January 2003.

Cole was elected to the Maryland Democratic State Central Committee in 1998 and in January 1999 was appointed by Governor Parris N. Glendenning to fill the district 47A seat in the Maryland House of Delegates seat vacated by Timothy D. Murphy. He served on the House Judiciary Committee, its Family & Juvenile Law Subcommittee, and the House Special Committee on Drug & Alcohol Abuse. The 2002 legislative redistricting process eliminated Baltimore's 47th Legislative District in Baltimore City and Cole lost to three incumbents in the newly formed 46th Legislative District in September 2002.

First elected to the 11th District of the Baltimore City Council in September 2007 after defeating 8 other primary opponents, Cole was re-elected in 2011 winning 75% of the vote. During his two terms on the City Council, Cole chaired a number of standing and special committees including Taxation, Finance & Economic Development, Executive Nominations, Housing & Community Development, Recreation & Parks and the Special Committees on Property Tax Reduction, New Homeowners Tax Credit, and the Maritime Industrial Overlay District Review. He also served as a member the Land Use & Transportation, Budget & Appropriates, Health, Education, and Public Safety Committees.

He was elected as a delegate to the Democratic National Convention in Charlotte from the 3rd Congressional District in 2012.

In August 2014, Cole resigned from the Baltimore City Council after he was appointed President & CEO of the Baltimore Development Corporation (BDC) by Mayor Stephanie Rawlings-Blake. During his time at BDC, he led Baltimore's business recovery efforts after the 2015 Freddie Gray protests and spearheaded the efforts to keep the Preakness Stakes in Baltimore.

In April 2019, he announced that he was leaving BDC to join former Howard County Executive Ken Ulman as a partner in Ulman's consulting firm, Margrave Strategies.

== Community service ==
Cole has served on more than a dozen boards & commissions including the Downtown Partnership of Baltimore, Waterfront Partnership of Baltimore, Visit Baltimore, the Baltimore Hotel Corporation, Midtown Community Benefits District. Since 2013, he has chaired Cecil Bank and its holding company, Cecil Bancorp, Inc., leading the state-chartered financial institution through two recapitalizations and a release from a 2010 regulatory "written agreement" the bank operated under until 2022.

Cole is a 2018 fellow in equitable economic development at the Rose Center for Public Leadership, a partnership with the Urban Land Institute and the National League of Cities. He is a 2012 alumnus of the American Swiss Foundation Young Leaders Conference and a member of the 2012 class of New Deal Leaders.

In October 2022, he was appointed by Senate President Bill Ferguson to the Maryland Stadium Authority Board of Directors. He helped create the Maryland Thoroughbred Racing Operating Authority in 2023.

== Personal life ==
Cole and his wife, Michelle, have three children and live in the Otterbein neighborhood of downtown Baltimore.
