= Keiffer Mitchell Jr. =

American politician (born 1967)

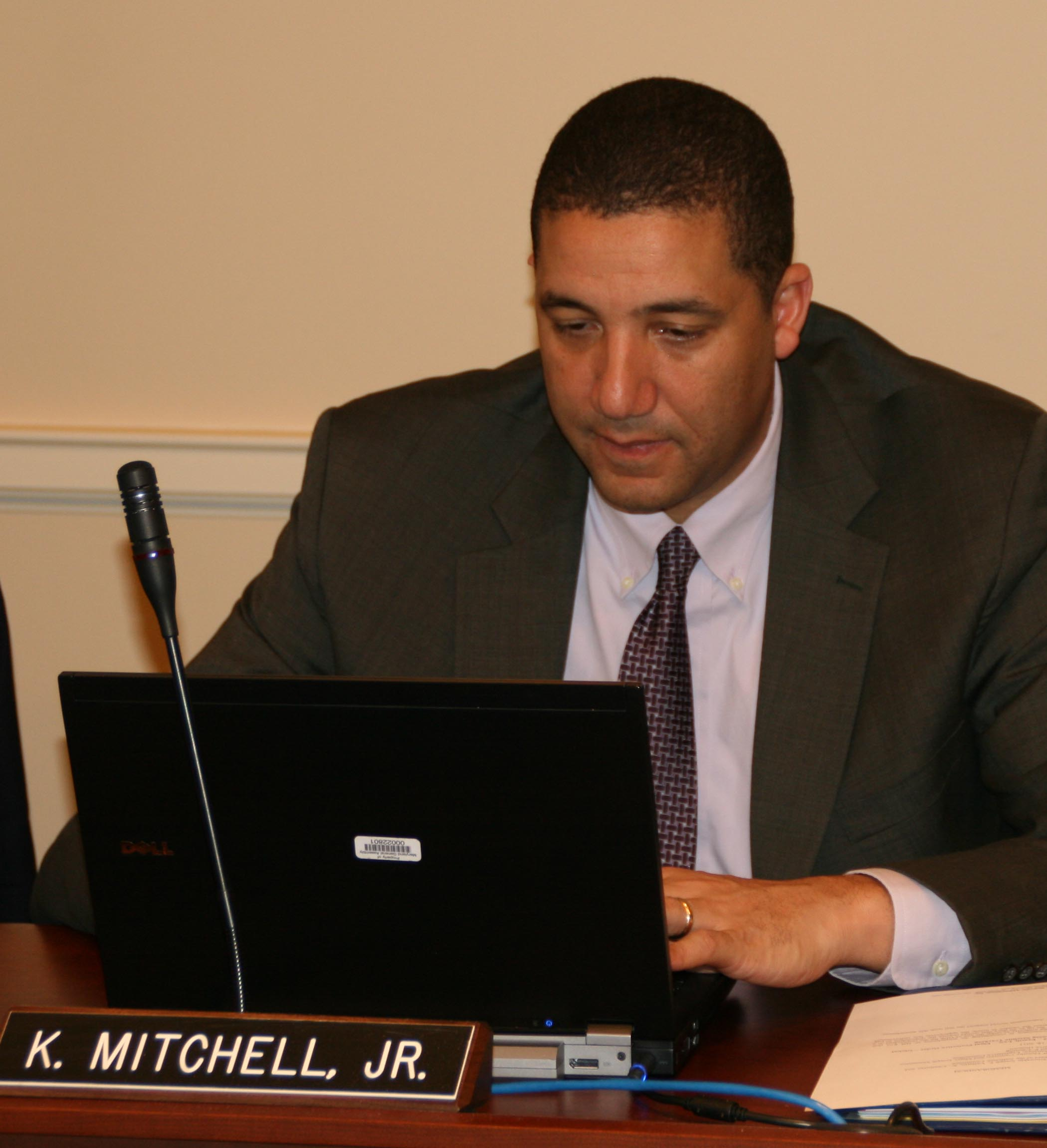
- Mitchell in 2011

Chief of Staff to the Governor of Maryland
- Acting
- In office August 17, 2020 – October 26, 2020
- Governor: Larry Hogan
- Preceded by: Roy McGrath
- Succeeded by: Amelia Chassé Alcivar

Member of the Maryland House of Delegates from the 44th district
- In office January 12, 2011 – January 14, 2015
- Preceded by: Ruth M. Kirk
- Succeeded by: Keith E. Haynes (redistricting)

Member of the Baltimore City Council
- In office December 7, 1995 – December 6, 2007
- Preceded by: Lawrence A. Bell
- Succeeded by: William H. Cole IV
- Constituency: 4th district (1995–2004); 11th district (2004–2007)

Personal details
- Born: September 28, 1967 (age 59) Baltimore, Maryland, U.S.
- Party: Democratic
- Spouse: Nicole Kramer
- Children: 2
- Relatives: Clarence Mitchell Jr. (grandfather); Juanita Jackson Mitchell (grandmother); Clarence Mitchell III (uncle); Parren Mitchell (uncle); Clarence Mitchell IV (cousin)

Keiffer Jackson Mitchell Jr. (born September 28, 1967) is an American politician and government official who served as the chief legislative officer for Maryland Governor Larry Hogan from 2019 to 2022. He also served as a senior advisor to Hogan from 2017 to 2019 and from 2020 to 2022, and as Hogan's acting chief of staff from August to October 2020. He is a member of the Democratic Party.

Born in Baltimore, Mitchell graduated from Emory University and the University of the District of Columbia School of Law. He began his career as a law clerk to the NAACP Legal Defense Fund and as a White House intern during the Clinton administration. Mitchell was elected to the Baltimore City Council in 1995, representing the 4th district from 1995 to 2004 and the 11th district from 2004 to 2007. He ran unsuccessfully for mayor of Baltimore in 2007, losing to incumbent mayor Sheila Dixon in the Democratic primary election. Mitchell was elected to represent the 44th district of the Maryland House of Delegates in 2010, but lost renomination in 2014 after redistricting drew him into District 44A.

== Early life and education ==
Mitchell was born in Baltimore, Maryland, on September 28, 1967, to Keiffer Mitchell, a physician, and Nannette Mitchell, a budget analyst for the Baltimore County Department of Social Services. He is the grandson of Clarence M. Mitchell Jr., and grandnephew of U.S. Representative Parren Mitchell. His uncle, Clarence Mitchell III, was a Maryland state senator, and his father's younger brother, Michael B. Mitchell Sr., was a Baltimore city councilmember and later Maryland state senator.

Mitchell was raised in Baltimore, living in the city's northeast before moving to Guilford. He graduated from the Boys' Latin School of Maryland in 1986, where he was active in basketball, tennis, and student government. Afterwards, Mitchell attended Emory University, where he helped organize demonstrations against racism in Forsyth County, Georgia, and earned a Bachelor of Arts degree in political science in 1990. He then attended the University of the District of Columbia, where he provided free legal help to people with HIV/AIDS and earned a Juris Doctor degree in 1994.

== Career ==
While attending Emory University, Mitchell worked on several several campaigns as an intern with the Democratic National Committee's Black Caucus and as a summer intern with the Democratic Senatorial Campaign Committee. Before being elected to the Baltimore City Council, he was law clerk for the NAACP Legal Defense Fund, a volunteer at the 1988 and 1992 Democratic National Conventions, and a White House intern in 1994. He never passed the bar examination and returned to Baltimore after graduating from UDC, where he taught history at the Boys' Latin School from 1995 to 2002. Afterwards, he stayed at home with his first child until April 2005, when he went back to work as a business development officer at The Harbor Bank of Maryland. He left Harbor Bank after he launched his campaign for mayor in January 2007, when the bank's president asked him to take unpaid leave after people who held campaign accounts in the bank objected to a perceived mix of banking and politics. In December 2007, after leaving the Baltimore City Council, he was appointed as a small business banking officer for Wachovia.

== Political involvement ==
Mitchell was a delegate to the 2000 and 2008 Democratic National Conventions. He was a member of the Baltimore City Democratic Central Committee from 2002 to 2010, serving as the second vice chair of the Maryland Democratic Party from 2002 to 2006.

=== Baltimore City Council ===
Mitchell was elected to the Baltimore City Council in 1995, representing the council's 4th district, which included parts of western and central Baltimore. During his campaign, he pledged to be an ambassador to businesses around the country and was endorsed by incumbent Lawrence A. Bell III, who ran for city council president. He was sworn in on December 7, 1995. During his tenure, Mitchell was the chair of the Taxation & Finance Committee and the Education & Human Resources Committee, and the vice chair of the Judiciary Committee.

During his tenure, Mitchell was known for doing most of his work through negotiations and amendments, and for having a strong relationship with the city's business community. A fiscal conservative, he opposed the city's decision to publicly finance the Hilton Baltimore and unsuccessfully supported proposals to lower the city's property tax rate and eliminate the city's energy tax. In his second term, he prioritized constituent services, prioritizing his office's resources to various communities known for drug activity and helping city residents who called his office despite not living in his district, and worked with the administration of Governor Bob Ehrlich to prevent Hedwin Corp., a plastics manufacturer in north Baltimore, from being taken over by a foreign business. In his this term, Mitchell negotiated a $42 million city loan to bail out the Baltimore City Public Schools system, which prevented the city from being dependent on a state loan. Mitchell also faced criticism for supporting a bill that would allow Mercy Medical Center to demolish several historical rowhouses, which he said would make way for a hospital expansion that would bring in millions of dollars in investment and create hundreds of jobs in the city's growing health care industry.

In April 1996, Baltimore mayor Kurt Schmoke appointed Mitchell to chair a task force to study the expansion of school choice in Baltimore. The task force released its final report in November 1996, recommending that the city open more magnet schools and college and career readiness programs, and to support state legislation that would allow the city to create publicly funded charter schools that would operate independent of Baltimore City Public Schools. At the same time, the task force recommended against providing tax-funded school vouchers that could be used at private and parochial schools.

In 1999, Mitchell worked on the "Draft Mfume" campaign, which sought to induce NAACP president Kweisi Mfume to run for mayor of Baltimore in 1999.

=== 2007 mayoral campaign ===
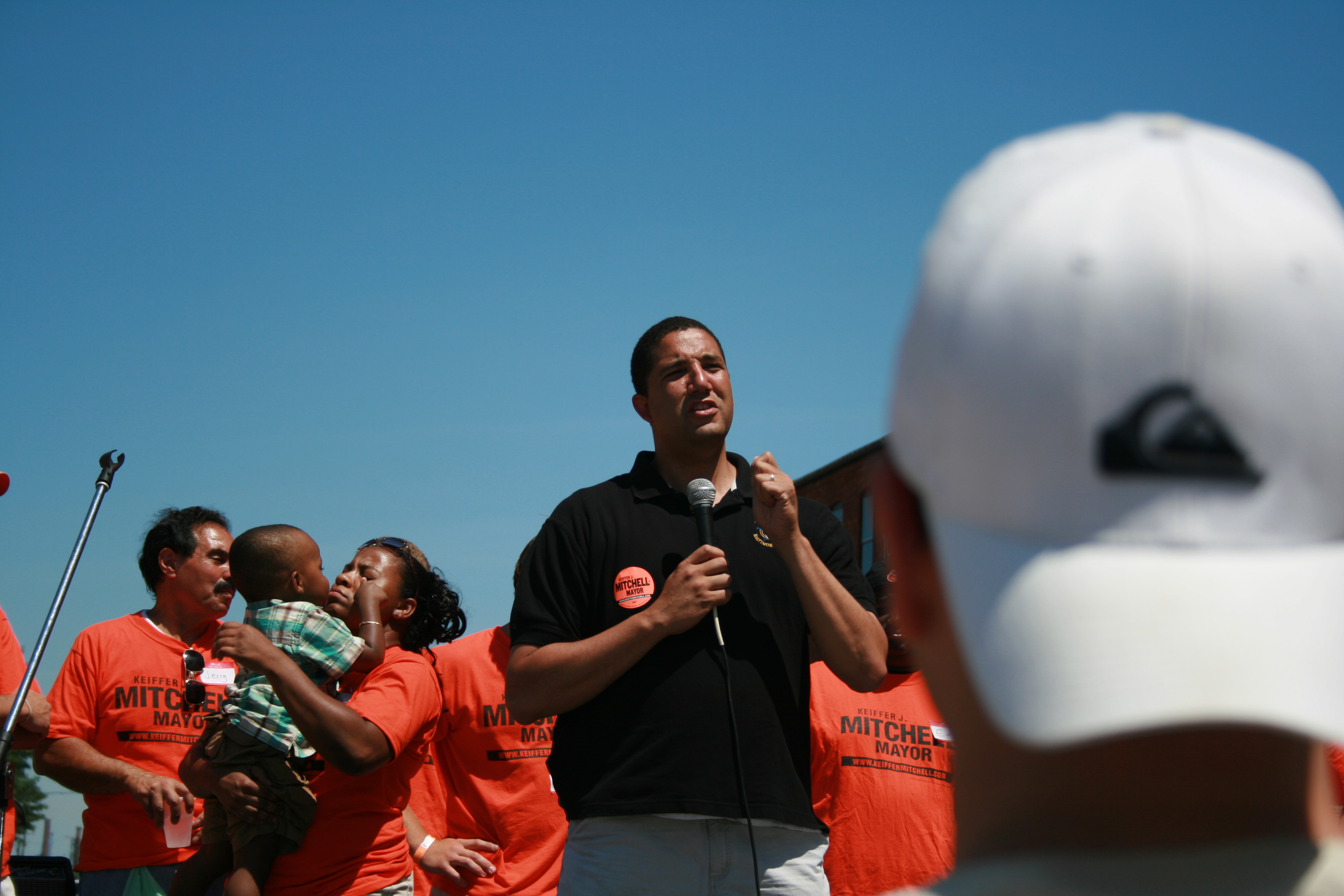
Mitchell campaigning for mayor, 2007

On January 5, 2007, Mitchell announced that he would run for mayor of Baltimore in 2007, challenging Sheila Dixon, who became mayor after Martin O'Malley was sworn in as governor of Maryland. During his campaign, he ran on a platform that included taking full control of Baltimore's school system, increased pay for teachers who work at the city's toughest schools, and instituting efficiency audits in every school to ensure that funds were being spent appropriately. He also supported reforms to the city's contracting process and increasing Baltimore Police Department hiring and funding. During the Democratic primary, Mitchell was seen as being a frontrunner in the Democratic primary alongside Dixon, though he trailed Dixon in fundraising and polling throughout the campaign and received virtually no support from Maryland's political establishment, outside of Maryland Attorney General Doug Gansler, Fraternal Order of Police Lodge 3, and the Baltimore Firefighters Union.

In August 2007, The Baltimore Sun reported that Mitchell's father resigned as the treasurer of his son's mayoral campaign after campaign aides discovered that he had spent more than $40,000 of his son's campaign funds for personal expenses over several months in violation of state law. In a statement following his resignation, Mitchell said that he would not be pressing charges, that his father had reimbursed the campaign money he had spent, and that his campaign would hire a second accountant to perform a thorough review of all of its finances. Mitchell's father defended his spending, saying through his attorneys, Billy Murphy Jr. and Larry S. Gibson, that the $14,000 he spent on a hotel was appropriate because the room was used for fundraising and that it was appropriate for him to write $7,220 in campaign checks out to cash. Jared DeMarinis, the director of the Maryland State Board of Elections' candidacy and campaign finance division, disputed this assertion, saying that campaign finance entities "may not directly or indirectly make any expenditure except by a check". Later that month, Mitchell's campaign reported an additional $16,000 in campaign funds that were inappropriately spent by his father.

Mitchell was defeated by Dixon in the Democratic primary election on September 11, 2007, placing second with 23.7 percent of the vote. He conceded the election to Dixon on the night of the election.

=== Maryland House of Delegates ===
Mitchell was elected to the Maryland House of Delegates in 2010, defeating incumbent state delegate Ruth M. Kirk in the Democratic primary election. He was sworn in on January 12, 2011, and served on the Judiciary Committee from 2011 to 2013, afterwards serving on the Economic Matters Committee until 2015. Mitchell was also a member of the Legislative Black Caucus of Maryland. During his tenure, Mitchell supported the Civil Marriage Protection Act and introduced bills that would transfer control of Baltimore City Public Schools to the mayor of Baltimore.

In October 2013, Maryland Attorney General Doug Gansler said that he considered choosing Mitchell as his running mate in the 2014 Maryland gubernatorial election, in which he ran with state delegate Jolene Ivey. Mitchell declined to run, saying that he didn't want to put his children through a grueling statewide campaign.

During the 2010 redistricting cycle, the 44th district was split into two sub-districts; Mitchell was drawn into the single-member District 44A with incumbents Keith E. Haynes and Melvin L. Stukes. The three incumbents ran for re-election in this district in 2014. Haynes defeated Mitchell and Stukes in the Democratic primary election in June 2014, with Mitchell placing second with 39.4 percent of the vote. Following his defeat, Mitchell declined to apply to serve the remainder of William H. Cole IV's term on the Baltimore City Council.

=== Hogan administration ===
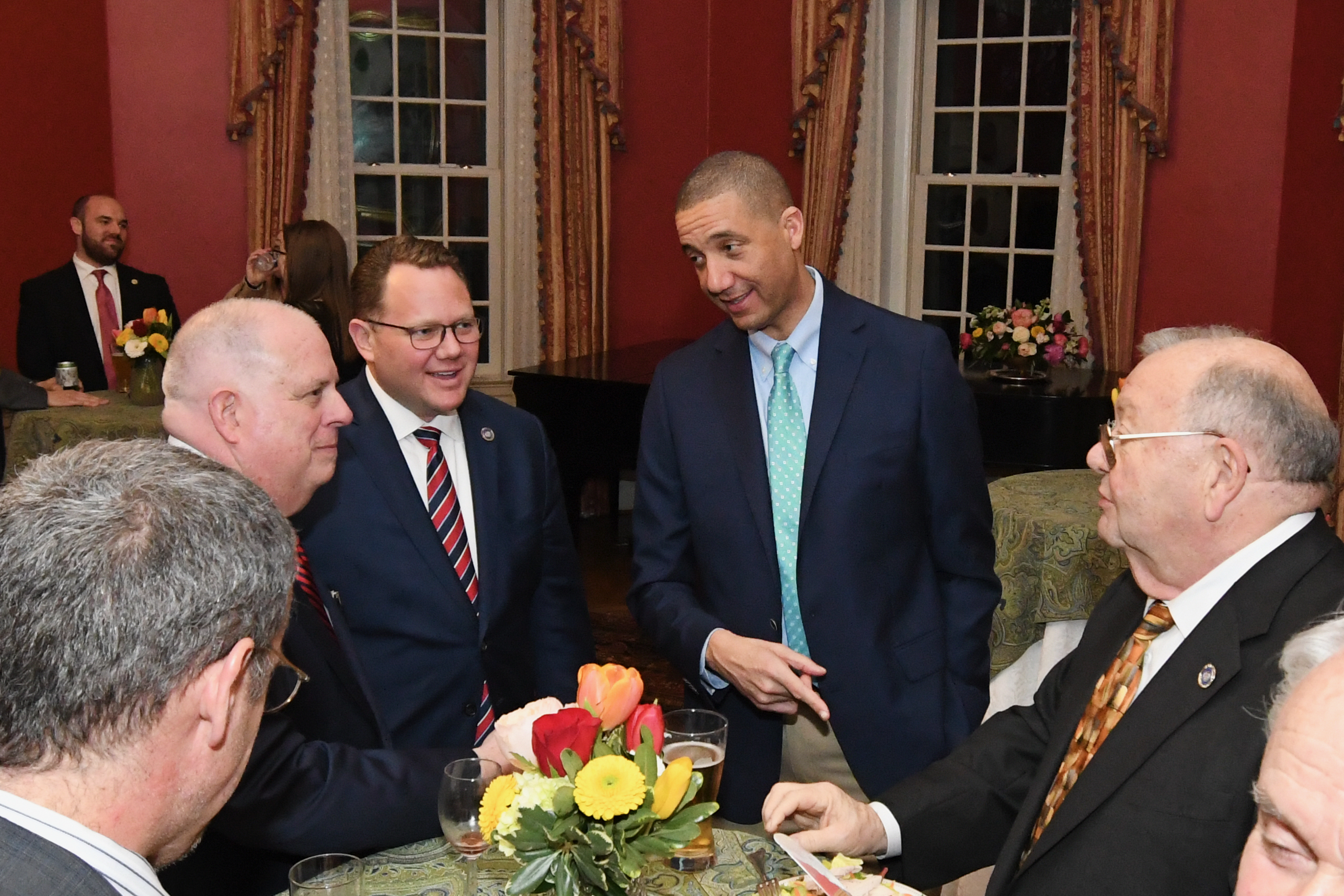
Mitchell and Governor Larry Hogan at a Republican caucus event, 2020

In January 2015, Governor-elect Larry Hogan named Mitchell as a special adviser to the governor. In this position, he oversaw some of Hogan's legislative initiatives, including proposals to expand access to charter and vocational schools, offer tax breaks to manufacturers who move to areas of the state with high unemployment, require large companies to provide paid sick leave, and increase criminal penalties for repeat violent offenders. He also served as Hogan's liaison to Baltimore and coordinated the state's response to the 2015 Baltimore protests.

In November 2019, Hogan appointed Mitchell to serve as his chief legislative officer, replacing Christopher B. Shank. During his tenure, he testified in support of Hogan's bills requiring Maryland public schools to start after Labor Day and to increase penalties for repeat violent offenders. In August 2020, following the resignation of Roy McGrath, Hogan named Mitchell as his acting chief of staff and appointed Mitchell to the University of Maryland Medical System's board of directors. He served as Hogan's acting chief of staff until October 2020, when Hogan named Amelia Chassé Alcivar as his new chief of staff.

Mitchell resigned as Hogan's chief legislative officer on June 14, 2022, to become a lobbyist with BGR Group.

== Personal life ==
Mitchell is married to Nicole Kramer, who taught Spanish at the Gilman School. Together, they have two children, a son and a daughter. He is a congregant at the Sharp Street Memorial United Methodist Church in Baltimore.

As a child, Mitchell was diagnosed with dyslexia.

== Electoral history ==
1995 Baltimore City Council 4th district Democratic primary election
Party	Candidate	Votes	%
Democratic	Agnes Welch (incumbent)	14,128	25.7
Democratic	Sheila Dixon (incumbent)	13,627	24.8
Democratic	Keiffer Mitchell Jr.	13,086	23.8
Democratic	Julian Thomas Jr.	3,726	6.8
Democratic	A. Robert Kaufman	2,229	4.0
Democratic	Tyrone Johnson	2,001	3.6
Democratic	Darius George Hall	1,897	3.4
Democratic	Charles Bagley Jr.	1,329	2.4
Democratic	Nancy Blackwell-Whyte	1,306	2.4
Democratic	Medgar Reid	900	1.6
Democratic	Gregory Truitt	812	1.5

1995 Baltimore City Council 4th district election
Party	Candidate	Votes	%
Democratic	Sheila Dixon (incumbent)	9,794	34.0
Democratic	Agnes Welch (incumbent)	9,619	33.4
Democratic	Keiffer Mitchell Jr.	9,386	32.6

1999 Baltimore City Council 4th district election
Party	Candidate	Votes	%
Democratic	Keiffer Mitchell Jr. (incumbent)	10,887	32.5
Democratic	Agnes Welch (incumbent)	10,036	30.0
Democratic	Catherine Pugh	8,937	26.7
Republican	Victor Clark Jr.	1,380	4.1
Republican	Jeffrey B. Smith Jr.	1,240	3.7
Republican	Joseph E. Ward	987	3.0

2004 Baltimore City Council 11th district election
Party	Candidate	Votes	%
Democratic	Keiffer Mitchell Jr. (incumbent)	12,450	89.8
Republican	Joseph E. Ward	1,416	10.2

2007 Baltimore mayoral Democratic primary election
Party	Candidate	Votes	%
Democratic	Sheila Dixon (incumbent)	54,381	63.1
Democratic	Keiffer Mitchell Jr.	20,376	23.7
Democratic	Andrey Bundley	6,543	7.6
Democratic	Jill P. Carter	2,372	2.8
Democratic	A. Robert Kaufman	885	1.0
Democratic	Mike Schaefer	762	0.9
Democratic	Frank M. Conaway Sr. (withdrawn)	533	0.6
Democratic	Phillip Brown	273	0.3

2010 Maryland House of Delegates District 44 Democratic primary election
Party	Candidate	Votes	%
Democratic	Keith E. Haynes (incumbent)	4,859	25.9
Democratic	Keiffer Mitchell Jr.	4,481	23.9
Democratic	Melvin L. Stukes (incumbent)	3,321	17.7
Democratic	Ruth M. Kirk (incumbent)	2,860	15.3
Democratic	Chris Blake	973	5.2
Democratic	Gary T. English	907	4.8
Democratic	Arlene B. Fisher	876	4.7
Democratic	Billy Taylor	462	2.5

2010 Maryland House of Delegates District 44 election
Party	Candidate	Votes	%
Democratic	Keiffer Mitchell Jr.	15,068	32.0
Democratic	Keith E. Haynes (incumbent)	14,879	31.6
Democratic	Melvin L. Stukes (incumbent)	13,994	29.7
Republican	Brian D. Jones	1,837	3.9
Republican	Trae Lewis	1,224	2.6
Write-in		100	0.2

2014 Maryland House of Delegates District 44A Democratic primary election
Party	Candidate	Votes	%
Democratic	Keith E. Haynes (incumbent)	1,734	43.4
Democratic	Keiffer Mitchell Jr. (incumbent)	1,574	39.4
Democratic	Melvin L. Stukes (incumbent)	691	17.3
