= 2010 Maryland Senate election =

- November 2, 2010

All 47 seats of the Maryland Senate 24 seats needed for a majority
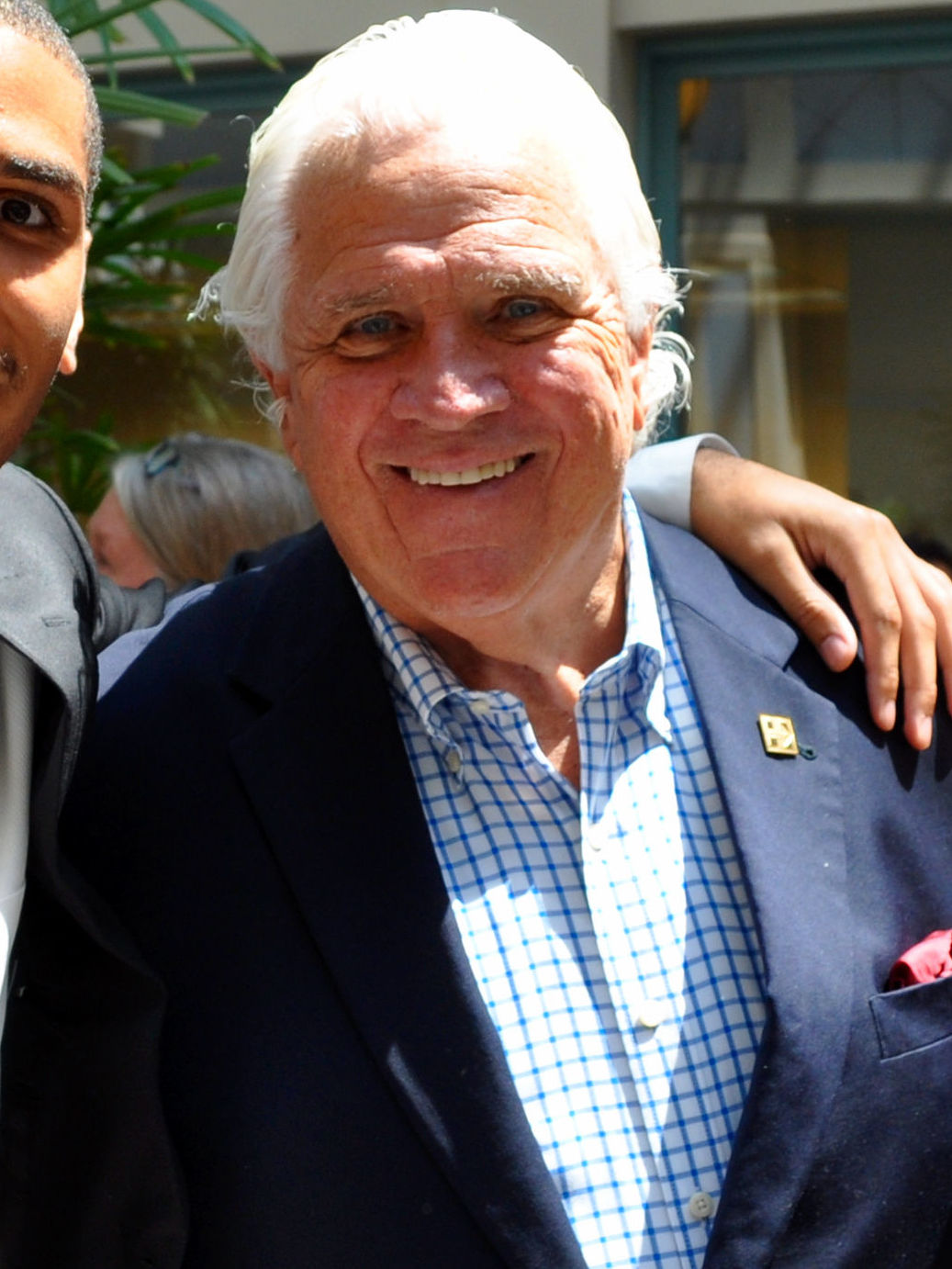

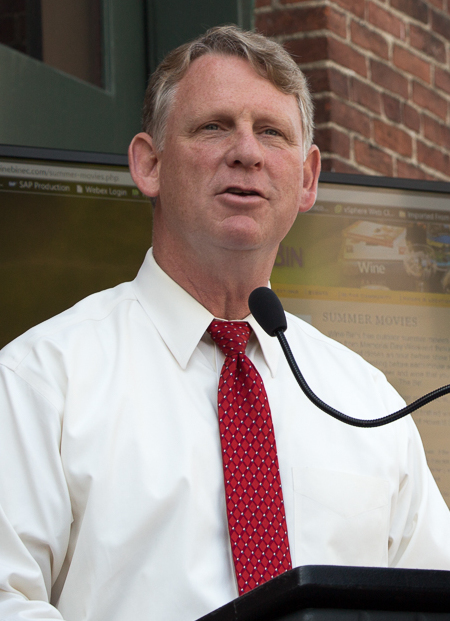
	Majority party	Minority party
Leader	Mike Miller	Allan Kittleman
Party	Democratic	Republican
Leader since	January 21, 1987	September 17, 2008
Leader's seat	27th district	9th district
Last election	33	14
Seats won	35	12
Seat change	▲2	▼2
- Democratic gain Democratic hold Republican hold Democratic: 50–60% 60-70% 70–80% >90% Republican: 50–60% 60–70% 70–80% >90%
President before election
Mike Miller
Democratic
President
Mike Miller
Democratic

The 2010 Maryland Senate election were held on November 2, 2010, to elect senators in all 47 districts of the Maryland Senate. Members were elected in single-member constituencies to four-year terms. These elections were held concurrently with various federal and state elections, including for Governor of Maryland.

== Summary ==
=== Closest races ===
Seats where the margin of victory was under 10%:

1. State Senate district 38, 1.38% (gain)
2. State Senate district 29, 2.30%
3. State Senate district 3, 2.35% (gain)
4. State Senate district 29, 2.93%

== Retiring incumbents ==
=== Republicans ===
1. District 5: Larry E. Haines retired.
2. District 7: Andy Harris retired to run for Congress in Maryland's 1st congressional district.
3. District 38: J. Lowell Stoltzfus retired.

== Incumbents defeated ==
=== In primary elections ===
==== Democrats ====
1. District 14: Rona E. Kramer lost renomination to Karen S. Montgomery.
2. District 19: Michael G. Lenett lost renomination to Roger Manno.
3. District 24: Nathaniel Exum lost renomination to Joanne C. Benson.
4. District 46: George W. Della Jr. lost renomination to Bill Ferguson.
5. District 47: David C. Harrington lost renomination to Victor R. Ramirez.

==== Republicans ====
1. District 2: Donald F. Munson lost renomination to Christopher B. Shank.

=== In the general election ===
==== Republicans ====
1. District 3: Alex Mooney lost to Ronald Young.

== Predictions ==
Source	Ranking	As of
Governing	Safe D	November 1, 2010

== Detailed results ==
=== District 1 ===
Maryland Senate District 1 election, 2010
Party	Candidate	Votes	%
Republican	George C. Edwards (incumbent)	30,012	99.3
Write-in		217	0.7
Republican hold			

=== District 2 ===
==== Republican primary ====
Maryland Senate District 2 Republican primary election, 2010
Party	Candidate	Votes	%
Republican	Christopher B. Shank	6,720	57.1
Republican	Donald F. Munson (incumbent)	5,059	42.9

==== General election ====
Maryland Senate District 2 election, 2010
Party	Candidate	Votes	%
Republican	Christopher B. Shank	21,319	70.9
Republican	Donald F. Munson (incumbent, write-in)	8,469	28.2
Write-in		283	0.9
Republican hold			

=== District 3 ===
==== Primary election ====
Maryland Senate District 3 Democratic primary election, 2010
Party	Candidate	Votes	%
Democratic	Ronald N. Young	4,892	66.0
Democratic	Don DeArmon	2,523	34.0

==== General election ====
Maryland Senate District 3 election, 2010
Party	Candidate	Votes	%
Democratic	Ronald N. Young	22,710	51.1
Republican	Alex Mooney (incumbent)	21,666	48.7
Write-in		75	0.2
Democratic gain from Republican			

=== District 4 ===
==== Republican primary ====
Maryland Senate District 4 Republican primary election, 2010
Party	Candidate	Votes	%
Republican	David R. Brinkley (incumbent)	9,705	79.0
Republican	Kathryn Freed	2,585	21.0

==== General election ====
Maryland Senate District 4 election, 2010
Party	Candidate	Votes	%
Republican	David R. Brinkley	31,522	72.8
Democratic	Sara Lou Trescott	11,733	27.1
Write-in		50	0.1
Republican hold			

=== District 5 ===
==== Republican primary ====
Maryland Senate District 5 Republican primary election, 2010
Party	Candidate	Votes	%
Republican	Joseph M. Getty	10,856	86.0
Republican	Dale Lusher	1,769	14.0

==== General election ====
Maryland Senate District 5 election, 2010
Party	Candidate	Votes	%
Republican	Joseph M. Getty	36,425	72.1
Democratic	C. Scott Stone	14,070	27.8
Write-in		60	0.1
Republican hold			

=== District 6 ===
==== Democratic primary ====
Maryland Senate District 6 Democratic primary election, 2010
Party	Candidate	Votes	%
Democratic	Norman R. Stone Jr. (incumbent)	5,336	53.8
Democratic	Jordan Hadfield	4,575	46.2

==== General election ====
Maryland Senate District 6 election, 2010
Party	Candidate	Votes	%
Democratic	Norman R. Stone, Jr. (incumbent)	17,623	57.8
Republican	Bruce D. Kahl	12,805	42.0
Write-in		49	0.2
Democratic hold			

=== District 7 ===
==== Republican primary ====
Maryland Senate District 7 Republican primary election, 2010
Party	Candidate	Votes	%
Republican	J. B. Jennings	5,547	61.0
Republican	Alfred W. Redmer Jr.	3,547	39.0

==== Democratic primary ====
Maryland Senate District 7 Democratic primary election, 2010
Party	Candidate	Votes	%
Democratic	Rebecca Weir Nelson	4,230	54.6
Democratic	Jim Stavropoulos Jr.	3,523	45.4

==== General election ====
Maryland Senate District 7 election, 2010
Party	Candidate	Votes	%
Republican	J. B. Jennings	28,890	65.9
Democratic	Rebecca Weir Nelson	14,848	33.9
Write-in		117	0.2
Republican hold			

=== District 8 ===
==== Republican primary ====
Maryland Senate District 8 Republican primary election, 2010
Party	Candidate	Votes	%
Republican	Dee Hodges	4,155	71.8
Republican	Benjamin Lawless	1,633	28.2

==== General election ====
Maryland Senate District 8 Democratic primary election, 2010
Party	Candidate	Votes	%
Democratic	Kathy Klausmeier (incumbent)	25,155	59.7
Republican	Dee Hodges	16,968	40.2
Write-in		41	0.1
Democratic hold			

=== District 9 ===
Maryland Senate District 9 election, 2010
Party	Candidate	Votes	%
Republican	Allan H. Kittleman (incumbent)	36,641	66.7
Democratic	Jim Adams	18,198	33.1
Write-in		60	0.1
Republican hold			

=== District 10 ===
==== Democratic primary ====
Maryland Senate District 10 Democratic primary election, 2010
Party	Candidate	Votes	%
Democratic	Delores G. Kelley (incumbent)	10,472	67.4
Democratic	Pat Kelly	2,945	19.0
Democratic	Stephanie Boston	2,110	13.6

==== General election ====
Maryland Senate District 10 election, 2010
Party	Candidate	Votes	%
Democratic	Delores G. Kelley (incumbent)	37,327	98.2
Write-in		691	1.8
Democratic hold			

=== District 11 ===
Maryland Senate District 11 election, 2010
Party	Candidate	Votes	%
Democratic	Robert Zirkin (incumbent)	38,730	98.4
Write-in		644	1.6
Democratic hold			

=== District 12 ===
Maryland Senate District 12 election, 2010
Party	Candidate	Votes	%
Democratic	Edward J. Kasemeyer (incumbent)	24,981	58.7
Republican	Rick Martel	17,568	41.3
Write-in		33	0.1
Democratic hold			

=== District 13 ===
==== Republican primary ====
Maryland Senate District 13 Republican primary election, 2010
Party	Candidate	Votes	%
Republican	Kyle Lorton	2,948	58.6
Republican	Jody Venkatesan	2,081	41.4

==== General election ====
Maryland Senate District 13 election, 2010
Party	Candidate	Votes	%
Democratic	James N. Robey (incumbent)	28,258	63.0
Republican	Kyle Lorton	16,503	36.8
Write-in		62	0.1
Democratic hold			

=== District 14 ===
==== Democratic primary ====
Maryland Senate District 14 Democratic primary election, 2010
Party	Candidate	Votes	%
Democratic	Karen S. Montgomery	4,973	50.6
Democratic	Rona E. Kramer (incumbent)	4,857	49.4

==== General election ====
Maryland Senate District 14 election, 2010
Party	Candidate	Votes	%
Democratic	Karen S. Montgomery	24,422	62.0
Republican	Eric J. Cary	14,898	37.8
Write-in		66	0.2
Democratic hold			

=== District 15 ===
Maryland Senate District 15 election, 2010
Party	Candidate	Votes	%
Democratic	Rob Garagiola (incumbent)	25,648	63.7
Republican	Dwight Patel	14,570	36.2
Write-in		45	0.1
Democratic hold			

=== District 16 ===
Maryland Senate District 16 election, 2010
Party	Candidate	Votes	%
Democratic	Brian Frosh (incumbent)	30,762	70.5
Republican	Jerry Cave	12,815	29.4
Write-in		39	0.1
Democratic hold			

=== District 17 ===
==== Democratic primary ====
Maryland Senate District 17 Democratic primary election, 2010
Party	Candidate	Votes	%
Democratic	Jennie M. Forehand (incumbent)	4,129	52.3
Democratic	Cheryl Kagan	3,773	47.7

==== General election ====
Maryland Senate District 17 election, 2010
Party	Candidate	Votes	%
Democratic	Jennie M. Forehand (incumbent)	23,508	73.1
Republican	Adol Theo Owen-Williams II	8,535	26.5
Write-in		119	0.4
Democratic hold			

=== District 18 ===
==== Democratic primary ====
Maryland Senate District 18 Democratic primary election, 2010
Party	Candidate	Votes	%
Democratic	Richard Madaleno (incumbent)	8,734	78.7
Democratic	Michael C. Griffiths	2,364	21.3

==== General election ====
Maryland Senate District 18 election, 2010
Party	Candidate	Votes	%
Democratic	Richard Madaleno (incumbent)	26,077	74.8
Republican	Kurt Osuch	8,755	25.1
Write-in		44	0.1
Democratic hold			

=== District 19 ===
==== Democratic primary ====
Maryland Senate District 19 Democratic primary election, 2010
Party	Candidate	Votes	%
Democratic	Roger Manno	5,892	54.0
Democratic	Michael G. Lenett (incumbent)	5,020	46.0

==== General election ====
Maryland Senate District 19 election, 2010
Party	Candidate	Votes	%
Democratic	Roger Manno	24,249	68.0
Republican	Don Irvine	11,320	31.8
Write-in		78	0.2
Democratic hold			

=== District 20 ===
Maryland Senate District 20 election, 2010
Party	Candidate	Votes	%
Democratic	Jamie Raskin (incumbent)	25,384	98.9
Write-in		276	1.1
Democratic hold			

=== District 21 ===
Maryland Senate District 21 election, 2010
Party	Candidate	Votes	%
Democratic	James Rosapepe (incumbent)	23,331	98.7
Write-in		302	1.3
Democratic hold			

=== District 22 ===
Maryland Senate District 22 election, 2010
Party	Candidate	Votes	%
Democratic	Paul G. Pinsky (incumbent)	20,731	99.4
Write-in		122	0.6
Democratic hold			

=== District 23 ===
==== Democratic primary ====
Maryland Senate District 23 Democratic primary election, 2010
Party	Candidate	Votes	%
Democratic	Douglas J. J. Peters (incumbent)	10,284	60.1
Democratic	Bobby G. Henry Jr.	5,121	30.0
Democratic	Darrell Carrington	968	5.7
Democratic	Mike Anderson	725	4.2

==== General election ====
Maryland Senate District 23 election, 2010
Party	Candidate	Votes	%
Democratic	Douglas J. J. Peters (incumbent)	39,260	99.4
Write-in		240	0.6
Democratic hold			

=== District 24 ===
==== Democratic primary ====
Maryland Senate District 24 Democratic primary election, 2010
Party	Candidate	Votes	%
Democratic	Joanne C. Benson	6,178	53.8
Democratic	Nathaniel Exum (incumbent)	5,311	46.2

==== General election ====
Maryland Senate District 24 election, 2010
Party	Candidate	Votes	%
Democratic	Joanne C. Benson	27,222	99.7
Write-in		92	0.3
Democratic hold			

=== District 25 ===
Maryland Senate District 25 election, 2010
Party	Candidate	Votes	%
Democratic	Ulysses Currie (incumbent)	31,189	98.6
Write-in		451	1.4
Democratic hold			

=== District 26 ===
==== Democratic primary ====
Maryland Senate District 26 Democratic primary election, 2010
Party	Candidate	Votes	%
Democratic	C. Anthony Muse (incumbent)	11,529	81.4
Democratic	Albert Chatmon	2,642	18.6

==== General election ====
Maryland Senate District 26 election, 2010
Party	Candidate	Votes	%
Democratic	C. Anthony Muse (incumbent)	30,492	99.5
Write-in		167	0.5
Democratic hold			

=== District 27 ===
Maryland Senate District 27 election, 2010
Party	Candidate	Votes	%
Democratic	Thomas V. Miller Jr. (incumbent)	36,286	74.9
Republican	Vernon R. Hayes, Jr.	12,143	25.0
Write-in		49	0.1
Democratic hold			

=== District 28 ===
Maryland Senate District 28 election, 2010
Party	Candidate	Votes	%
Democratic	Thomas M. Middleton (incumbent)	31,377	70.2
Republican	Jay Bala	13,290	29.7
Write-in		34	0.1
Democratic hold			

=== District 29 ===
Maryland Senate District 29 election, 2010
Party	Candidate	Votes	%
Democratic	Roy Dyson (incumbent)	22,368	51.4
Republican	Stephen Waugh	21,090	48.5
Write-in		28	0.1
Democratic hold			

=== District 30 ===
Maryland Senate District 30 election, 2010
Party	Candidate	Votes	%
Democratic	John Astle (incumbent)	25,285	51.1
Republican	Ron Elfenbein	24,146	48.8
Write-in		42	0.1
Democratic hold			

=== District 31 ===
==== Republican primary ====
Maryland Senate District 31 Republican primary election, 2010
Party	Candidate	Votes	%
Republican	Bryan Simonaire (incumbent)	6,693	83.5
Republican	William Thomas Capps Jr.	1,323	16.5

==== Democratic primary ====
Maryland Senate District 31 Democratic primary election, 2010
Party	Candidate	Votes	%
Democratic	Ned Carey	4,790	69.2
Democratic	John Edward Booze	2,131	30.8

==== General election ====
Maryland Senate District 31 election, 2010
Party	Candidate	Votes	%
Republican	Bryan Simonaire (incumbent)	25,744	62.1
Democratic	Ned Carey	15,688	37.8
Write-in		35	0.1
Republican hold			

=== District 32 ===
Maryland Senate District 32 election, 2010
Party	Candidate	Votes	%
Democratic	James E. DeGrange Sr. (incumbent)	24,831	60.4
Republican	Larry Barber	16,223	39.5
Write-in		47	0.1
Democratic hold			

=== District 33 ===
==== Republican primary ====
Maryland Senate District 33 Republican primary election, 2010
Party	Candidate	Votes	%
Republican	Edward R. Reilly (incumbent)	6,838	51.9
Republican	James J. King	5,458	41.4
Republican	Brian Benjers	886	6.7

==== General election ====
Maryland Senate District 33 election, 2010
Party	Candidate	Votes	%
Republican	Edward R. Reilly (incumbent)	43,500	98.3
Write-in		763	1.7
Republican hold			

=== District 34 ===
==== Democratic primary ====
Maryland Senate District 34 Democratic primary election, 2010
Party	Candidate	Votes	%
Democratic	Arthur Henry Helton, Jr.	4,811	65.2
Democratic	Rovall M. Washington	2,568	34.8

==== General election ====
Maryland Senate District 34 election, 2010
Party	Candidate	Votes	%
Republican	Nancy Jacobs (incumbent)	22,358	55.9
Democratic	Arthur Henry Helton, Jr.	17,540	43.9
Write-in		79	0.2
Republican hold			

=== District 35 ===
Maryland Senate District 35 election, 2010
Party	Candidate	Votes	%
Republican	Barry Glassman (incumbent)	46,209	99.1
Write-in		439	0.9
Republican hold			

=== District 36 ===
==== Republican primary ====
Maryland Senate District 36 Republican primary election, 2010
Party	Candidate	Votes	%
Republican	E. J. Pipkin (incumbent)	8,365	71.9
Republican	Donald Alcorn	3,264	28.1

==== Democratic primary ====
Maryland Senate District 36 Democratic primary election, 2010
Party	Candidate	Votes	%
Democratic	Steven A. Mumford	4,041	53.0
Democratic	Robert J. Alt	3,589	47.0

==== General election ====
Maryland Senate District 36 election, 2010
Party	Candidate	Votes	%
Republican	E. J. Pipkin (incumbent)	29,238	63.2
Democratic	Steven A. Mumford	16,896	36.5
Write-in		95	0.2
Republican hold			

=== District 37 ===
==== Republican primary ====
Maryland Senate District 37 Republican primary election, 2010
Party	Candidate	Votes	%
Republican	Richard F. Colburn (incumbent)	7,957	76.6
Republican	Paul Galanek	2,427	23.4

==== Democratic primary ====
Maryland Senate District 37 Democratic primary election, 2010
Party	Candidate	Votes	%
Democratic	Chris Robinson	4,381	51.3
Democratic	Tim Quinn	2,605	30.5
Democratic	Christopher N. Jakubiak	1,558	18.2

==== General election ====
Maryland Senate District 37 election, 2010
Party	Candidate	Votes	%
Republican	Richard F. Colburn (incumbent)	26,365	59.2
Democratic	Chris Robinson	18,164	40.8
Write-in		41	0.1
Republican hold			

=== District 38 ===
==== Democratic primary ====
Maryland Senate District 38 Democratic primary election, 2010
Party	Candidate	Votes	%
Democratic	James N. Mathias Jr.	7,891	85.8
Democratic	Charles Mickey Lehrer	1,308	14.2

==== General election ====
Maryland Senate District 38 election, 2010
Party	Candidate	Votes	%
Democratic	James N. Mathias Jr.	23,559	50.7
Republican	Michael James	22,919	49.3
Write-in		26	0.0
Democratic gain from Republican			

=== District 39 ===
==== Democratic primary ====
Maryland Senate District 39 Democratic primary election, 2010
Party	Candidate	Votes	%
Democratic	Nancy J. King (incumbent)	3,695	51.7
Democratic	Saqib Ali	3,447	48.3

==== General election ====
Maryland Senate District 39 election, 2010
Party	Candidate	Votes	%
Democratic	Nancy J. King (incumbent)	17,990	64.6
Republican	Robert J. Smith	9,724	34.9
Write-in		138	0.5
Democratic hold			

=== District 40 ===
Maryland Senate District 40 election, 2010
Party	Candidate	Votes	%
Democratic	Catherine Pugh (incumbent)	21,778	99.3
Write-in		148	0.7
Democratic hold			

=== District 41 ===
Maryland Senate District 41 election, 2010
Party	Candidate	Votes	%
Democratic	Lisa Gladden (incumbent)	28,620	99.2
Write-in		231	0.8
Democratic hold			

=== District 42 ===
==== Republican primary ====
Maryland Senate District 42 Republican primary election, 2010
Party	Candidate	Votes	%
Republican	Kevin Carney	4,843	87.3
Republican	Walter T. Kuebler	704	12.7

==== General election ====
Maryland Senate District 42 election, 2010
Party	Candidate	Votes	%
Democratic	James Brochin (incumbent)	24,346	58.4
Republican	Kevin Carney	17,320	41.5
Write-in		27	0.1
Democratic hold			

=== District 43 ===
==== Democratic primary ====
Maryland Senate District 43 Democratic primary election, 2010
Party	Candidate	Votes	%
Democratic	Joan Carter Conway (incumbent)	9,259	69.5
Democratic	Hector L. Torres	4,070	30.5

==== General election ====
Maryland Senate District 43 election, 2010
Party	Candidate	Votes	%
Democratic	Joan Carter Conway (incumbent)	27,583	99.0
Write-in		276	1.0
Democratic hold			

=== District 44 ===
Maryland Senate District 44 election, 2010
Party	Candidate	Votes	%
Democratic	Verna L. Jones (incumbent)	17,706	91.2
Republican	Bernard Joseph Reiter	1,669	8.6
Write-in		31	0.2
Democratic hold			

=== District 45 ===
Maryland Senate District 45 election, 2010
Party	Candidate	Votes	%
Democratic	Nathaniel J. McFadden (incumbent)	23,159	99.3
Write-in		166	0.7
Democratic hold			

=== District 46 ===
==== Democratic primary ====
Maryland Senate District 46 Democratic primary election, 2010
Party	Candidate	Votes	%
Democratic	Bill Ferguson	5,248	59.0
Democratic	George W. Della Jr. (incumbent)	3,641	41.0

==== General election ====
Maryland Senate District 46 election, 2010
Party	Candidate	Votes	%
Democratic	Bill Ferguson	19,126	97.9
Write-in		412	2.1
Democratic hold			

=== District 47 ===
==== Democratic primary ====
Maryland Senate District 47 Democratic primary election, 2010
Party	Candidate	Votes	%
Democratic	Victor R. Ramirez	4,532	63.6
Democratic	David C. Harrington (incumbent)	2,596	36.4

==== General election ====
Maryland Senate District 47 election, 2010
Party	Candidate	Votes	%
Democratic	Victor R. Ramirez	15,548	98.9
Write-in		169	1.1
Democratic hold			

== See also ==
- Elections in Maryland
- 2010 United States elections
- 2010 Maryland gubernatorial election
- 2010 Maryland Attorney General election
- 2010 United States Senate election in Maryland
- 2010 Maryland Comptroller election
- 2010 United States House of Representatives elections in Maryland
- 2010 United States gubernatorial elections
- 2010 Maryland House of Delegates election
