= Keith E. Haynes =

American politician (born 1963)

Member of the Maryland House of Delegates from the 44A district
- In office January 8, 2003 – July 15, 2021
- Succeeded by: Roxane L. Prettyman

Personal details
- Born: February 15, 1963 (age 63) Shelby, North Carolina, U.S.
- Party: Democratic
- Occupation: Lawyer

Keith E. Haynes (born February 15, 1963) is a former American politician and lawyer. Haynes was first elected to the Maryland House of Delegates in 2002 and re-elected in 2006. He represents the 44th Legislative District (Baltimore) in the Maryland House of Delegates. As a lawyer, Haynes was a Senior Attorney with the Law of Offices of Peter G. Angelos, P.C. and practiced in Maryland and the District of Columbia in the practice areas of Products Liability, Asbestos Litigation, Toxic Torts and General Civil Litigation. In June 2021, Haynes announced that he was retiring from the Maryland General Assembly.

== Background ==
Haynes was born in Shelby, North Carolina. He attended North Carolina State University, where he earned a Bachelor of Arts degree in political science with a concentration in law and political philosophy. At North Carolina Central University, he earned a Master of Public Administration (cum laude). He then graduated from the University of Baltimore School of Law with a Juris Doctor Degree J.D. He has been admitted and is a current member of the Maryland Bar and the District of Columbia Bar. Haynes has also been admitted to practice before the United States District Court for the District of Maryland; the United States Court of Appeals for the Fourth Circuit; and the United States Supreme Court. As a practicing attorney, he is a member of the American Bar Association; the National Bar Association; the Federal Bar Association; the Maryland State Bar Association; the Bar Association of Baltimore City; the Monumental Bar Association; the Maryland Trial Lawyers' Association and the American Trial Lawyers' Association.

== In the Legislature ==
Delegate Haynes was a member of the House of Delegates from January 8, 2003 to December 2021. He was chosen by Speaker Mike Busch to be a Deputy Majority Whip in 2006. He was a member of the House Appropriations Committee where he served as Vice-Chair of the Health and Human Resources Subcommittee. As a member of the House Appropriations Committee, Haynes also served on the Capital Budget Subcommittee; Oversight Committee on Pensions; Juvenile Services Facilities Work Group; and the Oversight Committee on Personnel (2004–2006). In addition to serving on the Appropriations Committee, Haynes wasy a member of the Joint Committee on Administrative, Executive and Legislative Review (AELR); Joint Audit Committee and the Special Joint Committee on Pensions. He served as the Vice Chairman of the Baltimore City Delegation and is the former Vice President of the Legislative Black Caucus of Maryland Foundation (2004–2006) and a member of the Legislative Black Caucus of Maryland.

=== Legislative notes ===
- Co-sponsored HB 860 (Baltimore City Public Schools Construction and Revitalization Act of 2013). Signed by the Governor on May 16, 2013, the new law approved 1.1 billion dollars to construct new schools in Baltimore City.
- voted for the Clean Indoor Air Act of 2007 (HB359)
- voted in favor of prohibiting ground rents in 2007(SB106)
- voted for slots in 2005 (HB1361)
- voted in favor of increasing the sales tax by 20% - Tax Reform Act of 2007(HB2)
- voted in favor of prohibiting ground rents in 2007(SB106)
- voted in favor of in-state tuition for illegal immigrants in 2007 (HB6)
- voted in favor of slots (HB4) in the 2007 Special session

=== Democratic primary election results, 2010 ===
- 2010 Race for Maryland House of Delegates – 44th District

Voters to choose three: (only the top 6 finishers are shown)

| Name | Votes | Percent | Outcome |
|---|---|---|---|
| Keith E. Haynes | 4859 | 25.9% | Won |
| Keiffer J. Mitchell, Jr. | 4481 | 13.9% | Won |
| Melvin L. Stukes | 3321 | 17.7% | Won |
| Ruth M. Kirk | 2860 | 15.2% | Lost |
| Chris Blake | 973 | 5.1% | Lost |
| Gary T. English | 907 | 4.8% | Lost |

=== General election results, 2006 ===
2006 Race for Maryland House of Delegates – 44th District

Voters to choose three:

| Name | Votes | Percent | Outcome |
|---|---|---|---|
| Melvin L. Stukes Dem. | 13,173 | 34.0% | Won |
| Ruth M. Kirk, Dem. | 12,894 | 33.3% | Won |
| Keith E. Haynes, Dem. | 12,565 | 32.4% | Won |
| Other Write-Ins | 129 | 0.3% | |
