= Oz Bengur =

American politician

Osman "Oz" Bengur (born February 23, 1949) is an American investment banker and Democratic politician. Bengur served as Treasurer for the Maryland Democratic Party and was a candidate for Congress in 2002 and 2006. Bengur was the first American of Turkish descent to run for Congress in the United States.

== Early life and education ==
Bengur was born in 1949 and raised in Montgomery County, Maryland. Bengur received a bachelor's degree from Princeton University, and went on to receive a criminology degree from Cambridge University.

== Career ==
=== Private sector ===
In 1991, Bengur co-founded Bengur Bryan & Co., an investment banking firm specializing in financing and mergers and acquisitions. He is also Chairman of PJPA, LLC, a large Papa John's franchisee operating stores in Delaware and New Jersey.

At age 30, he worked as an aide to Maine Governor Joseph E. Brennan. Bengur was later named Deputy Director of the Maine Office of Energy Resources. Bengur was an Alternate Delegate from Maine to the 1980 Democratic National Convention.

=== Political activity ===
Bengur was a candidate in the Democratic primary for the United States House of Representatives in Maryland's 2nd district in 2002. He spent $50,000 of his own money in the race, losing to Dutch Ruppersberger. In 2006, he sought the Democratic nomination for Congress in the 3rd district, but lost to John Sarbanes. He was also a 2010 candidate for Delegate in Maryland's 42nd District.

== See also ==
- Maryland congressional elections, 2006
