= Melvin L. Stukes =

American politician (1948–2024)

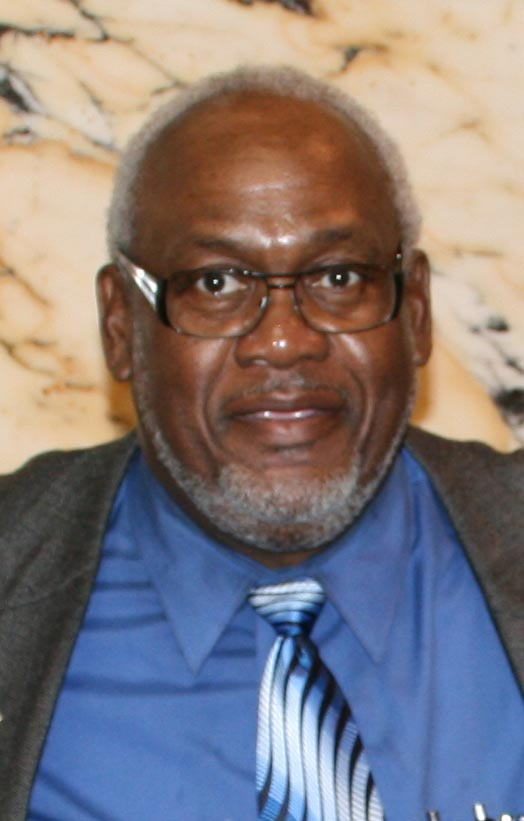
- Stukes in 2011

Member of the Maryland House of Delegates from the 44th district
- In office January 10, 2007 – January 14, 2015
- Preceded by: Jeffrey Paige
- Succeeded by: Keith E. Haynes

Member of the Baltimore City Council from the 6th district
- In office 1991–2004
- Preceded by: Ed Reisienger
- Succeeded by: Helen Holton

Personal details
- Born: March 15, 1948 Baltimore, Maryland, U.S.
- Died: September 21, 2024 (aged 76) Pikesville, Maryland, U.S.
- Party: Democratic
- Spouse: Catherine DeFord (m. 2022)
- Children: 2
- Occupation: Administrator

Melvin L. Stukes (March 15, 1948 – September 21, 2024) was an American politician who represented the 44th legislative district in the Maryland House of Delegates. Stukes was a member of the House Ways and Means Committee and the Legislative Black Caucus of Maryland. Prior to winning a seat in the Maryland General Assembly, Stukes served 13 years in the Baltimore City Council.

== Background ==
Delegate Stukes was born in Baltimore, his father was in the Navy and the family moved several times during his childhood. He graduated from Scott's Branch High school in Summerton, South Carolina. After high school he enlisted in U.S. Air Force, served three years until 1968 and later entered Morgan State University, where he earned a B.S. in business administration in 1975. During his stint on the Baltimore City Council, Stukes made national news by introducing a resolution that would ban the word nigger. Stukes said he was prompted to introduce the measure, not because of racism, but because it was being used widely by members of his own race. Stukes said that by ignoring the use of the word, officials give the impression, especially to young people, that it is acceptable.

== In the Legislature ==
When Stukes joined the Maryland house of delegates in 2007 he was immediately assigned to the ways and means committee, he was also a member of the Baltimore City Delegation and the Legislative Black Caucus of Maryland Due to redistricting, District 44 was divided into 44A and 44B, which resulted in three incumbent delegates, including Stukes, having to run for the same district seat. Stukes came in third.

Stukes had two daughters. He married his partner of sixteen years, Catherine DeFord, in 2022. Stukes died in Pikesville, Maryland, on September 21, 2024, at the age of 76.

=== Democratic primary election results, 2014 ===
- 2014 Race for Maryland House of Delegates – District 44A

Voters to choose one:

Name	Votes	Percent	Outcome
Keith E. Haynes	1734	43.4%	Won
Keiffer J. Mitchell, Jr.	1574	39.4%	Lost
Melvin L. Stukes	523	17.3%	Lost

=== Democratic primary election results, 2010 ===
- 2010 Race for Maryland House of Delegates – 44th District

Voters to choose three: (only the top 6 finishers are shown)

Name	Votes	Percent	Outcome
Keith E. Haynes	4859	25.9%	Won
Keiffer J. Mitchell, Jr.	4481	13.9%	Won
Melvin L. Stukes	3321	17.7%	Won
Ruth M. Kirk	2860	15.2%	Lost
Chris Blake	973	5.1%	Lost
Gary T. English	907	4.8%	Lost

=== General election results, 2006 ===
- 2006 Race for Maryland House of Delegates – 44th District

Voters to choose three:

Name	Votes	Percent	Outcome
Melvin L. Stukes Dem.	13,173	34.0%	Won
Ruth M. Kirk, Dem.	12,894	33.3%	Won
Keith E. Haynes, Dem.	12,565	32.4%	Won
Other Write-Ins	129	0.3%	

=== Legislative notes ===
- Co-sponsored HB 860 (Baltimore City Public Schools Construction and Revitalization Act of 2013). Signed by the Governor on May 16, 2013, the new law approved 1.1 billion dollars to construct new schools in Baltimore City.
- voted for the Clean Indoor Air Act of 2007 (HB359)
- voted for the Tax Reform Act of 2007(HB2)
- voted in favor of prohibiting ground rents in 2007(SB106)
- sponsored House Bill 30 in 2007, allowing the state to confiscate unused portions of gift certificates after 4 years.
