= Ruth M. Kirk =

American politician (1930–2011)

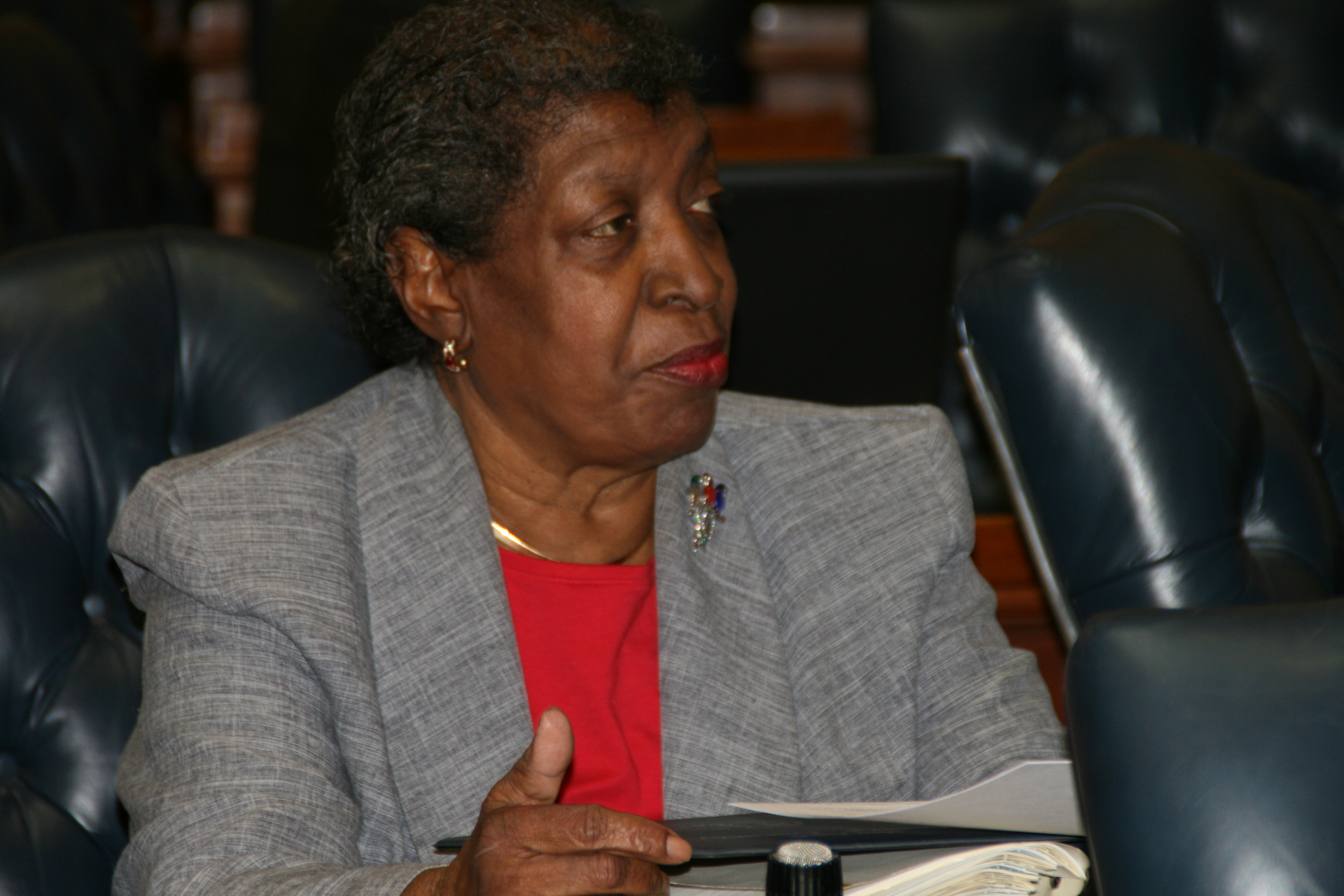

Member of the Maryland House of Delegates from the 44th district
- In office January 1995 – January 2011
- Succeeded by: Keiffer J. Mitchell, Jr.
- Constituency: Baltimore City

Maryland House of Delegates (39th District)
- In office 1983–1995
- Succeeded by: (redistricting)

Personal details
- Born: February 2, 1930 Baltimore, Maryland, U.S.
- Died: June 17, 2011 (aged 81)
- Party: Democratic
- Spouse: Arthur F. Kirk II
- Children: Six children

Ruth M. Kirk (February 2, 1930 – June 17, 2011) was an American politician who represented the 44th legislative district in the Maryland House of Delegates. She was elected 7 times and served a total of 28 years representing west and west central Baltimore.

== Background ==
Born Ruth Simmons in Baltimore, Delegate Kirk was the fifth of eight children. She attended Baltimore City public schools through the ninth grade and later received a GED. Prior to being elected to the Maryland House of Delegates, Kirk held jobs as a house cleaner and in early childhood education. In 1970, Kirk took a job at Paul Laurence Dunbar High School (Baltimore, Maryland), working as a teacher's aide.

== In the Legislature ==
Kirk was first elected in 1982 and sworn in as a member of the House of Delegates on January 12, 1983. She was appointed to the Constitutional and Administrative Law Committee and served on it until its elimination in 1990. She was then appointed to the Economic Matters Committee where she served until 2011. There, she served on its deathcare industry work group; workers' compensation subcommittee, 1995–2003; real estate & housing subcommittee, 1999–2003; business regulation subcommittee, 2003–11; property & casualty insurance subcommittee, 2003–06). During her career in the legislature, Kirk also served as a member of the Tort and Insurance Reform Oversight Committee, 1993; the House Facilities Committee, 1993–2011; the Joint Committee on Federal Relations, 1999–2004; the Protocol Committee, 2007–11, the Liaison Work Group of the Baltimore City Delegation, the Legislative Black Caucus of Maryland (formerly Maryland Black Caucus), 1983-2011 (member, nominating committee, 2000–11, redistricting committee, 2000–11; past chair, budget committee; past treasurer), the Women Legislators of Maryland, 1983-2011 (president, 1994); the Maryland Veterans Caucus, 2006–11, and the National Black Caucus of State Legislators.

Outside of the legislature, she was a member of the National Order of Women Legislators and the Southern Legislative Conference (economic development, transportation & cultural affairs committee, 2005–11; fiscal affairs & government operations committee, 2005–11).

Delegates McCoy, Kirk, Anderson and Cummings during a floor session in the Maryland House in February 1984.

=== Legislative notes ===
- voted for the Clean Indoor Air Act of 2007 (HB359)
- voted for the Healthy Air Act in 2006 (SB154)
- voted for slots in 2005 (HB1361)
- voted for income tax reduction in 1998 (SB750)
- voted in favor of increasing the sales tax by 20% - Tax Reform Act of 2007(HB2)
- voted in favor of prohibiting ground rents in 2007(SB106)
- voted in favor of in-state tuition for illegal immigrants in 2007 (HB6)

=== Democratic primary election results, 2010 ===
- 2010 Race for Maryland House of Delegates – 44th District

Voters to choose three: (only the top 6 finishers are shown)

Name	Votes	Percent	Outcome
Keith E. Haynes	4859	25.9%	Won
Keiffer J. Mitchell, Jr.	4481	13.9%	Won
Melvin L. Stukes	3321	17.7%	Won
Ruth Kirk	2860	15.2%	Lost
Chris Blake	973	5.1%	Lost
Gary T. English	907	4.8%	Lost

=== General election results, 2006 ===
- 2006 Race for Maryland House of Delegates – 44th District

Voters to choose three:

Name	Votes	Percent	Outcome
Melvin L. Stukes Dem.	13,173	34.0%	Won
Ruth M. Kirk, Dem.	12,894	33.3%	Won
Keith E. Haynes, Dem.	12,565	32.4%	Won
Other Write-Ins	129	0.3%	

== Death and legacy ==
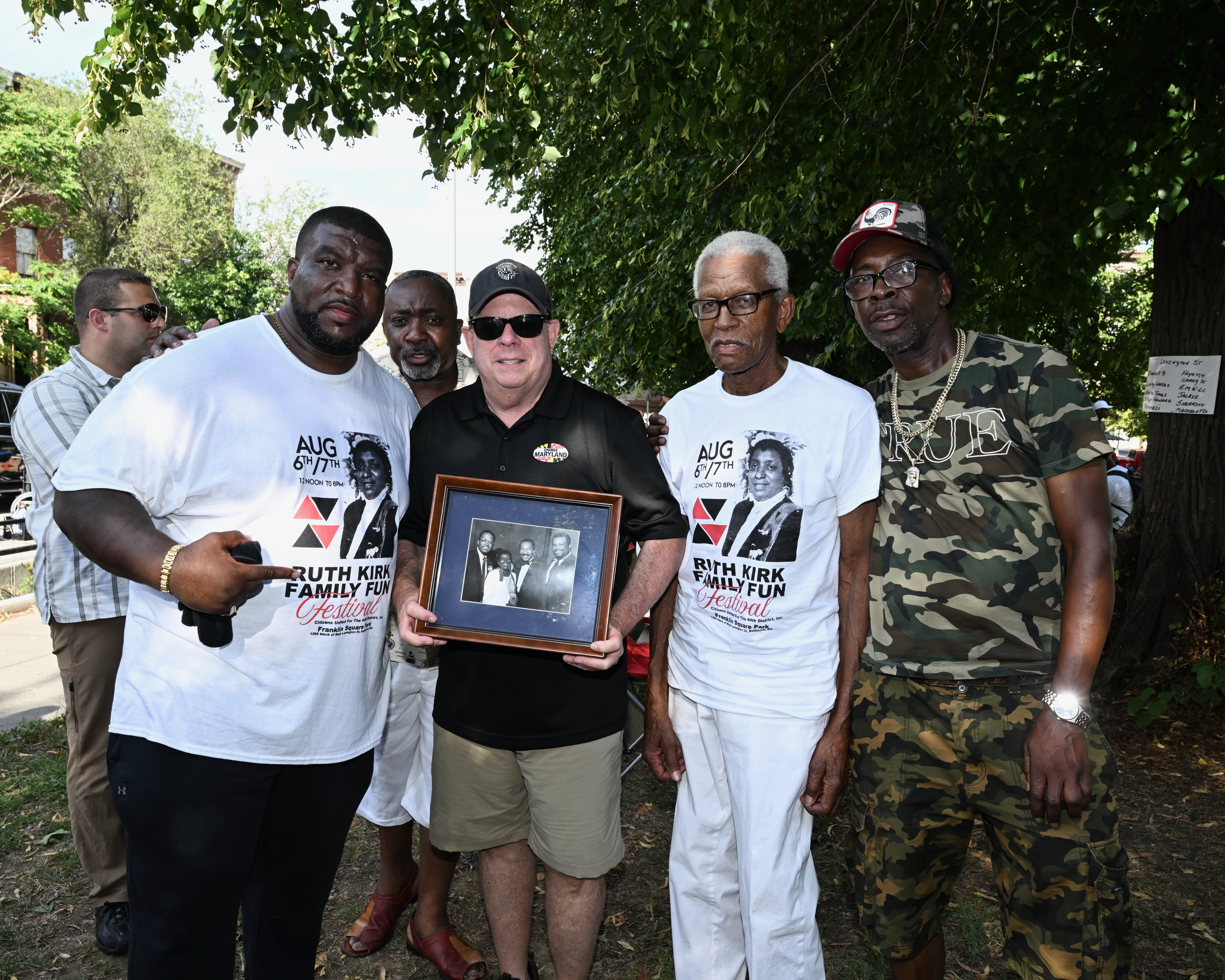
Governor Larry Hogan at the Ruth Kirk Community Centre in August 2022

She died in 2011. Her son, Art Kirk, created a recreation center in her honor called the Ruth M. Kirk Recreation and Learning Center and Community Garden.
