= 2010 Maryland Attorney General election =

- November 2, 2010
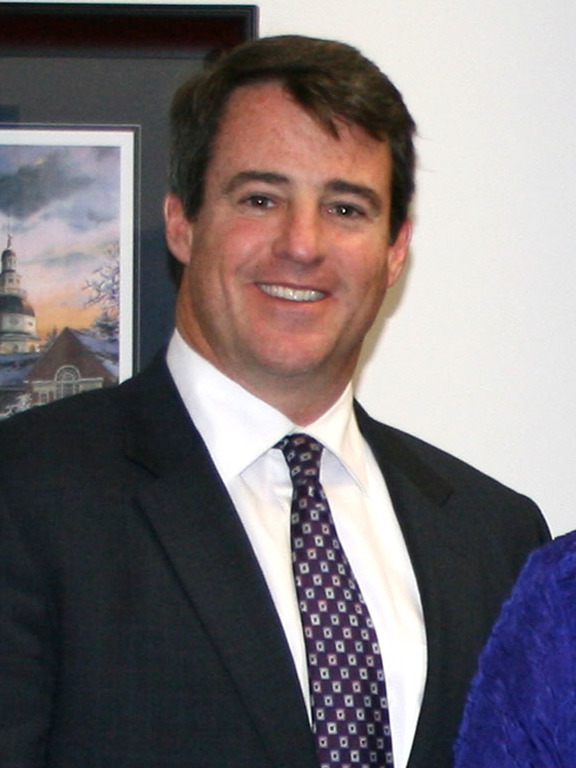
Nominee	Doug Gansler
Party	Democratic
Popular vote	1,349,962
Percentage	98.2%
- County results Gansler: 90–100%
Attorney General before election
Doug Gansler
Democratic
Elected Attorney General
Doug Gansler
Democratic

The Maryland Attorney General election of 2010 was held on November 2, 2010. Incumbent attorney general Douglas Gansler encountered no official candidates in his bid for a second term.

As of 2022, this was the last time Garrett County voted Democratic in any statewide election.

== Candidates ==
=== Democratic Party ===
- Doug Gansler, incumbent Attorney General of Maryland

== Primary election ==
Democratic Primary results
Party	Candidate	Votes	%
Democratic	Doug Gansler (incumbent)	376,483	100.00
Total votes		376,483	100.00

== General election ==
Maryland Attorney General election, 2010
Party	Candidate	Votes	%	±%
Democratic	Doug Gansler (incumbent)	1,349,962	98.18%	+37.19%
Write-in		25,033	1.82%	
Majority		1,324,929	96.36%	+74.26%
Turnout		1,374,995		
Democratic hold		Swing		
