= 2006 Maryland House of Delegates election =

- November 7, 2006

All 141 seats in the Maryland House of Delegates 71 seats needed for a majority
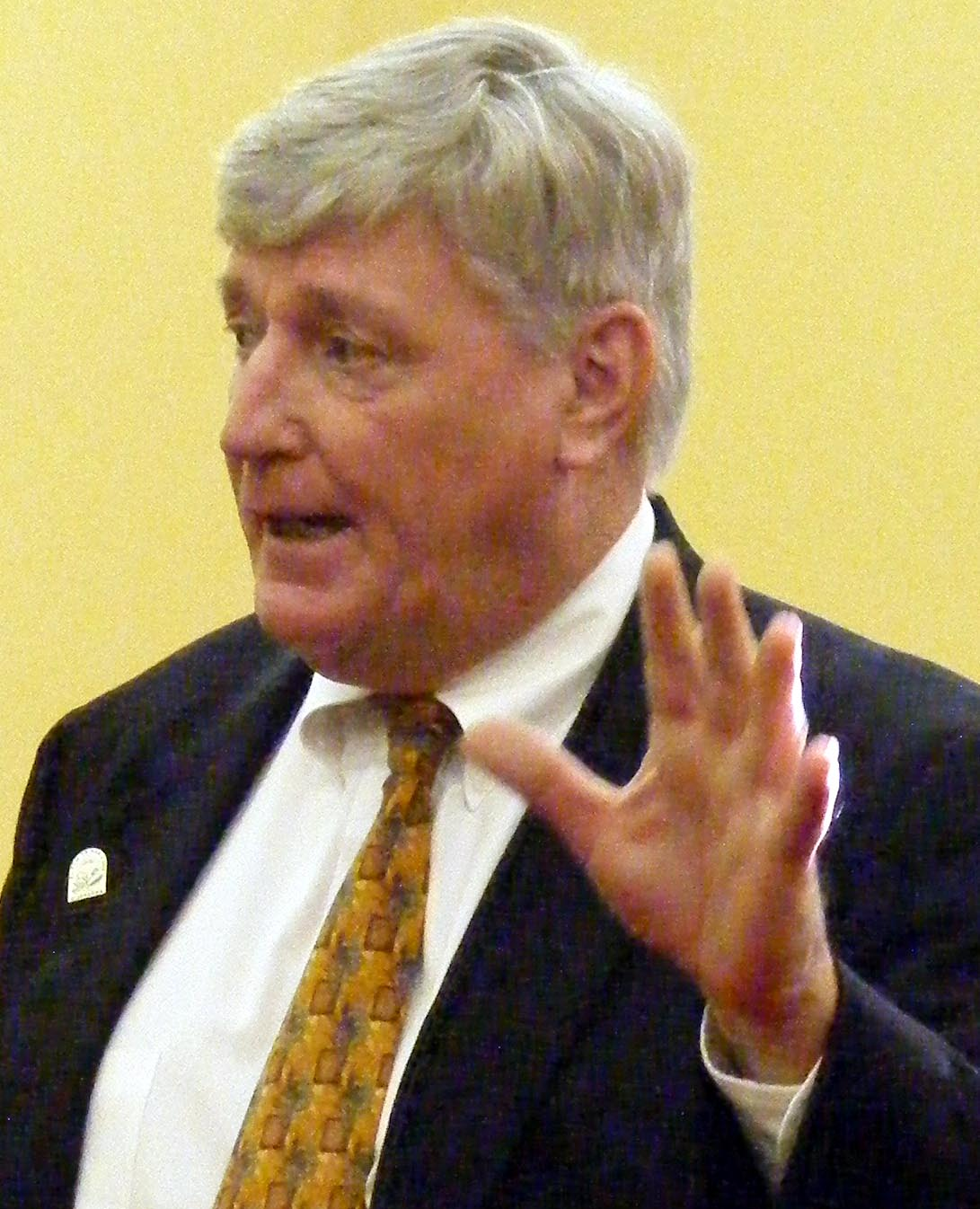

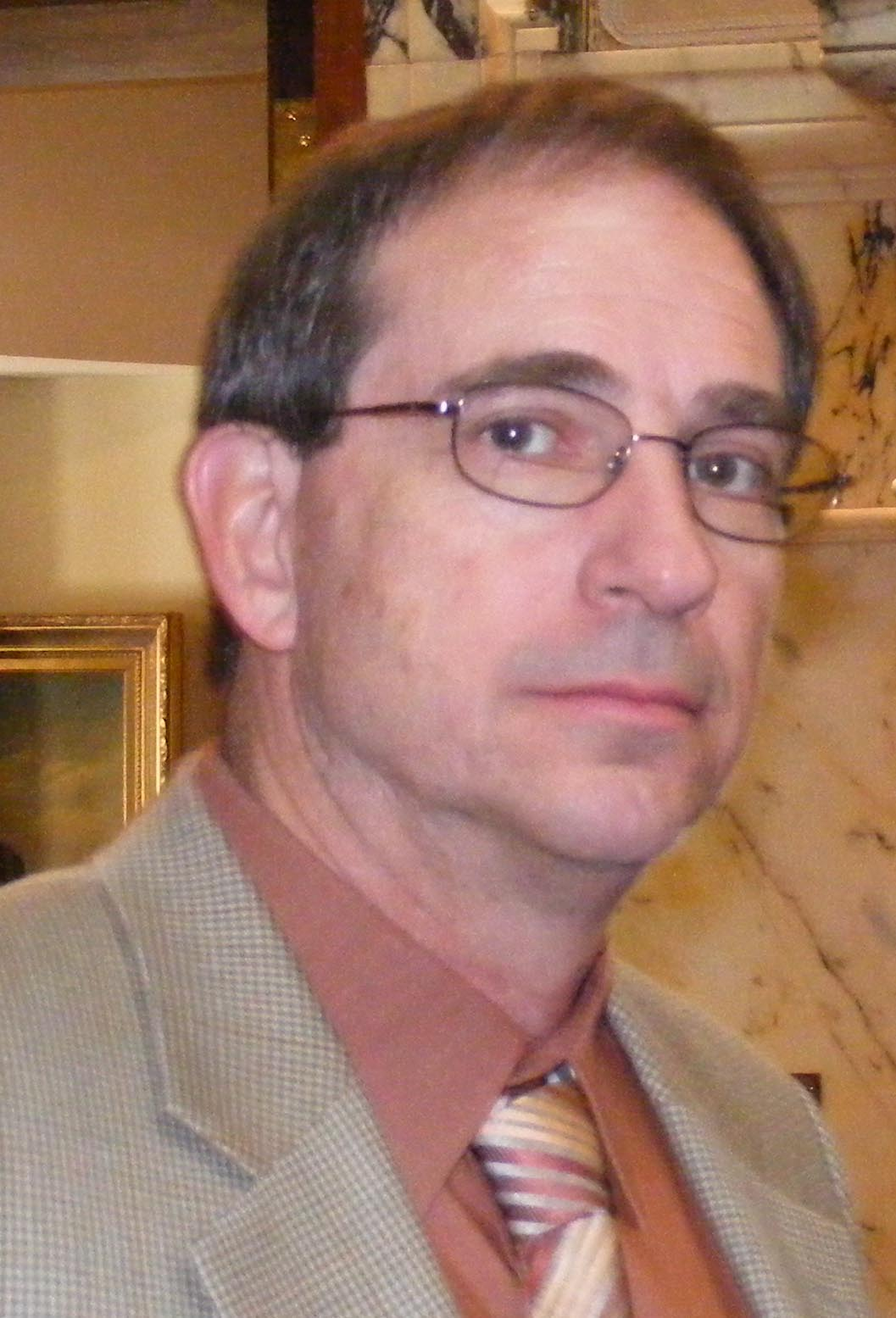
| | Majority party | Minority party |
|---|---|---|
| Leader | Michael E. Busch | George C. Edwards (retired) |
| Party | Democratic | Republican |
| Last election | 98 | 43 |
| Seats won | 104 | 37 |
| Seat change | ▲6 | ▼6 |
- Results: Democratic gain Republican gain Democratic hold Republican hold
Speaker before election
Michael E. Busch
Democratic
Elected Speaker
Michael E. Busch
Democratic

The 2006 Maryland House of Delegates elections were held on November 7, 2006, as part of the 2006 United States elections, including the 2006 Maryland gubernatorial election. All 141 of Maryland's state delegates were up for reelection. Democrats gained six seats in the House of Delegates, retaining supermajority control of the chamber.

== Retiring incumbents ==
=== Democrats ===
1. District 11: Robert Zirkin retired to run for state senator in District 11.
2. District 17: Michael R. Gordon retired.
3. District 18: Richard Madaleno retired to run for state senator in District 18.
4. District 19: Adrienne A. Mandel retired to run for state senator in District 19.
5. District 19: Carol S. Petzold retired to run for state senator in District 19.
6. District 20: Peter Franchot retired to run for comptroller.
7. District 21: Pauline Menes retired.
8. District 25: Anthony Brown retired to run for lieutenant governor.
9. District 26: Obie Patterson retired to run for state senator in District 26.
10. District 40: Catherine Pugh retired to run for state senator in District 40.
11. District 40: Salima Siler Marriott retired to run for state senator in District 40.
12. District 45: Clarence "Tiger" Davis retired.

=== Republicans ===
1. District 1A: George C. Edwards retired to run for state senator in District 1.
2. District 30: Herbert H. McMillan retired to run for state senator in District 30.
3. District 31: John R. Leopold retired to run for Anne Arundel County Executive.
4. District 33A: David G. Boschert retired.
5. District 42: John G. Trueschler retired.

== Incumbents defeated ==
=== In primaries ===
==== Democrats ====
1. District 13: Neil F. Quinter lost renomination to Guy Guzzone, Shane Pendergrass, and Frank S. Turner.
2. District 20: Gareth E. Murray lost renomination to Heather Mizeur, Sheila E. Hixson, and Tom Hucker.
3. District 21: Brian R. Moe lost renomination to Ben Barnes, Barbara A. Frush, and Joseline Peña-Melnyk.
4. District 23A: Mary A. Conroy lost renomination to James W. Hubbard and Gerron Levi.
5. District 26: Darryl A. Kelley lost renomination to Veronica L. Turner, Kris Valderrama, and Jay Walker.
6. District 39: Joan F. Stern lost renomination to Saqib Ali, Charles E. Barkley, and Nancy J. King.
7. District 40: Marshall T. Goodwin lost renomination to Frank M. Conaway Jr., Barbara A. Robinson, and Shawn Z. Tarrant.
8. District 44: Jeffrey A. Paige lost renomination to Keith E. Haynes, Ruth M. Kirk, and Melvin L. Stukes.
9. District 47: Rosetta C. Parker lost renomination to Jolene Ivey, Doyle Niemann, and Victor R. Ramirez.

==== Republicans ====
1. District 35A: Joanne S. Parrott lost renomination to Donna Stifler and Barry Glassman.

=== In the general election ===
==== Democrats ====
1. District 31: Joan Cadden lost to Don H. Dwyer Jr., Nic Kipke, and Steve Schuh.

==== Republicans ====
1. District 3A: Patrick N. Hogan lost to Sue Hecht and Galen R. Clagett.
2. District 8: John W. E. Cluster Jr. lost to Republican Joseph C. Boteler III and Democrats Eric M. Bromwell and Todd Schuler.
3. District 15: Jean B. Cryor lost to Kathleen Dumais, Brian Feldman, and Craig L. Rice.
4. District 28: William Daniel Mayer lost to Murray D. Levy, Sally Y. Jameson, and Peter Murphy.
5. District 32: Terry R. Gilleland Jr. lost to Pamela Beidle, Mary Ann Love, and Theodore J. Sophocleus.
6. District 34A: Sheryl Davis Kohl lost to B. Daniel Riley and Mary-Dulany James.

== Predictions ==
| Source | Ranking | As of |
|---|---|---|
| Rothenberg | Safe D | November 4, 2006 |

== List of districts ==
=== District 1A ===
==== Republican primary ====
Maryland House of Delegates District 1A Republican primary election, 2006
| Party | Candidate | Votes | % |
|---|---|---|---|
| Republican | Wendell R. Beitzel | 1,997 | 31.5 |
| Republican | Jay Moyer | 1,637 | 25.8 |
| Republican | Brenda Butscher | 1,212 | 19.1 |
| Republican | Dave Moe | 1,046 | 16.5 |
| Republican | DeCorsey Emroy Bolden | 450 | 7.1 |

==== General election ====
Maryland House of Delegates District 1A election, 2006
| Party | Candidate | Votes | % |
|---|---|---|---|
| Republican | Wendell R. Beitzel | 6,985 | 56.3 |
| Democratic | Bill Aiken | 5,406 | 43.5 |
| Write-in | | 24 | 0.2 |
| Republican hold | | | |

=== District 1B ===
Maryland House of Delegates District 1B election, 2006
| Party | Candidate | Votes | % |
|---|---|---|---|
| Democratic | Kevin Kelly (incumbent) | 6,489 | 55.7 |
| Republican | Mark A. Fisher | 5,151 | 44.2 |
| Write-in | | 20 | 0.2 |
| Democratic hold | | | |

=== District 1C ===
==== Democratic primary ====
Maryland House of Delegates District 1C Democratic primary election, 2006
| Party | Candidate | Votes | % |
|---|---|---|---|
| Democratic | Brian K. Grim | 1,316 | 55.1 |
| Democratic | Frederick J. Hill | 1,074 | 44.9 |

==== General election ====
Maryland House of Delegates District 1C election, 2006
| Party | Candidate | Votes | % |
|---|---|---|---|
| Republican | LeRoy E. Myers Jr. (incumbent) | 6,398 | 57.2 |
| Democratic | Brian K. Grim | 4,769 | 42.7 |
| Write-in | | 13 | 0.1 |
| Republican hold | | | |

=== District 2A ===
Maryland House of Delegates District 2A election, 2006
| Party | Candidate | Votes | % |
|---|---|---|---|
| Republican | Robert A. McKee (incumbent) | 11,676 | 99.2 |
| Write-in | | 94 | 0.8 |
| Republican hold | | | |

=== District 2B ===
Maryland House of Delegates District 2B election, 2006
| Party | Candidate | Votes | % |
|---|---|---|---|
| Republican | Christopher B. Shank (incumbent) | 9,606 | 99.0 |
| Write-in | | 101 | 1.0 |
| Republican hold | | | |

=== District 2C ===
==== Democratic primary ====
Maryland House of Delegates District 2C Democratic primary election, 2006
| Party | Candidate | Votes | % |
|---|---|---|---|
| Democratic | John P. Donoghue (incumbent) | 1,347 | 71.8 |
| Democratic | Scott Hesse | 530 | 28.2 |

==== Republican primary ====
Maryland House of Delegates District 2C Republican primary election, 2006
| Party | Candidate | Votes | % |
|---|---|---|---|
| Republican | Paul D. Muldowney | 1,769 | 81.4 |
| Republican | James M. Devine | 405 | 18.6 |

==== General election ====
Maryland House of Delegates District 2C election, 2006
| Party | Candidate | Votes | % |
|---|---|---|---|
| Democratic | John P. Donoghue (incumbent) | 5,099 | 55.5 |
| Republican | Paul D. Muldowney | 4,078 | 44.4 |
| Write-in | | 4 | 0.0 |
| Democratic hold | | | |

=== District 3A ===
Maryland House of Delegates District 3A election, 2006
| Party | Candidate | Votes | % |
|---|---|---|---|
| Democratic | Sue Hecht | 13,900 | 28.7 |
| Democratic | Galen R. Clagett (incumbent) | 12,422 | 25.7 |
| Republican | Patrick N. Hogan (incumbent) | 12,163 | 25.1 |
| Republican | Linda Naylor | 9,873 | 20.4 |
| Write-in | | 32 | 0.1 |
| Democratic gain from Republican | | | |
| Democratic hold | | | |

=== District 3B ===
==== Republican primary ====
Maryland House of Delegates District 3B Republican primary election, 2006
| Party | Candidate | Votes | % |
|---|---|---|---|
| Republican | Richard B. Weldon Jr. (incumbent) | 2,659 | 84.6 |
| Republican | Roy Burke II | 485 | 15.4 |

==== General election ====
Maryland House of Delegates District 3B election, 2006
| Party | Candidate | Votes | % |
|---|---|---|---|
| Republican | Richard B. Weldon Jr. (incumbent) | 10,057 | 61.4 |
| Democratic | Paul Gilligan | 6,317 | 38.6 |
| Write-in | | 9 | 0.1 |
| Republican hold | | | |

=== District 4A ===
Maryland House of Delegates District 4A election, 2006
| Party | Candidate | Votes | % |
|---|---|---|---|
| Republican | Paul S. Stull (incumbent) | 17,765 | 39.5 |
| Republican | Joseph R. Bartlett (incumbent) | 16,545 | 36.8 |
| Democratic | Maggi Margaret Hays | 10,519 | 23.4 |
| Write-in | | 140 | 0.3 |
| Republican hold | | | |
| Republican hold | | | |

=== District 4B ===
==== Republican primary ====
Maryland House of Delegates District 4B Republican primary election, 2006
| Party | Candidate | Votes | % |
|---|---|---|---|
| Republican | Donald B. Elliott (incumbent) | 2,397 | 71.8 |
| Republican | Bob Lubitz | 940 | 28.2 |

==== General election ====
Maryland House of Delegates District 4B election, 2006
| Party | Candidate | Votes | % |
|---|---|---|---|
| Republican | Donald B. Elliott (incumbent) | 10,148 | 69.8 |
| Democratic | Timothy Schlauch | 4,374 | 30.1 |
| Write-in | | 12 | 0.1 |
| Republican hold | | | |

=== District 5A ===
==== Republican primary ====
Maryland House of Delegates District 5A Republican primary election, 2006
| Party | Candidate | Votes | % |
|---|---|---|---|
| Republican | Nancy R. Stocksdale (incumbent) | 4,455 | 30.2 |
| Republican | Tanya Thornton Shewell (incumbent) | 3,519 | 23.8 |
| Republican | Haven Shoemaker | 2,172 | 14.7 |
| Republican | Kevin R. Utz | 1,847 | 12.5 |
| Republican | C. Scott Stone | 1,568 | 10.6 |
| Republican | William C. Niner | 903 | 6.1 |
| Republican | David D. Wallace II | 308 | 2.1 |

==== General election ====
Maryland House of Delegates District 5A election, 2006
| Party | Candidate | Votes | % |
|---|---|---|---|
| Republican | Nancy R. Stocksdale (incumbent) | 20,630 | 36.1 |
| Republican | Tanya Thornton Shewell (incumbent) | 18,785 | 32.9 |
| Democratic | Ann Darrin | 9,489 | 16.6 |
| Democratic | Frank Henry Rammes | 8,192 | 14.3 |
| Write-in | | 12 | 0.1 |
| Republican hold | | | |
| Republican hold | | | |

=== District 5B ===
Maryland House of Delegates District 5B election, 2006
| Party | Candidate | Votes | % |
|---|---|---|---|
| Republican | Wade Kach (incumbent) | 15,321 | 98.9 |
| Write-in | | 172 | 1.1 |
| Republican hold | | | |

=== District 6 ===
==== Democratic primary ====
Maryland House of Delegates District 6 Democratic primary election, 2006
| Party | Candidate | Votes | % |
|---|---|---|---|
| Democratic | Johnny Olszewski (incumbent) | 6,893 | 22.3 |
| Democratic | Joseph J. Minnick (incumbent) | 5,518 | 17.8 |
| Democratic | Michael H. Weir Jr. (incumbent) | 5,167 | 16.7 |
| Democratic | Jane Brooks | 3,811 | 12.3 |
| Democratic | Jake Mohorovic | 3,627 | 11.7 |
| Democratic | Ron Schaeffer | 2,956 | 9.5 |
| Democratic | Eric Washington | 1,675 | 5.4 |
| Democratic | Russ Mirabile | 1,330 | 4.3 |

==== Republican primary ====
Maryland House of Delegates District 6 Republican primary election, 2006
| Party | Candidate | Votes | % |
|---|---|---|---|
| Republican | Steve Dishon | 1,701 | 32.1 |
| Republican | Ric Metzgar | 1,504 | 28.4 |
| Republican | Paul M. Blitz | 1,157 | 21.8 |
| Republican | Steven C. Brown | 934 | 17.6 |

==== General election ====
Maryland House of Delegates District 6 election, 2006
| Party | Candidate | Votes | % |
|---|---|---|---|
| Democratic | Johnny Olszewski (incumbent) | 18,769 | 22.9 |
| Democratic | Joseph J. Minnick (incumbent) | 17,379 | 21.2 |
| Democratic | Michael H. Weir Jr. (incumbent) | 17,117 | 20.9 |
| Republican | Steve Dishon | 10,961 | 13.4 |
| Republican | Ric Metzgar | 8,915 | 10.9 |
| Republican | Paul M. Blitz | 8,765 | 10.7 |
| Write-in | | 106 | 0.1 |
| Democratic hold | | | |
| Democratic hold | | | |
| Democratic hold | | | |

=== District 7 ===
==== Republican primary ====
Maryland House of Delegates District 7 Republican primary election, 2006
| Party | Candidate | Votes | % |
|---|---|---|---|
| Republican | Pat McDonough (incumbent) | 4,214 | 30.1 |
| Republican | J. B. Jennings (incumbent) | 3,798 | 27.1 |
| Republican | Richard Impallaria (incumbent) | 3,654 | 26.1 |
| Republican | John T. Laing | 1,499 | 10.7 |
| Republican | Nikolai Volkoff | 845 | 6.0 |

==== Democratic primary ====
Maryland House of Delegates District 7 Democratic primary election, 2006
| Party | Candidate | Votes | % |
|---|---|---|---|
| Democratic | Linda W. Hart | 5,006 | 24.0 |
| Democratic | Jack Sturgill | 5,000 | 23.9 |
| Democratic | Rebecca L. Nelson | 3,233 | 15.5 |
| Democratic | Jim Stavropoulos Jr. | 2,941 | 14.1 |
| Democratic | Norman Gifford Jr. | 2,132 | 10.2 |
| Democratic | James Ward Morrow | 1,757 | 8.4 |
| Democratic | Gabe Purviance | 819 | 3.9 |

==== General election ====
Maryland House of Delegates District 7 election, 2006
| Party | Candidate | Votes | % |
|---|---|---|---|
| Republican | Pat McDonough (incumbent) | 23,184 | 20.3 |
| Republican | Richard Impallaria (incumbent) | 21,333 | 18.7 |
| Republican | J. B. Jennings (incumbent) | 21,189 | 18.6 |
| Democratic | Linda W. Hart | 17,122 | 15.0 |
| Democratic | Jack Sturgill | 15,390 | 13.5 |
| Democratic | Rebecca L. Nelson | 13,481 | 11.8 |
| Green | Kim Fell | 2,307 | 2.0 |
| Write-in | | 83 | 0.1 |
| Republican hold | | | |
| Republican hold | | | |
| Republican hold | | | |

=== District 8 ===
==== Republican primary ====
Maryland House of Delegates District 8 Republican primary election, 2006
| Party | Candidate | Votes | % |
|---|---|---|---|
| Republican | Joseph C. Boteler III (incumbent) | 3,702 | 31.6 |
| Republican | John W. E. Cluster Jr. (incumbent) | 3,448 | 29.4 |
| Republican | Melissa Redmer Mullahey | 3,448 | 29.4 |
| Republican | Anthony R. Davis | 1,281 | 10.9 |

==== Democratic primary ====
Maryland House of Delegates District 8 Democratic primary election, 2006
| Party | Candidate | Votes | % |
|---|---|---|---|
| Democratic | Eric M. Bromwell (incumbent) | 7,019 | 24.9 |
| Democratic | Todd Schuler | 6,428 | 22.8 |
| Democratic | Ruth Baisden | 6,141 | 21.8 |
| Democratic | Alec Frick | 3,514 | 12.5 |
| Democratic | Peter Definbaugh | 2,743 | 9.7 |
| Democratic | Andrea Lynn Koshko | 2,321 | 8.2 |

==== General election ====
Maryland House of Delegates District 8 election, 2006
| Party | Candidate | Votes | % |
|---|---|---|---|
| Democratic | Eric M. Bromwell (incumbent) | 20,116 | 17.9 |
| Republican | Joseph C. Boteler III (incumbent) | 19,586 | 17.4 |
| Democratic | Todd Schuler | 18,356 | 16.3 |
| Democratic | Ruth Baisden | 18,261 | 16.2 |
| Republican | Melissa Redmer Mullahey | 18,160 | 16.1 |
| Republican | John W. E. Cluster Jr. (incumbent) | 18,057 | 16.0 |
| Write-in | | 74 | 0.1 |
| Democratic hold | | | |
| Republican hold | | | |
| Democratic gain from Republican | | | |

=== District 9A ===
==== Republican primary ====
Maryland House of Delegates District 9A Republican primary election, 2006
| Party | Candidate | Votes | % |
|---|---|---|---|
| Republican | Gail H. Bates (incumbent) | 4,067 | 41.9 |
| Republican | Warren E. Miller (incumbent) | 3,630 | 37.4 |
| Republican | Melissa Ridgely Covolesky | 2,010 | 20.7 |

==== General election ====
Maryland House of Delegates District 9A election, 2006
| Party | Candidate | Votes | % |
|---|---|---|---|
| Republican | Gail H. Bates (incumbent) | 22,862 | 39.6 |
| Republican | Warren E. Miller (incumbent) | 18,533 | 32.1 |
| Democratic | David Leonard Osmundson | 16,162 | 28.0 |
| Write-in | | 123 | 0.2 |
| Republican hold | | | |
| Republican hold | | | |

=== District 9B ===
==== Republican primary ====
Maryland House of Delegates District 9B Republican primary election, 2006
| Party | Candidate | Votes | % |
|---|---|---|---|
| Republican | Susan W. Krebs (incumbent) | 2,283 | 52.5 |
| Republican | Larry Helminiak | 2,062 | 47.5 |

==== General election ====
Maryland House of Delegates District 9B election, 2006
| Party | Candidate | Votes | % |
|---|---|---|---|
| Republican | Susan W. Krebs (incumbent) | 12,059 | 72.1 |
| Democratic | Anita Lombardi Riley | 4,621 | 27.6 |
| Write-in | | 38 | 0.2 |
| Republican hold | | | |

=== District 10 ===
==== Democratic primary ====
Maryland House of Delegates District 10 Democratic primary election, 2006
| Party | Candidate | Votes | % |
|---|---|---|---|
| Democratic | Shirley Nathan-Pulliam (incumbent) | 12,828 | 32.6 |
| Democratic | Emmett C. Burns Jr. (incumbent) | 12,758 | 32.4 |
| Democratic | Adrienne A. Jones (incumbent) | 10,237 | 26.0 |
| Democratic | Barry Chapman | 3,521 | 8.9 |

==== General election ====
Maryland House of Delegates District 10 election, 2006
| Party | Candidate | Votes | % |
|---|---|---|---|
| Democratic | Emmett C. Burns Jr. (incumbent) | 29,140 | 34.2 |
| Democratic | Shirley Nathan-Pulliam (incumbent) | 28,544 | 33.5 |
| Democratic | Adrienne A. Jones (incumbent) | 27,064 | 31.8 |
| Write-in | | 370 | 0.4 |
| Democratic hold | | | |
| Democratic hold | | | |
| Democratic hold | | | |

=== District 11 ===
==== Democratic primary ====
Maryland House of Delegates District 11 Democratic primary election, 2006
| Party | Candidate | Votes | % |
|---|---|---|---|
| Democratic | Jon S. Cardin (incumbent) | 11,815 | 22.5 |
| Democratic | Dan K. Morhaim (incumbent) | 10,146 | 19.3 |
| Democratic | Dana Stein | 6,824 | 13.0 |
| Democratic | Rick Yaffe | 6,634 | 12.6 |
| Democratic | Sharon H. Bloom | 4,436 | 8.4 |
| Democratic | Jason A. Frank | 3,300 | 6.3 |
| Democratic | Julian Earl Jones | 3,291 | 6.3 |
| Democratic | Theodore Levin | 2,271 | 4.3 |
| Democratic | Noel Levy | 1,075 | 2.0 |
| Democratic | Stephen Knable | 979 | 1.9 |
| Democratic | Zhanna Anapolsky-Maydanich | 672 | 1.3 |
| Democratic | Ivan Goldstein | 579 | 1.1 |
| Democratic | V. Michael Koyfman | 526 | 1.0 |

==== General election ====
Maryland House of Delegates District 11 election, 2006
| Party | Candidate | Votes | % |
|---|---|---|---|
| Democratic | Jon S. Cardin (incumbent) | 32,747 | 25.8 |
| Democratic | Dan K. Morhaim (incumbent) | 31,185 | 24.6 |
| Democratic | Dana Stein | 30,481 | 24.0 |
| Republican | Patrick V. Dyer | 13,904 | 11.0 |
| Republican | Patrick Abbondandolo | 12,822 | 10.1 |
| Green | Dave Goldsmith | 5,435 | 4.3 |
| Write-in | | 181 | 0.1 |
| Democratic hold | | | |
| Democratic hold | | | |
| Democratic hold | | | |

=== District 12A ===
Maryland House of Delegates District 12A election, 2006
| Party | Candidate | Votes | % |
|---|---|---|---|
| Democratic | James E. Malone Jr. (incumbent) | 15,130 | 30.6 |
| Democratic | Steven J. DeBoy Sr. (incumbent) | 13,929 | 28.1 |
| Republican | Joe Hooe | 11,141 | 22.5 |
| Republican | Albert L. Nalley | 9,286 | 18.8 |
| Write-in | | 28 | 0.1 |
| Democratic hold | | | |
| Democratic hold | | | |

=== District 12B ===
Maryland House of Delegates District 12B election, 2006
| Party | Candidate | Votes | % |
|---|---|---|---|
| Democratic | Elizabeth Bobo (incumbent) | 11,892 | 75.3 |
| Republican | Christopher J. Feldwick | 3,885 | 24.6 |
| Write-in | | 7 | 0.0 |
| Democratic hold | | | |

=== District 13 ===
==== Democratic primary ====
Maryland House of Delegates District 13 Democratic primary election, 2006
| Party | Candidate | Votes | % |
|---|---|---|---|
| Democratic | Shane Pendergrass (incumbent) | 8,301 | 27.4 |
| Democratic | Guy Guzzone | 7,502 | 24.7 |
| Democratic | Frank S. Turner (incumbent) | 7,027 | 23.2 |
| Democratic | Neil F. Quinter (incumbent) | 5,252 | 17.3 |
| Democratic | Nina Basu | 2,242 | 7.4 |

==== General election ====
Maryland House of Delegates District 13 election, 2006
| Party | Candidate | Votes | % |
|---|---|---|---|
| Democratic | Guy Guzzone | 26,891 | 22.3 |
| Democratic | Shane Pendergrass (incumbent) | 26,633 | 22.1 |
| Democratic | Frank S. Turner (incumbent) | 24,437 | 20.3 |
| Republican | Mary Beth Tung | 15,216 | 12.6 |
| Republican | Rick Bowers | 13,665 | 11.4 |
| Republican | Loretta Gaffney | 13,466 | 11.2 |
| Write-in | | 84 | 0.1 |
| Democratic hold | | | |
| Democratic hold | | | |
| Democratic hold | | | |

==== Democratic primary ====
Maryland House of Delegates District 14 Democratic primary election, 2006
| Party | Candidate | Votes | % |
|---|---|---|---|
| Democratic | Karen S. Montgomery (incumbent) | 9,446 | 32.2 |
| Democratic | Anne Kaiser (incumbent) | 9,232 | 31.5 |
| Democratic | Herman L. Taylor Jr. (incumbent) | 9,143 | 31.2 |
| Democratic | Neda Bolourian | 1,488 | 5.1 |

==== General election ====
Maryland House of Delegates District 14 election, 2006
| Party | Candidate | Votes | % |
|---|---|---|---|
| Democratic | Anne Kaiser (incumbent) | 24,500 | 21.8 |
| Democratic | Karen S. Montgomery (incumbent) | 24,478 | 21.8 |
| Democratic | Herman L. Taylor Jr. (incumbent) | 24,273 | 21.6 |
| Republican | John McKinnis | 13,471 | 12.0 |
| Republican | John R. Austin | 12,963 | 11.5 |
| Republican | Jim Goldberg | 12,603 | 11.2 |
| Write-in | | 61 | 0.1 |
| Democratic hold | | | |
| Democratic hold | | | |
| Democratic hold | | | |

==== District 15 ====
Maryland House of Delegates District 15 election, 2006
| Party | Candidate | Votes | % |
|---|---|---|---|
| Democratic | Kathleen Dumais (incumbent) | 25,781 | 21.6 |
| Democratic | Brian J. Feldman (incumbent) | 25,760 | 21.6 |
| Democratic | Craig L. Rice | 20,202 | 17.0 |
| Republican | Jean B. Cryor (incumbent) | 20,050 | 16.8 |
| Republican | Brian Mezger | 14,112 | 11.8 |
| Republican | Chris Pilkerton | 13,174 | 11.1 |
| Write-in | | 55 | 0.0 |
| Democratic hold | | | |
| Democratic hold | | | |
| Democratic gain from Republican | | | |

==== Democratic primary ====
Maryland House of Delegates District 16 Democratic primary election, 2006
| Party | Candidate | Votes | % |
|---|---|---|---|
| Democratic | William A. Bronrott (incumbent) | 12,538 | 28.1 |
| Democratic | Susan C. Lee (incumbent) | 12,265 | 27.5 |
| Democratic | Marilyn R. Goldwater (incumbent) | 9,274 | 20.8 |
| Democratic | Regina "Reggie" Oldak | 7,994 | 17.9 |
| Democratic | Charles F. Chester | 2,488 | 5.6 |

==== General election ====
Maryland House of Delegates District 16 election, 2006
| Party | Candidate | Votes | % |
|---|---|---|---|
| Democratic | Marilyn R. Goldwater (incumbent) | 33,249 | 25.1 |
| Democratic | Susan C. Lee (incumbent) | 33,064 | 25.0 |
| Democratic | William A. Bronrott (incumbent) | 33,004 | 25.0 |
| Republican | Robert F. Dyer | 11,504 | 8.7 |
| Republican | Angela M. Markelonis | 10,924 | 8.3 |
| Republican | Mike Monroe | 10,433 | 7.9 |
| Write-in | | 98 | 0.1 |
| Democratic hold | | | |
| Democratic hold | | | |
| Democratic hold | | | |

==== Democratic primary ====
Maryland House of Delegates District 17 Democratic primary election, 2006
| Party | Candidate | Votes | % |
|---|---|---|---|
| Democratic | Luiz R. S. Simmons (incumbent) | 6,744 | 25.0 |
| Democratic | Kumar P. Barve (incumbent) | 6,439 | 23.9 |
| Democratic | James W. Gilchrist | 4,108 | 15.2 |
| Democratic | Ryan Spiegel | 3,589 | 13.3 |
| Democratic | Laura Farthing Berthiaume | 2,549 | 9.4 |
| Democratic | Elbridge James | 2,385 | 8.8 |
| Democratic | Cory Siansky | 1,165 | 4.3 |

==== General election ====
Maryland House of Delegates District 17 election, 2006
| Party | Candidate | Votes | % |
|---|---|---|---|
| Democratic | James W. Gilchrist | 23,524 | 25.4 |
| Democratic | Luiz R. S. Simmons (incumbent) | 22,148 | 23.9 |
| Democratic | Kumar P. Barve (incumbent) | 21,994 | 23.7 |
| Republican | Mary Haley | 9,016 | 9.7 |
| Republican | Josephine J. Wang | 8,384 | 9.0 |
| Republican | Paul N. Hnarakis | 7,535 | 8.1 |
| Write-in | | 75 | 0.1 |
| Democratic hold | | | |
| Democratic hold | | | |
| Democratic hold | | | |

==== Democratic primary ====
Maryland House of Delegates District 18 Democratic primary election, 2006
| Party | Candidate | Votes | % |
|---|---|---|---|
| Democratic | Jane Lawton (incumbent) | 8,168 | 19.7 |
| Democratic | Ana Sol Gutierrez (incumbent) | 6,733 | 16.2 |
| Democratic | Jeff Waldstreicher | 6,345 | 15.3 |
| Democratic | Daniel E. Farrington | 5,898 | 14.2 |
| Democratic | Dana Beyer | 5,128 | 12.3 |
| Democratic | James Browning | 4,507 | 10.8 |
| Democratic | Alfred C. Carr Jr. | 3,468 | 8.3 |

==== General election ====
Maryland House of Delegates District 18 election, 2006
| Party | Candidate | Votes | % |
|---|---|---|---|
| Democratic | Jane Lawton (incumbent) | 26,994 | 25.9 |
| Democratic | Ana Sol Gutierrez (incumbent) | 26,751 | 25.6 |
| Democratic | Jeff Waldstreicher | 26,315 | 25.2 |
| Republican | Joan Pleiman | 8,137 | 7.8 |
| Republican | Richard A. Fenati | 8,134 | 7.8 |
| Republican | Lorri D. Simmons | 7,926 | 7.6 |
| Write-in | | 134 | 0.1 |
| Democratic hold | | | |
| Democratic hold | | | |
| Democratic hold | | | |

==== Democratic primary ====
Maryland House of Delegates District 19 Democratic primary election, 2006
| Party | Candidate | Votes | % |
|---|---|---|---|
| Democratic | Roger Manno | 7,389 | 20.3 |
| Democratic | Henry B. Heller (incumbent) | 6,476 | 17.8 |
| Democratic | Benjamin F. Kramer | 5,119 | 14.0 |
| Democratic | Paul Griffin | 4,812 | 13.2 |
| Democratic | Alec Stone | 4,641 | 12.7 |
| Democratic | Tom DeGonia | 3,781 | 10.4 |
| Democratic | Melodye A. Berry | 2,369 | 6.5 |
| Democratic | Guled Kassim | 1,868 | 5.1 |

==== General election ====
Maryland House of Delegates District 19 election, 2006
| Party | Candidate | Votes | % |
|---|---|---|---|
| Democratic | Henry B. Heller (incumbent) | 24,928 | 23.6 |
| Democratic | Benjamin F. Kramer | 24,707 | 23.3 |
| Democratic | Roger Manno | 24,598 | 23.2 |
| Republican | John R. Joaquin | 10,647 | 10.1 |
| Republican | Thomas Hardman | 10,474 | 9.9 |
| Republican | Tom Masser | 10,348 | 9.8 |
| Write-in | | 141 | 0.1 |
| Democratic hold | | | |
| Democratic hold | | | |
| Democratic hold | | | |

==== Democratic primary ====
Maryland House of Delegates District 20 Democratic primary election, 2006
| Party | Candidate | Votes | % |
|---|---|---|---|
| Democratic | Heather Mizeur | 8,176 | 21.9 |
| Democratic | Sheila E. Hixson (incumbent) | 7,379 | 19.7 |
| Democratic | Tom Hucker | 7,331 | 19.6 |
| Democratic | Aaron Klein | 6,388 | 17.1 |
| Democratic | Lucinda Lessley | 3,336 | 8.9 |
| Democratic | Diane Lee Nixon | 2,426 | 6.5 |
| Democratic | Gareth E. Murray (incumbent) | 2,353 | 6.3 |

==== General election ====
Maryland House of Delegates District 20 election, 2006
| Party | Candidate | Votes | % |
|---|---|---|---|
| Democratic | Sheila E. Hixson (incumbent) | 24,124 | 32.0 |
| Democratic | Heather Mizeur | 23,233 | 30.8 |
| Democratic | Tom Hucker | 22,704 | 30.1 |
| Republican | John W. Wrightson | 5,032 | 6.7 |
| Write-in | | 266 | 0.4 |
| Democratic hold | | | |
| Democratic hold | | | |
| Democratic hold | | | |

=== District 21 ===
==== Democratic primary ====
Maryland House of Delegates District 21 Democratic primary election, 2006
| Party | Candidate | Votes | % |
|---|---|---|---|
| Democratic | Barbara A. Frush (incumbent) | 4,328 | 20.8 |
| Democratic | Joseline Peña-Melnyk | 4,288 | 20.3 |
| Democratic | Ben Barnes | 5,169 | 20.0 |
| Democratic | Brian R. Moe (incumbent) | 4,355 | 16.8 |
| Democratic | Tekisha Everette | 2,042 | 7.9 |
| Democratic | Mark Cook | 1,771 | 6.9 |
| Democratic | Michael B. Sarich | 1,346 | 5.2 |
| Democratic | Jon Black | 538 | 2.1 |

==== General election ====
Maryland House of Delegates District 21 election, 2006
| Party | Candidate | Votes | % |
|---|---|---|---|
| Democratic | Ben Barnes | 18,453 | 29.6 |
| Democratic | Barbara A. Frush (incumbent) | 18,279 | 29.3 |
| Democratic | Joseline Peña-Melnyk | 18,001 | 28.9 |
| Republican | Neil B. Sood | 7,349 | 11.8 |
| Write-in | | 206 | 0.3 |
| Democratic hold | | | |
| Democratic hold | | | |
| Democratic hold | | | |

=== District 22 ===
==== Democratic primary ====
Maryland House of Delegates District 22 Democratic primary election, 2006
| Party | Candidate | Votes | % |
|---|---|---|---|
| Democratic | Tawanna P. Gaines (incumbent) | 6,947 | 29.4 |
| Democratic | Justin Ross (incumbent) | 6,382 | 27.0 |
| Democratic | Anne Healey (incumbent) | 5,865 | 24.8 |
| Democratic | Karren Pope-Onwukwe | 4,418 | 18.7 |

==== General election ====
Maryland House of Delegates District 22 election, 2006
| Party | Candidate | Votes | % |
|---|---|---|---|
| Democratic | Tawanna P. Gaines (incumbent) | 17,572 | 33.9 |
| Democratic | Anne Healey (incumbent) | 17,258 | 33.3 |
| Democratic | Justin Ross (incumbent) | 16,818 | 32.4 |
| Write-in | | 187 | 0.4 |
| Democratic hold | | | |
| Democratic hold | | | |
| Democratic hold | | | |

=== District 23A ===
==== Democratic primary ====
Maryland House of Delegates District 23A Democratic primary election, 2006
| Party | Candidate | Votes | % |
|---|---|---|---|
| Democratic | James W. Hubbard (incumbent) | 4,768 | 28.1 |
| Democratic | Gerron Levi | 4,755 | 28.0 |
| Democratic | Mary A. Conroy (incumbent) | 4,272 | 25.2 |
| Democratic | Shukoor Ahmed | 3,168 | 18.7 |

==== General election ====
Maryland House of Delegates District 23A election, 2006
| Party | Candidate | Votes | % |
|---|---|---|---|
| Democratic | James W. Hubbard (incumbent) | 17,765 | 47.6 |
| Democratic | Gerron Levi | 15,959 | 42.8 |
| Constitution | Steve Krukar | 3,479 | 9.3 |
| Write-in | | 116 | 0.3 |
| Democratic hold | | | |
| Democratic hold | | | |

=== District 23B ===
Maryland House of Delegates District 23B election, 2006
| Party | Candidate | Votes | % |
|---|---|---|---|
| Democratic | Marvin E. Holmes Jr. (incumbent) | 11,951 | 99.4 |
| Write-in | | 77 | 0.6 |
| Democratic hold | | | |

=== District 24 ===
==== Democratic primary ====
Maryland House of Delegates District 24 Democratic primary election, 2006
| Party | Candidate | Votes | % |
|---|---|---|---|
| Democratic | Joanne C. Benson (incumbent) | 9,271 | 30.7 |
| Democratic | Carolyn J. B. Howard (incumbent) | 9,224 | 30.6 |
| Democratic | Michael L. Vaughn (incumbent) | 7,970 | 26.4 |
| Democratic | Darren Swain | 3,712 | 12.3 |

==== General election ====
Maryland House of Delegates District 24 election, 2006
| Party | Candidate | Votes | % |
|---|---|---|---|
| Democratic | Joanne C. Benson (incumbent) | 19,081 | 33.5 |
| Democratic | Carolyn J. B. Howard (incumbent) | 19,007 | 33.4 |
| Democratic | Michael L. Vaughn (incumbent) | 18,806 | 33.0 |
| Write-in | | 66 | 0.1 |
| Democratic hold | | | |
| Democratic hold | | | |
| Democratic hold | | | |

=== District 25 ===
==== Democratic primary ====
Maryland House of Delegates District 25 Democratic primary election, 2006
| Party | Candidate | Votes | % |
|---|---|---|---|
| Democratic | Melony G. Griffith (incumbent) | 7,745 | 20.9 |
| Democratic | Dereck E. Davis (incumbent) | 7,365 | 19.8 |
| Democratic | Aisha Braveboy | 5,841 | 15.7 |
| Democratic | James L. Walls | 5,170 | 13.9 |
| Democratic | Shirley P. Thompson | 5,000 | 13.5 |
| Democratic | Sharrarne Morton | 3,882 | 10.5 |
| Democratic | Robert J. Barnes | 2,110 | 5.7 |

==== General election ====
Maryland House of Delegates District 25 election, 2006
| Party | Candidate | Votes | % |
|---|---|---|---|
| Democratic | Aisha Braveboy | 22,632 | 32.6 |
| Democratic | Melony G. Griffith (incumbent) | 21,584 | 31.1 |
| Democratic | Dereck E. Davis (incumbent) | 21,540 | 31.1 |
| Republican | Patrick A. Schaeffer Jr. | 2,541 | 3.7 |
| Green | David Kiasi | 999 | 1.4 |
| Write-in | | 62 | 0.1 |
| Democratic hold | | | |
| Democratic hold | | | |
| Democratic hold | | | |

=== District 26 ===
==== Democratic primary ====
Maryland House of Delegates District 26 Democratic primary election, 2006
| Party | Candidate | Votes | % |
|---|---|---|---|
| Democratic | Veronica L. Turner (incumbent) | 8,489 | 19.1 |
| Democratic | Jay Walker | 6,184 | 13.9 |
| Democratic | Kris Valderrama | 6,177 | 13.9 |
| Democratic | Kris Valderrama | 6,177 | 13.9 |
| Democratic | Ollie Anderson | 6,087 | 13.7 |
| Democratic | Darryl A. Kelley (incumbent) | 5,125 | 11.6 |
| Democratic | Earl Adams | 4,603 | 10.4 |
| Democratic | Jerry J. Mathis | 2,972 | 6.7 |
| Democratic | Nathaniel Bryant | 1,939 | 4.4 |
| Democratic | Xavier Aragona | 1,823 | 4.1 |
| Democratic | Jocelyne G. Stichberry | 947 | 2.1 |

==== General election ====
Maryland House of Delegates District 26 election, 2006
| Party | Candidate | Votes | % |
|---|---|---|---|
| Democratic | Veronica L. Turner (incumbent) | 24,891 | 34.1 |
| Democratic | Kris Valderrama | 22,231 | 30.5 |
| Democratic | Jay Walker | 22,162 | 30.4 |
| Republican | John Rowe | 3,587 | 4.9 |
| Write-in | | 108 | 0.1 |
| Democratic hold | | | |
| Democratic hold | | | |
| Democratic hold | | | |

=== District 27A ===
==== Democratic primary ====
Maryland House of Delegates District 27A Democratic primary election, 2006
| Party | Candidate | Votes | % |
|---|---|---|---|
| Democratic | James E. Proctor Jr. (incumbent) | 7,882 | 35.7 |
| Democratic | Joseph F. Vallario Jr. (incumbent) | 6,959 | 31.5 |
| Democratic | Tamara Davis Brown | 5,074 | 23.0 |
| Democratic | Sheri L. Beach | 1,146 | 5.2 |
| Democratic | Russell P. Butler | 655 | 3.0 |
| Democratic | Jeffrey Lane Brockington | 362 | 1.6 |

==== Republican primary ====
Maryland House of Delegates District 27A Democratic primary election, 2006
| Party | Candidate | Votes | % |
|---|---|---|---|
| Republican | Kenneth S. Brown | 986 | 41.9 |
| Republican | Antoinette "Toni" Jarboe-Duley | 707 | 30.0 |
| Republican | Mike Hethmon | 661 | 28.1 |

==== General election ====
Maryland House of Delegates District 27A election, 2006
| Party | Candidate | Votes | % |
|---|---|---|---|
| Democratic | James E. Proctor Jr. (incumbent) | 19,829 | 40.3 |
| Democratic | Joseph F. Vallario Jr. (incumbent) | 18,677 | 38.0 |
| Republican | Kenneth S. Brown | 5,687 | 11.6 |
| Republican | Antoinette "Toni" Jarboe-Duley | 4,948 | 10.1 |
| Write-in | | 48 | 0.1 |
| Democratic hold | | | |
| Democratic hold | | | |

=== District 27B ===
Maryland House of Delegates District 27B election, 2006
| Party | Candidate | Votes | % |
|---|---|---|---|
| Democratic | Sue Kullen (incumbent) | 8,236 | 56.8 |
| Republican | David Hale | 6,250 | 43.1 |
| Write-in | | 9 | 0.1 |
| Democratic hold | | | |

=== District 28 ===
==== Democratic primary ====
Maryland House of Delegates District 28 Democratic primary election, 2006
| Party | Candidate | Votes | % |
|---|---|---|---|
| Democratic | Sally Y. Jameson (incumbent) | 6,605 | 28.5 |
| Democratic | Murray D. Levy (incumbent) | 6,003 | 25.9 |
| Democratic | Peter Murphy (incumbent) | 5,847 | 25.2 |
| Democratic | Gregory Vincent Billups | 4,746 | 20.5 |

==== General election ====
Maryland House of Delegates District 28 election, 2006
| Party | Candidate | Votes | % |
|---|---|---|---|
| Democratic | Sally Y. Jameson (incumbent) | 24,051 | 24.5 |
| Democratic | Murray D. Levy (incumbent) | 23,435 | 23.9 |
| Democratic | Peter Murphy (incumbent) | 21,190 | 21.6 |
| Republican | William Daniel Mayer (incumbent) | 15,978 | 16.3 |
| Republican | James H. Crawford | 13,343 | 13.6 |
| Write-in | | 135 | 0.1 |
| Democratic hold | | | |
| Democratic hold | | | |
| Democratic gain from Republican | | | |

=== District 29A ===
==== Democratic primary ====
Maryland House of Delegates District 29A Democratic primary election, 2006
| Party | Candidate | Votes | % |
|---|---|---|---|
| Democratic | John F. Wood Jr. (incumbent) | 3,110 | 74.0 |
| Democratic | Clare Calvert Whitbeck | 1,095 | 26.0 |
| Democratic hold | | | |

==== General election ====
Maryland House of Delegates District 29A election, 2006
| Party | Candidate | Votes | % |
|---|---|---|---|
| Democratic | John F. Wood Jr. (incumbent) | 8,695 | 65.2 |
| Republican | Joe DiMarco | 4,613 | 34.6 |
| Write-in | | 20 | 0.2 |
| Democratic hold | | | |

=== District 29B ===
==== Democratic primary ====
Maryland House of Delegates District 29B Democratic primary election, 2006
| Party | Candidate | Votes | % |
|---|---|---|---|
| Democratic | John L. Bohanan Jr. (incumbent) | 3,017 | 86.6 |
| Democratic | Clare Calvert Whitbeck | 465 | 13.4 |
| Democratic hold | | | |

==== General election ====
Maryland House of Delegates District 29B election, 2006
| Party | Candidate | Votes | % |
|---|---|---|---|
| Democratic | John L. Bohanan Jr. (incumbent) | 8,077 | 64.0 |
| Republican | Noel Temple Wood | 4,528 | 35.9 |
| Write-in | | 8 | 0.1 |
| Democratic hold | | | |

=== District 29C ===
Maryland House of Delegates District 29C election, 2006
| Party | Candidate | Votes | % |
|---|---|---|---|
| Republican | Tony O'Donnell (incumbent) | 7,739 | 60.3 |
| Democratic | Norma Powers | 5,091 | 39.6 |
| Write-in | | 11 | 0.1 |
| Republican hold | | | |

=== District 30 ===
==== Democratic primary ====
Maryland House of Delegates District 30 Democratic primary election, 2006
| Party | Candidate | Votes | % |
|---|---|---|---|
| Democratic | Michael E. Busch (incumbent) | 9,419 | 29.2 |
| Democratic | Virginia P. Clagett (incumbent) | 9,022 | 28.0 |
| Democratic | Barbara Samorajczyk | 7,139 | 22.2 |
| Democratic | Konrad M. Wayson | 4,161 | 12.9 |
| Democratic | Shirley May Little | 2,484 | 7.7 |

==== Republican primary ====
Maryland House of Delegates District 30 Republican primary election, 2006
| Party | Candidate | Votes | % |
|---|---|---|---|
| Republican | Ron George | 5,324 | 23.8 |
| Republican | Andy Smarick | 4,524 | 20.2 |
| Republican | Ron Elfenbein | 3,913 | 17.5 |
| Republican | Mike Collins | 3,264 | 14.6 |
| Republican | Nancy Almgren | 3,190 | 14.3 |
| Republican | Les Belcher | 1,818 | 8.1 |
| Republican | Adelsia Braxton | 339 | 1.5 |

==== General election ====
Maryland House of Delegates District 30 election, 2006
| Party | Candidate | Votes | % |
|---|---|---|---|
| Democratic | Michael E. Busch (incumbent) | 22,479 | 17.1 |
| Democratic | Virginia P. Clagett (incumbent) | 22,360 | 17.0 |
| Republican | Ron George | 21,811 | 16.6 |
| Democratic | Barbara Samorajczyk | 21,758 | 16.5 |
| Republican | Andy Smarick | 20,594 | 15.6 |
| Republican | Ron Elfenbein | 20,457 | 15.5 |
| Constitution | David Whitney | 2,225 | 1.7 |
| Write-in | | 80 | 0.1 |
| Democratic hold | | | |
| Democratic hold | | | |
| Republican hold | | | |

=== District 31 ===
==== Republican primary ====
Maryland House of Delegates District 31 Democratic primary election, 2006
| Party | Candidate | Votes | % |
|---|---|---|---|
| Republican | Steve Schuh | 4,860 | 28.6 |
| Republican | Don H. Dwyer Jr. (incumbent) | 3,641 | 21.5 |
| Republican | Nic Kipke | 3,514 | 20.7 |
| Republican | James Christopher Braswell | 2,627 | 15.5 |
| Republican | Pat Corcoran | 2,325 | 13.7 |

==== Democratic primary ====
Maryland House of Delegates District 31 Democratic primary election, 2006
| Party | Candidate | Votes | % |
|---|---|---|---|
| Democratic | Joan Cadden (incumbent) | 7,836 | 28.6 |
| Democratic | Thomas J. Fleckenstein | 6,037 | 22.0 |
| Democratic | Craig A. Reynolds | 4,293 | 15.7 |
| Democratic | Ed Garcia | 2,164 | 7.9 |
| Democratic | Rose M. Forrest | 2,127 | 7.8 |
| Democratic | George Charles Law | 2,102 | 7.7 |
| Democratic | Mike Cadogan | 1,658 | 6.0 |
| Democratic | Justin M. Towles | 1,208 | 4.4 |

==== General election ====
Maryland House of Delegates District 31 election, 2006
| Party | Candidate | Votes | % |
|---|---|---|---|
| Republican | Steve Schuh | 19,049 | 18.4 |
| Republican | Nic Kipke | 18,150 | 17.5 |
| Republican | Don H. Dwyer Jr. (incumbent) | 17,558 | 17.0 |
| Democratic | Joan Cadden (incumbent) | 17,533 | 16.9 |
| Democratic | Thomas J. Fleckenstein | 16,654 | 16.1 |
| Democratic | Craig A. Reynolds | 14,454 | 14.0 |
| Write-in | | 58 | 0.1 |
| Republican hold | | | |
| Republican hold | | | |
| Republican gain from Democratic | | | |

=== District 32 ===
==== Republican primary ====
Maryland House of Delegates District 32 Republican primary election, 2006
| Party | Candidate | Votes | % |
|---|---|---|---|
| Republican | Mark S. Chang | 3,913 | 30.4 |
| Republican | Terry R. Gilleland Jr. (incumbent) | 3,913 | 30.4 |
| Republican | Wayne Charles Smith | 2,829 | 21.9 |
| Republican | Tiger Pimentel | 1,796 | 13.9 |
| Republican | Robert Middleswarth | 1,426 | 11.1 |

==== General election ====
Maryland House of Delegates District 32 election, 2006
| Party | Candidate | Votes | % |
|---|---|---|---|
| Democratic | Pamela Beidle | 17,964 | 18.6 |
| Democratic | Mary Ann Love (incumbent) | 17,697 | 18.3 |
| Democratic | Theodore J. Sophocleus (incumbent) | 17,661 | 18.3 |
| Republican | Mark S. Chang | 16,569 | 17.1 |
| Republican | Terry R. Gilleland Jr. (incumbent) | 13,632 | 14.1 |
| Republican | Wayne Charles Smith | 13,153 | 13.6 |
| Write-in | | 75 | 0.1 |
| Democratic hold | | | |
| Democratic hold | | | |
| Democratic gain from Republican | | | |

=== District 33A ===
==== Republican primary ====
Maryland House of Delegates District 33A Republican primary election, 2006
| Party | Candidate | Votes | % |
|---|---|---|---|
| Republican | Tony McConkey (incumbent) | 3,546 | 28.8 |
| Republican | James King | 3,245 | 26.4 |
| Republican | Greg Kline | 2,210 | 18.0 |
| Republican | John H. Hollywood | 2,075 | 16.9 |
| Republican | Daniel Alan Grimes | 1,235 | 10.0 |

==== Democratic primary ====
Maryland House of Delegates District 33A Democratic primary election, 2006
| Party | Candidate | Votes | % |
|---|---|---|---|
| Democratic | Patricia Weathersbee | 4,999 | 43.8 |
| Democratic | Paul G. Rudolph | 3,323 | 29.1 |
| Democratic | Torrey Jacobsen | 3,092 | 27.1 |

==== General election ====
Maryland House of Delegates District 33A election, 2006
| Party | Candidate | Votes | % |
|---|---|---|---|
| Republican | James King | 18,542 | 29.0 |
| Republican | Tony McConkey (incumbent) | 16,655 | 26.0 |
| Democratic | Patricia Weathersbee | 15,226 | 23.8 |
| Democratic | Paul G. Rudolph | 13,461 | 21.0 |
| Write-in | | 73 | 0.1 |
| Republican hold | | | |
| Republican hold | | | |

=== District 33B ===
Maryland House of Delegates District 33B election, 2006
| Party | Candidate | Votes | % |
|---|---|---|---|
| Republican | Robert A. Costa (incumbent) | 10,484 | 58.1 |
| Democratic | Mike Shay | 7,568 | 41.9 |
| Write-in | | 7 | 0.0 |
| Republican hold | | | |

=== District 34A ===
==== Republican primary ====
Maryland House of Delegates District 34A Republican primary election, 2006
| Party | Candidate | Votes | % |
|---|---|---|---|
| Republican | Sheryl Davis Kohl (incumbent) | 2,007 | 42.5 |
| Republican | Glen Glass | 1,389 | 29.4 |
| Republican | Christopher W. Pate | 1,324 | 28.1 |

==== Democratic primary ====
Maryland House of Delegates District 34A Democratic primary election, 2006
| Party | Candidate | Votes | % |
|---|---|---|---|
| Democratic | Mary-Dulany James (incumbent) | 3,632 | 35.5 |
| Democratic | B. Daniel Riley | 2,635 | 25.8 |
| Democratic | Maria Posey-Moss | 2,086 | 20.4 |
| Democratic | Jerome Foster | 1,007 | 9.9 |
| Democratic | Mark F. Franz | 857 | 8.4 |

==== General election ====
Maryland House of Delegates District 34A election, 2006
| Party | Candidate | Votes | % |
|---|---|---|---|
| Democratic | Mary-Dulany James (incumbent) | 12,903 | 31.7 |
| Democratic | B. Daniel Riley | 11,121 | 27.3 |
| Republican | Glen Glass | 8,554 | 21.0 |
| Republican | Sheryl Davis Kohl (incumbent) | 8,085 | 19.9 |
| Write-in | | 22 | 0.1 |
| Democratic hold | | | |
| Democratic gain from Republican | | | |

=== District 34B ===
==== Republican primary ====
Maryland House of Delegates District 34B Republican primary election, 2006
| Party | Candidate | Votes | % |
|---|---|---|---|
| Republican | Ewing McDowell | 1,449 | 63.3 |
| Republican | Bill Herold | 840 | 36.7 |

==== General election ====
Maryland House of Delegates District 34B election, 2006
| Party | Candidate | Votes | % |
|---|---|---|---|
| Democratic | David D. Rudolph (incumbent) | 7,716 | 55.0 |
| Republican | Ewing McDowell | 6,301 | 44.9 |
| Write-in | | 6 | 0.0 |
| Democratic hold | | | |

=== District 35A ===
==== Republican primary ====
Maryland House of Delegates District 35A Republican primary election, 2006
| Party | Candidate | Votes | % |
|---|---|---|---|
| Republican | Barry Glassman (incumbent) | 5,290 | 38.6 |
| Republican | Donna Stifler | 4,639 | 33.9 |
| Republican | Joanne S. Parrott (incumbent) | 3,759 | 27.5 |

==== General election ====
Maryland House of Delegates District 35A election, 2006
| Party | Candidate | Votes | % |
|---|---|---|---|
| Republican | Barry Glassman (incumbent) | 21,766 | 40.1 |
| Republican | Donna Stifler | 18,909 | 34.8 |
| Democratic | Craig H. DeRan | 13,589 | 25.0 |
| Write-in | | 81 | 0.1 |
| Republican hold | | | |
| Republican hold | | | |

=== District 35B ===
==== Republican primary ====
Maryland House of Delegates District 35B Republican primary election, 2006
| Party | Candidate | Votes | % |
|---|---|---|---|
| Republican | Susan K. McComas (incumbent) | 2,539 | 73.7 |
| Republican | Jim Welch | 904 | 26.3 |

==== General election ====
Maryland House of Delegates District 35B election, 2006
| Party | Candidate | Votes | % |
|---|---|---|---|
| Republican | Susan K. McComas (incumbent) | 10,922 | 62.5 |
| Democratic | David Carey | 6,536 | 37.4 |
| Write-in | | 9 | 0.1 |
| Republican hold | | | |

=== District 36 ===
==== Republican primary ====
Maryland House of Delegates District 36 Republican primary election, 2006
| Party | Candidate | Votes | % |
|---|---|---|---|
| Republican | Richard A. Sossi (Queen Anne's incumbent) | 7,214 | 36.8 |
| Republican | Michael D. Smigiel Sr. (Cecil, incumbent) | 4,817 | 24.6 |
| Republican | Mary Roe Walkup (Kent, incumbent) | 4,604 | 23.5 |
| Republican | Jay A. Jacobs (Kent) | 2,956 | 15.1 |

==== Democratic primary ====
Maryland House of Delegates District 36 Democratic primary election, 2006
| Party | Candidate | Votes | % |
|---|---|---|---|
| Democratic | Mark Guns (Cecil) | 7,091 | 28.9 |
| Democratic | Wheeler R. Baker (Queen Anne's) | 5,309 | 21.6 |
| Democratic | Joan O. Horsey (Kent) | 4,647 | 18.9 |
| Democratic | Randall Bellows (Kent) | 3,822 | 15.6 |
| Democratic | Robert Glenn Babbitt (Queen Anne's) | 3,708 | 15.1 |

==== General election ====
Maryland House of Delegates District 36 election, 2006
| Party | Candidate | Votes | % |
|---|---|---|---|
| Republican | Richard A. Sossi (Queen Anne's incumbent) | 19,450 | 22.3 |
| Republican | Mary Roe Walkup (Kent, incumbent) | 19,430 | 22.3 |
| Republican | Michael D. Smigiel Sr. (Cecil, incumbent) | 17,764 | 20.3 |
| Democratic | Wheeler R. Baker (Queen Anne's) | 16,950 | 19.4 |
| Democratic | Mark Guns (Cecil) | 15,475 | 17.7 |
| Democratic | Joan O. Horsey (Kent) | 13,498 | 15.5 |
| Green | Joseph Sanchez (Caroline) | 4,137 | 4.7 |
| Write-in | | 41 | 0.0 |
| Republican hold | | | |
| Republican hold | | | |
| Republican hold | | | |

=== District 37A ===
==== Democratic primary ====
Maryland House of Delegates District 37A Democratic primary election, 2006
| Party | Candidate | Votes | % |
|---|---|---|---|
| Democratic | Rudolph C. Cane (incumbent) | 2,177 | 68.7 |
| Democratic | Charles Cephas Sr. | 992 | 31.3 |

==== General election ====
Maryland House of Delegates District 37A election, 2006
| Party | Candidate | Votes | % |
|---|---|---|---|
| Democratic | Rudolph C. Cane (incumbent) | 7,405 | 98.7 |
| Write-in | | 95 | 1.3 |
| Democratic hold | | | |

=== District 37B ===
==== Republican primary ====
Maryland House of Delegates District 37B Republican primary election, 2006
| Party | Candidate | Votes | % |
|---|---|---|---|
| Republican | Jeannie Haddaway-Riccio (incumbent) | 6,120 | 46.0 |
| Republican | Adelaide C. Eckardt (incumbent) | 6,047 | 45.4 |
| Republican | Redgie S. Lancaster | 1,145 | 8.6 |

==== Democratic primary ====
Maryland House of Delegates District 37B Democratic primary election, 2006
| Party | Candidate | Votes | % |
|---|---|---|---|
| Democratic | James A. Adkins | 3,979 | 44.6 |
| Democratic | Tim Quinn | 3,720 | 41.7 |
| Democratic | Robert Cheek | 1,225 | 13.7 |

==== General election ====
Maryland House of Delegates District 37B election, 2006
| Party | Candidate | Votes | % |
|---|---|---|---|
| Republican | Adelaide C. Eckardt (incumbent) | 19,980 | 34.5 |
| Republican | Jeannie Haddaway-Riccio (incumbent) | 18,677 | 32.2 |
| Democratic | James A. Adkins | 9,640 | 16.6 |
| Democratic | Tim Quinn | 9,588 | 16.6 |
| Write-in | | 34 | 0.1 |
| Republican hold | | | |
| Republican hold | | | |

=== District 38A ===
==== Democratic primary ====
Maryland House of Delegates District 38A Democratic primary election, 2006
| Party | Candidate | Votes | % |
|---|---|---|---|
| Democratic | Patrick M. Armstrong | 1,681 | 59.4 |
| Democratic | Tony Bruce | 1,150 | 40.6 |

==== General election ====
Maryland House of Delegates District 38A election, 2006
| Party | Candidate | Votes | % |
|---|---|---|---|
| Republican | D. Page Elmore (incumbent) | 8,030 | 63.3 |
| Democratic | Patrick M. Armstrong | 4,652 | 36.6 |
| Write-in | | 12 | 0.1 |
| Republican hold | | | |

=== District 38B ===
==== Republican primary ====
Maryland House of Delegates District 38B Republican primary election, 2006
| Party | Candidate | Votes | % |
|---|---|---|---|
| Republican | Michael J. James | 3,300 | 30.8 |
| Republican | Bonnie Nelson Luna | 2,884 | 26.9 |
| Republican | John E. Bloxom | 2,656 | 24.8 |
| Republican | Jack Lord | 1,256 | 11.7 |
| Republican | Bill McDermott | 635 | 5.9 |

==== General election ====
Maryland House of Delegates District 38B election, 2006
| Party | Candidate | Votes | % |
|---|---|---|---|
| Democratic | James N. Mathias Jr. (incumbent) | 15,082 | 26.6 |
| Democratic | Norman Conway (incumbent) | 14,223 | 25.1 |
| Republican | Michael J. James | 13,969 | 24.6 |
| Republican | Bonnie Nelson Luna | 13,469 | 23.7 |
| Write-in | | 24 | 0.0 |
| Democratic hold | | | |
| Democratic hold | | | |

=== District 39 ===
==== Democratic primary ====
Maryland House of Delegates District 39 Democratic primary election, 2006
| Party | Candidate | Votes | % |
|---|---|---|---|
| Democratic | Nancy J. King (incumbent) | 4,758 | 25.4 |
| Democratic | Charles E. Barkley (incumbent) | 4,758 | 25.4 |
| Democratic | Saqib Ali | 4,758 | 25.4 |
| Democratic | Joan F. Stern (incumbent) | 4,758 | 25.4 |

==== General election ====
Maryland House of Delegates District 39 election, 2006
| Party | Candidate | Votes | % |
|---|---|---|---|
| Democratic | Nancy J. King (incumbent) | 18,651 | 23.5 |
| Democratic | Charles E. Barkley (incumbent) | 18,253 | 23.0 |
| Democratic | Saqib Ali | 16,455 | 20.7 |
| Republican | David Nichols | 9,278 | 11.7 |
| Republican | Gary Scott | 8,363 | 10.5 |
| Republican | Bill Witham | 8,244 | 10.4 |
| Write-in | | 68 | 0.1 |
| Democratic hold | | | |
| Democratic hold | | | |
| Democratic hold | | | |

=== District 40 ===
==== Democratic primary ====
Maryland House of Delegates District 40 Democratic primary election, 2006
| Party | Candidate | Votes | % |
|---|---|---|---|
| Democratic | Frank M. Conaway Jr. | 5,889 | 21.0 |
| Democratic | Barbara A. Robinson (incumbent) | 5,889 | 21.0 |
| Democratic | Shawn Z. Tarrant | 4,126 | 14.7 |
| Democratic | Antonio Hayes | 4,046 | 14.4 |
| Democratic | Marshall T. Goodwin (incumbent) | 3,031 | 10.8 |
| Democratic | Nolan Rollins | 2,181 | 7.8 |
| Democratic | Mark E. Hughes | 2,151 | 7.7 |
| Democratic | Sarah Louise Matthews | 1,336 | 4.8 |
| Democratic | Kinji Pierre Scott | 685 | 2.4 |

==== General election ====
Maryland House of Delegates District 40 election, 2006
| Party | Candidate | Votes | % |
|---|---|---|---|
| Democratic | Frank M. Conaway Jr. | 16,432 | 32.4 |
| Democratic | Barbara A. Robinson (incumbent) | 16,032 | 31.6 |
| Democratic | Shawn Z. Tarrant | 13,921 | 27.5 |
| Green | Jan E. Danworth | 4,135 | 8.2 |
| Write-in | | 177 | 0.3 |
| Democratic hold | | | |
| Democratic hold | | | |
| Democratic hold | | | |

=== District 41 ===
==== Democratic primary ====
Maryland House of Delegates District 41 Democratic primary election, 2006
| Party | Candidate | Votes | % |
|---|---|---|---|
| Democratic | Jill P. Carter (incumbent) | 13,196 | 31.2 |
| Democratic | Samuel I. Rosenberg (incumbent) | 9,215 | 21.8 |
| Democratic | Nathaniel T. Oaks (incumbent) | 9,189 | 21.7 |
| Democratic | Wendell F. Phillips | 6,480 | 15.3 |
| Democratic | Kevin Hargrave | 2,116 | 5.0 |
| Democratic | Karen M. Ferguson | 2,095 | 5.0 |

==== General election ====
Maryland House of Delegates District 41 election, 2006
| Party | Candidate | Votes | % |
|---|---|---|---|
| Democratic | Jill P. Carter (incumbent) | 24,189 | 33.7 |
| Democratic | Samuel I. Rosenberg (incumbent) | 21,751 | 30.3 |
| Democratic | Nathaniel T. Oaks (incumbent) | 20,570 | 28.6 |
| Republican | Tony Asa | 5,166 | 7.2 |
| Write-in | | 129 | 0.2 |
| Democratic hold | | | |
| Democratic hold | | | |
| Democratic hold | | | |

=== District 42 ===
==== Republican primary ====
Maryland House of Delegates District 42 Republican primary election, 2006
| Party | Candidate | Votes | % |
|---|---|---|---|
| Republican | Susan L. M. Aumann (incumbent) | 4,038 | 25.3 |
| Republican | William J. Frank (incumbent) | 3,557 | 22.3 |
| Republican | Dilip Paliath | 3,107 | 19.5 |
| Republican | Russell J. Pope | 2,080 | 13.0 |
| Republican | Ryan Shafik | 1,468 | 9.2 |
| Republican | Lynn Sklar | 817 | 5.1 |
| Republican | Scott Williams | 467 | 2.9 |
| Republican | Steve Rosasco | 422 | 2.6 |

==== Democratic primary ====
Maryland House of Delegates District 42 Democratic primary election, 2006
| Party | Candidate | Votes | % |
|---|---|---|---|
| Democratic | Stephen W. Lafferty | 8,903 | 32.4 |
| Democratic | Tracy Miller | 7,914 | 28.8 |
| Democratic | Andrew Belt | 6,397 | 23.3 |
| Democratic | Bernard J. Hayden Jr. | 4,233 | 15.4 |

==== General election ====
Maryland House of Delegates District 42 election, 2006
| Party | Candidate | Votes | % |
|---|---|---|---|
| Republican | Susan L. M. Aumann (incumbent) | 22,054 | 18.3 |
| Democratic | Stephen W. Lafferty | 21,117 | 17.5 |
| Republican | William J. Frank (incumbent) | 20,522 | 17.0 |
| Republican | Dilip Paliath | 19,490 | 16.2 |
| Democratic | Tracy Miller | 19,168 | 15.9 |
| Democratic | Andrew Belt | 18,006 | 14.9 |
| Write-in | | 88 | 0.1 |
| Democratic gain from Republican | | | |
| Republican hold | | | |
| Republican hold | | | |

=== District 43 ===
==== Democratic primary ====
Maryland House of Delegates District 43 Democratic primary election, 2006
| Party | Candidate | Votes | % |
|---|---|---|---|
| Democratic | Curt Anderson (incumbent) | 10,390 | 25.8 |
| Democratic | Maggie McIntosh (incumbent) | 9,540 | 23.7 |
| Democratic | Ann Marie Doory (incumbent) | 8,726 | 21.6 |
| Democratic | Mary L. Washington | 7,347 | 18.2 |
| Democratic | Michael V. Dobson | 3,074 | 7.6 |
| Democratic | Mike Miller | 1,230 | 3.1 |

==== General election ====
Maryland House of Delegates District 43 election, 2006
| Party | Candidate | Votes | % |
|---|---|---|---|
| Democratic | Curt Anderson (incumbent) | 22,315 | 29.4 |
| Democratic | Maggie McIntosh (incumbent) | 22,093 | 29.1 |
| Democratic | Ann Marie Doory (incumbent) | 21,219 | 28.0 |
| Republican | Armand F. Girard | 3,425 | 4.5 |
| Green | David G. S. Greene | 2,619 | 3.5 |
| Green | Brandy Baker | 2,267 | 3.0 |
| Green | Richard J. Ochs | 1,772 | 2.3 |
| Write-in | | 85 | 0.1 |
| Democratic hold | | | |
| Democratic hold | | | |
| Democratic hold | | | |

=== District 44 ===
==== Democratic primary ====
Maryland House of Delegates District 44 Democratic primary election, 2006
| Party | Candidate | Votes | % |
|---|---|---|---|
| Democratic | Melvin L. Stukes | 4,949 | 21.8 |
| Democratic | Ruth M. Kirk (incumbent) | 4,345 | 19.1 |
| Democratic | Keith E. Haynes (incumbent) | 4,234 | 18.6 |
| Democratic | Jeffrey A. Paige (incumbent) | 2,515 | 11.1 |
| Democratic | Arlene B. Fisher | 1,837 | 8.1 |
| Democratic | Anthony McCarthy | 1,806 | 8.0 |
| Democratic | Wesley Wood | 1,473 | 6.5 |
| Democratic | Steven E. Gilliard | 580 | 2.6 |
| Democratic | Richard M. Parker | 500 | 2.2 |
| Democratic | Tavon Nathaniel Pope | 475 | 2.1 |

==== General election ====
Maryland House of Delegates District 44 election, 2006
| Party | Candidate | Votes | % |
|---|---|---|---|
| Democratic | Jeffrey A. Paige (incumbent) | 13,173 | 34.0 |
| Democratic | Ruth M. Kirk (incumbent) | 12,894 | 33.3 |
| Democratic | Keith E. Haynes (incumbent) | 12,565 | 32.4 |
| Write-in | | 129 | 0.3 |
| Democratic hold | | | |
| Democratic hold | | | |
| Democratic hold | | | |

=== District 45 ===
==== Democratic primary ====
Maryland House of Delegates District 45 Democratic primary election, 2006
| Party | Candidate | Votes | % |
|---|---|---|---|
| Democratic | Talmadge Branch (incumbent) | 7,206 | 24.7 |
| Democratic | Cheryl Glenn | 6,650 | 22.8 |
| Democratic | Hattie N. Harrison (incumbent) | 5,730 | 19.6 |
| Democratic | Robert R. Stokes | 5,166 | 17.7 |
| Democratic | Kevin W. Parson | 1,823 | 6.2 |
| Democratic | Kevin Slayton | 1,677 | 5.7 |
| Democratic | Aaron Keith Wilkes | 921 | 3.2 |

==== General election ====
Maryland House of Delegates District 45 election, 2006
| Party | Candidate | Votes | % |
|---|---|---|---|
| Democratic | Cheryl Glenn | 16,911 | 32.6 |
| Democratic | Hattie N. Harrison (incumbent) | 16,084 | 31.0 |
| Democratic | Talmadge Branch (incumbent) | 16,014 | 30.9 |
| Populist | Ronald M. Owens-Bey | 2,727 | 5.3 |
| Write-in | | 111 | 0.2 |
| Democratic hold | | | |
| Democratic hold | | | |
| Democratic hold | | | |

=== District 46 ===
==== Democratic primary ====
Maryland House of Delegates District 46 Democratic primary election, 2006
| Party | Candidate | Votes | % |
|---|---|---|---|
| Democratic | Peter A. Hammen (incumbent) | 6,196 | 28.7 |
| Democratic | Carolyn Krysiak (incumbent) | 5,501 | 25.5 |
| Democratic | Brian K. McHale (incumbent) | 5,413 | 25.1 |
| Democratic | Mike Mitchell | 3,732 | 17.3 |
| Democratic | Donald Nygard | 745 | 3.5 |

==== General election ====
Maryland House of Delegates District 46 election, 2006
| Party | Candidate | Votes | % |
|---|---|---|---|
| Democratic | Peter A. Hammen (incumbent) | 15,883 | 29.6 |
| Democratic | Carolyn Krysiak (incumbent) | 15,856 | 29.6 |
| Democratic | Brian K. McHale (incumbent) | 15,542 | 29.0 |
| Republican | Peter Kimos | 6,219 | 11.6 |
| Write-in | | 154 | 0.3 |
| Democratic hold | | | |
| Democratic hold | | | |
| Democratic hold | | | |

=== District 47 ===
==== Democratic primary ====
Maryland House of Delegates District 47 Democratic primary election, 2006
| Party | Candidate | Votes | % |
|---|---|---|---|
| Democratic | Victor R. Ramirez (incumbent) | 5,797 | 31.3 |
| Democratic | Jolene Ivey | 5,653 | 30.5 |
| Democratic | Doyle Niemann (incumbent) | 3,881 | 20.9 |
| Democratic | Rosetta C. Parker (incumbent) | 3,209 | 17.3 |

==== General election ====
Maryland House of Delegates District 47 election, 2006
| Party | Candidate | Votes | % |
|---|---|---|---|
| Democratic | Jolene Ivey | 12,860 | 35.3 |
| Democratic | Victor R. Ramirez (incumbent) | 12,231 | 33.6 |
| Democratic | Doyle Niemann (incumbent) | 11,229 | 30.8 |
| Write-in | | 120 | 0.3 |
| Democratic hold | | | |
| Democratic hold | | | |
| Democratic hold | | | |
