= Pamela Beidle =

American politician (born 1951)

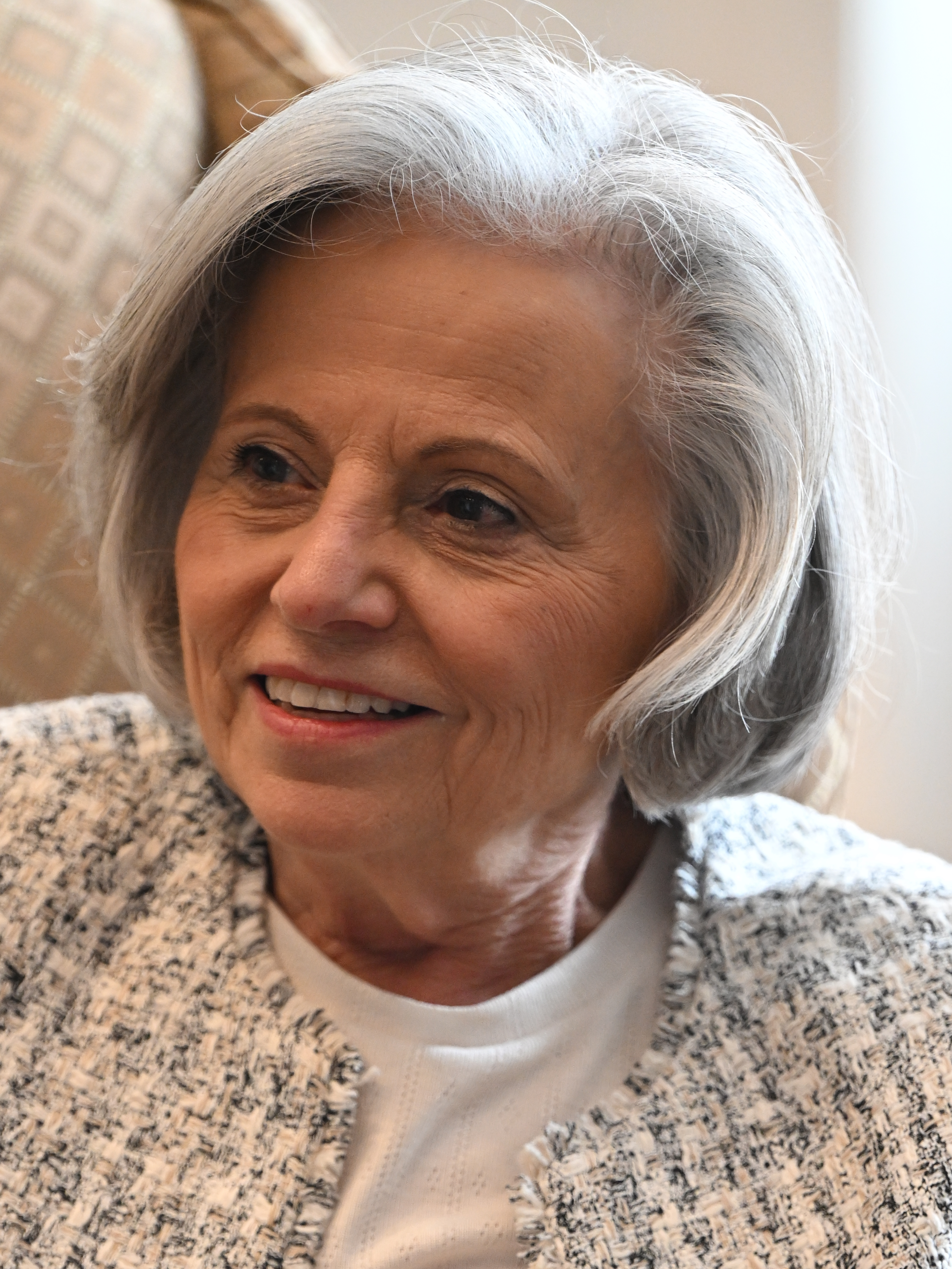
- Beidle in 2026

Member of the Maryland Senate from the 32nd district
- Incumbent
- Assumed office January 9, 2019
- Preceded by: James E. DeGrange Sr.

Member of the Maryland House of Delegates from the 32nd district
- In office January 10, 2007 – January 9, 2019
- Preceded by: Terry R. Gilleland Jr.
- Succeeded by: Mike Rogers; J. Sandy Bartlett

Personal details
- Born: July 21, 1951 (age 75) Baltimore, Maryland, U.S.
- Party: Democratic
- Spouse: Len
- Children: 3
- Education: Anne Arundel Community College (AA); Towson University (BA)
- Website: Campaign website

Pamela Graboski Beidle (born July 21, 1951) is an American politician who has served as a member of the Maryland Senate from District 32 since 2019. A member of the Democratic Party, she previously represented the district in the Maryland House of Delegates from 2007 to 2019, and was a member of the Anne Arundel County Council from 1998 to 2006.

Born in Baltimore and raised in Anne Arundel County, Maryland, Beidle graduated from Anne Arundel Community College and Towson University, afterwards starting her own insurance company. She was elected to the Anne Arundel County Council in 1998 and 2002. She was elected to the Maryland House of Delegates in 2006, and subsequently re-elected in 2010 and 2014, and was elected to the Maryland Senate in 2018 and 2022. During her tenure, she served as the chair of the Executive Nominations Committee and the Finance Committee.

== Early life and education ==
Beidle was born in Baltimore. She graduated from Archbishop Spalding High School and later attended Anne Arundel Community College, earning her associate degree in business in 1977, and Towson University, where she earned her Bachelor of Science degree magna cum laude in business administration in 1994.

== Career ==
After graduating from AACC, Beidle started her own insurance company, Beidle Insurance Agency, which she ran with her husband until 2017. She was also a member of the Northern Anne Arundel Chamber of Commerce and the National Association of Life Underwriters, and served on the boards of Leadership Anne Arundel and Hospice of the Chesapeake.

In 1998, Beidle won election to the Anne Arundel County Council in District 1, succeeding term-limited councilmember George F. Bachman Jr. She was sworn in December 1998, and served until December 4, 2006.

== Maryland General Assembly ==
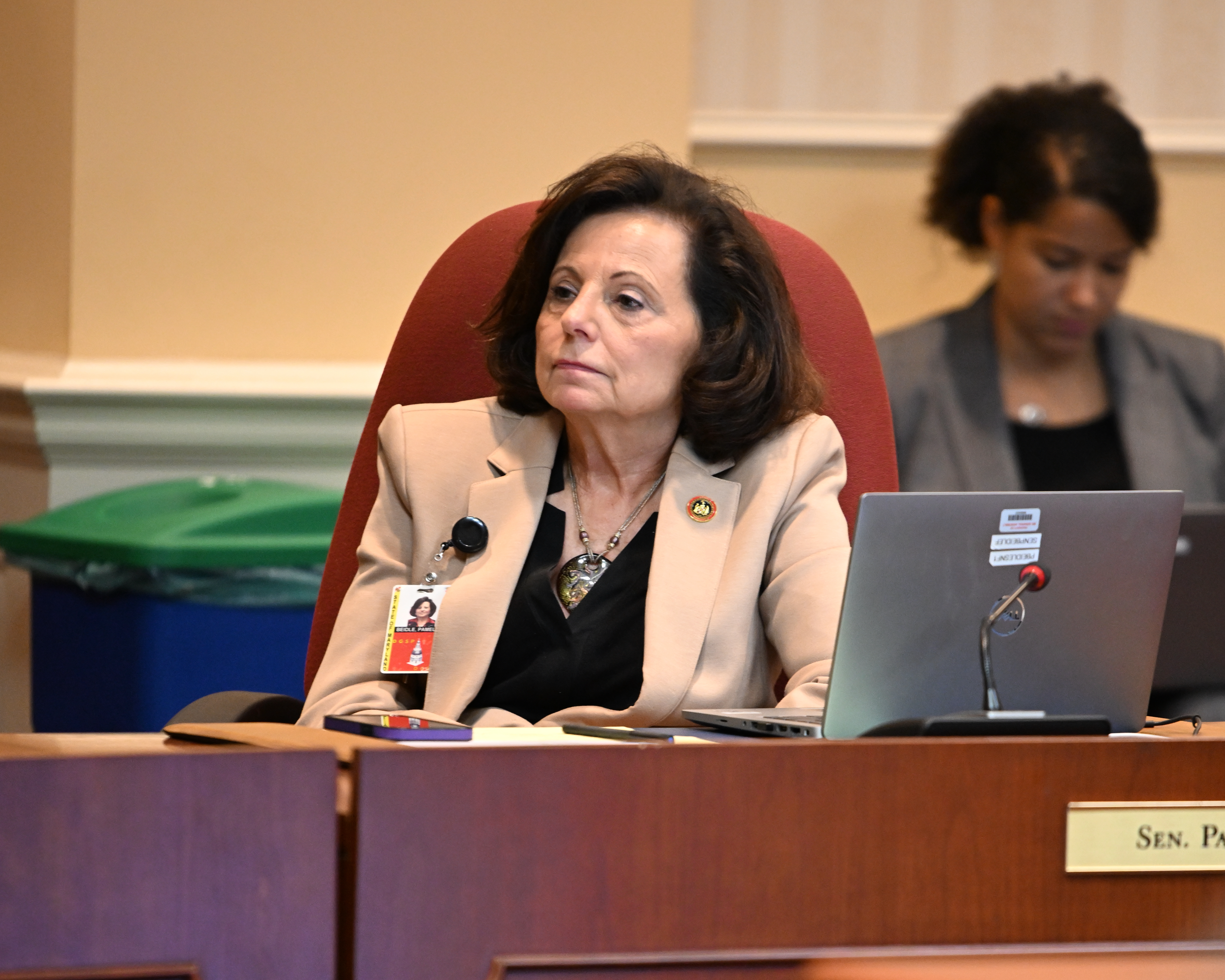
Beidle in the Senate Finance Committee, 2023

Beidle was sworn into the Maryland House of Delegates on January 10, 2007. She was a member of the Environmental Matters Committee (later renamed to the Environment and Transportation Committee) during her entire tenure.

In August 2017, Beidle filed to run for the Maryland Senate in District 32 in 2018, seeking to succeed retiring state senator James E. DeGrange Sr., who had encouraged her to run. The district was targeted by the Maryland Republican Party in its "Fight for Five" campaign in 2018. After running unopposed in the primary election, Beidle faced Republican county councilmember John Grasso in the general election, whom she defeated with 66.4 percent of the vote. Maryland Matters compared the general election to the 2016 United States presidential election, noting that Beidle was deep-rooted in local politics while Grasso had comparatively less political experience, held politically partisan views, and was known for making controversial Facebook posts.

Beidle was sworn into the Maryland Senate on January 9, 2019. She was a member of the Executive Nominations Committee and the Finance Committee during her entire tenure. In December 2022, Senate President Bill Ferguson appointed Beidle as the chair of the Executive Nominations Committee, a position she gave up to become the chair of the Finance Committee following the resignation of Melony G. Griffith in October 2023.

In February 2026, hours before the candidate filing deadline, Beidle announced that she would not run for re-election in 2026, endorsing state delegate Mark S. Chang to succeed her.

== Political positions ==
=== Education ===
During the 2017 legislative session, Beidle introduced legislation to create an elected school board in Anne Arundel County. The bill passed and became law.

During debate on the Blueprint for Maryland's Future in 2019, Beidle expressed concern with the education reform bill's Concentration of Poverty Grants, which provided extra funds to schools with high populations of students that receive free or reduced-price lunches, saying that she wanted the percentage floor required to receive the grants to be lowered.

=== Environment ===
During the 2021 legislative session, Beidle introduced a bill that would require the state to switch to safer alternatives in firefighting foam and ban PFAS chemicals in food packaging.

=== Gun policy ===
During the 2013 legislative session, Beidle was one of 18 Democratic state delegates to vote against the Firearm Safety Act of 2013, a bill that placed restrictions on firearm purchases and magazine capacity in semi-automatic rifles.

During the 2019 legislative session, Beidle introduced legislation to repeal of the state's Handgun Permit Review Board, which handled concealed carry applications. The bill passed, but was vetoed by Governor Larry Hogan; the legislature overrode Hogan's veto during the 2020 legislative session. She also voted against Hogan's appointments to the board, claiming that there was "too much secrecy" surrounding the board's decisions.

=== Health care ===
In 2019, Beidle voted against the End-of-Life Option Act, which would have provided palliative care to terminally ill adults.

During the 2022 legislative session, Beidle introduced legislation to prohibit health care companies from raising prices on "essential goods or services" by more than 10 percent during a state of emergency. She also introduced a bill requiring Maryland to stay in the Interstate Medical Licensure Compact for an additional eight years, which passed and was signed into law by Governor Larry Hogan.

In April 2022, Beidle spoke in support of legislation to provide paid sick leave, recalling when her business continued to pay a worker who took off after she and her mother were diagnosed with cancer.

In December 2025, Beidle opposed the One Big Beautiful Bill Act, saying that the bill would cause people to lose their health insurance and contribute to overcrowding at the state's hospitals.

=== Immigration ===
In January 2026, following a series of U.S. Immigration and Customs Enforcement activities in Annapolis, Beidle expressed concern with the training and tactics used by ICE officers. During the 2026 legislative session, she supported a bill to ban law enforcement agencies from wearing face coverings while on duty in Maryland.

=== Minimum wage ===
During the 2014 legislative session, Beidle voted against legislation to raise the state's minimum wage to $10.10 an hour by 2017.

=== Policing ===
During the 2021 legislative session, Beidle expressed concerns with the Maryland Police Accountability Act, also known as Anton's Law, especially with provisions to repeal the state's Law Enforcement Officers' Bill of Rights, and introduced an amendment to the bill to remove "unfounded and unsubstantiated complaints" from records that could be obtained under the Maryland Public Information Act. The amendment was rejected by the Maryland Senate in a 21-26 vote.

=== Social issues ===
In 2012, Beidle voted for the Civil Marriage Protection Act, which legalized same-sex marriage in Maryland.

During the 2021 legislative session, Beidle supported legislation to decriminalize the possession of drug paraphernalia.

=== Taxes ===
During the 2013 legislative session, Beidle voted against a bill to index the state's gas tax to inflation to pay for transportation projects. In March 2023, she was one of five Democrats to vote for an amendment that would have repealed this bill.

During the 2022 legislative session, Beidle supported legislation to extend the state's tax on health insurance companies.

=== Transportation ===
In June 2002, Beidle said she opposed a proposal to build a maglev line between Baltimore and Washington, D.C. In April 2022, she introduced legislation that would make it more expensive for the Baltimore-Washington Rapid Rail company to build the maglev line by requiring it to pay 25 percent of costs associated with acquiring land through condemnation to the jurisdiction where the land is located.

In 2016, Beidle introduced legislation that would require the Maryland Department of Transportation to use a scoring system to determine which state transportation projects to fund. The bill passed, but was vetoed by Governor Larry Hogan; legislators overrode his veto later that year.

During the 2020 legislative session, Beidle supported legislation to add citizen members to the state's Chesapeake Bay Bridge Reconstruction Advisory Group.

== Personal life ==
Beidle is married to her husband Len. Together, they have three children.

== Electoral history ==
Anne Arundel County Council District 1 Democratic primary election, 1998
Party	Candidate	Votes	%
Democratic	Pamela Beidle	4,193	63.6
Democratic	Gerald M. Wagner	2,396	36.4

Anne Arundel County Council District 1 election, 1998
Party	Candidate	Votes	%
Democratic	Pamela Beidle	11,811	64.7
Republican	Gerald P. Starr	6,420	35.2
Write-in		21	0.1

Anne Arundel County Council District 1 election, 2002
Party	Candidate	Votes	%
Democratic	Pamela Beidle (incumbent)	12,465	64.8
Republican	Bob Gouge	6,760	35.2

Maryland House of Delegates District 32 Democratic primary election, 2006
Party	Candidate	Votes	%
Democratic	Mary Ann Love (incumbent)	8,035	33.8
Democratic	Theodore Sophocleus (incumbent)	7,960	33.5
Democratic	Pamela Beidle	7,745	32.6

Maryland House of Delegates District 32 election, 2006
Party	Candidate	Votes	%
Democratic	Pamela Beidle	17,964	18.6
Democratic	Mary Ann Love (incumbent)	17,697	18.3
Democratic	Theodore Sophocleus (incumbent)	17,661	18.3
Republican	Mark S. Chang	16,569	17.1
Republican	Terry R. Gilleland Jr. (incumbent)	13,632	14.1
Republican	Wayne Charles Smith	13,153	13.6
Write-in		75	0.1

Maryland House of Delegates District 32 election, 2010
Party	Candidate	Votes	%
Democratic	Pamela Beidle (incumbent)	20,409	19.0
Democratic	Theodore Sophocleus (incumbent)	18,947	17.7
Democratic	Mary Ann Love (incumbent)	18,830	17.6
Republican	Stephanie A. Hodges	17,477	16.3
Republican	Wayne Smith	16,865	15.7
Republican	David P. Starr	14,582	13.6
Write-in		123	0.1

Maryland House of Delegates District 32 election, 2014
Party	Candidate	Votes	%
Democratic	Pamela Beidle (incumbent)	17,120	20.0
Democratic	Mark S. Chang	15,904	18.6
Democratic	Theodore J. Sophocleus (incumbent)	14,995	17.5
Republican	Tim Walters	13,066	15.3
Republican	Mark Angell	12,327	14.4
Republican	Joseph Fioravante	12,012	14.0
Write-in		85	0.1

Maryland Senate District 32 Democratic primary election, 2018
Party	Candidate	Votes	%
Democratic	Pamela Beidle	7,383	100.0

Maryland Senate District 32 election, 2018
Party	Candidate	Votes	%
Democratic	Pamela Beidle	30,384	66.4
Republican	John Grasso	15,306	33.4
Write-in		70	0.2

Maryland Senate District 32 election, 2022
Party	Candidate	Votes	%
Democratic	Pamela Beidle (incumbent)	23,380	65.8
Republican	Kimberly Ann June	12,103	34.0
Write-in		76	0.2
