= 2006 Maryland General Assembly election =

2006 Maryland General Assembly election may refer to:

- 2006 Maryland Senate election
- 2006 Maryland House of Delegates election
