= James G. Crouse =

American politician (1945–2022)

Member of the Maryland House of Delegates from the 36th district
- In office August 7, 2001 – January 8, 2003
- Preceded by: Ronald A. Guns
- Succeeded by: Michael D. Smigiel, Sr.

38th Mayor of Elkton, Maryland
- In office June 1978 – June 1998
- Preceded by: Paul C. Dennis
- Succeeded by: Robert J. Alt

Personal details
- Born: James George Crouse; April 17, 1945 Mayfield, Kentucky, U.S.
- Died: April 16, 2022 (aged 76) Elkton, Maryland, U.S.
- Party: Democratic
- Education: La Salle University

Military service
- Allegiance: United States
- Branch/service: United States Army
- Years of service: 1963-1969
- Unit: Maryland Army National Guard

James G. Crouse (April 17, 1945 – April 16, 2022) was an American politician and member of the Maryland House of Delegates from 2001 until his retirement in 2003, Prior to serving in the Maryland House of Delegates, Crouse served as the 38th Mayor of Elkton, Maryland from 1978 to 1998.

== Early life ==
James George Crouse was born in Mayfield, Kentucky, on April 17, 1945. He was the son of Herman and Dorothy Marinkovich Crouse.

Later life and death:

After his tenure as Mayor of Elkton, Crouse served as a member of the State of Maryland House of Delegates as a Democrat for District 36 from 2001 to 2003. During this time, he served on the Commerce and Government Matters Committee and on the Ethics and Election Laws subcommittee. He retired from the State of Maryland House of Delegates in 2003

Crouse died surrounded by family on April 16, 2022, one day prior to his 77th birthday. Crouse was interred at Gilpin Manor Memorial Park in Elkton, Maryland.
