= James E. Rzepkowski =

American politician

Delegate Maryland District 32
- In office January 11, 1995 – April 30, 2003
- Preceded by: Tyras S. Athey, Patrick C. Scannello, & Victor A. Sulin
- Succeeded by: Terry R. Gilleland, Jr.

Associate Deputy Secretary for Business and Economic Development for Business Development-Rural Region, Department of Business and Economic Development
- In office May 2004 – June 2004

Assistant Secretary for Business and Economic Development for Business Development-Rural Region, Department of Business and Economic Development
- In office June 2004 – February 2007

Assistant Secretary of Business and Economic Development for Workforce Development & Adult Learning
- Incumbent
- Assumed office 2015
- Governor: Larry Hogan

Personal details
- Born: March 8, 1971 (age 55) Annapolis, MD
- Party: Republican

James E. Rzepkowski (born March 8, 1971, in Annapolis, Maryland) was a member of the Maryland House of Delegates.

== Education ==
Rzepkowski graduated from Old Mill High School in Millersville, Maryland, in Anne Arundel County. He attended the University of Maryland College Park, where he received his B.A. in government and politics in 1993 and was inducted into Phi Beta Kappa. He was also charter president of the Eta Epsilon chapter of Pi Kappa Phi fraternity.

Rzepkowski worked as an insurance agent manager for State Farm.

== Political career ==
In 1992, Rzepkowski began his political career when he worked for the Republican State Central Committee.

He first won election in 1994, defeating Democratic incumbent Victor A. Sulin to represent District 32 in the Maryland House of Delegates. He was reelected in 1998 and 2002. He served as the Chief Deputy Minority Whip in the 2003 legislative session.

Rzepkowski resigned his seat on April 30, 2003, to take a job with the state's Department of Business and Economic Development. Governor Bob Ehrlich appointed Terry R. Gilleland, Jr. as his replacement.

== Election results ==
- 2002 Race for Maryland House of Delegates – District 32

Voters to choose three:

Name	Votes	Percent	Outcome
James E. Rzepkowski, Rep.	18,299	19.84%	Won
Theodore Sophocleus, Dem.	16,842	18.26%	Won
Mary Ann Love, Dem.	16,646	18.05%	Won
Robert G. Pepersack, Sr, Rep.	14,628	15.86%	Lost
Victor A. Sulin, Dem.	13,694	14.85%	Lost
David P. Starr, Rep.	12,020	13.04%	Lost
Other Write-Ins	82	0.09%	Lost

- 1998 Race for Maryland House of Delegates – District 32

Voters to choose three:

Name	Votes	Percent	Outcome
Mary Ann Love, Dem.	15,823	19%	Won
Theodore Sophocleus, Dem.	15,382	18%	Won
James E. Rzepkowski, Rep.	14,959	18%	Won
Michael W. Burns, Rep.	13,247	16%	Lost
Victor Sulin, Dem.	12,658	15%	Lost
Betty Ann O'Neill, Dem.	11,752	14%	Lost

- 1994 Race for Maryland House of Delegates – District 32

Voters to choose three:

Name	Votes	Percent	Outcome
James E. Rzepkowski, Rep.	15,147	20%	Won
Michael W. Burns, Rep.	12,883	17%	Won
Mary Ann Love, Dem.	12,414	16%	Won
Gerald P. Starr, Rep.	12,166	16%	Lost
Victor A. Sulin, Dem.	11,872	16%	Lost
Thomas H. Dixon III, Dem.	11,002	15%	Lost
