= Michael W. Burns =

American politician (born 1958)

Member of the Maryland House of Delegates from District 32
- In office January 11, 1995 – 1999
- Preceded by: Tyras S. Athey, Patrick C. Scannello, and Victor A. Sulin
- Succeeded by: Theodore J. Sophocleus

Personal details
- Born: February 16, 1958 (age 68) Baltimore, Maryland
- Party: Republican
- Education: Towson University (BS); University of Maryland School of Law (JD)
- Profession: Lawyer, politician
- Website: Official website

Michael W. Burns (born February 16, 1958) is an American legislator who served as a member of the Maryland House of Delegates for District 32, which covers a portion of Anne Arundel County, Maryland.

== Background ==
In 1994, Michael Burns won election as one of the three delegates for District 32 in the Maryland House of Delegates. In that year, only one of the incumbents ran, one Victor A. Sulin, who was defeated. The other two incumbents, Patrick C. Scannello and Theodore J. Sophocleus did not run again. (Sophecleus had replaced a previous delegate, Tyras S. Athey, when he resigned to become Secretary of State of Maryland).

In 1998, Michael Burns ran for reelection, and was defeated. Democrat Mary Ann Love and Republican James E. Rzepkowski were both reelected, but Sophecleus finally ran for election and won.

== Education ==
Burns graduated from Towson State University in 1980 as magna cum laude with a B.S. in History. He returned to college, this time to the University of Maryland School of Law, graduating with his J.D. with honors in 1983.

== Career ==
After being admitted to the Maryland Bar in 1983, Burns began to work as a law clerk in the Baltimore City Circuit Court, where he worked until 1984.

In 1987, Burns was the Maryland Executive Director for the campaign of Senator Robert Dole for President. After the election he became the Executive Director for the Maryland Republican Party. Burns was a delegate to the Republican Party National Convention in 1988 and again in 1996.

Maryland Governor Robert Ehrlich appointed Burns to the Chair of the Maryland State Board of Contract Appeals in 2003, which Burns will hold for 5 years, until 2009.

== Election results ==
- 1998 Race for Maryland House of Delegates – District 32

Voters to choose three:

Name	Votes	Percent	Outcome
Mary Ann Love, Dem.	15,823	19%	Won
Theodore Sophocleus, Dem.	15,382	18%	Won
James E. Rzepkowski, Rep.	14,959	18%	Won
Michael W. Burns, Rep.	13,247	16%	Lost
Victor Sulin, Dem.	12,658	15%	Lost
Betty Ann O'Neill, Dem.	11,752	14%	Lost

- 1994 Race for Maryland House of Delegates – District 32

Voters to choose three:

Name	Votes	Percent	Outcome
James E. Rzepkowski, Rep.	15,147	20%	Won
Michael W. Burns, Rep.	12,883	17%	Won
Mary Ann Love, Dem.	12,414	16%	Won
Gerald P. Starr, Rep.	12,166	16%	Lost
Victor A. Sulin, Dem.	11,872	16%	Lost
Thomas H. Dixon III, Dem.	11,002	15%	Lost
