= Terry R. Gilleland Jr. =

American politician (born 1977)

Delegate Maryland District 32
- In office May 20, 2003 – January 10, 2007
- Preceded by: James E. Rzepkowski
- Succeeded by: Pamela Beidle

Personal details
- Born: April 11, 1977 (age 49) Baltimore, Maryland, U.S.
- Party: Republican
- Education: Loyola College of Maryland (BA); University of Baltimore (MBA)

Terrill R. Gilleland Jr. (born April 11, 1977) is an American politician who was a member of the Maryland House of Delegates. He was also a member of the Anne Arundel County Board of Education.

== Education ==
Gilleland attended North County High School in Glen Burnie, Maryland. He graduated from Loyola College in 1999 with a B.A. in political science. He continued his education by getting his M.B.A. in finance from the University of Baltimore in 2001.

== Career ==
Gilleland unsuccessfully challenged Democratic incumbent Ed DeGrange for a State Senate Seat in 2002, taking 41% of the vote. In 2003, Gilleland was appointed to the Maryland House of Delegates by Republican governor Robert Ehrlich in May 2003, taking the place of Republican James E. Rzepkowski, who accepted a position within Ehrlich's cabinet as Associate Deputy Secretary for the Department of Business and Economic Development.

Gilleland was defeated in his first election as the incumbent in the 2006 general election by Pamela Beidle. The other two delegates for District 32, Democrats Mary Ann Love and Theodore Sophocleus, both won reelection.

Currently Gilleland is an Account Manager with an educational assessment firm. He is also a former chairman of the Anne Arundel County Republican Central Committee and a former student member of the Anne Arundel County Board of Education.

=== Legislative notes ===
- voted for the Healthy Air Act in 2006 (SB154)
- voted for slots in 2005 (HB1361)
