= Mary Roe Walkup =

American politician (born 1924)

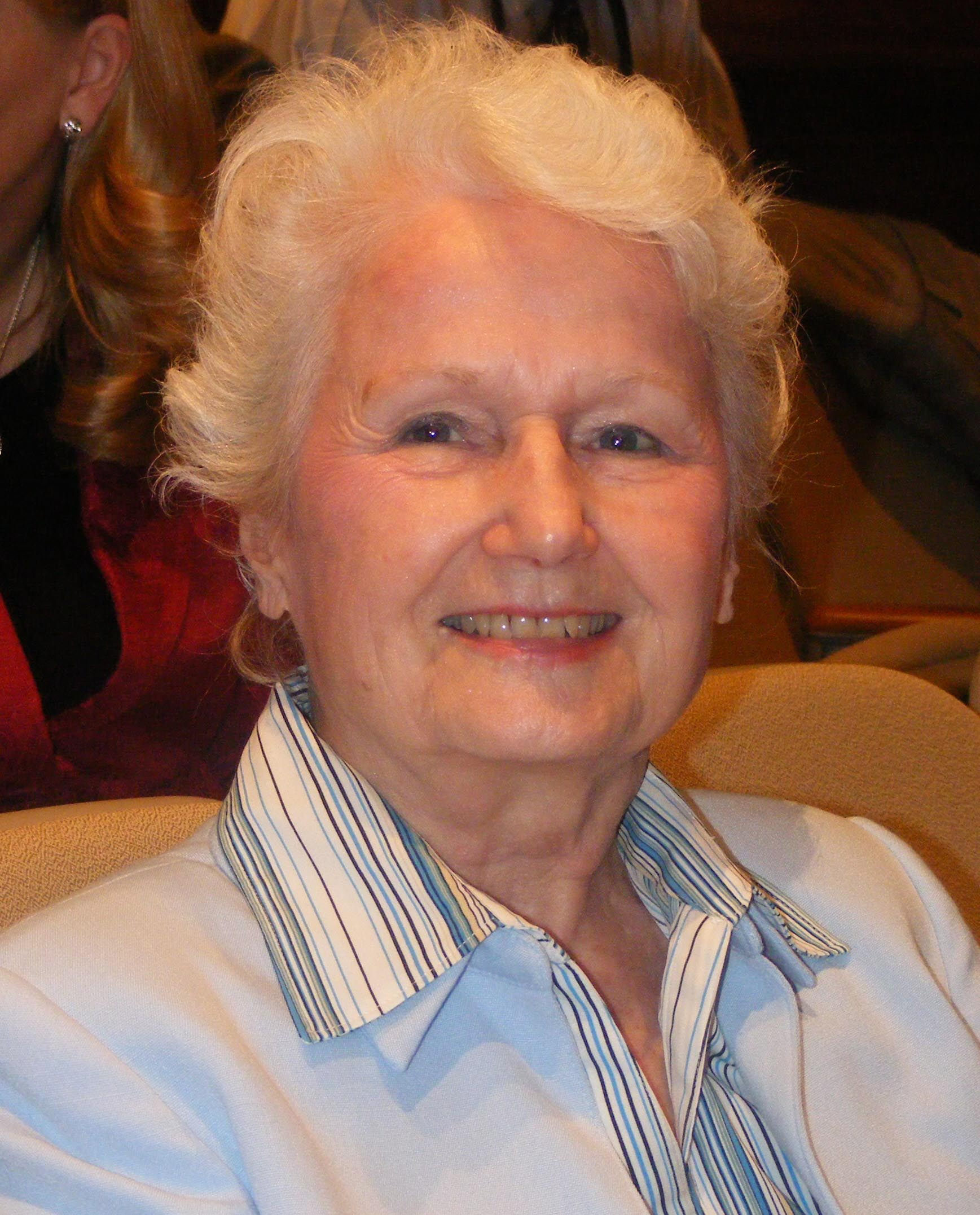

Delegate Maryland District 36
- In office January 11, 1995 – January 12, 2011
- Preceded by: C. Ronald Franks

Personal details
- Born: May 4, 1924 (age 102) Kent County, Maryland, U.S.
- Party: Republican
- Spouse: Harry
- Profession: nurse

Mary Roe Walkup (born May 4, 1924) is an American former politician who was a delegate in the Maryland House of Delegates. She represented District 36, which covers Caroline, Cecil, Kent and Queen Anne's Counties.

== Background ==
First elected in 1994, she won one of two seats left open by R. Clayton Mitchell and C. Ronald Franks, serving alongside Wheeler R. Baker and Ronald A. Guns. In 1998, delegates were elected by county, in which case Walkup defeated Democratic challenger Clarence Hawkins for the seat in Kent County. In 2002, the election returned to the District selecting three delegates from the list. She was one of three Republicans, the others being Richard Sossi and Michael D. Smigiel, Sr., that helped unseat incumbent Wheeler R. Baker. Finally, in 2006, the election returned to voting for one candidate per county, and she won reelection by defeating Joan O. Horsey.

== Education ==
Walkup attended Kent County public schools. She graduated from the University of Maryland School of Nursing with her R.N. in 1945.

== Career ==
After college, Walkup was a nurse at the University of Maryland Hospital. In 1978, she was elected to the Board of County Commissioners for Kent County, serving two terms, the second term as President.

Walkup has also been a lifelong advocate of environmental matters. She served for four years starting in 1982 as a delegate for the Legislative Committee on the Maryland Association of Counties. She is a charter member of Kent Conservation, Inc., as citizens' watchdog group founded in 1969 that focuses on environmental issues in Kent County.

Walkup is also a member of the Kent Chapter of the American Red Cross, Kent County Farm Bureau, the Chester River Association, the Eastern Shore Land Conservancy, and the Maryland Conservation Council. In 1977, she received the Conservationist of the Year from the Maryland Wildlife Federation.

== In the legislature ==
As a member of the Maryland House of Delegates, Walkup served on the Economic Matters Committee beginning in 1995, and several other subcommittees.

=== Legislative notes ===
- voted for the Clean Indoor Air Act of 2007 (HB359)
- voted for the Healthy Air Act in 2006 (SB154)
- voted for slots in 2005 (HB1361)
- voted for electric deregulation in 1999 (HB703)
- voted for income tax reduction in 1998 (SB750)
- voted against in-state tuition for illegal immigrants in 2007 (HB6)

== Election results ==
- 2006 Race for Maryland House of Delegates – District 36 - Kent County

Voters to choose three:

Name	Votes	Percent	Outcome
Mary Roe Walkup, Rep.	19,430	59.0%	Won
Joan O. Horsey, Dem.	13,498	41.0%	Won

- 2002 Race for Maryland House of Delegates – District 36

Voters to choose three:

Name	Votes	Percent	Outcome
Richard Sossi, Rep.	19,098	19.0%	Won
Michael D. Smigiel, Sr., Rep.	19,216	19.1%	Won
Mary Roe Walkup, Rep.	28,230	28.0%	Won
Wheeler R. Baker, Dem.	17,575	17.5%	Lost
James G. Crouse, Dem.	16,329	16.2%	Lost
Other Write-Ins	277	0.3%	

- 1998 Race for Maryland House of Delegates – District 36 - Kent County

Voters to choose one for each county:

Name	Votes	Percent	Outcome
Mary Roe Walkup, Rep.	17,720	58%	Won
Clarence A. Hawkins, Dem.	12,655	42%	Lost

- 1994 Race for Maryland House of Delegates – District 36

Voters to choose three:

Name	Votes	Percent	Outcome
Mary Roe Walkup, Rep.	13,589	18%	Won
Wheeler R. Baker, Dem.	13,911	18%	Won
Ronald A. Guns, Dem.	14,915	20%	Won
W. Michael Newnam, Rep.	11,874	16%	Lost
Sharon Maenner Carrick, Rep.	11,350	15%	Lost
Allaire D. Williams, Rep.	10,796	14%	Lost
