= Michael D. Smigiel Sr. =

American politician (1958–2022)

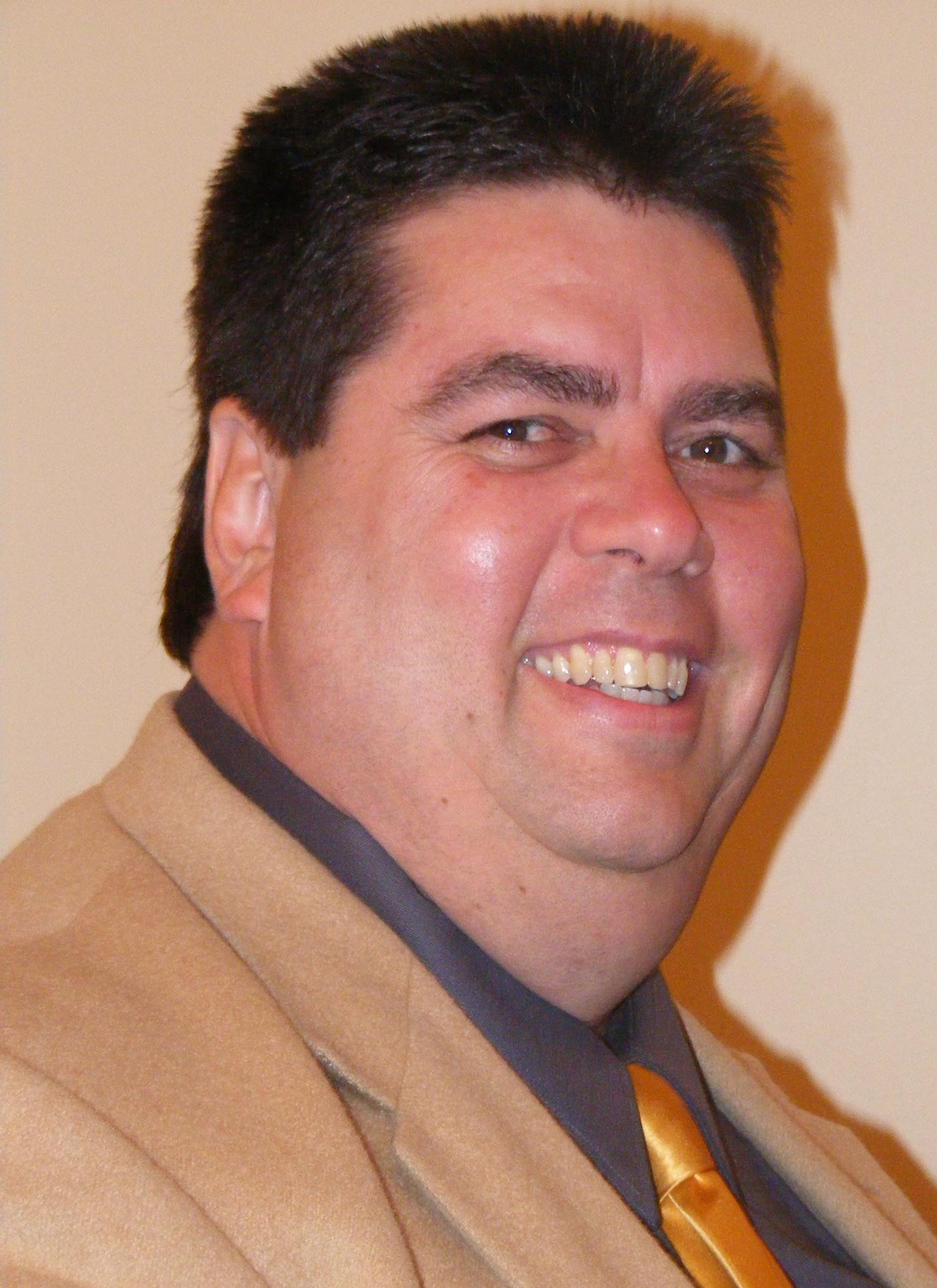

Member of the Maryland House of Delegates from the 36th district
- In office January 8, 2003 – January 14, 2015
- Preceded by: James G. Crouse
- Succeeded by: Jefferson L. Ghrist
- Constituency: Upper Eastern Shore of Maryland

Personal details
- Born: June 18, 1958 Baltimore, Maryland, U.S.
- Died: August 28, 2022 (aged 64)
- Party: Republican
- Profession: Attorney

Michael D. Smigiel Sr. (June 18, 1958 – August 28, 2022) was an American politician who was a member of the Maryland House of Delegates, where he represented District 36, which covers Caroline, Cecil, Kent, and Queen Anne's Counties. He was first elected in 2002 along with fellow Republicans Richard Sossi and Mary Roe Walkup after the legislative boundaries were redrawn. Prior to 2002, District 36 had a separate representative for Cecil, Kent, and Queen Anne's Counties. After combining the districts, Smigiel won the seat previously occupied by former Elkton Mayor, James Crouse. Crouse was appointed to the seat in July 2001 following Governor Parris Glendenning's appointment of longtime Elkton Delegate Ronald A. Guns to the Public Service Commission. In 2006, he defeated Democratic challenger Mark Guns for reelection. In the 2006 election, the voting method returned to voting for a representative for each county.

== Education ==
Smigiel attended Elgin Community College in Elgin, Illinois. There he received his A.A. degree in psychology and history in 1982. After community college, he went to undergraduate school at Northern Illinois University, where he got his B.A. in political science in 1985. In 1989, he received his J.D. from Northern Illinois University College of Law. Michael served as president of his law school class.

== Career ==
After high school, Smigiel served in the United States Marine Corps from 1975 until 1979. After college, Smigiel was admitted to Maryland Bar in 1989 and worked thereafter as an attorney. He was also a member of the Cecil County Bar Association, where he served as chair of the ethics committee and as a member of the board of directors. He also belonged to the Maryland Association of Justice.

Smigiel was also the founder of Mediation, Inc., and alternative dispute resolution center. He served as a member of the Board of Directors for the Bainbridge Naval Training Center Historical Association, Inc.

=== In the legislature ===
In the Maryland General Assembly, Smigiel held the position of Minority Parliamentarian and was on the Judiciary Committee where he was a member of the criminal justice subcommittee and was active on several work-groups. He was previously a Deputy Minority Whip from 2003 to 2006 and a member of the Health and Government Operations Committee. Smigiel served as Vice Chair of the Juvenile subcommittee, and was the Vice Chair of the Eastern Shore Delegation representing the nine counties of the Eastern Shore of Maryland. In addition, Smigiel was the founder and chairperson of the Maryland House of Delegates Tea Party Caucus.

==== Legislative notes ====
- in 2014 Co-Sponsored legislation to cut off the National Security Agency's water and electricity if the agency continued to collect electronic data without specific warrants.
- in 2013 Co-Sponsored legislation to require a 2/3rds vote in the General Assembly to raise taxes
- in 2013 Sponsored a bill to repeal the use of speed cameras
- in 2013 Co-Sponsored legislation to impose larger penalties on local governments found to have violated Maryland's open meeting law
- in 2012 Co-sponsored bill to require health insurance carriers to provide coverage of Telemedicine services
- in 2011 Proposed an amendment to the state constitution to make appropriations subject to petition for a referendum, which are currently exempt under Maryland law
- in 2010 Co Sponsored a 'Taxpayers Bill of Rights' constitutional amendment which would have required certain new taxes be placed to a popular vote, limited increases in the state budget to the amount of inflation plus annual population increase
- voted against in-state tuition for illegal immigrants in 2007 (HB6)
- voted against the Clean Indoor Air Act of 2007 (HB359)
- voted for slots in 2005 (HB1361)

== Task Force, Boards and Commissions ==
In 2012, Smigiel was appointed by Maryland legislative leaders to a task force to study the impact of a Maryland Court of Appeals ruling regarding the liability of owners of pit bulls and landlords that rent to them.

== Congressional Run ==
In 2016, Smigiel sought the Republican nomination for Maryland's 1st congressional district, challenging incumbent Andy Harris in the party primary. Smiegel claimed that he felt "betrayed" by Harris and other Republicans, and attacked the incumbent from a conservative position on education, state powers, free markets, and taxation. He was overwhelmingly defeated by Harris.

== Death ==
Smigiel died at the age of 64 from a heart disease on August 28, 2022.

== Election results ==
- 2006 Race for Maryland House of Delegates – District 36 Cecil County

Voters to choose one per county:

Name	Votes	Percent	Outcome
Michael D. Smigiel Sr., Rep.	17,764	53.4%	Won
Mark Guns, Dem.	15,475	46.6%	Lost

- 2002 Race for Maryland House of Delegates – District 36

Voters to choose three:

Name	Votes	Percent	Outcome
Richard Sossi, Rep.	19,098	19.0%	Won
Michael D. Smigiel Sr., Rep.	19,216	19.1%	Won
Mary Roe Walkup, Rep.	28,230	28.0%	Won
Wheeler R. Baker, Dem.	17,575	17.5%	Lost
James G. Crouse, Dem.	16,329	16.2%	Lost
Other Write-Ins	277	0.3%	
