= Richard A. Sossi =

American politician

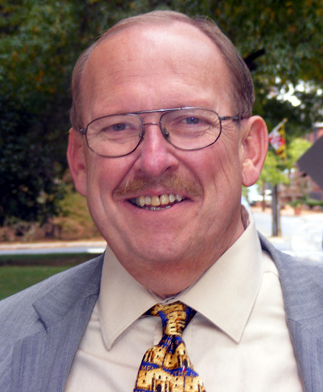

Delegate Maryland District 36
- In office January 8, 2003 – January 2011
- Preceded by: Wheeler R. Baker
- Succeeded by: Steve Hershey

Personal details
- Born: July 23, 1943 (age 83) New York, NY
- Party: Republican

Richard Sossi is a former member of the Maryland House of Delegates. He represented District 36, which covers Caroline, Cecil, Kent, and Queen Anne's Counties.

== Education ==
Sossi graduated from the University of Colorado at Boulder in 1965 with a B.A. in Asian Studies.

== Career ==
After college, Sossi joined the United States Navy, where he served from 1965 until 1970. He did a tour in Vietnam, from 1966 until 1967, and served as Deputy Branch Chief for the National Security Agency from 1968 to 1970. While in the military, he graduated from the Defense Language Institute studying Chinese. He also completed Officers' Cryptologic Course for the National Security Agency in 1969.

After the military, Sossi was a self-employed businessman, owning The Ship and Soldier Shop since 1977. He was a member of the Queen Anne's County Republican Central Committee from 1990 until 1998. He has had the honor of serving as an alternate delegate to the Republican Party National Convention several times (1992, 1996, 2000).

In his community, Sossi is a member of the American Legion Post 278, the Elks Lodge, the Moose Lodge, the Vietnam Veterans of America, and the Coastal Conservation of America. He also serves on the Cecil County Chamber of Commerce, the Queen Anne's County Chamber of Commerce, and Rotary International.

== Family ==
Richard Sossi married Flora Schoolfield (Sossi) in 1970 and has one daughter, Yvette Sossi Kalkay, and two grandson, Armando Kalkay, James Sossi

== The Maryland General Assembly ==
He was first elected in 2003 and served along with fellow Republicans Michael D. Smigiel Sr. and Mary Roe Walkup. In 2002, he defeated Democratic incumbent Wheeler R. Baker for the seat in Queen Anne's County. In 2002, the election for that district called for the voters to choose 3 from the slate, whereas in the 1998 election, the voters chose one delegate from each county.

In 2006, Sossi defeated Wheeler R. Baker again, this time with 53% of the vote.

As a member in the Maryland House of Delegates, Sossi was appointed to be the Deputy Minority Whip in 2007. He serves on the Environmental Matters Committee (2003–2011) and numerous subcommittees including local government & bi-county agencies subcommittee, 2003–05; housing & real property subcommittee, 2003–05, 2007-; natural resources subcommittee, 2003-; affordable housing work group, 2004; housing for individuals with disabilities work group, 2004; natural resources & ethics subcommittee, 2005; land use & ethics subcommittee, 2006; agriculture, agriculture preservation & open space subcommittee, (2006–2011); ground rent work group, (2006–2011); co-chair, abatement of drug-related nuisances work group, 2004); Chair, Queen Anne's County Delegation, (2003–2011). Member, Maryland Rural Caucus, (2003–2011); Maryland Legislative Sportsmen's Caucus, (2003–2011); Maryland Veterans Caucus, (2005–2011); Member, Bainbridge Development Advisory Board, (2003–2011); Task Force on Traffic Capacity Across the Chesapeake Bay, 2005–06; Task Force to Study Visual Smoke and Evacuation Alarms for the Deaf and Hard of Hearing, 2005–06; J. DeWeese Carter Center Advisory Board, (2005–2011); Task Force to Study the Boating Industry in Maryland, (2007–2011).

=== Legislative notes ===
- voted against the Clean Indoor Air Act of 2007 (HB359)
- voted against in-state tuition for illegal immigrants in 2007 (HB6)
- sponsored and voted for Veterans Advocacy and Education Act of 2006 (law)(HB3) (SB305)
- sponsored and voted for Prohibition against Inflicting Unnecessary Suffering or Pain on Animals (regardless of ownership) 2006 (law)
- voted against the Healthy Air Act in 2006 (SB154)
- voted for slots in 2005 (HB1361)

== Election results ==
- 2006 Race for Maryland House of Delegates – District 36 Queen Anne's County

Voters to choose one per county:

Name	Votes	Percent	Outcome
Richard Sossi, Rep.	19,450	53.4%	Won
Wheeler R. Baker, Dem.	16,950	46.6%	Lost

- 2002 Race for Maryland House of Delegates – District 36

Voters to choose three:

Name	Votes	Percent	Outcome
Richard Sossi, Rep.	19,098	19.0%	Won
Michael D. Smigiel, Sr., Rep.	19,216	19.1%	Won
Mary Roe Walkup, Rep.	28,230	28.0%	Won
Wheeler R. Baker, Dem.	17,575	17.5%	Lost
James G. Crouse, Dem.	16,329	16.2%	Lost
Other Write-Ins	277	0.3%	

- 1998 Race for Maryland House of Delegates – District 36 Queen Anne's County

Voters to choose one per county:

Name	Votes	Percent	Outcome
Wheeler R. Baker, Dem.	17,109	55%	Won
Richard Sossi, Rep.	13,807	45%	Lost
