= Wheeler R. Baker =

American politician (born 1946)

Member of the Maryland House of Delegates from the 36th district
- In office January 11, 1995 – January 8, 2003
- Preceded by: R. Clayton Mitchell Jr.
- Succeeded by: Richard Sossi

Personal details
- Born: November 26, 1946 (age 79) Easton, MD
- Party: Republican Party, Formerly Democratic

Wheeler R. Baker is a former member of the Maryland House of Delegates, serving District 36, which covers Caroline, Cecil, Kent, and Queen Anne's Counties. Mr. Baker is known for his colorful home-spun language. He is quoted as saying such things as "I just feel like I can carry the water pail better than he can." and "I tell people we need to knock the dents out from the inside."

== Education ==
Delegate Baker graduated from Centreville High School in Queen Anne's County, MD on the Eastern Shore of Maryland. Later he attended Chesapeake College.

== Career ==
After high school, Delegate Baker joined the United States Air Force and served from 1964 until 1968. After his stint in the military, Baker ran his own business.

Delegate Baker has long been involved with Eastern Shore organizations. Prior to being elected to the House of Delegates, Baker was elected to the board of County Commissioners for Queen Anne's County, a position he held from 1986 until 1990. Before that he was a member of the Queen Anne's County Democratic Central Committee from 1974 until 1978. He was a member of the Chesapeake Bay Trust from 1995 until 2001. Additionally, he served on the Governor's Task Force on Eastern Shore Economic Development from 1999 until 2001, the Task Force to Study the Maryland Agricultural Land Preservation Foundation from 2000 until 2001, the Mid-Shore Regional Council from 2001 until 2003, and finally the Tri-County Council for the Lower Eastern Shore of Maryland .

While a member of the Maryland House of Delegates, Wheeler Baker served on several committees including: the Appropriations Committee from 1995 until 2003, and several subcommittees. He was the chair of the Queen Anne's County Delegation from 1995 until 2003.

Since being defeated for reelection in 2002, Baker has run for reelection (in 2006), but has stayed involved in Eastern Shore politics. He is a current member of the Kent Narrows Development Foundation, an organization sponsors community activities on Kent Island in Queen Anne's County. He currently owns Baker Liquor Store and Deli in Chester, Maryland.

== Election results ==
- 2006 Race for Maryland House of Delegates – District 36 Queen Anne's County

Voters to choose one per county:

Name	Votes	Percent	Outcome
Richard Sossi, Rep.	19,450	53.4%	Won
Wheeler R. Baker, Dem.	16,950	46.6%	Lost

- 2002 Race for Maryland House of Delegates – District 36

Voters to choose three:

Name	Votes	Percent	Outcome
Richard Sossi, Rep.	19,098	19.0%	Won
Michael D. Smigiel, Sr., Rep.	19,216	19.1%	Won
Mary Roe Walkup, Rep.	28,230	28.0%	Won
Wheeler R. Baker, Dem.	17,575	17.5%	Lost
James G. Crouse, Dem.	16,329	16.2%	Lost
Other Write-Ins	277	0.3%	

- 1998 Race for Maryland House of Delegates – District 36 Queen Anne's County

Voters to choose one per county:

Name	Votes	Percent	Outcome
Wheeler R. Baker, Dem.	17,109	55%	Won
Richard Sossi, Rep.	13,807	45%	Lost

- 1994 Race for Maryland House of Delegates – District 36

Voters to choose three:

Name	Votes	Percent	Outcome
Ronald A. Guns, Dem.	14,915	20%	Won
Wheeler R. Baker, Dem.	13,911	18%	Won
Mary Roe Walkup, Rep.	13,589	18%	Won
W. Michael Newnam, Rep.	11,874	16%	Lost
Sharon Maenner Carrick, Rep.	11,350	15%	Lost
Allaire D. Williams, Rep.	10,796	14%	Lost
