= Theodore J. Sophocleus =

American politician

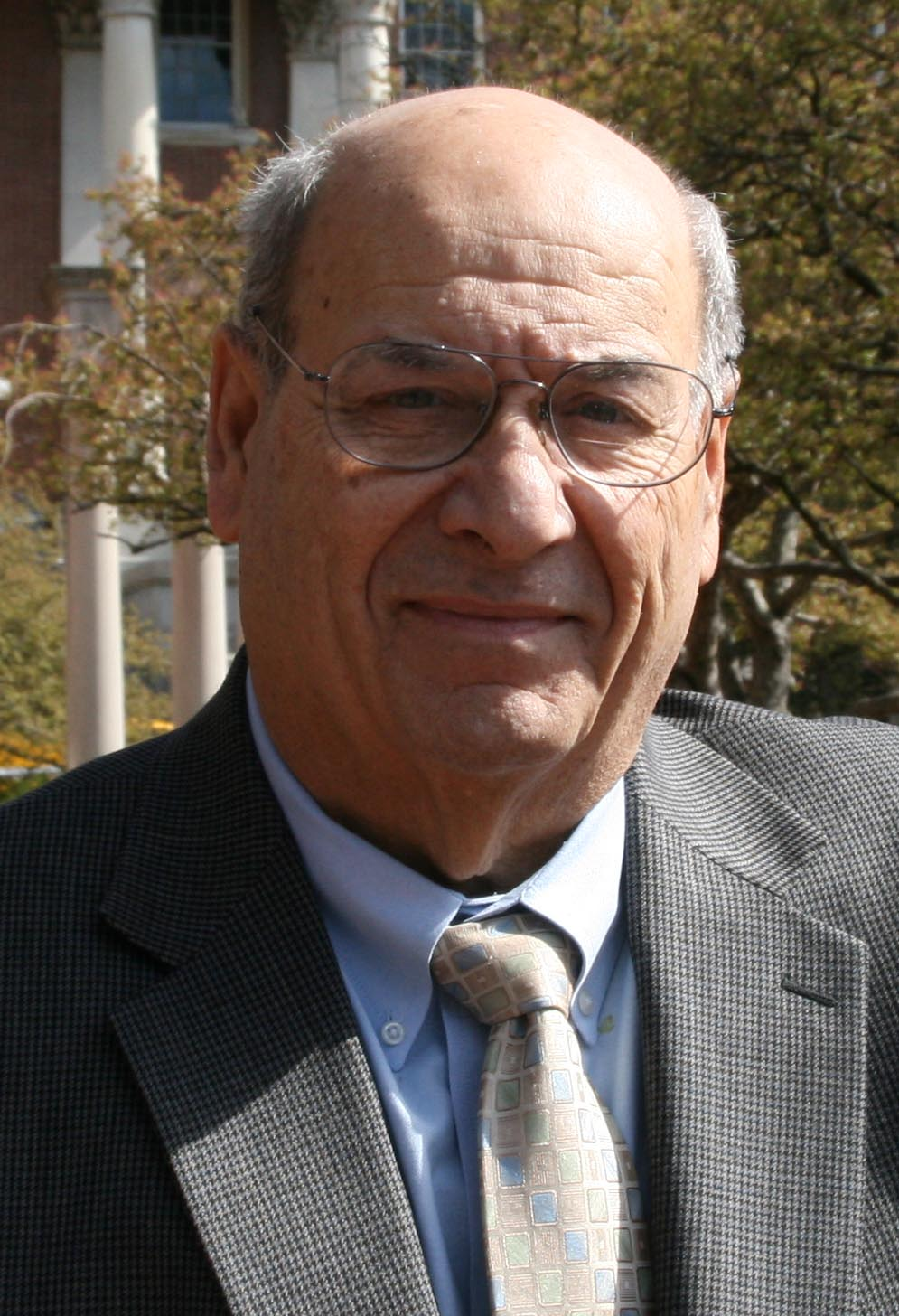

Member of the Maryland House of Delegates from District 32
- In office January 9, 1999 – June 8, 2018
- Preceded by: Michael W. Burns
- Constituency: Anne Arundel County, Maryland, U.S.

Member of the Maryland House of Delegates from District 30
- In office June 25, 1993 – 1995
- Preceded by: Tyras S. Athey
- Succeeded by: Mary Ann Love, Michael W. Burns, and James E. Rzepkowski
- Constituency: District 30, Anne Arundel County

Personal details
- Born: May 28, 1939 Baltimore, Maryland, U.S.
- Died: June 8, 2018 (aged 79) Baltimore, Maryland, U.S.
- Party: Democratic

Theodore J. Sophocleus (May 28, 1939 – June 8, 2018) was an American politician from Maryland and a member of the Democratic Party. Before seeking political office, he was a pharmacist and a drug store chain executive.

== Early life and education ==
Sophocleus was born in Baltimore, on May 29, 1939, the son of Greek-American immigrants John and Despina Sophocleus. As a youth, he lived in the city's Highlandtown neighborhood and attended Patterson Park High School in Baltimore. After high school, he graduated from the University of Maryland School of Pharmacy, where he earned his Bachelor of Science degree in Pharmacy in 1962.

== Career ==
After graduation, Sophocleus worked for the Read's Drug Store chain from 1960 to 1977, rising to an executive position. He subsequently was an executive with a Texas drug store chain before moving to Linthicum, Maryland, where he opened his own pharmacy.

=== Political career ===
Sophocleus first served two terms on the elected County Council of Anne Arundel County, Maryland, beginning in 1982. He took an active role on his constituents' behalf regarding noise abatement issues at Baltimore–Washington International Airport in Linthicum. He ran unsuccessfully for Anne Arundel County Executive in 1990 and 1994.

=== As a state legislator ===
Sophocleus began serving in the Maryland House of Delegates in 1993, when he was appointed by Governor William Donald Schaefer to replace Tyras S. Athey (who had resigned). Sophocleus was elected in his own right in 1998 and was serving in his fourth full term in the House of Delegates at the time of his death, representing Maryland's District 32 in Anne Arundel County.

He served on many committees, including the Appropriations Committee, and was also Deputy Majority Whip.

==== Legislative votes ====
While in the House, Delegate Sophocleus:

- voted against the Clean Indoor Air Act of 2007 (HB359)
- voted against Tax Reform Act of 2007 to increase sales tax by 20% (HB2)
- opposed medical marijuana
- voted for the Maryland Gang Prosecution Act of 2007 (HB713), subjecting gang members to up to 20 years in prison and/or a fine of up to $100,000
- voted in 2007 for a Maryland version of "Jessica's Law" (HB 930), eliminating parole for the most violent child sexual predators and creating a mandatory minimum sentence of 25 years in state prison
- voted in 2008 for Public Safety – Statewide DNA Database System – Crimes of Violence and Burglary – Post conviction (HB 370), helping to give police officers and prosecutors greater resources to solve crimes and eliminating a backlog of 24,000 unanalyzed DNA samples, leading to 192 arrests
- voted in 2009 for Vehicle Laws – Repeated Drunk and Drugged Driving Offenses – Suspension of License (HB 293), strengthening Maryland's drunk driving laws by imposing a mandatory one year license suspension for a person convicted of drunk driving more than once in five years
- also voted in 2009 for HB 102, creating the House Emergency Medical Services System Workgroup, leading to Maryland's budgeting of $52 million to fund three new Medevac helicopters to replace the State's aging fleet
- between 2015-2018, he annually voted to support classroom teachers, public schools, police and hospitals in Anne Arundel County. Since 2002, funding to schools across the State has increased 82%, resulting in Maryland being ranked top in the nation for K-12 education.

==== Election results ====
- 2006 Race for Maryland House of Delegates – District 32

Voters to choose three:

Name	Votes	Percent	Outcome
Pamela Beidle, Dem.	17,964	18.6%	Won
Mary Ann Love, Dem.	17,697	18.3%	Won
Theodore Sophocleus, Dem.	17,661	18.3%	Won
Mark S. Chang, Sr, Rep.	16,569	17.1%	Lost
Terry R. Gilleland, Jr., Rep.	13,632	14.1%	Lost
Wayne Charles Smith, Rep.	13,153	13.6%	Lost
Other Write-Ins	75	0.1%	Lost

- 2002 Race for Maryland House of Delegates – District 32

Voters to choose three:

Name	Votes	Percent	Outcome
James E. Rzepkowski, Rep.	18,299	19.84%	Won
Theodore Sophocleus, Dem.	16,842	18.26%	Won
Mary Ann Love, Dem.	16,646	18.05%	Won
Robert G. Pepersack, Sr, Rep.	14,628	15.86%	Lost
Victor A. Sulin, Dem.	13,694	14.85%	Lost
David P. Starr, Rep.	12,020	13.04%	Lost
Other Write-Ins	82	0.09%	Lost

- 1998 Race for Maryland House of Delegates – District 32

Voters to choose three:

Name	Votes	Percent	Outcome
Mary Ann Love, Dem.	15,823	19%	Won
Theodore Sophocleus, Dem.	15,382	18%	Won
James E. Rzepkowski, Rep.	14,959	18%	Won
Michael W. Burns, Rep.	13,247	16%	Lost
Victor Sulin, Dem.	12,658	15%	Lost
Betty Ann O'Neill, Dem.	11,752	14%	Lost

== Death ==
Sophocleus died on June 8, 2018, while hospitalized in Baltimore. He was survived by his wife, Alice. Upon his death, both fellow Democrats and Republicans in the House of Delegates lauded his bipartisan helpfulness. Said one Republican Delegate: "Ted Sophocleus was one of the finest people I've met in public office. He was honest, true to himself and his constituents, and loved his family dearly."

== Honors and awards ==
Sophocleus was inducted by his alma mater into the Patterson Park High School "Alumni Hall of Fame". He was honored by the Maryland State's Attorneys' Association as "Legislator of the Year" in 2004. The Maryland Network Against Domestic Violence also named him "Legislator of the Year", in 2005.
