= Mary Ann Love =

American politician (1940–2022)

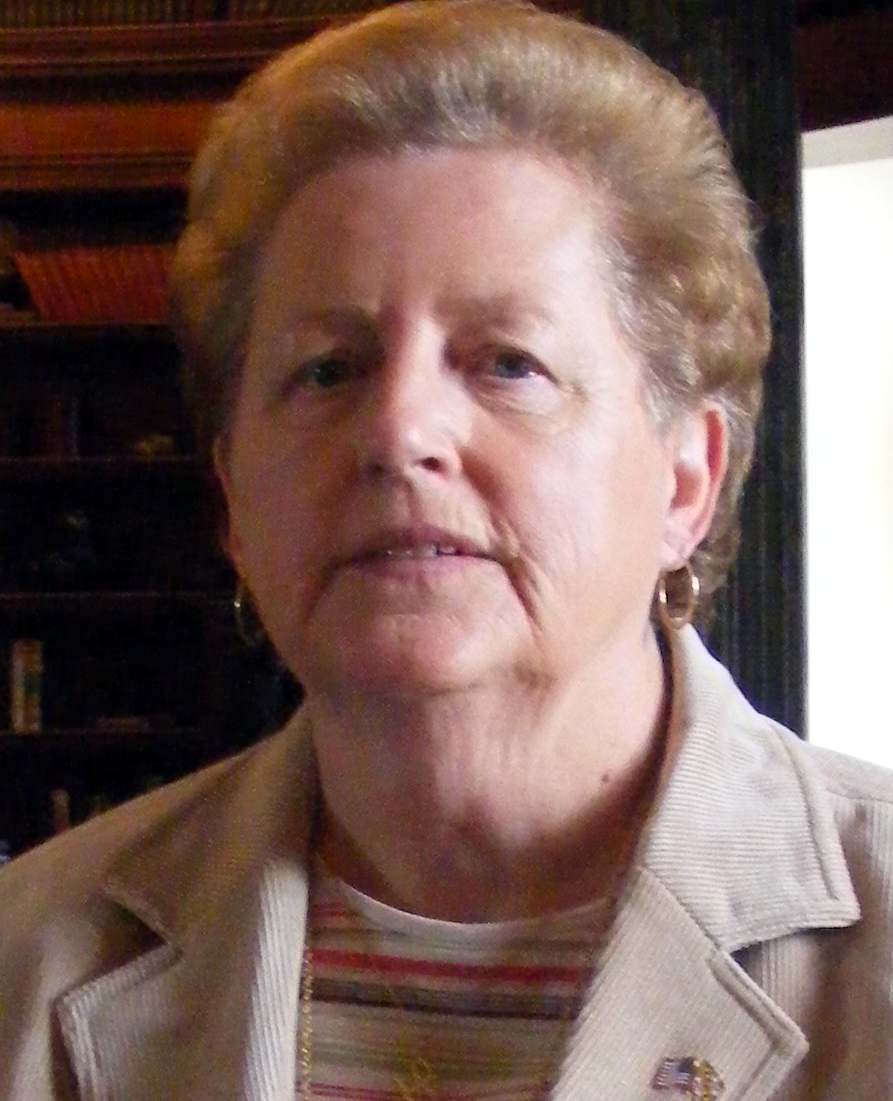

Member of the Maryland House of Delegates from District 32
- In office June 25, 1993 – January 13, 2015
- Succeeded by: Mark S. Chang
- Constituency: District 32, Anne Arundel County

Personal details
- Born: February 21, 1940 West Pittston, Pennsylvania
- Died: January 27, 2022 (aged 81) Glen Burnie, Maryland
- Party: Democratic

Mary Ann Love (February 21, 1940 – January 27, 2022) was an American politician from Maryland and a member of the Democratic Party. She served 4 full terms in the Maryland House of Delegates, representing Maryland's District 32. Love was originally appointed to the seat in 1993, but was later elected in her own right. She most recently served on the Economic Matters Committee. Love declined to run for reelection in 2014.

== Early life ==
Mary Ann was born in West Pittston, Pennsylvania on February 21, 1940. She graduated from St. John's High School in 1958. She attended the Wilkes-Barre Business School.

== Career ==
=== Legislative Notes ===
- voted in favor of increasing the sales tax by from 5% to 6% - Tax Reform Act of 2007(HB2)
- voted to support in-state tuition for all graduates of a Maryland public high school, 2007(HB6)
- voted for the Maryland Gang Prosecution Act of 2007 (HB713), subjecting gang members to up to 20 years in prison and/or a fine of up to $100,000
- voted for Jessica's Law (HB 930), eliminating parole for the most violent child sexual predators and creating a mandatory minimum sentence of 25 years in state prison, 2007
- voted for Public Safety – Statewide DNA Database System – Crimes of Violence and Burglary – Post conviction (HB 370), helping to give police officers and prosecutors greater resources to solve crimes and eliminating a backlog of 24,000 unanalyzed DNA samples, leading to 192 arrests, 2008
- voted for Vehicle Laws – Repeated Drunk and Drugged Driving Offenses – Suspension of License (HB 293), strengthening Maryland's drunk driving laws by imposing a mandatory one year license suspension for a person convicted of drunk driving more than once in five years, 2009
- voted for HB 102, creating the House Emergency Medical Services System Workgroup, leading to Maryland's budgeting of $52 million to fund three new Medevac helicopters to replace the State's aging fleet, 2009
- voted in 2013 in favor of gun control legislation (SB 281) banning certain firearms and placing significant new restrictions on the ability of law-abiding citizens to own firearms

=== Election results ===
- 2002 Race for Maryland House of Delegates – District 32

Voters to choose three:

Name	Votes	Percent	Outcome
James E. Rzepkowski, Rep.	18,299	19.84%	Won
Theodore Sophocleus, Dem.	16,842	18.26%	Won
Mary Ann Love, Dem.	16,646	18.05%	Won
Robert G. Pepersack, Sr, Rep.	14,628	15.86%	Lost
Victor A. Sulin, Dem.	13,694	14.85%	Lost
David P. Starr, Rep.	12,020	13.04%	Lost
Other Write-Ins	82	0.09%	Lost

- 1998 Race for Maryland House of Delegates – District 32

Voters to choose three:

Name	Votes	Percent	Outcome
Mary Ann Love, Dem.	15,823	19%	Won
Theodore Sophocleus, Dem.	15,382	18%	Won
James E. Rzepkowski, Rep.	14,959	18%	Won
Michael W. Burns, Rep.	13,247	16%	Lost
Victor Sulin, Dem.	12,658	15%	Lost
Betty Ann O'Neill, Dem.	11,752	14%	Lost

- 1994 Race for Maryland House of Delegates – District 32

Voters to choose three:

Name	Votes	Percent	Outcome
James E. Rzepkowski, Rep.	15,147	20%	Won
Michael W. Burns, Rep.	12,883	17%	Won
Mary Ann Love, Dem.	12,414	16%	Won
Gerald P. Starr, Rep.	12,166	16%	Lost
Victor A. Sulin, Dem.	11,872	16%	Lost
Thomas H. Dixon III, Dem.	11,002	15%	Lost

== Death ==
Love died on January 27, 2022, aged 81.
