= 2002 Maryland House of Delegates election =

- November 5, 2002

All 141 seats in the Maryland House of Delegates 71 seats needed for a majority
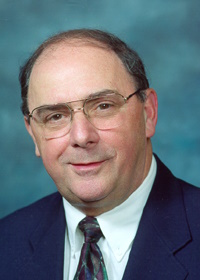

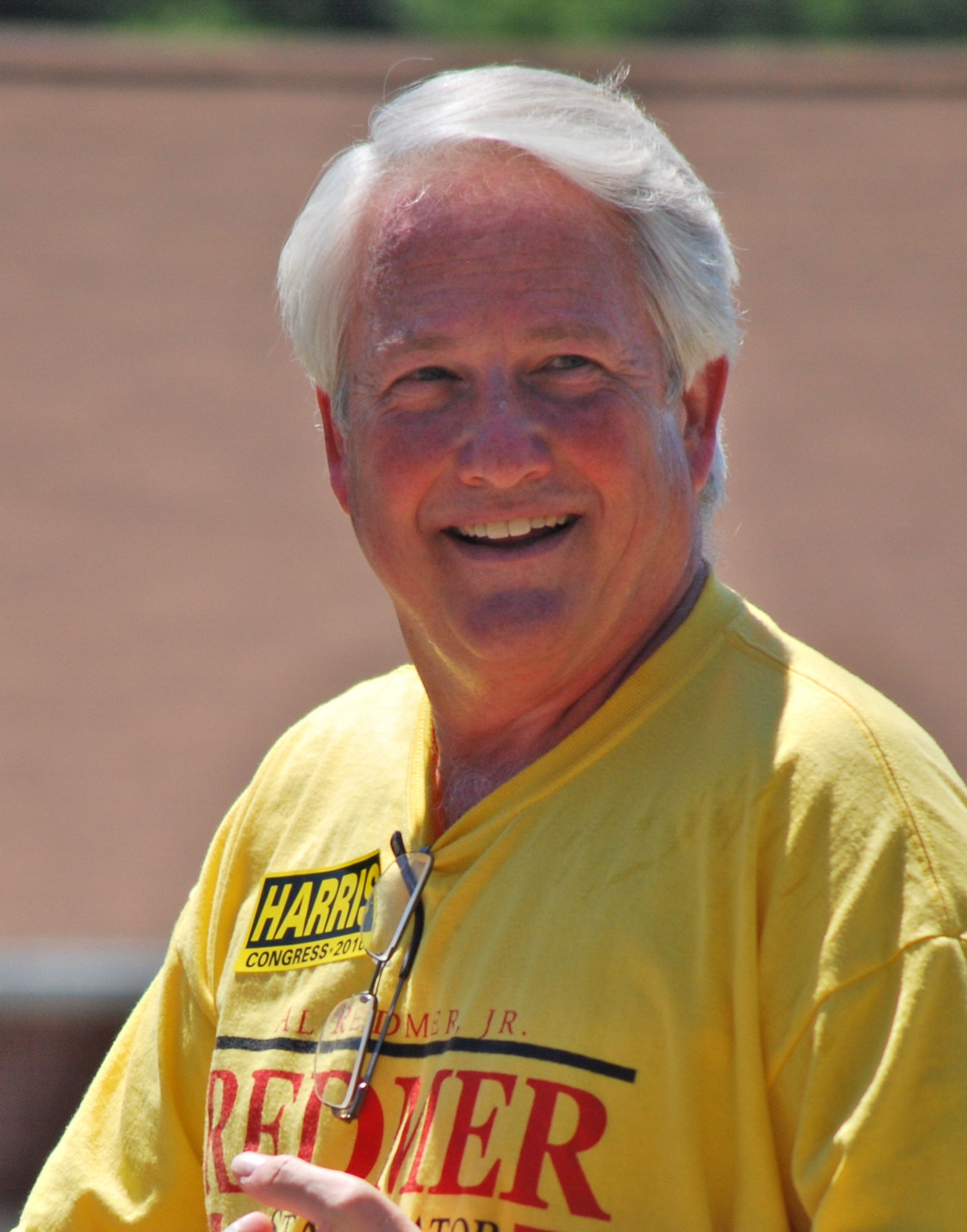
	Majority party	Minority party
Leader	Casper R. Taylor Jr. (lost re-election)	Al Redmer
Party	Democratic	Republican
Last election	106	35
Seats won	98	43
Seat change	▼8	▲8
- Results: Democratic gain Republican gain Democratic hold Republican hold
Speaker before election
Casper R. Taylor Jr.
Democratic
Elected Speaker
Michael E. Busch
Democratic

The 2002 Maryland House of Delegates elections were held on November 5, 2002, as part of the 2002 United States elections, including the 2002 Maryland gubernatorial election . All 141 of Maryland's state delegates were up for reelection.

== Retiring incumbents ==
=== Democrats ===
1. District 3: Sue Hecht retired to run for Maryland state senator in District 3.
2. District 6: Edmund C. Dotterwiech Jr. retired.
3. District 8: Kathy Klausmeier retired to run for Maryland state senator in District 8.
4. District 13B: John A. Giannetti Jr. retired to run for Maryland state senator in District 13.
5. District 14: Tod David Sher retired to run for Maryland state senator in District 14.
6. District 15: Mark Kennedy Shriver retired to run for Congress in Maryland's 8th congressional district.
7. District 17: Cheryl Kagan retired.
8. District 18: Sharon M. Grosfeld retired to run for Maryland state senator in District 18.
9. District 22B: Rushern Baker retired to run for Prince George's County Executive.
10. District 24: Darren Swain retired to run for Maryland state senator in District 47.
11. District 26: Kerry A. Hill retired.
12. District 26: David Mercado Valderrama retired to run for Maryland state senator in District 44.
13. District 33: Robert C. Baldwin retired.
14. District 39: Paul H. Carlson retired.
15. District 41: Lisa Gladden retired to run for Maryland state senator in District 41.
16. District 44: Verna L. Jones retired to run for Maryland state senator in District 44.
17. District 46: Cornell N. Dypski retired.
18. District 47: John F. Quirk retired.

=== Republicans ===
1. District 4: David R. Brinkley retired to run for Maryland state senator in District 4.
2. District 5B: Joseph M. Getty retired.
3. District 8: James F. Ports Jr. retired to run for the Baltimore County Council.
4. District 9A: Martha Scanlan Klima retired to run for Maryland state senator in District 42.
5. District 12A: Donald E. Murphy retired.
6. District 15: Richard A. La Vay retired.
7. District 33: Janet Greenip retired to run for Maryland state senator in District 33.

== Incumbents defeated ==
=== In primary elections ===
==== Democrats ====
1. District 6: Jacob Mohorovic Jr. lost a redistricting race to Michael H. Weir Jr., John S. Arnick, and Joseph J. Minnick.
2. District 11: Dana Stein lost to Robert Zirkin, Dan K. Morhaim, and Jon S. Cardin.
3. District 18: Leon G. Billings lost renomination to Ana Sol Gutierrez, John Adams Hurson, and Richard Madaleno.
4. District 20: Dana Lee Dembrow lost renomination to Peter Franchot, Sheila E. Hixson, and Gareth E. Murray.
5. District 23A: Joan Breslin Pitkin lost a redistricting race to Mary A. Conroy and James W. Hubbard.
6. District 28: Samuel C. Linton lost renomination to Sally Y. Jameson, Jim Jarboe, and Van Mitchell.
7. District 41: Wendell F. Phillips lost renomination to Jill P. Carter, Nathaniel T. Oaks, and Samuel I. Rosenberg.
8. District 43: Kenneth Montague Jr. lost a redistricting race to Curt Anderson, Ann Marie Doory, and Maggie McIntosh.
9. District 43: Michael V. Dobson lost renomination to Curt Anderson, Ann Marie Doory, and Maggie McIntosh.
10. District 47: William H. Cole IV lost a redistricting race to Peter A. Hammen, Carolyn J. Krysiak, and Brian K. McHale.

==== Republicans ====
1. District 4A: Louise Virginia Snodgrass lost renomination to Paul S. Stull and Joseph R. Bartlett.
2. District 38A: Charles A. McClenahan lost renomination to D. Page Elmore.
3. District 42: Emil B. Pielke lost a redistricting race to John G. Trueschler, Susan L. M. Aumann, and William J. Frank.

=== In general elections ===
==== Democrats ====
1. District 1C: Casper R. Taylor Jr. lost to LeRoy E. Myers Jr.
2. District 7: Nancy M. Hubers lost a redistricting race to Richard Impallaria, J. B. Jennings, and Pat McDonough.
3. District 30: C. Richard D'Amato lost to Michael E. Busch, Virginia P. Clagett, and Herb McMillan.
4. District 31: Mary Rosso lost to Joan Cadden, Don H. Dwyer Jr., and John R. Leopold.
5. District 34A: B. Daniel Riley lost to Charles R. Boutin and Mary-Dulany James.
6. District 36: Wheeler R. Baker and James G. Crouse lost to Michael D. Smigiel Sr., Richard A. Sossi, and Mary Roe Walkup.
7. District 42: James W. Campbell lost to Susan L. M. Aumann, William J. Frank, and John G. Trueschler.

== Predictions ==
Source	Ranking	As of
The Cook; Political Report	Safe D	October 4, 2002

== List of districts ==
All election results are from the Maryland State Board of Elections.

=== District 1A ===
Maryland House of Delegates District 1A election
Party	Candidate	Votes	%
Republican	George C. Edwards (incumbent)	10,303	99.4
Write-in		58	0.6
Republican win (new boundaries)			

=== District 1B ===
Maryland House of Delegates District 1B election
Party	Candidate	Votes	%
Democratic	Kevin Kelly (incumbent)	6,654	55.7
Republican	Tricia Wolfe	5,286	44.3
Write-in		4	0.0
Democratic win (new boundaries)			

=== District 1C ===
Maryland House of Delegates District 1C election
Party	Candidate	Votes	%
Republican	LeRoy E. Myers Jr.	5,657	50.3
Democratic	Casper R. Taylor Jr. (incumbent)	5,581	49.6
Write-in		8	0.1
Republican win (new boundaries)			

=== District 2A ===
Maryland House of Delegates District 2A election
Party	Candidate	Votes	%
Republican	Robert A. McKee (incumbent)	10,223	74.7
Democratic	Peter E. Perini Sr.	3,447	25.2
Write-in		21	0.2
Republican win (new boundaries)			

=== District 2B ===
Maryland House of Delegates District 2B election
Party	Candidate	Votes	%
Republican	Christopher B. Shank (incumbent)	7,749	72.3
Democratic	David M. Russo	2,954	27.6
Write-in		11	0.1
Republican win (new boundaries)			

=== District 2C ===
Maryland House of Delegates District 2C election
Party	Candidate	Votes	%
Democratic	John P. Donoghue (incumbent)	5,185	58.8
Republican	Robert E. Bruchey II	3,611	41.0
Write-in		16	0.2
Democratic win (new boundaries)			

=== District 3A ===
Maryland House of Delegates District 3A election
Party	Candidate	Votes	%
Republican	Patrick N. Hogan	12,066	26.4
Democratic	Galen R. Clagett	11,434	25.0
Democratic	Dick Zimmerman	11,288	24.7
Republican	Timothy W. Brooks	10,782	23.6
Write-in		16	0.2
Democratic win (new boundaries)			
Republican win (new boundaries)			

=== District 3B ===
Maryland House of Delegates District 3B election
Party	Candidate	Votes	%
Republican	Richard B. Weldon Jr.	12,066	26.4
Democratic	Lisa Baugher	5,281	37.4
Write-in		37	0.3
Republican win (new boundaries)			

=== District 4A ===
Maryland House of Delegates District 4A election
Party	Candidate	Votes	%
Republican	Paul S. Stull (incumbent)	16,830	36.3
Republican	Joseph R. Bartlett (incumbent)	14,720	31.7
Democratic	Valerie Moore Dale	7,399	15.9
Democratic	Dick Franklin	6,001	12.9
Republican	Louise Virginia Snodgrass (incumbent, write-in)	1,472	3.2
Write-in		0	0
Republican win (new boundaries)			
Republican win (new boundaries)			

=== District 4B ===
Maryland House of Delegates District 4B election
Party	Candidate	Votes	%
Republican	Donald B. Elliott (incumbent)	10,321	75.7
Democratic	Thomas Henry Morrison	3,297	24.2
Write-in		14	0.1
Republican win (new boundaries)			

=== District 5A ===
Maryland House of Delegates District 5A election
Party	Candidate	Votes	%
Republican	Nancy R. Stocksdale (incumbent)	20,480	36.3
Republican	Carmen M. Amedori (incumbent)	19,195	34.0
Democratic	Robert P. Wack	10,520	18.6
Democratic	Kimberly J. Petry	6,195	11.0
Write-in		49	0.1
Republican win (new boundaries)			
Republican win (new boundaries)			

=== District 5B ===
Maryland House of Delegates District 5B election
Party	Candidate	Votes	%
Republican	Wade Kach (incumbent)	13,122	71.2
Democratic	Stephen C. Kirsch	5,268	28.6
Write-in		48	0.2
Republican win (new boundaries)			

=== District 6 ===
Maryland House of Delegates District 6 election
Party	Candidate	Votes	%
Democratic	Michael H. Weir Jr. (incumbent)	17,958	21.4
Democratic	John S. Arnick (incumbent)	17,541	20.9
Democratic	Joseph J. Minnick (incumbent)	17,530	20.9
Republican	Jane Brooks	12,517	14.9
Republican	Bruce Laing	9,448	11.2
Republican	Paul Michael Blitz	8,969	10.7
Write-in		106	0.1
Democratic win (new boundaries)			
Democratic win (new boundaries)			
Democratic win (new boundaries)			

=== District 7 ===
Maryland House of Delegates District 7 election
Party	Candidate	Votes	%
Republican	J. B. Jennings	22,470	20.4
Republican	Pat McDonough	20,869	18.9
Republican	Richard Impallaria	18,749	17.0
Democratic	Nancy M. Hubers (incumbent)	17,092	15.5
Democratic	Donna M. Felling	14,205	12.9
Democratic	Randy Cogar	13,926	12.6
Libertarian	Michael F. Linder	2,817	2.6
Write-in		80	0.1
Republican win (new boundaries)			
Republican win (new boundaries)			
Republican win (new boundaries)			

=== District 8 ===
Maryland House of Delegates District 8 election
Party	Candidate	Votes	%
Republican	Alfred W. Redmer Jr. (incumbent)	22,884	19.6
Democratic	Eric M. Bromwell	20,314	17.4
Republican	Joseph C. Boteler III	19,826	17.0
Republican	Mike Rupp	18,755	16.1
Democratic	Tim Caslin	18,553	15.9
Democratic	Todd Schuler	16,277	14.0
Write-in		86	0.1
Republican win (new boundaries)			
Republican win (new boundaries)			
Democratic win (new boundaries)			

=== District 9A ===
Maryland House of Delegates District 9A election
Party	Candidate	Votes	%
Republican	Robert L. Flanagan (incumbent)	22,884	33.8
Republican	Gail H. Bates (incumbent)	20,783	33.0
Democratic	Walter E. Carson	10,424	16.6
Democratic	Tony McGuffin	10,423	16.6
Write-in		33	0.1
Republican win (new boundaries)			
Republican win (new boundaries)			

=== District 9B ===
Maryland House of Delegates District 9B election
Party	Candidate	Votes	%
Republican	Susan W. Krebs	10,093	62.0
Democratic	Kenneth Holniker	6,152	37.8
Write-in		27	0.2
Republican win (new boundaries)			

=== District 10 ===
Maryland House of Delegates District 10 election
Party	Candidate	Votes	%
Democratic	Emmett C. Burns Jr. (incumbent)	27,921	31.5
Democratic	Shirley Nathan-Pulliam (incumbent)	26,269	29.7
Democratic	Adrienne A. Jones (incumbent)	25,655	29.0
Republican	Steven D'Arezzo	8,480	9.6
Write-in		254	0.3
Democratic win (new boundaries)			
Democratic win (new boundaries)			
Democratic win (new boundaries)			

=== District 11 ===
Maryland House of Delegates District 11 election
Party	Candidate	Votes	%
Democratic	Robert Zirkin (incumbent)	30,467	23.5
Democratic	Jon S. Cardin	29,480	22.7
Democratic	Dan K. Morhaim (incumbent)	28,098	21.7
Republican	J. Michael Collins Sr.	14,601	11.3
Republican	Betty L. Wagner	13,483	10.4
Republican	Grant Harding	13,411	10.3
Write-in		130	0.1
Democratic win (new boundaries)			
Democratic win (new boundaries)			
Democratic win (new boundaries)			

=== District 12A ===
Maryland House of Delegates District 12A election
Party	Candidate	Votes	%
Democratic	James E. Malone Jr. (incumbent)	15,615	31.8
Democratic	Steven J. DeBoy Sr. (incumbent)	12,376	25.2
Republican	Joe Hooe	11,193	22.8
Republican	Harry Korrell	9,875	20.1
Write-in		24	0.1
Democratic win (new boundaries)			
Democratic win (new boundaries)			

=== District 12B ===
Maryland House of Delegates District 12B election
Party	Candidate	Votes	%
Democratic	Elizabeth Bobo (incumbent)	12,085	96.9
Write-in		393	3.1
Democratic win (new boundaries)			

=== District 13 ===
Maryland House of Delegates District 13 election
Party	Candidate	Votes	%
Democratic	Shane Pendergrass (incumbent)	23,786	21.5
Democratic	Frank S. Turner (incumbent)	21,280	19.2
Democratic	Neil F. Quinter	18,922	17.1
Republican	Mary Beth Tung	16,888	15.2
Republican	Bob Adams	16,452	14.8
Republican	John Stafford	13,482	12.2
Write-in		76	0.1
Democratic win (new boundaries)			
Democratic win (new boundaries)			
Democratic win (new boundaries)			

=== District 14 ===
Maryland House of Delegates District 14 election
Party	Candidate	Votes	%
Democratic	Herman L. Taylor Jr. (incumbent)	21,278	20.1
Democratic	Karen S. Montgomery	20,198	19.1
Democratic	Anne Kaiser	19,978	18.9
Republican	Patricia Cummings	15,260	14.4
Republican	Patricia Anne Faulkner	15,005	14.2
Republican	Jim Goldberg	14,162	13.4
Write-in		67	0.1
Democratic win (new boundaries)			
Democratic win (new boundaries)			
Democratic win (new boundaries)			

=== District 15 ===
Maryland House of Delegates District 15 election
Party	Candidate	Votes	%
Republican	Jean B. Cryor (incumbent)	20,584	18.7
Democratic	Brian Feldman	19,719	17.9
Democratic	Kathleen Dumais	19,246	17.5
Democratic	John Young	17,358	15.8
Republican	Bill Askinazi	16,693	15.2
Republican	Mary Kane	16,579	15.0
Write-in		42	0.0
Democratic win (new boundaries)			
Democratic win (new boundaries)			
Republican win (new boundaries)			

=== District 16 ===
Maryland House of Delegates District 16 election
Party	Candidate	Votes	%
Democratic	Marilyn R. Goldwater (incumbent)	31,440	25.5
Democratic	Susan C. Lee (incumbent)	30,201	24.5
Democratic	William A. Bronrott (incumbent)	30,069	24.4
Republican	Charles Stansfield	13,574	11.0
Republican	Daniel Farhan Zurbairi	12,438	10.1
Independent	John Horan Latham	5,322	4.3
Write-in		109	0.1
Democratic win (new boundaries)			
Democratic win (new boundaries)			
Democratic win (new boundaries)			

=== District 17 ===
Maryland House of Delegates District 17 election
Party	Candidate	Votes	%
Democratic	Michael R. Gordon (incumbent)	20,899	26.4
Democratic	Kumar P. Barve (incumbent)	19,697	24.9
Democratic	Luiz R. S. Simmons (incumbent)	19,412	24.6
Republican	Josephine J. Wang	10,002	12.7
Republican	Paul Nick Hnarakis	8,917	11.3
Write-in		122	0.2
Democratic win (new boundaries)			
Democratic win (new boundaries)			
Democratic win (new boundaries)			

=== District 18 ===
Maryland House of Delegates District 18 election
Party	Candidate	Votes	%
Democratic	Ana Sol Gutierrez	26,279	33.9
Democratic	John Adams Hurson (incumbent)	25,656	33.1
Democratic	Richard Madaleno	25,077	32.3
Write-in		547	0.7
Democratic win (new boundaries)			
Democratic win (new boundaries)			
Democratic win (new boundaries)			

=== District 19 ===
Maryland House of Delegates District 19 election
Party	Candidate	Votes	%
Democratic	Henry B. Heller (incumbent)	26,279	33.9
Democratic	Adrienne A. Mandel (incumbent)	26,081	33.0
Democratic	Carol S. Petzold (incumbent)	25,794	32.7
Write-in		504	0.6
Democratic win (new boundaries)			
Democratic win (new boundaries)			
Democratic win (new boundaries)			

=== District 20 ===
Maryland House of Delegates District 20 election
Party	Candidate	Votes	%
Democratic	Sheila E. Hixson (incumbent)	19,841	26.7
Democratic	Peter Franchot (incumbent)	18,273	24.6
Democratic	Gareth E. Murray	15,803	21.3
Green	Linda Schade	10,101	13.6
Republican	Jae Donald Collins	5,294	7.1
Republican	Kenneth Klein	4,855	6.5
Write-in		96	0.1
Democratic win (new boundaries)			
Democratic win (new boundaries)			
Democratic win (new boundaries)			

=== District 21 ===
Maryland House of Delegates District 21 election
Party	Candidate	Votes	%
Democratic	Barbara A. Frush (incumbent)	14,975	24.9
Democratic	Brian R. Moe (incumbent)	14,742	24.6
Democratic	Pauline Menes (incumbent)	14,657	24.4
Republican	Kevin L. Bruening	8,076	13.5
Republican	Bernadine Shettle	7,450	12.4
Write-in		154	0.3
Democratic win (new boundaries)			
Democratic win (new boundaries)			
Democratic win (new boundaries)			

=== District 22 ===
Maryland House of Delegates District 22 election
Party	Candidate	Votes	%
Democratic	Anne Healey (incumbent)	16,670	30.6
Democratic	Tawanna P. Gaines (incumbent)	15,871	29.1
Democratic	Justin Ross (incumbent)	16,243	29.8
Republican	Dominique J. Brown	5,652	10.4
Write-in		111	0.2
Democratic win (new boundaries)			
Democratic win (new boundaries)			
Democratic win (new boundaries)			

=== District 23A ===
Maryland House of Delegates District 23A election
Party	Candidate	Votes	%
Democratic	Mary A. Conroy (incumbent)	15,979	37.5
Democratic	James W. Hubbard (incumbent)	14,094	33.1
Republican	Kenneth E. Rupert	6,342	14.9
Republican	Day Gardner	6,156	14.4
Write-in		48	0.01
Democratic win (new boundaries)			
Democratic win (new boundaries)			

=== District 23B ===
Maryland House of Delegates District 23B election
Party	Candidate	Votes	%
Democratic	Marvin E. Holmes Jr.	10,674	99.3
Write-in		78	0.7
Democratic win (new boundaries)			

=== District 24 ===
Maryland House of Delegates District 24 election
Party	Candidate	Votes	%
Democratic	Joanne C. Benson (incumbent)	18,125	34.3
Democratic	Michael L. Vaughn	17,333	32.8
Democratic	Carolyn J. B. Howard (incumbent)	17,309	32.7
Write-in		107	0.2
Democratic win (new boundaries)			
Democratic win (new boundaries)			
Democratic win (new boundaries)			

=== District 25 ===
Maryland House of Delegates District 25 election
Party	Candidate	Votes	%
Democratic	Anthony G. Brown (incumbent)	21,350	34.9
Democratic	Melony G. Griffith (incumbent)	20,163	33.0
Democratic	Dereck E. Davis (incumbent)	19,585	32.0
Write-in		69	0.1
Democratic win (new boundaries)			
Democratic win (new boundaries)			
Democratic win (new boundaries)			

=== District 26 ===
Maryland House of Delegates District 26 election
Party	Candidate	Votes	%
Democratic	Veronica L. Turner	22,482	29.8
Democratic	Obie Patterson (incumbent)	21,794	28.9
Democratic	Darryl A. Kelley	21,306	28.2
Republican	JoAnn Fisher	3,675	4.9
Republican	Dale L. Anderson	3,562	4.7
Republican	Max Buff	2,623	3.5
Write-in		38	0.1
Democratic win (new boundaries)			
Democratic win (new boundaries)			
Democratic win (new boundaries)			

=== District 27A ===
Maryland House of Delegates District 27A election
Party	Candidate	Votes	%
Democratic	James E. Proctor Jr. (incumbent)	16,956	37.8
Democratic	Joseph F. Vallario Jr. (incumbent)	16,196	36.2
Republican	Kenneth S. Brown	5,815	13.0
Republican	Albert D. Larsen	5,802	13.0
Write-in		36	0.1
Democratic win (new boundaries)			
Democratic win (new boundaries)			

=== District 27B ===
Maryland House of Delegates District 27B election
Party	Candidate	Votes	%
Democratic	George W. Owings III (incumbent)	9,753	98.1
Write-in		191	1.9
Democratic win (new boundaries)			

=== District 28 ===
Maryland House of Delegates District 28 election
Party	Candidate	Votes	%
Republican	Thomas E. Hutchins (incumbent)	19,037	20.3
Democratic	Sally Y. Jameson	18,476	19.7
Democratic	Van Mitchell (incumbent)	18,238	19.5
Democratic	Jim Jarboe	16,577	17.7
Republican	James Crawford	12,109	12.9
Republican	Robert Boudreaux	9,289	9.9
Write-in		48	0.1
Republican win (new boundaries)			
Democratic win (new boundaries)			
Democratic win (new boundaries)			

=== District 29A ===
Maryland House of Delegates District 29A election
Party	Candidate	Votes	%
Democratic	John F. Wood Jr. (incumbent)	9,816	98.0
Write-in		202	2.0
Democratic win (new boundaries)			

=== District 29B ===
Maryland House of Delegates District 29B election
Party	Candidate	Votes	%
Democratic	John L. Bohanan Jr. (incumbent)	6,340	58.8
Republican	Joseph L. Dick	4,434	41.2
Write-in		2	0.0
Democratic win (new boundaries)			

=== District 29C ===
Maryland House of Delegates District 29C election
Party	Candidate	Votes	%
Republican	Tony O'Donnell (incumbent)	6,027	51.9
Democratic	Pat Buehler	5,586	48.1
Write-in		6	0.1
Republican win (new boundaries)			

=== District 30 ===
Maryland House of Delegates District 30 election
Party	Candidate	Votes	%
Democratic	Michael E. Busch (incumbent)	22,422	17.7
Democratic	Virginia P. Clagett (incumbent)	21,875	17.3
Republican	Herb McMillan	20,972	16.6
Democratic	C. Richard D'Amato (incumbent)	20,545	16.3
Republican	Michael Collins	19,140	15.1
Republican	Nancy Almgren	18,861	14.9
Green	David M. Gross	2,536	2.0
Write-in		71	0.1
Democratic win (new boundaries)			
Democratic win (new boundaries)			
Republican win (new boundaries)			

=== District 31 ===
Maryland House of Delegates District 31 election
Party	Candidate	Votes	%
Republican	John R. Leopold (incumbent)	24,937	24.3
Democratic	Joan Cadden (incumbent)	16,906	16.5
Republican	Don H. Dwyer Jr.	16,807	16.4
Republican	Thomas R. Gardner	15,321	14.9
Democratic	Mary Rosso (incumbent)	15,127	14.8
Democratic	Thomas J. Fleckenstein	13,404	13.1
Write-in		73	0.1
Republican win (new boundaries)			
Democratic win (new boundaries)			
Republican win (new boundaries)			

=== District 32 ===
Maryland House of Delegates District 32 election
Party	Candidate	Votes	%
Republican	James E. Rzepkowski (incumbent)	18,299	19.8
Democratic	Theodore J. Sophocleus (incumbent)	16,842	18.3
Democratic	Mary Ann Love (incumbent)	16,646	18.1
Republican	Robert G. Pepersack Sr.	14,628	15.9
Democratic	Victor A. Sulin	13,694	14.9
Republican	David P. Starr	12,020	13.0
Write-in		82	0.1
Republican win (new boundaries)			
Democratic win (new boundaries)			
Democratic win (new boundaries)			

=== District 33A ===
Maryland House of Delegates District 33A election
Party	Candidate	Votes	%
Republican	David G. Boschert (incumbent)	20,279	33.0
Republican	Tony McConkey	16,157	26.3
Democratic	Jim Snider	11,427	18.6
Democratic	Steve Rizzi	10,939	17.8
Independent	Michael Anthony Lagana	2,622	4.3
Write-in		31	0.1
Republican win (new boundaries)			
Republican win (new boundaries)			

=== District 33B ===
Maryland House of Delegates District 33B election
Party	Candidate	Votes	%
Republican	Robert A. Costa	9,553	54.8
Democratic	Dotty Chaney	7,885	45.2
Write-in		7	0.0
Republican win (new boundaries)			

=== District 34A ===
Maryland House of Delegates District 34A election
Party	Candidate	Votes	%
Republican	Charles Boutin (incumbent)	11,182	34.8
Democratic	Mary-Dulany James (incumbent)	10,947	34.1
Democratic	B. Daniel Riley (incumbent)	9,957	31.0
Write-in		59	0.2
Republican win (new boundaries)			
Democratic win (new boundaries)			

=== District 34B ===
Maryland House of Delegates District 34B election
Party	Candidate	Votes	%
Democratic	David D. Rudolph (incumbent)	6,762	56.3
Republican	William W. Herold Jr.	5,239	43.6
Write-in		6	0.1
Democratic win (new boundaries)			

=== District 35A ===
Maryland House of Delegates District 35A election
Party	Candidate	Votes	%
Republican	Joanne S. Parrott (incumbent)	22,801	50.0
Republican	Barry Glassman (incumbent)	22,463	49.2
Write-in		387	0.9
Republican win (new boundaries)			
Republican win (new boundaries)			

=== District 35B ===
Maryland House of Delegates District 35B election
Party	Candidate	Votes	%
Republican	Susan K. McComas	10,273	61.4
Democratic	David E. Carey	6,444	38.5
Write-in		12	0.1
Republican win (new boundaries)			

=== District 36 ===
Maryland House of Delegates District 36 election
Party	Candidate	Votes	%
Republican	Mary Roe Walkup (incumbent)	28,230	28.0
Republican	Michael D. Smigiel Sr.	19,216	19.1
Republican	Richard A. Sossi	19,098	19.0
Democratic	Wheeler R. Baker (incumbent)	17,575	17.5
Democratic	James G. Crouse (incumbent)	16,329	16.2
Write-in		277	0.3
Republican win (new boundaries)			
Republican win (new boundaries)			
Republican win (new boundaries)			

=== District 37A ===
Maryland House of Delegates District 37A election
Party	Candidate	Votes	%
Democratic	Rudolph C. Cane (incumbent)	4,774	56.5
Republican	Doug Scott	3,673	43.4
Write-in		9	0.1
Democratic win (new boundaries)			

=== District 37B ===
Maryland House of Delegates District 37B election
Party	Candidate	Votes	%
Republican	Adelaide C. Eckardt (incumbent)	21,100	50.2
Republican	Kenneth D. Schisler (incumbent)	20,718	49.3
Write-in		200	0.5
Republican win (new boundaries)			
Republican win (new boundaries)			

=== District 38A ===
Maryland House of Delegates District 38A election
Party	Candidate	Votes	%
Republican	D. Page Elmore	6,811	55.7
Democratic	Kirk G. Simpkins	5,396	44.2
Write-in		12	0.1
Republican win (new boundaries)			

=== District 38B ===
Maryland House of Delegates District 38B election
Party	Candidate	Votes	%
Democratic	Bennett Bozman (incumbent)	15,357	29.7
Democratic	Norman Conway (incumbent)	14,334	27.7
Republican	Jeanne Lynch	12,204	23.6
Republican	Jack Lord	12,204	23.6
Write-in		26	0.1
Democratic win (new boundaries)			
Democratic win (new boundaries)			

=== District 39 ===
Maryland House of Delegates District 39 election
Party	Candidate	Votes	%
Democratic	Charles E. Barkley (incumbent)	16,509	20.6
Democratic	Nancy J. King	16,477	20.6
Democratic	Joan F. Stern (incumbent)	15,461	19.3
Republican	Robert J. Smith	10,490	13.1
Republican	Kyle Winkfield	10,086	12.6
Republican	Bill Witham	9,027	11.3
Independent	Bill White	1,846	2.3
Write-in		73	0.1
Democratic win (new boundaries)			
Democratic win (new boundaries)			
Democratic win (new boundaries)			

=== District 40 ===
Maryland House of Delegates District 40 election
Party	Candidate	Votes	%
Democratic	Pete Rawlings (incumbent)	15,859	34.8
Democratic	Tony E. Fulton (incumbent)	15,162	33.3
Democratic	Salima Siler Marriott (incumbent)	14,339	31.5
Write-in		167	0.4
Democratic win (new boundaries)			
Democratic win (new boundaries)			
Democratic win (new boundaries)			

=== District 41 ===
Maryland House of Delegates District 41 election
Party	Candidate	Votes	%
Democratic	Jill P. Carter	22,643	35.2
Democratic	Samuel I. Rosenberg (incumbent)	21,146	32.9
Democratic	Nathaniel T. Oaks (incumbent)	20,335	31.6
Write-in		204	0.3
Democratic win (new boundaries)			
Democratic win (new boundaries)			
Democratic win (new boundaries)			

=== District 42 ===
Maryland House of Delegates District 42 election
Party	Candidate	Votes	%
Republican	John G. Trueschler	21,591	17.4
Republican	Susan L. M. Aumann	21,326	17.2
Republican	William J. Frank	20,881	16.9
Democratic	Stephen W. Lafferty	18,958	15.3
Democratic	James W. Campbell (incumbent)	18,168	14.7
Democratic	Matthew Joseph	17,478	14.1
Green	Rick Kunkel	5,464	4.4
Write-in		66	0.1
Republican win (new boundaries)			
Republican win (new boundaries)			
Republican win (new boundaries)			

=== District 43 ===
Maryland House of Delegates District 43 election
Party	Candidate	Votes	%
Democratic	Maggie McIntosh (incumbent)	21,993	32.1
Democratic	Curt Anderson	21,131	30.8
Democratic	Ann Marie Doory (incumbent)	19,999	29.2
Republican	John A. Heath	5,243	7.6
Write-in		249	0.4
Democratic win (new boundaries)			
Democratic win (new boundaries)			
Democratic win (new boundaries)			

=== District 44 ===
Maryland House of Delegates District 44 election
Party	Candidate	Votes	%
Democratic	Ruth M. Kirk (incumbent)	14,102	33.0
Democratic	Keith E. Haynes	12,607	29.5
Democratic	Jeffrey A. Paige (incumbent)	12,068	28.3
Republican	Arthur W. Cuffie Jr.	1,874	4.4
Republican	James E. Peters Jr.	1,729	4.1
Write-in		310	0.7
Democratic win (new boundaries)			
Democratic win (new boundaries)			
Democratic win (new boundaries)			

=== District 45 ===
Maryland House of Delegates District 45 election
Party	Candidate	Votes	%
Democratic	Clarence "Tiger" Davis (incumbent)	16,049	31.2
Democratic	Hattie N. Harrison (incumbent)	15,747	28.3
Democratic	Talmadge Branch (incumbent)	15,501	30.2
Republican	Roxcelanna Nia Redmond	4,055	7.9
Write-in		58	0.1
Democratic win (new boundaries)			
Democratic win (new boundaries)			
Democratic win (new boundaries)			

=== District 46 ===
Maryland House of Delegates District 46 election
Party	Candidate	Votes	%
Democratic	Carolyn J. Krysiak (incumbent)	14,560	29.9
Democratic	Brian K. McHale (incumbent)	14,142	29.1
Democratic	Peter A. Hammen (incumbent)	14,064	28.9
Republican	L. Patrick Dail	5,768	11.9
Write-in		118	0.2
Democratic win (new boundaries)			
Democratic win (new boundaries)			
Democratic win (new boundaries)			

=== District 47 ===
Maryland House of Delegates District 47 election
Party	Candidate	Votes	%
Democratic	Rosetta C. Parker	12,134	34.8
Democratic	Doyle Niemann	11,406	32.7
Democratic	Victor R. Ramirez	11,284	32.3
Write-in		90	0.3
Democratic win (new boundaries)			
Democratic win (new boundaries)			
Democratic win (new boundaries)			
