= 422nd Maryland General Assembly =

2006 regular session of the Maryland General Assembly

The 422nd Maryland General Assembly convened in a special session on June 14, 2006, met on June 15, 2006, and did not meet again until it adjourned sine die on June 23, 2006. The entire special session covered only three calendar days.

== Senate ==
=== Party composition ===
Affiliation	Members
Democratic Party	33
Republican Party	14
Total	47

=== Leadership ===
Position	Name	Party	District
President of the Senate	Thomas V. "Mike" Miller Jr.	Democratic	27
President pro tem		Democratic	45
Majority Leader	Nathaniel J. McFadden	Democratic	12

=== Members ===
District	Name	Party
1	John J. Hafer	Republican
2	Donald F. Munson	Republican
3	Alex Mooney	Republican
4	David R. Brinkley	Republican
5	Larry E. Haines	Republican
6	Norman R. Stone Jr.	Democratic
7	Andy Harris	Republican
8	Katherine A. Klausmeier	Democratic
9	Allan H. Kittleman	Republican
10	Delores G. Kelley	Democratic
11	Robert Zirkin	Democratic
12	Edward J. Kasemeyer	Democratic
13	James N. Robey	Democratic
14	Rona E. Kramer	Democratic
15	Robert J. Garagiola	Democratic
16	Brian Frosh	Democratic
17	Jennie M. Forehand	Democratic
18	Sharon M. Grosfeld	Democratic
19	Leonard H. Teitelbaum	Democratic
20	Ida G. Ruben	Democratic
21	James Rosapepe	Democratic
22	Paul G. Pinsky	Democratic
23	Leo E. Green	Democratic
24	Nathaniel Exum	Democratic
25	Ulysses Curry	Democratic
26	Gloria G. Lawlah	Democratic
27	Thomas V. "Mike" Miller Jr.	Democratic
28	Thomas M. Middleton	Democratic
29	Roy P. Dyson	Democratic
30	John Astle	Democratic
31	Bryan Simonaire	Republican
32	James E. DeGrange Sr.	Democratic
33	Janet Greenip	Republican
34	Nancy Jacobs	Republican
35	J. Robert Hooper	Republican
36	E. J. Pipkin	Republican
37	Richard F. Colburn	Republican
38	J. Lowell Stoltzfus	Republican
39	Patrick J. Hogan	Democratic
40	Ralph M. Hughes	Democratic
41	Lisa Gladden	Democratic
42	James Brochin	Democratic
43	Joan Carter Conway	Democratic
44	Verna L. Jones	Democratic
45	Nathaniel J. McFadden	Democratic
46	George W. Della Jr.	Democratic
47	Gwendolyn T. Britt	Democratic

== House of Delegates ==
=== Party composition ===
Affiliation	Members
Democratic Party	104
Republican Party	37
Unaffiliated	0
Total	141
Government majority	67

=== Leadership ===
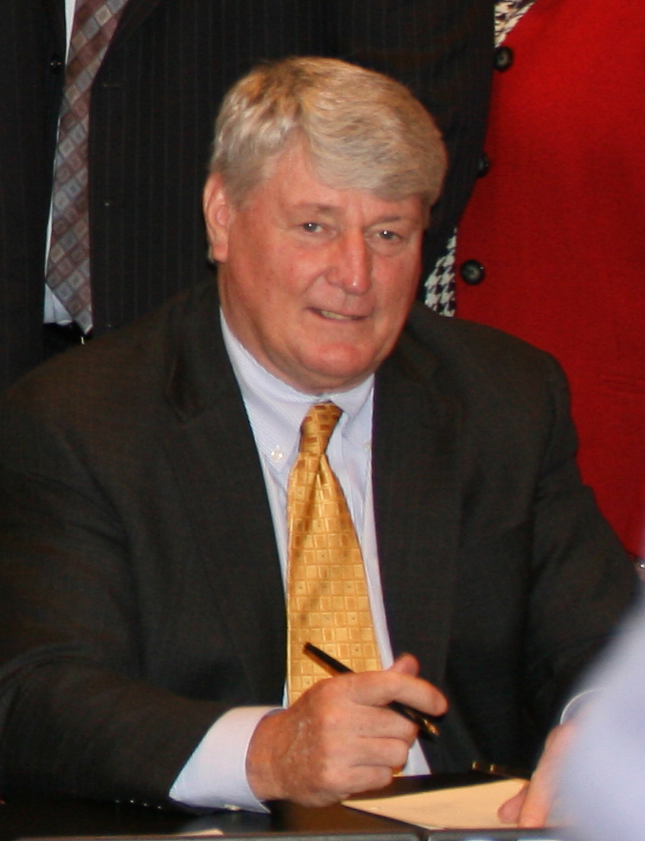
Michael E. Busch, House Speaker

Position	Name	Party	District
Speaker of the House	Michael E. Busch	Democratic	30
Speaker Pro Tempore	Adrienne A. Jones	Democratic	10
Majority Leader	Kumar P. Barve	Democratic	17
Majority Whip	Talmadge Branch	Democratic	45
Minority Leader	George C. Edwards	Republican	29C
Minority Whip	Tony O'Donnell	Republican	2B

=== Members ===
District	Name	Party
1A	George C. Edwards	Republican
1B	Kevin Kelly	Democratic
1C	LeRoy E. Myers Jr.	Republican
2A	Robert A. McKee	Republican
2B	Christopher B. Shank	Republican
2C	John P. Donoghue	Democratic
3A	Galen R. Clagett	Democratic
3A	Patrick N. Hogan	Republican
3B	Richard B. Weldon Jr.	Republican
4A	Joseph R. Bartlett	Republican
4A	Paul S. Stull	Republican
4B	Donald B. Elliott	Republican
5A	Tanya Thornton Shewell	Republican
5A	Nancy R. Stocksdale	Republican
5B	Wade Kach	Republican
6	John S. Arnick	Democratic
6	Joseph J. Minnick	Democratic
6	Michael H. Weir Jr.	Democratic
7	Richard Impallaria	Republican
7	J. B. Jennings	Republican
7	Pat McDonough	Republican
8	Joseph C. Boteler III	Republican
8	Eric M. Bromwell	Democratic
8	John W. E. Cluster Jr.	Republican
9A	Gail H. Bates	Republican
9A	Warren E. Miller	Republican
9B	Susan W. Krebs	Republican
10	Emmett C. Burns Jr.	Democratic
10	Adrienne A. Jones	Democratic
10	Shirley Nathan-Pulliam	Democratic
11	Jon S. Cardin	Democratic
11	Dan K. Morhaim	Democratic
11	Robert A. Zirkin	Democratic
12A	Steven J. DeBoy Sr.	Democratic
12A	James E. Malone Jr.	Democratic
12B	Elizabeth Bobo	Democratic
13	Shane Pendergrass	Democratic
13	Neil F. Quinter	Democratic
13	Frank S. Turner	Democratic
14	Anne Kaiser	Democratic
14	Karen S. Montgomery	Democratic
14	Herman L. Taylor Jr.	Democratic
15	Jean B. Cryor	Republican
15	Kathleen Dumais	Democratic
15	Brian Feldman	Democratic
16	William A. Bronrott	Democratic
16	Marilyn R. Goldwater	Democratic
16	Susan C. Lee	Democratic
17	Kumar P. Barve	Democratic
17	Michael R. Gordon	Democratic
17	Luiz R. S. Simmons	Democratic
18	Ana Sol Gutierrez	Democratic
18	John Adams Hurson	Democratic
18	Richard Madaleno	Democratic
19	Henry B. Heller	Democratic
19	Adrienne A. Mandel	Democratic
19	Carol S. Petzold	Democratic
20	Peter Franchot	Democratic
20	Sheila E. Hixson	Democratic
20	Gareth E. Murray	Democratic
21	Barbara A. Frush	Democratic
21	Pauline H. Menes	Democratic
21	Brian R. Moe	Democratic
22	Tawanna P. Gaines	Democratic
22	Anne Healey	Democratic
22	Justin Ross	Democratic
23A	Mary A. Conroy	Democratic
23A	James W. Hubbard	Democratic
23B	Marvin E. Holmes Jr.	Democratic
24	Joanne C. Benson	Democratic
24	Carolyn J. B. Howard	Democratic
24	Michael L. Vaughn	Democratic
25	Anthony Brown	Democratic
25	Dereck E. Davis	Democratic
25	Melony G. Griffith	Democratic
26	Darryl A. Kelley	Democratic
26	Obie Patterson	Democratic
26	Veronica L. Turner	Democratic
27A	James E. Proctor Jr.	Democratic
27A	Joseph F. Vallario Jr.	Democratic
27B	Sue Kullen	Democratic
28	W. Louis Hennessy	Republican
28	Sally Y. Jameson	Democratic
28	Murray D. Levy	Democratic
29A	John F. Wood Jr.	Democratic
29B	John L. Bohanan Jr.	Democratic
29C	Tony O'Donnell	Republican
30	Michael E. Busch	Democratic
30	Virginia P. Clagett	Democratic
30	Herbert H. McMillan	Republican
31	Joan Cadden	Democratic
31	Don H. Dwyer Jr.	Republican
31	John R. Leopold	Republican
32	Terry R. Gilleland Jr.	Republican
32	Mary Ann Love	Democratic
32	Theodore J. Sophocleus	Democratic
33A	David G. Boschert	Republican
33A	Tony McConkey	Republican
33B	Robert A. Costa	Republican
34A	Charles Boutin	Republican
34A	Mary-Dulany James	Democratic
34B	David D. Rudolph	Democratic
35A	Barry Glassman	Republican
35A	Joanne S. Parrott	Republican
35B	Susan K. McComas	Republican
36	Michael D. Smigiel Sr.	Republican
36	Richard A. Sossi	Republican
36	Mary Roe Walkup	Republican
37A	Rudolph C. Cane	Democratic
37B	Adelaide C. Eckardt	Republican
37B	Jeannie Haddaway-Riccio	Republican
38A	D. Page Elmore	Republican
38B	Bennett Bozman	Democratic
38B	Norman Conway	Democratic
39	Charles E. Barkley	Democratic
39	Nancy J. King	Democratic
39	Joan F. Stern	Democratic
40	Tony E. Fulton	Democratic
40	Marshall T. Goodwin	Democratic
40	Salima Siler Marriott	Democratic
41	Jill P. Carter	Democratic
41	Nathaniel T. Oaks	Democratic
41	Samuel I. Rosenberg	Democratic
42	Susan L. M. Aumann	Republican
42	William J. Frank	Republican
42	John G. Trueschler	Republican
43	Curt Anderson	Democratic
43	Ann Marie Doory	Democratic
43	Maggie McIntosh	Democratic
44	Keith E. Haynes	Democratic
44	Ruth M. Kirk	Democratic
44	Jeffrey A. Paige	Democratic
45	Talmadge Branch	Democratic
45	Clarence Davis	Democratic
45	Hattie N. Harrison	Democratic
46	Peter A. Hammen	Democratic
46	Carolyn J. Krysiak	Democratic
46	Brian K. McHale	Democratic
47	Doyle Niemann	Democratic
47	Rosetta C. Parker	Democratic
47	Victor R. Ramirez	Democratic

== See also ==
- List of current members of the Maryland Senate
- List of Maryland General Assemblies
