= Chris West (politician) =

American politician (born 1950)

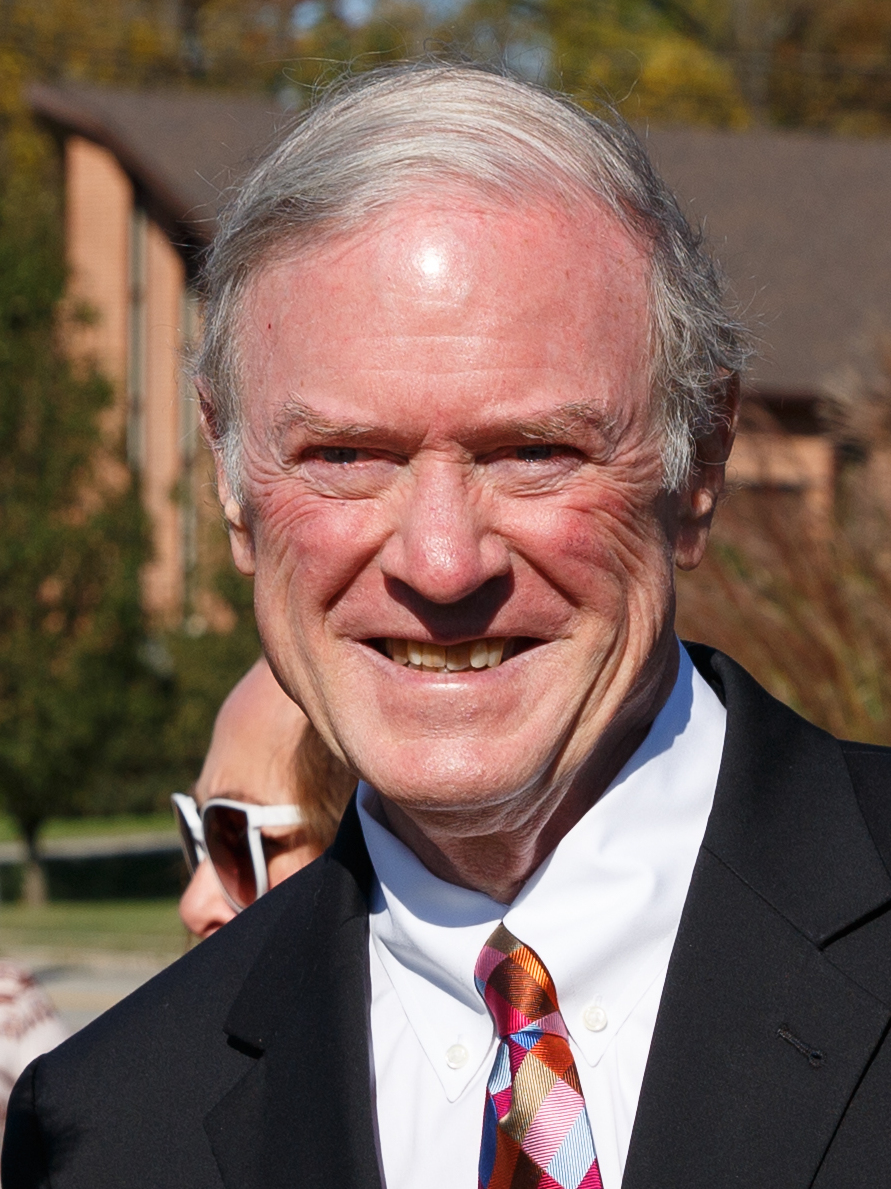
- West in 2025

Member of the Maryland Senate from the 42nd district
- Incumbent
- Assumed office January 9, 2019
- Preceded by: James Brochin

Member of the Maryland House of Delegates from the 42B district
- In office January 14, 2015 – January 9, 2019 Serving with Susan L. M. Aumann
- Preceded by: Stephen W. Lafferty; William J. Frank
- Succeeded by: Michele Guyton; Nino Mangione

Personal details
- Born: April 7, 1950 (age 76) Baltimore, Maryland, U.S.
- Party: Republican
- Spouse: Anne
- Children: 1
- Education: Williams College (BS); University of Pennsylvania (JD)
- Profession: Lawyer

Christopher R. West (born April 7, 1950) is an American politician from Maryland from the Republican party. He is a member of the Maryland Senate from the 42nd district, representing Central and Northern Baltimore County. He was previously a member of the Maryland House of Delegates from District 42B.

== Early life and career ==
West was born on April 7, 1950, in Baltimore, Maryland. He attended Williams College, where he earned a B.A. degree in 1972, and the University of Pennsylvania School of Law, where he earned a J.D. degree in 1975. He was admitted to the Maryland Bar in 1975.

West became involved in politics by working as an attorney for the Maryland Republican Party from 1982 to 1996, and again from 1998 to 2003 after serving as the executive director of the Republican State Central Committee for two years. In 1988, he filed to run for Delegate to the Republican National Convention, representing Jack Kemp. He came in tenth place in a field of 13 candidates, receiving one percent of the vote. During the 1994 Maryland gubernatorial election, West represented the Maryland Republican Party in a lawsuit challenging the results of the election.

In 1997, Semmes, Bowen & Semmes named West as a resident counsel in its Baltimore offices. He operated the commercial lending practice of the firm's banking, corporate, and securities practice group.

In 1998, West was seen as a possible candidate to succeed Joyce Lyons Terhes, who had announced that she would not seek re-election as the state's GOP chairman after a series of key losses across the state. He was once again considered a possible candidate for the seat after chairman Richard D. Bennett announced his resignation at the end of the year. He sought election as Chairman of the Maryland Republican Party that year, but was defeated by Michael Steele, the party's first vice chairman.

In February 2003, Governor Robert Ehrlich appointed West to the Maryland State Arts Council. He served as the council's vice-chair from 2006 to 2007.

In April 2013, West filed to run for the Maryland House of Delegates in District 42B. During the primary, there were attempts to recruit West to switch to the Senate race and challenge James Brochin, but he refused, saying that he had "no plans to switch over and run for State Senate." He won the Republican primary with 35.2 percent of the vote, coming second to Susan L. M. Aumann. He defeated Democrats Robert Leonard and Craig J. Little in the general election, receiving 33.3 percent of the vote.

== In the legislature ==
West was sworn into the Maryland House of Delegates on January 14, 2015. He was a member of the Health and Government Operations Committee from 2015 to 2019.

After Senator Jim Brochin announced that he would run to replace Baltimore County Executive Kevin Kamenetz, West announced he would run to succeed Brochin in the Senate. He ran on a slate with Republican Nino Mangione, who was running for House of Delegates. He defeated Robbie Leonard in the general election with 51.0 percent of the vote. West raised the third most funds out of every other senator for his 2018 campaign, raking in a total $443,283 during the 2018 election cycle.

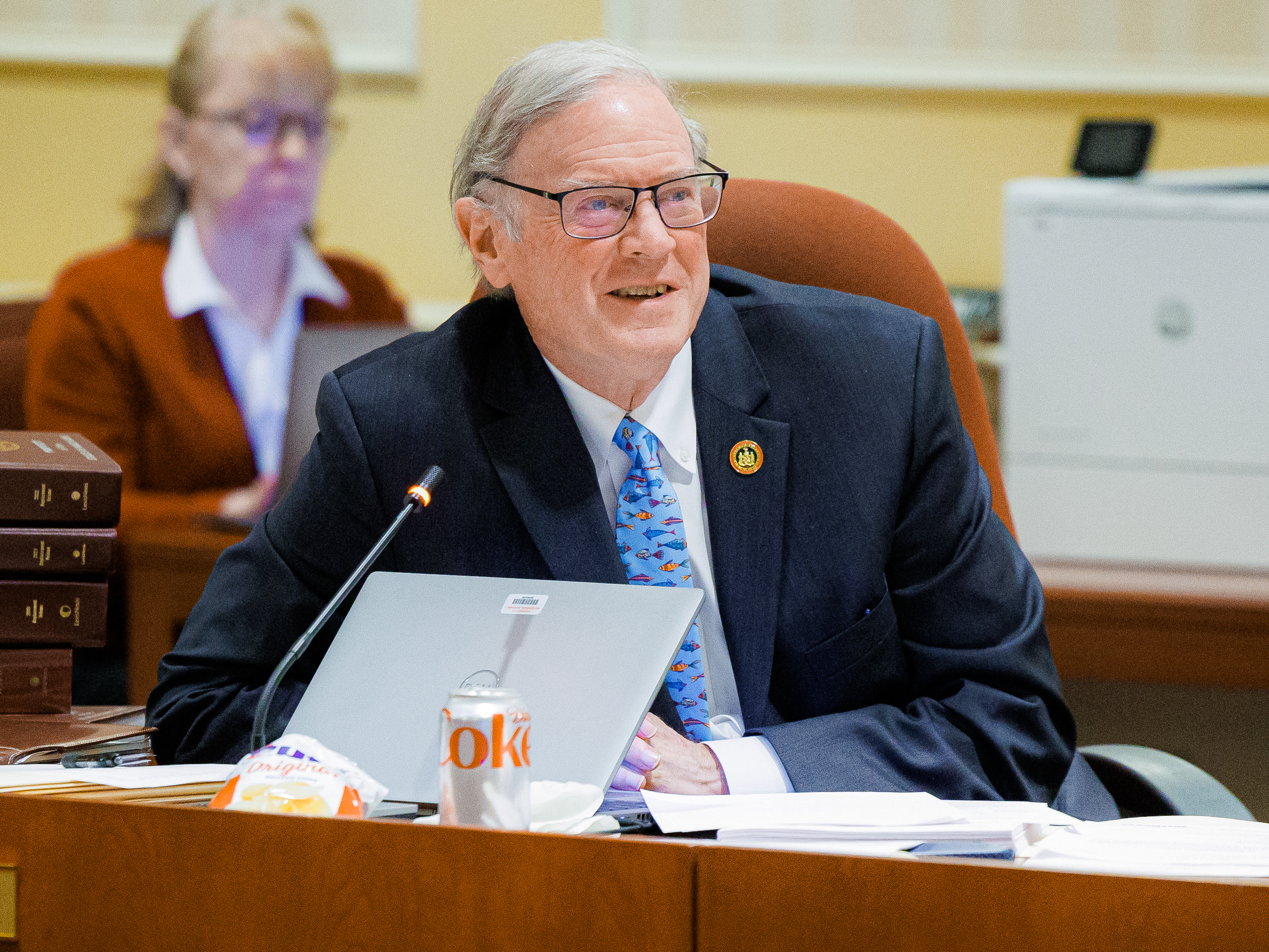
West in the Senate Judicial Proceedings Committee, 2025

West was sworn into the Maryland Senate on January 9, 2019. He served as a member of the Judicial Proceedings Committee from 2019 to 2027. From 2020 to 2027, he served as the caucus parliamentarian of the Maryland Senate Republican Caucus.

In August 2023, West announced that he would not run for re-election in 2026. He endorsed Adam Wood, the former executive director of the Maryland Republican Party, in the Republican primary to succeed him.

== Political positions ==
West has a reputation for being "far and away the most moderate Republican in the General Assembly." Although he represents a conservative district, he often works with the Maryland General Assembly's Democratic majority to compromise on and pass legislation. In January 2020, the American Conservative Union gave West a score of 40 percent on its annual legislative scorecard, the lowest score among Republicans.

=== COVID-19 pandemic ===
In June 2021, West signed onto a letter that urged Governor Larry Hogan to use federal rent relief funding support legislation that would provide low-income tenants with access to legal representation in eviction cases. In August 2021, West signed onto a letter calling on the Maryland State Board of Education to issue a universal masking mandate for students and teachers across the state in response to the COVID-19 pandemic. He was the only Republican to sign onto the letter.

=== Crime and policing ===
During the 2020 legislative session, West introduced a bill that would end the practice of suspending driver's licenses for unpaid court fines and fees. The bill passed unanimously and became law on May 8, 2020. During the 2021 legislative session, he introduced the Juvenile Restoration Act, a bill that would abolish life without parole for those who committed crimes as juveniles and allow those who have served 20 years or more to petition to a judge for release. The bill passed with bipartisan support, but was vetoed by Governor Larry Hogan in April 2021. The legislature voted to override Hogan's veto on the bill a few days later.

During the 2021 legislative session, West introduced legislation in the 2021 legislative session that would prohibit law enforcement agencies from purchasing certain military equipment through the 1033 program. The bill passed unanimously in the Senate, but did not receive a vote in the House of Delegates. He also voted in favor of legislation that would repeal the Law Enforcement Officers' Bill of Rights after two of his amendments—one that would insert portions of the Senate's Law Enforcement Officers' Bill of Rights repeal into the House version bill, and another that would establish that law enforcement agencies have the burden of proof under a preponderance of the evidence during trial board proceedings and that officers can only be disciplined for cause—made it into the bill. West co-sponsored legislation that would order police departments to provide body-worn cameras for on-duty police officers by 2025. However, he withdrew his support for the body cameras bill after it was amended to include provisions that would create an employee assistance mental health program and implement a statewide use of force policy. He opposed provisions in "Anton's Law" that would allow police misconduct complaints to become public, introducing an amendment that would keep unsubstantiated complaints private. The amendment was rejected on a party line vote.

During the 2026 legislative session, West opposed a bill that would ban law enforcement officers from wearing face coverings, saying there could be conflicts between state officers enforcing the law and federal officers doing their duties under federal law. During debate on the bill on the Senate floor, he introduced an amendment to lower the penalty for wearing a face mask from $1,500 to $100, which was rejected in a voice vote. West also supported a bill that would end the practice of charging juveniles as adults in criminal court.

=== Economic issues ===
During the 2016 legislative session, West introduced legislation to ban off-track betting at the Maryland State Fairgrounds. He later amended the bill to allow off-track betting, but required that the Fairgrounds enter a contract agreement with the Greater Timonium Community Council, and banned slots and table games. During the 2020 legislative session, West introduced a bill to legalize sports betting in Maryland's casinos and pari-mutuel racetracks.

In 2019, following the legislature's vote on a bill that would raise the state's minimum wage to $15 an hour by 2025, West agreed to participate in a work group proposed by Democratic Senator Katie Fry Hester that looked to study ways to help small businesses in the years leading up to the bill's full effective date.

=== Environment ===
In April 2019, West voted against legislation that would mandate a 50 percent renewable energy target for 2030 over his disapproval of a provision that would provide trash incinerators with renewable energy subsidies.

In December 2019, the Maryland Public Interest Research Group gave West a score of 83 percent on its annual legislative scorecard.

During the 2021 legislative session, West introduced legislation that would create timelines for Maryland's remaining power plants to transition away from coal and establish a transition fund to mitigate economic impacts for employees. He later withdrew the bill over worries that it would not pass in the House, but announced in March 2021 that he had worked out a deal with AES Corporation that would cause the Warrior Run Generating Station to stop burning coal in 2030.

West introduced an amendment to the Climate Solutions Now Act of 2021 that would require newly constructed school buildings that use funding from the Build to Learn Act to install rooftop solar panels. The amendment failed by a vote of 15–31. He was also one of two Senate Republicans to vote in favor of passing the climate action plan, which passed the Senate by a vote of 34–11.

In March 2022, West introduced an amendment to the Climate Solutions Now Act of 2022 that would require local school systems to consider installing solar panels on roofs of new school buildings, requiring school systems that decide against doing so to explain why to the Interagency Commission on School Construction. The amendment was passed in a 30–14 vote.

=== Marijuana ===
West does not support the legalization of marijuana, saying that he would oppose it until a method to test people for being under the influence of marijuana is developed. West introduced legislation in the 2019 legislative session that would limit companies to operating up to six marijuana dispensaries through ownership or management agreements. The bill passed and was signed into law at a limit of four dispensaries.

West introduced legislation in the 2020 legislative session that would allow actively licensed physicians to become a certifying provider of medical marijuana. The bill passed unanimously and became law on May 8, 2020.

=== National politics ===
In October 2025, West said he agreed with state delegate Lauren Arikan's criticism that the attorney general of Maryland's lawsuits against the Trump administration were "politically motivated more than policy motivated", but conceded that Republican attorneys general often sued the Biden administration in a similar manner. He also added that he hoped that attorneys general, both Democratic and Republican, would focus more on their constituents and less on national politics.

In February 2026, West said he opposed pursuing mid-decade redistricting in Maryland and opposed holding a vote on a bill that would redraw Maryland's congressional districts to improve the Democratic Party's chances of winning the 1st congressional district, the only congressional district held by Republicans in the state.

=== Social issues ===
West supports banning abortions after a fetus reaches fetal viability unless the mother's life is at risk.

In 2019, West voted in favor of legislation that would make it legal for doctors to prescribe a lethal dose of medication to terminally ill patients who want to end their lives. The bill failed to pass out of the Senate, receiving a 23–23 vote. West was the only Republican to vote in favor of the bill.

During the 2020 legislative session, West introduced a bill that would require agencies to provide a voter application form and general voting information to people preparing to transition back to society from prison. The bill passed the House of Delegates by a vote of 93–36.

In February 2020, West co-sponsored legislation that would make single-occupant bathrooms gender neutral. In February 2021, West cosponsored legislation that would provide students with access to period products in school bathrooms. The bill passed and became law on May 30, 2021.

In August 2020, West signed onto a letter calling on the Baltimore County Public Schools system to ban hate symbols in the form of Confederate Flags and swastikas. During the 2021 legislative session, he introduced a bill to create penalties for vandalizing or destroying historically significant statues in Maryland.

== Personal life ==
West is a congregant and former senior warden at the Emmanuel Episcopal Church.

== Electoral history ==
Delegates to the Republican National Convention, District 2, 1988
Party	Candidate	Votes	%
Republican	Helen Delich Bentley (George Bush)	15,521	24%
Republican	A. Wade Kach (George Bush)	8,023	12%
Republican	Alfred W. Redmer Jr. (George Bush)	7,467	11%
Republican	George Price (Robert J. Dole)	4,688	7%
Republican	Ellen R. Sauerbrey (Jack Kemp)	2,535	4%
Republican	Robert T. Petr (Pat Robertson)	1,704	3%
Republican	Scott Sewell	1,510	2%
Republican	Gary D. Snyder (Pat Robertson)	1,497	2%
Republican	Virginia G. Schuster	941	1%
Republican	Christopher R. West (Jack Kemp)	830	1%
Republican	Lloyd W. Reynolds	654	1%
Republican	Gregory John Ullmann	613	1%
Republican	John Tower (Pierre Du Pont)	550	1%

Maryland House of Delegates District 42B Republican Primary Election, 2014
Party	Candidate	Votes	%
Republican	Susan L. Aumann	3,987	40.2%
Republican	Chris West	3,499	35.2%
Republican	Joseph C. Boteler III	1,912	19.3%
Republican	Jesse Filamor	531	5.3%

Maryland House of Delegates District 42B General Election, 2014
Party	Candidate	Votes	%
Republican	Susan L. Aumann	23,193	38.8%
Republican	Chris West	19,932	33.3%
Democratic	Robert Leonard	8,932	14.9%
Democratic	Craig J. Little	7,677	12.8%
N/A	Other Write-Ins	79	0.1%

Maryland Senate District 42 Republican Primary Election, 2018
Party	Candidate	Votes	%
Republican	Chris West	6,798	100.0%

Maryland Senate District 42 General Election, 2018
Party	Candidate	Votes	%
Republican	Chris West	29,100	51.0%
Democratic	Robbie Leonard	27,949	49.0%
N/A	Other Write-Ins	46	0.1%
