= James Brochin =

American politician (born 1964)

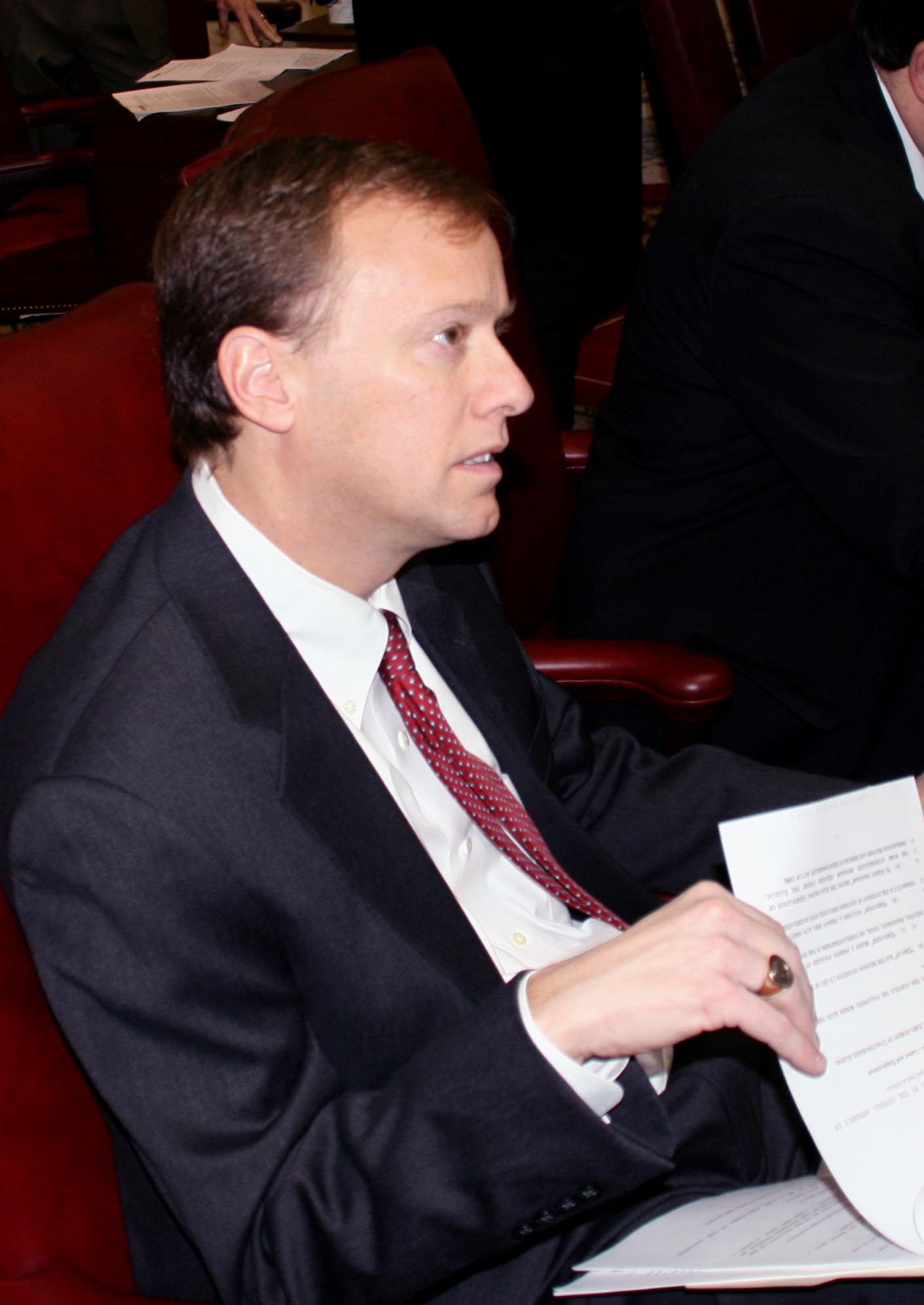
- Brochin in 2009

Member of the Maryland Senate from the 42nd district
- In office January 8, 2003 – January 9, 2019
- Preceded by: Barbara A. Hoffman
- Succeeded by: Chris West

Personal details
- Born: February 22, 1964 (age 62) Baltimore, Maryland, U.S.
- Party: Democratic
- Children: 1
- Education: University of North Carolina at Greensboro (BA); University of Maryland, College Park (MA)
- Occupation: Insurance broker

James Brochin (born February 22, 1964) is an American politician who was a member of the Maryland Senate representing the 42nd district in Baltimore County from 2003 to 2019. He unsuccessfully ran for Baltimore County Executive in 2018, placing second behind former state delegate Johnny Olszewski in the Democratic primary by a margin of 17 votes.

== Early life and education ==
Brochin was born in Baltimore on February 22, 1964, to father Arnold Brochin and mother Carol Ginsburg. After graduating from Pikesville High School, he attended the University of North Carolina at Greensboro, where he earned a Bachelor of Arts degree in political science in 1986. Brochin earned his Master of Arts degree in political science from the University of Maryland, College Park in 1990.

== Early career ==
Brochin worked as a legislative analyst for Maryland Senate President Thomas V. Miller Jr. in 1989, afterwards working as a lobbyist for Baltimore County from 1990 to 1991 and a senior political writer for Baltimore Magazine from 1994 to 2001. He was also a political science instructor at the Community College of Baltimore County's Catonsville campus from 1990 to 1998 and at Towson University since 1994. During the 1994 Maryland gubernatorial election, Brochin was the campaign manager for state senator American Joe Miedusiewski's gubernatorial campaign. Since 2000, he has worked as an insurance broker.

== Maryland Senate ==
=== Elections ===
Brochin ran for the Maryland Senate in the 9th district in 2002, seeking to unseat Republican state senator Andy Harris. He was redrawn into the 42nd district after the Maryland Court of Appeals issued a ruling redrawing the state's legislative maps. Brochin engaged in a door-knocking campaign for nearly three years leading up to the election, in which he defeated Republican state delegate Martha Scanlan Klima in the general election with 50.99 percent of the vote.

Brochin ran for re-election to a second term in 2006, in which he defeated Republican challenger Douglas B. Riley. He was reelected to a third term in 2010 after defeating Republican challenger Kevin Carney.

During his 2014 re-election campaign, Brochin was challenged by former state delegate Connie DeJuliis, who ran as a progressive. That year, he claimed that Governor Martin O'Malley and Democratic leaders of the Maryland General Assembly had redrawn his district with the hopes that he would lose his re-election bid to a Republican, citing his vote for a bill introduced by former Republican Governor Bob Ehrlich to give the state control of Baltimore City schools. In May 2014, DeJuliis's husband, state labor commissioner Ron DeJuliis, was charged with stealing Brochin's campaign signs. After defeating DeJuliis in the Democratic primary election with 69.4 percent of the vote, Brochin won reelection with 51.6 percent of the vote against Republican challenger Tim Robinson.

=== Tenure ===
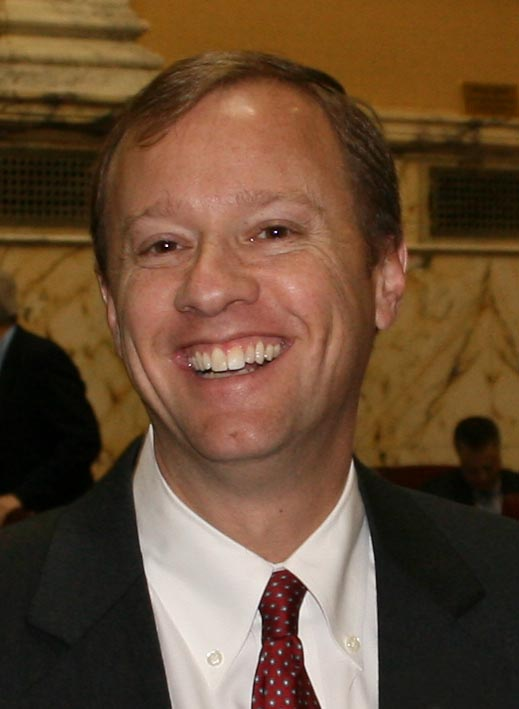
Brochin in 2009

Brochin was sworn into the Maryland Senate on January 8, 2003. He has described himself as a centrist with socially liberal views, while The Baltimore Sun has described him as an independent and conservative-leaning Democrat and as one of the most conservative Democratic members of the Maryland Senate. Brochin was a member of the Judicial Proceedings Committee from 2003 to 2004, afterwards serving on the Education, Health, and Environmental Affairs Committee until 2007, after which he returned to the Judicial Proceedings Committee for the remainder of his tenure. From 2016 to 2019, Brochin served as the chair of the Baltimore County Delegation.

== 2018 Baltimore County Executive campaign ==
In November 2016, Brochin told The Baltimore Sun that he was considering a run for Baltimore County Executive in 2018. He announced his candidacy on October 19, 2017, seeking to succeed Kevin Kamenetz, who was term limited. During the Democratic primary, he campaigned for increased funding for college and career readiness programs in schools, more treatment options for heroin addicts, and against what he called "development interests" in Baltimore County, prioritizing land preservation, smart redevelopment, and ethics reforms. He also received endorsements from Attorney General Brian Frosh and Comptroller Peter Franchot, and outraised his Democratic opponents.

Following Kamenetz's death in May 2018, Brochin said that he would reject any offers to serve out the remainder of Kamenetz's term and encouraged other candidates running for county executive to do the same.

Brochin was defeated in the Democratic primary by Johnny Olszewski by nine votes, prompting him to request a recount that expanded Olszewski's lead to 17 votes. Following his defeat, Brochin endorsed Republican Governor Larry Hogan for re-election.

== Post-senatorial career ==
In November 2024, after Johnny Olszewski was elected to the U.S. House of Representatives, Brochin applied to fill the remainder of Olszewski's term as Baltimore County Executive. His candidacy was supported by Baltimore County State's Attorney Scott Shellenberger. While campaigning for the seat, Brochin told members of the Baltimore County Council that he would cut the budgets of all county agencies, except for public safety and code enforcement, to address the county's incoming budgetary issues, and pledged not to increase county taxes. He also pledged to expand the county's cooperation efforts with U.S. Immigration and Customs Enforcement, promising to seek the deportation of anyone convicted of a felony or serious misdemeanor while staying in the county illegally and citing the murder of Rachel Morin for his positions on immigration. On January 7, 2025, the Baltimore County Council voted to elect state senator Kathy Klausmeier as the next Baltimore County Executive.

== Political positions ==
=== Crime and policing ===
Brochin has described himself as a "law and order legislator". In April 2012, Brochin said that he would support reforms providing violent youth offenders with intensive counseling and therapy to deter juvenile crimes in Maryland, citing their success in Texas and Missouri. During the 2015 legislative session, he introduced legislation to prevent people that commit crimes with firearms from receiving good behavior credits during their sentence. In March 2016, Brochin voted for legislation that would redirect low-level drug offenders into treatment instead of prison, expand record expurgations for certain convictions, and reduce sentences for parole violators.

Brochin supports the death penalty and opposed Governor Martin O'Malley's bill to repeal it, worrying that prosecutors would lose a valuable "bargaining chip" when negotiating plea deals. He also supported unsuccessful efforts to place a ballot initiative on the death penalty repeal on the 2014 general election ballot.

In December 2016, Brochin criticized the state's evidence retention system, which allowed for certain jurisdictions to destroy rape kits after one year while others had to keep kits indefinitely. During the 2018 legislative session, Brochin introduced a bill that make it easier to convict repeat sexual offenders by allowing prosecutors to introduce evidence showing that they had a pattern of behavior. The bill passed and was signed into law by Governor Larry Hogan.

During an interview on WBAL-AM radio in 2021, Brochin suggested that Baltimore County residents should boycott Baltimore until it removed squeegee workers from major intersections. In response, Baltimore Mayor Brandon Scott remarked, "Thank God the citizens of Baltimore County were smart enough to not elect a gaslighting racist like Jim Brochin", which Brochin responded to in a Baltimore Sun op-ed denying that his comments were racist.

=== Development initiatives ===
In August 2011, Brochin suggested implementing a surcharge on eviction notices to help the Baltimore Housing Authority pay nearly $12 million in court-ordered judgments owed to former tenants.

During the 2017 legislative session, Brochin introduced a bill that would prohibit county candidates from accepting campaign contributions with developers who apply for certain development or zoning approvals. During his 2018 county executive campaign, he rallied against proposed developments in Towson, including the Towson Row project and apartments near Lake Roland Park, and said that he opposed the HOME Act, which prohibits landlords from discriminating against potential tenants based on their source of income, saying instead that he would support legislation requiring developers to set aside a certain percentage of housing units for low or moderate income families.

In 2021, Brochin helped pay for attorneys representing opponents of a proposed affordable housing project in east Towson.

=== Education ===
During the 2011 legislative session, Brochin was one of a few Democrats to vote against the Maryland Dream Act, which extended in-state tuition to undocumented immigrants. In May 2011, Brochin said he would sign Republican state delegate Neil Parrott's petition to place a ballot initiative repealing the Maryland Dream Act on the 2012 ballot.

During the 2015 legislative session, Brochin introduced legislation that would prohibit Baltimore County Public Schools from turning magnet schools into neighborhood schools without the permission of the Baltimore County Delegation. In 2016, he introduced a bill to make seat-belts mandatory on school buses. In March 2018, Brochin was the only Democrat in the Maryland Senate to vote against a bill to strip the Maryland Board of Public Works of its oversight and management of the state's annual "beg-a-thon", in which school system leaders appear before the board to request additional school construction funding.

Brochin also voted for a bill to provide low-income students with free tuition to Maryland community colleges.

=== Environment ===
In January 2015, Brochin said he opposed a fracking proposal in western Maryland and introduced a bill to ban fracking in Maryland.

=== Gun control ===
From 2002 to 2012, Brochin accepted nearly $13,000 in campaign contributions from gun lobby organizations, including more than $2,000 from the National Rifle Association of America (NRA). The NRA gave Brochin a "B" rating in 2002, followed by "A" ratings and endorsements for his reelection campaigns in 2006 and 2010, but an "F" rating in 2014. During the 2009 legislative session, Brochin supported a bill that gave judges the authority to seize guns from people with protective orders. In 2013, following the Sandy Hook Elementary School shooting, he voted for the Firearms Safety Act, which banned assault weapons in Maryland. Following the 2017 Las Vegas shooting, Brochin voted for a bill to ban bump stocks in Maryland.

=== Israel ===
During his 2018 county executive campaign, Brochin said he supported Governor Larry Hogan's executive order prohibiting companies that support the Boycott, Divestment and Sanctions movement from contracting with the state government.

=== Marijuana ===
In March 2018, Brochin opposed the legalization of marijuana, but voted for a bill to decriminalize possessing less than an ounce of marijuana.

=== Paid sick leave ===
During the 2017 legislative session, Brochin sought to weaken a paid sick leave bill through amendments reducing the number of sick days employees can receive and allowing the Maryland Department of Labor to provide hardship waivers to businesses that prove that the law would cause them harm.

=== Redistricting ===
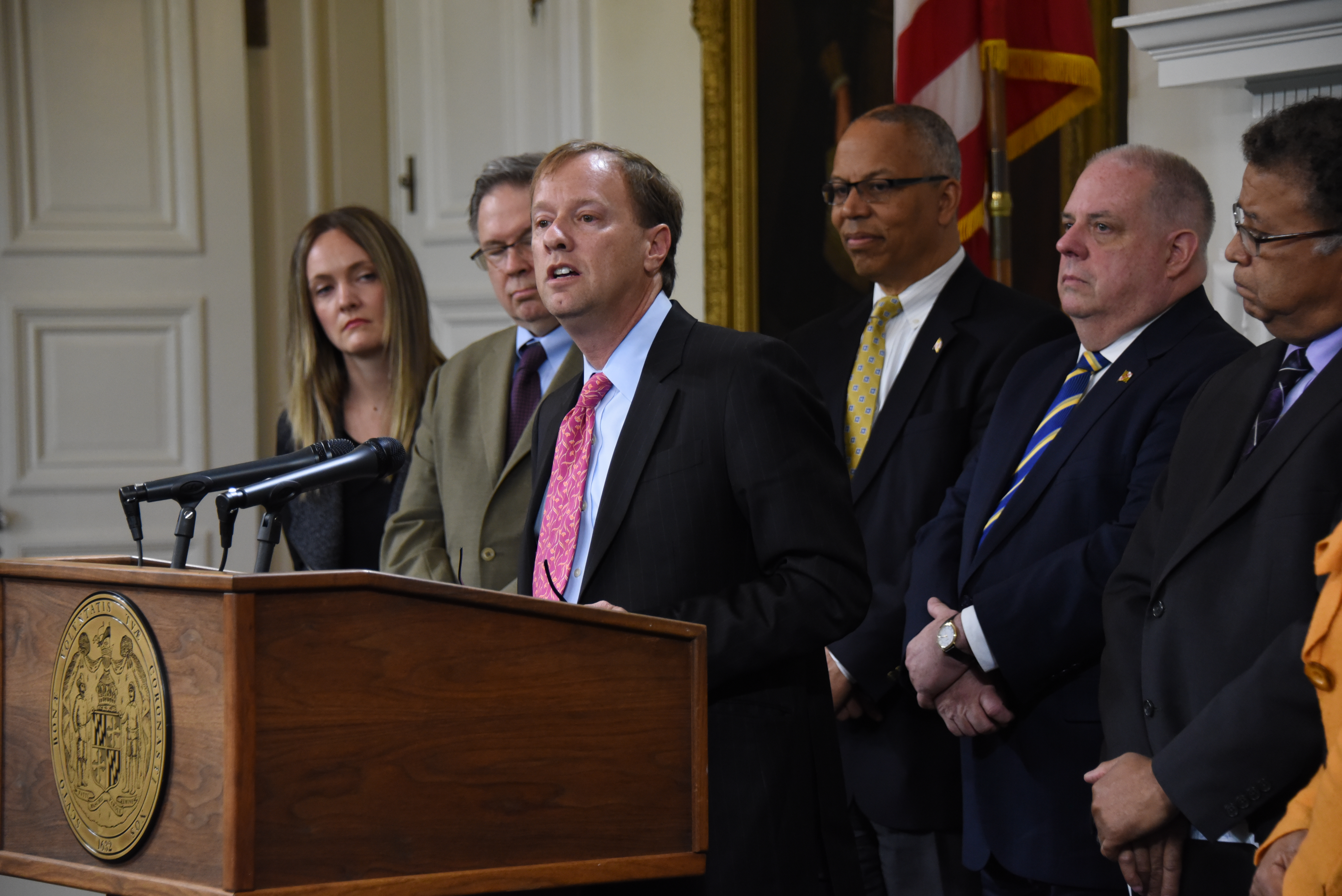
Brochin speaks at Governor Larry Hogan's press conference on a bill requiring Maryland to use an independent redistricting commission if other states agreed to do the same.

In May 2017, Brochin voted against a bill that would require Maryland use an independent redistricting commission to draw its legislative and congressional maps if New York, Pennsylvania, Virginia, and North Carolina all agreed to do the same, and spoke at the press conference where Governor Larry Hogan vetoed this bill. In July 2021, he co-founded Fair Maps Maryland, an anti-gerrymandering lobbying group, alongside former Republican Howard County Executive Allan Kittleman. Brochin criticized legislative leaders for forming their own redistricting commission to draw Maryland's congressional and legislative maps during the 2020 United States redistricting cycle, instead endorsing the redistricting commission appointed by Governor Larry Hogan.

=== Social issues ===
During the 2007 legislative session, Brochin introduced legislation that would abolish the statute of limitations on child sexual abuse lawsuits.

Brochin was a long-time opponent to same-sex marriage in Maryland, insisting on civil unions instead, and initially said that he would vote against the Civil Marriage Protection Act in 2011, but ended up voting for it after hearing same-sex marriage opponents describe members of the gay community as "pedophiles". After the Civil Marriage Protection Act was reintroduced in 2012, he introduced an amendment that would grant same-sex couples the ability to get a civil union instead of a marriage, which was rejected by the Maryland Senate. During the 2014 legislative session, Brochin voted against a bill to ban discrimination against transgender people, citing a hypothetical example of a trans woman waiting in the women's restroom to attack.

In February 2016, Brochin voted against overriding Governor Larry Hogan's veto on a bill that would restore the voting rights of recently released felons.

In March 2018, Brochin voted against a bill that would require presidential candidates to release their tax returns to appear on the ballot in Maryland.

=== Taxes ===
Brochin opposed tax increases proposed by Governor Martin O'Malley. During the 2015 legislative session, he introduced legislation to repeal Maryland's "Rain Tax" and another bill to re-add a checkbox on state income tax return forms that would allow taxpayers to contribute to the Fair Campaign Financing Fund.

=== Transportation ===
During the 2013 legislative session, Brochin introduced a bill that would prohibit the Maryland Transit Administration from audio-taping passenger conversations, which was killed by the Maryland Senate in a 23–22 vote. In January 2014, following the publication of a secret audit that found that Baltimore speed cameras had likely charged motorists for thousands more erroneous tickets than previously disclosed, he introduced a bill that would require ombudsmen to hear complaints about erroneous tickets. The bill passed and was signed into law by Governor Martin O'Malley. In March 2016, Brochin voted against a bill requiring the Maryland Department of Transportation to use a scoring system to determine which transportation projects it would prioritize.

== Personal life ==
Brochin has a daughter. He moved to Towson, Maryland, in 2007, but now lives in Cockeysville, Maryland. He is Jewish.

== Electoral history ==
Maryland Senate District 42 Democratic primary election, 2002
Party	Candidate	Votes	%
Democratic	James Brochin	9,951	100.0

Maryland Senate District 42 election, 2002
Party	Candidate	Votes	%
Democratic	James Brochin	22,709	51.0
Republican	Martha Scanlan Klima	21,781	48.9
Write-in		45	0.1

Maryland Senate District 42 election, 2006
Party	Candidate	Votes	%
Democratic	James Brochin (incumbent)	24,588	56.3
Republican	Douglas B. Riley	19,084	43.7
Write-in		30	0.1
Democratic hold			

Maryland Senate District 42 election, 2010
Party	Candidate	Votes	%
Democratic	James Brochin (incumbent)	24,346	58.4
Republican	Kevin Carney	17,320	41.5
Write-in		27	0.1

Maryland Senate District 42 election, 2014
Party	Candidate	Votes	%
Democratic	James Brochin (incumbent)	23,976	51.6
Republican	Tim Robinson	22,409	48.3
Write-in		48	0.1
Democratic hold			

Baltimore County Executive Democratic primary election, 2018
Party	Candidate	Votes	%
Democratic	Johnny Olszewski	27,820	32.88
Democratic	James Brochin	27,803	32.86
Democratic	Vicki Almond	26,842	31.73
Democratic	Kevin Francis Marron	2,136	2.52
