= James W. Campbell =

American politician

Member of the Maryland House of Delegates from the 42nd district
- In office January 10, 1979 – January 8, 2003
- Succeeded by: Susan Aumann, John G. Trueschler, William J. Frank

Personal details
- Born: March 14, 1947 (age 79) Baltimore, MD
- Party: Democratic

James William Campbell (born March 14, 1947) was a member of the Maryland House of Delegates, District 42.

== Background ==
James W. Campbell was first elected to the Maryland House of Delegates in 1979. He served until 2003. He was defeated in the 2002 general election when District 42 was redrawn. The newly redrawn district elected Republicans Susan Aumann, John G. Trueschler, and William J. Frank.

== Education ==
Campbell attended Severna Park High School in Anne Arundel County, Maryland. After high school he went to the University of Baltimore, where he earned his Bachelor of Arts degree in 1969. He returned to college and finished with his Master of Social Work, M.S.W., from the University of Maryland School of Social Work in 1976.

== Career ==
Delegate Campbell worked as a social worker before being elected. As a member of the Maryland House of Delegates, Campbell served on several committees including: the Constitutional and Administrative Law Committee from 1979 until 1985, the Ways and Means Committee, from 1986 until 2003, and he was chair of the Transportation subcommittee from 1994 until 1996 and chair of the Education subcommittee from 1997 until 2003.

Since 2004, he has been a member of the Baltimore City Board of School Commissioners.

== Election results ==
- 2002 Race for Maryland House of Delegates – District 42

Voters to choose three:

Name	Votes	Percent	Outcome
Susan Aumann, Rep.	21,326	17.2%	Won
William J. Frank, Rep.	20,881	16.9%	Won
John G. Trueschler, Rep.	21,591	17.4%	Won
Stephen W. Lafferty, Dem.	18,958	15.3%	Lost
James W. Campbell, Dem.	18,168	14.7%	Lost
Matthew Joseph, Dem.	17,478	14.1%	Lost
Rick Kunkel, Green	5,464	4.4%	Lost
Other Write-Ins	66	0.1%	Lost

- 1998 Race for Maryland House of Delegates – District 42

Voters to choose three:

Name	Votes	Percent	Outcome
Samuel I. Rosenberg, Dem.	21,768	30%	Won
James W. Campbell, Dem.	20,903	29%	Won
Maggie McIntosh, Dem.	20,443	29%	Won
Jeffrey B. Smith Jr., Rep.	8,399	12%	Lost

- 1994 Race for Maryland House of Delegates – District 42

Voters to choose three:

Name	Votes	Percent	Outcome
Samuel I. Rosenberg, Dem.	22,464	35%	Won
James W. Campbell, Dem.	20,944	33%	Won
Maggie McIntosh, Dem.	20,840	32%	Won

- 1990 Race for Maryland House of Delegates – District 42

Voters to choose three:

Name	Votes	Percent	Outcome
Samuel I. Rosenberg, Dem.	12,633	34%	Won
James W. Campbell, Dem.	12,477	34%	Won
Delores G. Kelley, Dem.	11,949	32%	Won

- 1986 Race for Maryland House of Delegates – District 42

Voters to choose three:

Name	Votes	Percent	Outcome
Samuel I. Rosenberg, Dem.	16,143	30%	Won
James W. Campbell, Dem.	16,000	30%	Won
David B. Shapiro, Dem.	14,978	28%	Won
Nicholas B. Fessenden, Rep.	3,396	6%	Lost
Ernest B. Gray Sr., Rep.	2,750	5%	Lost
