= William J. Frank =

American politician (born 1960)

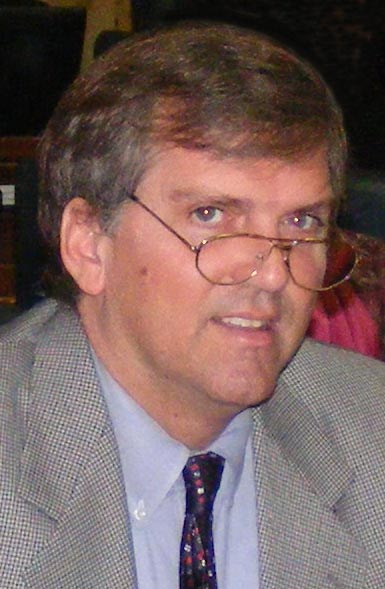

Deputy Secretary of the Maryland Department of Disabilities
- In office May 4, 2015 – December 31, 2018
- Appointed by: Larry Hogan
- Secretary: Carol Beatty
- Preceded by: George P. Failla Jr.
- Succeeded by: Christian Miele

Member of the Maryland House of Delegates from the 42nd district
- In office January 8, 2003 – January 14, 2015
- Preceded by: Maggie McIntosh
- Succeeded by: Chris West

Personal details
- Born: February 4, 1960 (age 66) Baltimore, Maryland, U.S.
- Party: Republican

William J. Frank (born February 4, 1960) is an American politician who served as the deputy secretary of the Maryland Department of Disabilities from 2015 to 2018. A member of the Republican Party, he previously served as a member of the Maryland House of Delegates representing the 42nd district from 2003 to 2015.

== Overview ==
William Frank is a member of the Maryland House of Delegates, representing District 42, which covers a part of Baltimore County. Prior to 2002, District 42 was represented by Democrats James W. Campbell, Maggie L. McIntosh, and Samuel I. Rosenberg. However, after the district lines were redrawn, McIntosh moved to District 43 and Rosenberg moved to District 41, where they both won reelection. On the other hand, Campbell remained in District 42, but was defeated by a host of new Republicans, including Frank, Susan Aumann, and John G. Trueschler.

In 2006, Frank won reelection, along with Susan Aumann. Incumbent Trueschler did not run for reelection. In his stead, Democrat Stephen W. Lafferty won his seat.

== Education ==
Frank attended Archbishop Curley High School in Baltimore. After high school, he went to Mount St. Mary's University in Emmitsburg, MD, graduating cum laude in 1982 with his B.A. in political science. Frank returned to college to get his master's degree. He graduated from the Johns Hopkins University, receiving his M.A.S. (administrative science) in 1992.

== Career ==
Soon after college, Frank began working as vice-president of marketing for the Maryland Credit Union League , working there until 1989. When he left MCUL, he joined Allfirst Bank (which was acquired in a spin-off from Allied Irish Bank by M&T Bank), first as an assistant vice-president of the Public Affairs Division from 1989 until 1996, and then as an assistant vice-president and relationship manager from 1996 until 1999. In 1999, Frank was hired as a development and marketing consultant for the Archdiocese of Baltimore and continues to work there.

Frank has been an active member in his community. He served as a volunteer cook for the Christopher Place Employment Academy from 1988 until 1994. Additionally, he served on the Board of Directors for Action for the Homeless (now Center for Poverty Solutions ) from 1992 until 1996.

Frank is a member of the Fr. O'Neill Council for the Knights of Columbus since 1994. Locally, he served on the board of governors for the Rodgers Forge Community Association , from 1995 until 1997. He was a board member for the Home School Association for the Immaculate Conception School from 1998 until 2000. Frank has served on the President's Council of Mount St. Mary's University since 1998, and the Marketing Advisory Council since 2000. He is on the board of directors of the Independent College Fund of Maryland , and is a member of the Dulaney Valley Improvement Association in Towson, Maryland, and the North Central Republican Club.

As a Republican member of the Maryland House of Delegates, Frank has served as chief deputy minority whip since 2005. He is a member of the Judiciary Committee and the Appropriations Committee, in addition to various subcommittees. Since being elected to the House of Delegates, he has been the deputy minority whip (2003) and the assistant minority whip (2003–05).

=== Legislative notes ===
- voted against in-state tuition for illegal immigrants in 2007 (HB6)
- voted against the Clean Indoor Air Act of 2007 (HB359)

== Election results ==
- 2006 Race for Maryland House of Delegates – District 42

Voters to choose three:

Name	Votes	Percent	Outcome
Susan Aumann, Rep.	22,054	18.3%	Won
Stephen W. Lafferty, Dem.	21,117	17.5%	Won
William J. Frank, Rep.	20,522	17.0%	Won
Dilip Paliath, Rep.	19,490	16.2%	Lost
Tracy Miller, Dem.	19,168	15.9%	Lost
Andrew Belt, Dem.	18,006	14.9%	Lost
Other Write-Ins	88	0.1%	Lost

- 2002 Race for Maryland House of Delegates – District 42

Voters to choose three:

Name	Votes	Percent	Outcome
Susan Aumann, Rep.	21,326	17.2%	Won
William J. Frank, Rep.	20,881	16.9%	Won
John G. Trueschler, Rep.	21,591	17.4%	Won
Stephen W. Lafferty, Dem.	18,958	15.3%	Lost
James W. Campbell, Dem.	18,168	14.7%	Lost
Matthew Joseph, Dem.	17,478	14.1%	Lost
Rick Kunkel, Green	5,464	4.4%	Lost
Other Write-Ins	66	0.1%	Lost
