= John G. Trueschler =

American politician

Member of the Maryland House of Delegates from District 42
- In office January 8, 2003 – January 10, 2007
- Preceded by: Samuel I. Rosenberg
- Succeeded by: Stephen W. Lafferty

Personal details
- Born: September 13, 1957 (age 68) Baltimore, Maryland
- Party: Republican
- Profession: lawyer, politician
- Website: Official website

John G. Trueschler (born September 13, 1957) is an American politician who was a member of the Maryland House of Delegates from District 42.

== Background ==
In the 2002 election, Trueschler won his first election. He won a seat in District 42, which covers portions of Baltimore County. He served in this district along with fellow Republicans Susan L. M. Aumann and William J. Frank. In the general election, they defeated Democratic challengers James W. Campbell, who was an incumbent, Matthew Joseph, and Stephen W. Lafferty. The prior Delegates from District 42 were in different districts after the lines were redrawn. Incumbent Democrat Samuel I. Rosenberg moved to District 41 and Maggie McIntosh moved to District 43.

In 2006, Trueschler decided to retire rather than run for reelection. Democrat Stephen W. Lafferty was elected to replace him, one of several seats that the Republicans lost in the 2006 election in the House of Delegates.

== Education ==
Trueschler was born and raised in the northern Baltimore area. He attended Hampton Elementary School, Towsontown Junior High School, and Loch Raven High School. After high school he went to West Virginia University where he graduated in 1979 with his B.S. in landscape architecture, magna cum laude. Trueschler returned to college to get his J.D. from the University of Maryland School of Law, where he graduated with honors in 1991.

== Career ==
After graduating from West Virginia, Trueschler was a licensed landscape architect. After law school, he was admitted to Maryland Bar in 1991. He is a founding member of the North Central Republican Club and served as vice-president from 1990 until 1991. He is an active member of the Boy Scouts of America and is a committee member of the Dulaney District. Finally, he is on the Soccer Board for the Lutherville-Timonium Recreation Council.

While in the Maryland House of Delegates, Trueschler was a member of the Economic Matters Committee, and several subcommittees including the business regulation subcommittee, the unemployment insurance subcommittee, the alcoholic beverages work group, and the corporations work group.

He was a member of the Medical Malpractice Insurance Work Group, the Maryland Veterans Caucus, and the National Conference of State Legislatures.

== Election results ==
- 2002 Race for Maryland House of Delegates – District 42

Voters to choose three:

Name	Votes	Percent	Outcome
Susan Aumann, Rep.	21,326	17.2%	Won
William J. Frank, Rep.	20,881	16.9%	Won
John G. Trueschler, Rep.	21,591	17.4%	Won
Stephen W. Lafferty, Dem.	18,958	15.3%	Lost
James W. Campbell, Dem.	18,168	14.7%	Lost
Matthew Joseph, Dem.	17,478	14.1%	Lost
Rick Kunkel, Green	5,464	4.4%	Lost
Other Write-Ins	66	0.1%	Lost
