= John P. Donoghue =

American politician (born 1957)

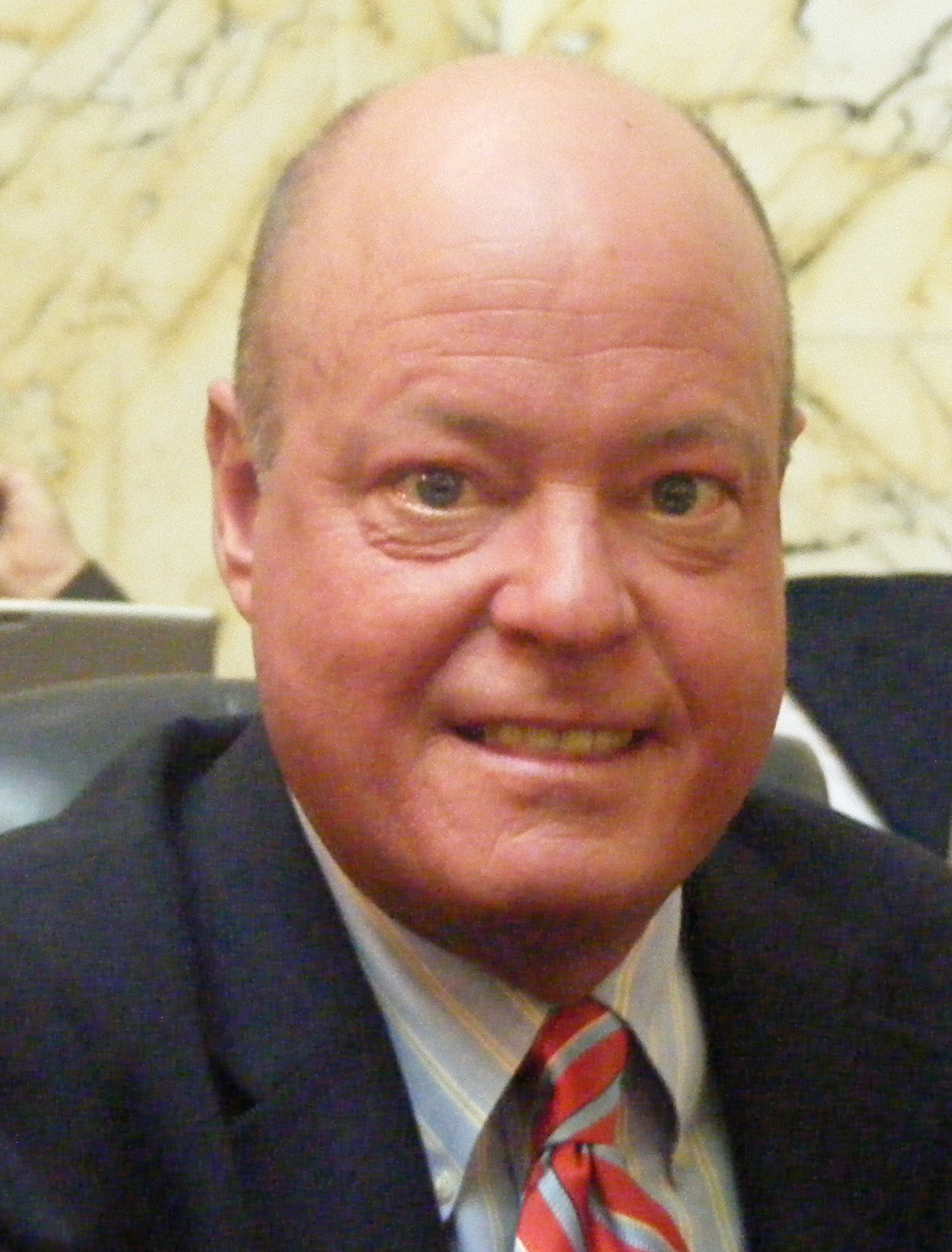

Member of the Maryland House of Delegates from the 2C district
- In office January 1991 – January 14, 2015
- Preceded by: Donald F. Munson

Personal details
- Born: May 24, 1957 (age 69) New York City, U.S.
- Party: Democratic
- Occupation: Financial advisor

John P. Donoghue (born May 24, 1957) is an American politician from Maryland and a member of the Democratic Party. He served 6 terms in the Maryland House of Delegates, representing Maryland's District 2C in Washington County. Donoghue is a member of the Health and Government Operations Committee.

== Background ==
Donoghue was born in New York City on May 24, 1957. In addition to being a Financial Advisor with Baltimore-based investment firm Legg Mason, Delegate Donoghue has been active in several organizations. He is a past president of the Washington County Unit of the American Cancer Society and a member of the Knights of Columbus, (4th degree). Additionally, he was a member of the City Council of Hagerstown from 1989 until 1990. He has been a member of the Tri-County Council for Western Maryland since 1991, a member of the Citizens Advisory Board for Western Maryland Center since 1992, and co-chair of the Task Force to Review Physician Shortages in Rural Areas since 2008.

Former memberships include the Maryland Civil War Heritage Commission on which he served from 1992 until 1996, the Task Force to Study Patient and Provider Appeal and Grievance Mechanisms in 1996, and finally the Task Force on Broadband Communications Deployment in Underserved Rural Areas from 2003 until 2006.

In politics, in addition to being a member of the Maryland House of Delegates, Donoghue was also a delegate of the 2008 Democratic National Convention that nominated Barack Obama for president.

== Education ==
Delegate Donoghue attended St. Maria Goretti High School in Hagerstown, Maryland. He graduated from Catholic University in 1981 with a degree in Political Science before becoming a financial advisor with Legg Mason.

== Political career ==
Since first being elected to office in 1991, Donoghue has been active on many committees and in various positions. His most significant role to date was that of Chief Deputy Majority Whip, which he has held since 2003. His current committee memberships include the Health and Government Operations Committee (since 2003; including the Insurance Subcommittee since 2004), the Health Insurance and Long-term Care Subcommittees (both from 2003 until 2004), the Pharmaceuticals Subcommittee (in 2005), and the Government Operations Subcommittee (since 2007).

He has also served as chair of the Health Facilities, Equipment & Products Subcommittee, on which he served from 2003 until 2005, and has been the chair of the Health Facilities & Occupations Subcommittee since 2005. He was a member of the Economic Matters Committee from 1991 until 2003, including the Workers' Compensation Subcommittee in 1994, and chair of the Health Insurance Subcommittee from 1995 until 2003.

Additionally, he was a member of the Joint Committee on Federal Relations from 1993 until 2002, Deputy Majority Whip from 1995 until 1999, a member of the Special Joint Committee on Competitive Taxation and Economic Development from 1996 until 1997, the Speaker's Advisory Committee on Legislative Redistricting from 2001 until 2002, the Joint Committee on the State's Emergency Medical Response System from 2003 until 2005, and the Joint Committee on the Selection of the State Treasurer in 2007. Finally, he was the chair of the Washington County Delegation from 1995 until 1998, has been the vice-chair of the Western Maryland Delegation since 1995, has been a member of the Maryland Legislative Sportsmen's Caucus since 2001, the Maryland Rural Caucus since 2002, the Maryland Veterans Caucus since 2005, and a member of the National Conference of State Legislatures since 2005.

== Election results ==
- 2006 Race for Maryland House of Delegates – District 2C

Voters to choose one:

Name	Votes	Percent	Outcome
John P. Donoghue, Dem.	5,099	55.5%	Won
Paul Muldowney, Rep.	4,078	44.4%	Lost
Other Write-Ins	4	0.0%	Lost

- 2002 Race for Maryland House of Delegates – District 2C

Voters to choose one:

Name	Votes	Percent	Outcome
John P. Donoghue, Dem.	5,185	58.8%	Won
Robert E. Bruchey, II, Rep.	3,611	41.0%	Lost
Other Write-Ins	16	0.2%	Lost

- 1998 Race for Maryland House of Delegates – District 2C

Voters to choose one:

Name	Votes	Percent	Outcome
John P. Donoghue, Dem.	4,996	84%	Won
Paul Muldowney, Dem. Write-In	956	16%	Lost

- 1994 Race for Maryland House of Delegates – District 2C

Voters to choose one:

Name	Votes	Percent	Outcome
John P. Donoghue, Dem.	4,013	57%	Won
Bertrand Iseminger, Rep.	3,027	43%	Lost
Eugene E. Morris, Dem.	9	0%	Lost

- 1990 Race for Maryland House of Delegates – District 2C

Voters to choose one:

Name	Votes	Percent	Outcome
John P. Donoghue, Dem.	2,746	50%	Won
Bertrand Iseminger, Rep.	2,712	50%	Lost

=== Legislative notes ===
- voted against the Clean Indoor Air Act of 2007 (HB359) citing a previous law requiring restaurants to meet statewide standards to eliminate smoke with adequate ventilation and providing separate areas for smoking and non-smoking patrons
- voted in favor of increasing the sales tax whilst simultaneously reducing income tax rates for some income brackets - Tax Reform Act of 2007(HB2)
- voted for the Maryland Gang Prosecution Act of 2007 (HB713), subjecting gang members to up to 20 years in prison and/or a fine of up to $100,000
- voted for Jessica's Law (HB 930), eliminating parole for the most violent child sexual predators and creating a mandatory minimum sentence of 25 years in state prison, 2007
- voted for Public Safety – Statewide DNA Database System – Crimes of Violence and Burglary – Post conviction (HB 370), helping to give police officers and prosecutors greater resources to solve crimes and eliminating a backlog of 24,000 unanalyzed DNA samples, leading to 192 arrests, 2008
- voted for Vehicle Laws – Repeated Drunk and Drugged Driving Offenses – Suspension of License (HB 293), strengthening Maryland's drunk driving laws by imposing a mandatory one year license suspension for a person convicted of drunk driving more than once in five years, 2009
- voted for HB 102, creating the House Emergency Medical Services System Workgroup, leading to Maryland's budgeting of $52 million to fund three new Medevac helicopters to replace the State's aging fleet, 2009

For the past four years, Delegate Donoghue has annually voted to support classroom teachers, public schools, police and hospitals in Washington County. Since 2002, funding to schools across the State has increased 82%, resulting in Maryland being ranked top in the nation for K-12 education.
