= Darryl Kelley =

The Reverend Darryl A. Kelley
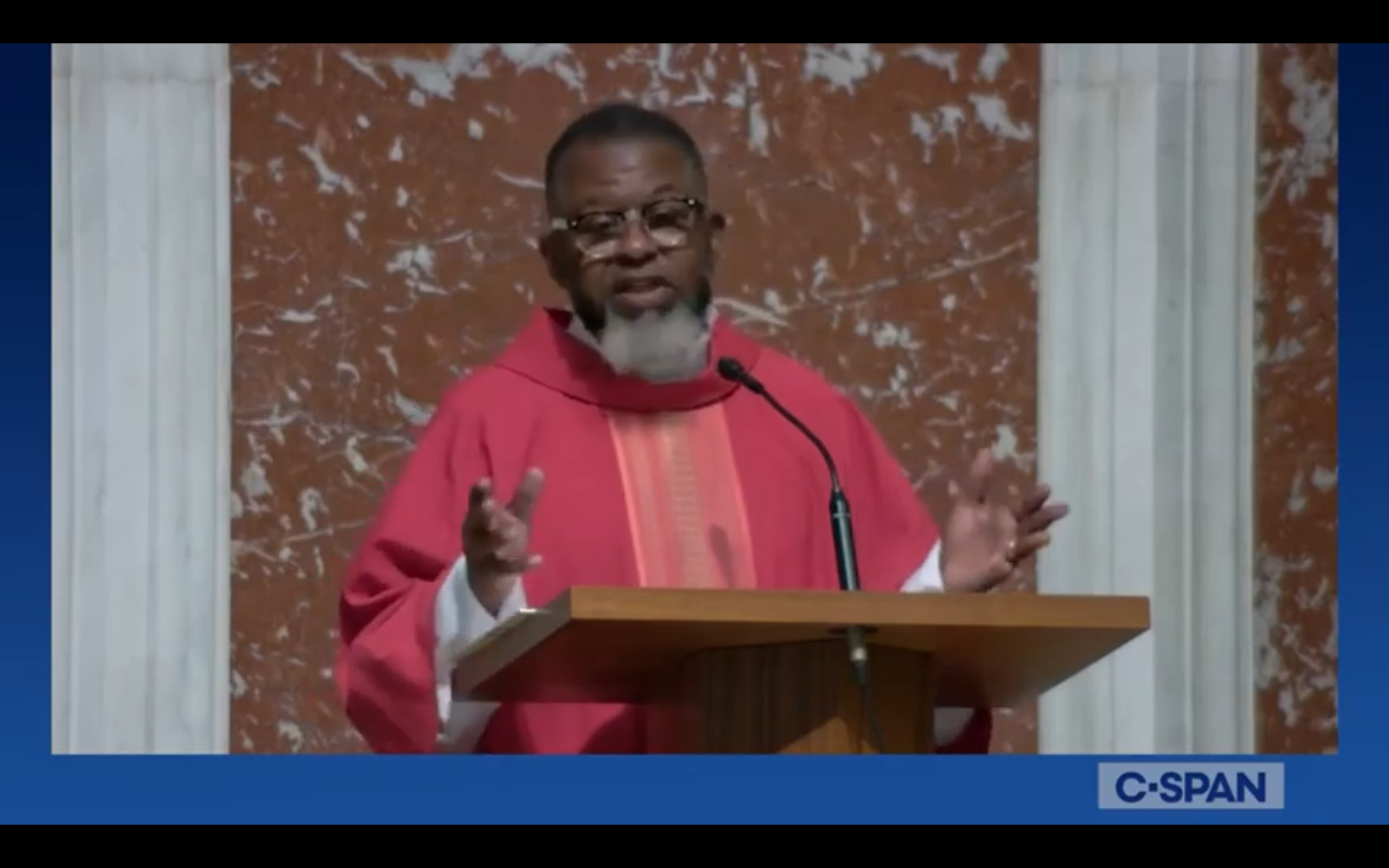
- Kelley preaching the 72nd Annual Red Mass for the Archdiocese of Washington in October 2024.

Maryland State Delegate

Member of the Maryland House of Representatives from the 26th Legislative district
- In office January 8, 2003 – January 10, 2007

Personal details
- Born: January 19, 1961 (age 65) Norfolk, Virginia
- Party: Democratic Party
- Education: University of Virginia (BA); University of Maryland School of Law (JD)

Darryl A. Kelley is an American Catholic permanent deacon and former Maryland State Delegate who represented part of Legislative District 26 with the Democratic Party from 2003 to 2007.

== Early life and education ==
Kelley was born on January 19, 1961, in Norfolk, Virginia, where he attended Norfolk and Virginia Beach public schools. He matriculated to the University of Virginia, where he received a degree in history in 1983. He was later a member of the Air Force Reserves from 1983 to 1984. He attended the University of Maryland Francis King Carey School of Law, where he earned a Juris Doctor degree in 1997. He served as a clerk for the Federal Bureau of Investigation from 1984 to 1986 and was admitted to the Maryland Bar and District of Columbia Bar in 1998.

== Legal career ==
Kelley served as a federal agent of the United States Marshals Service from 1986 to 1999. He was a clerk for the U.S. Marshals' Office of General Council from 1994 to 1996. Additionally, he interned for Judge Reggie Walton from 1996 to 1997. He began a private law firm, Kelley Legal Services, LLC, in 1999. He was a legislative assistant to U.S. senator Paul Sarbanes from 1999 to 2001.

Kelley was a member of the American Bar Association and National Bar Association, the Maryland State Bar Association.

== Political career ==
Kelley was elected to the Maryland House of Delegates as a Democrat in November 2002, taking his seat in January of the next year. He was a member of the Judiciary Committee from 2003 to 2007 and the Special Committee on Drug and Alcohol Abuse. He was chair to the Bi-County Committee, Prince George's County Delegation from 2006 to 2007, previously serving as vice chair from 2003 to 2005. He was a member of the Legislative Black Caucus of Maryland.

== Religious ministry ==
Kelley was ordained a permanent deacon in the Catholic Church in 2019. He preached the Red Mass for the Archdiocese of Washington in October 2024.

== Personal life ==
Kelley married his wife Evelyn in 1986 and they have three children. His sister-in-law is former Maryland State Delegate Delores G. Kelley.

Formerly a Baptist, Kelley converted to Catholicism as an adult.
