= Maggie McIntosh =

American politician (born 1947)

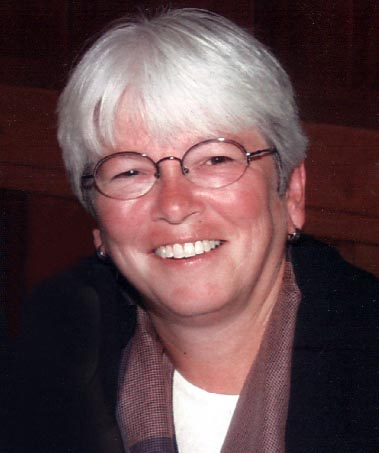

Member of the Maryland House of Delegates
- In office November 10, 1992 – January 11, 2023
- Preceded by: Delores G. Kelley (42nd); Anne Perkins (43rd)
- Succeeded by: Susan L. M. Aumann (42nd); Elizabeth Embry (43rd)
- Constituency: 42nd district (1992–2003); 43rd district (2003–2023)

Personal details
- Born: December 22, 1947 (age 78) Quinter, Kansas, U.S.
- Party: Democratic
- Spouse: Diane Stollenwerk
- Education: Neodesha High School Independence Community College; Wichita State University (BA); Johns Hopkins University (MS)
- Website: Official website

Margaret L. "Maggie" McIntosh (born December 22, 1947) is an American politician from the state of Maryland. She was a member of the Maryland House of Delegates from 1993 to 2023. She is a former Baltimore City Public School teacher who chaired the House Environmental Matters Committee from 2003 to 2015 and the House Appropriations Committee from 2015 to 2022. A Democrat, she represented the state's 43rd district in Baltimore City. Following her retirement from the Maryland House of Delegates in 2023, McIntosh has worked as a senior consultant at the Cornerstone Government Affairs lobbying group.

== Early life and career ==
McIntosh received her Bachelor's Degree in arts education from Wichita State University in 1970 and her Master of Science degree from the Johns Hopkins University in 1987. An educator, she taught art in the Baltimore City Public Schools from 1972–78, before becoming an adjunct instructor of continuing education at Catonsville Community College (now known as the Catonsville campus of the Community College of Baltimore County).

She would later spend nine years working for the City of Baltimore at the Commission on Aging and Retirement Education, serving from 1985 to 1988 as the Director of Pre-Retirement Education. During that time, she was heavily involved in Democratic campaigns, including those of Michael Dukakis and Barbara Mikulski. She was elected as a delegate to both the 1980 and 2008 Democratic National Conventions, the latter as a delegate pledged to Hillary Clinton.

== Legislative career ==
Maggie McIntosh was appointed to fill a vacancy in the House of Delegates in November 1992, when Delegate Anne Perkins accepted a teaching position in China. Two years later she was elected to a full term representing the 42nd District of Baltimore City and parts of Baltimore County. She has been re-elected in 1998, 2002, 2006 and 2010, but had to run in a substantially different district after the post-2000 round of redistricting; the 43rd, which she now represents, contains only 10% of the voters from her previous district, the 42nd. Nevertheless, in 2002, she placed first in a Democratic primary election in her new district which included five serving or former delegates vying for three seats. Since then, she has been re-elected each term, most recently in the 2018 election to serve another four years.

=== In the Legislature ===
In the House of Delegates, McIntosh first served on the Appropriations Committee. She chaired the Subcommittee on Personnel and was a member of the Education and Economic Development and Capitol Subcommittees. In 1998, McIntosh assumed the position of Vice Chairman of the Commerce and Government Matters Committee. In 2001, she was named House Majority Leader after a previous stint as Deputy Majority Whip (1995–98), and became the first woman in Maryland history to serve as majority leader. In January 2003, McIntosh was named chairman of the House Environmental Matters Committee, which handles legislation regarding not just the environment, natural resources, and agriculture, but also transportation, housing, and local government. In January 2015, McIntosh was appointed to chair the House Appropriations Committee, the first woman in the history of Maryland to do so, overseeing the state operating and capital budgets, supplementary appropriations bills, state and county bond authorizations, higher education institutions, state and local agency procedures and programs, collective bargaining, social services, and state personnel and pension matters.

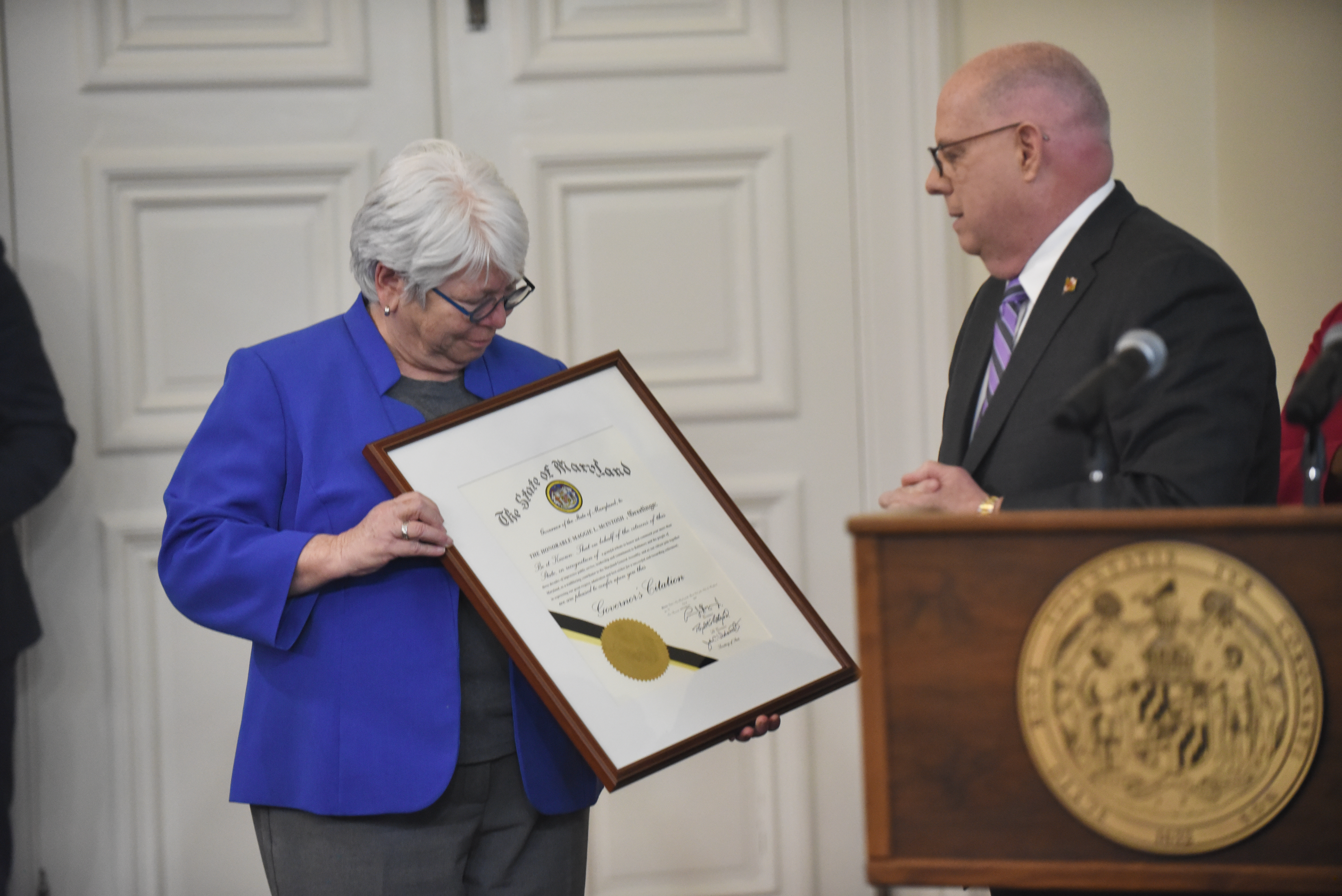
Governor Larry Hogan presenting McIntosh with a governor's citation, 2022

In November 2021, McIntosh announced that she would retire from the House of Delegates at the end of her term in 2022. On April 1, 2022, Governor Larry Hogan issued a Governor's Citation to McIntosh, and signed a bill into law creating the Maggie McIntosh School Arts Fund, which invests $250,000 a year into arts projects in Baltimore City public schools.

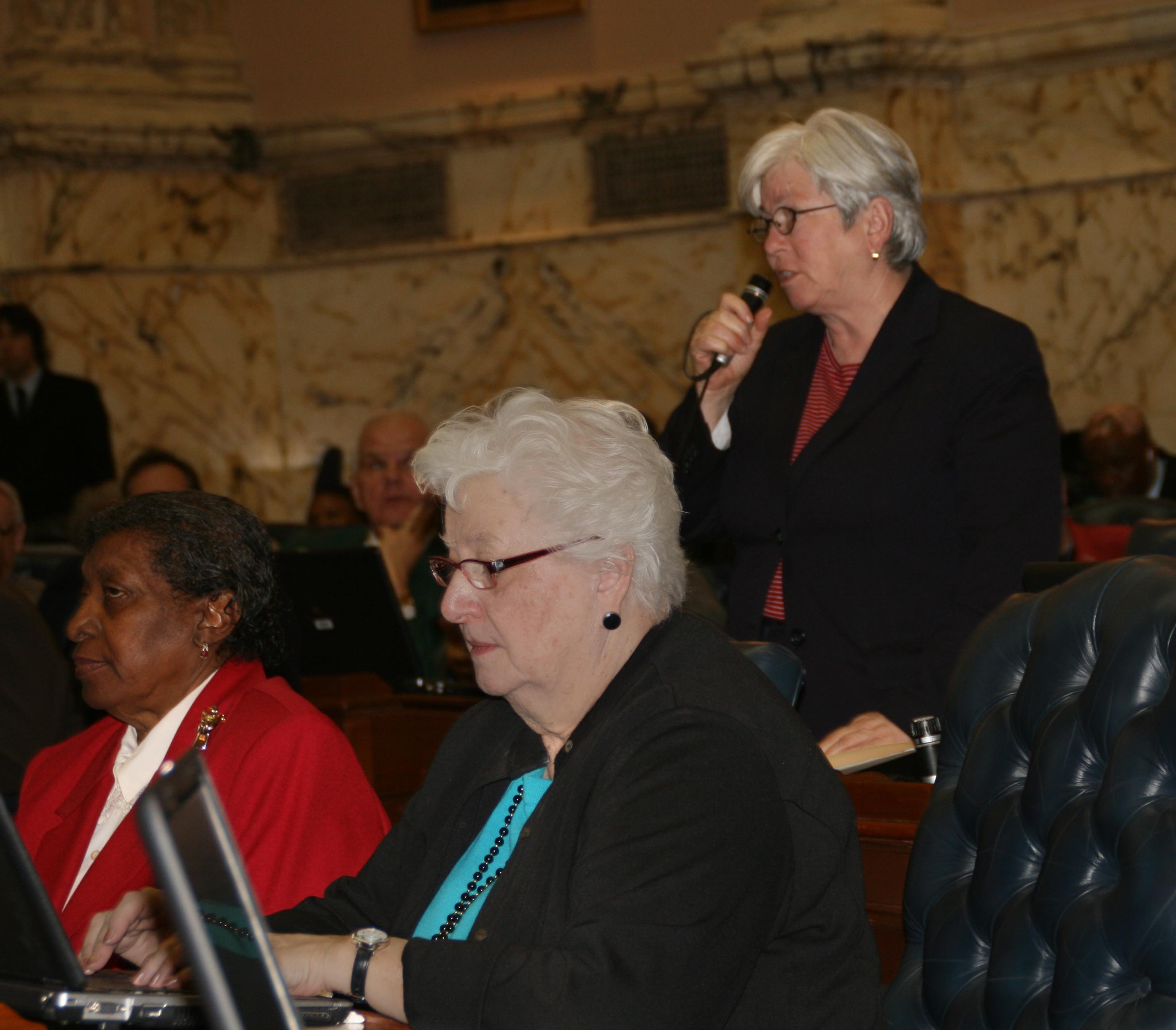
McIntosh during floor debate in 2009

=== Legislative Notes and Accomplishments ===
- Inducted into Maryland Women’s Hall of Fame in 2025.
- Voted 2nd (after Speaker Michael E. Busch) in The Maryland Gazette of Politics and Business's list of most influential Maryland state delegates for 2010
- Inducted into Daily Record (Maryland)'s Circle of Excellence after being named to Top 100 Women in Maryland list in 1998, 2000, and 2010
- Elected Vice-Chair of The Chesapeake Bay Commission (2012–present)
- Sponsor of 2012 Bottle Deposit bill
- Co-Sponsor of Death Penalty Repeal legislation
- Co-sponsor of Marriage Equality legislation
- Lead Sponsor, Chesapeake Conservation Corp Program
- Lead Sponsor, Ground Rent Registration and Reform
- Co-sponsored HB 860 (Baltimore City Public Schools Construction and Revitalization Act of 2013). Signed by the Governor on May 16, 2013, the new law approved 1.1 billion dollars to construct new schools in Baltimore City.

== Past general election results ==
- 2014 Race for Maryland House of Delegates – 43rd District

Voters to choose three:

Name	Votes	Percent	Outcome
Curt Anderson, Democratic	23,046	34.1%	Won
Maggie McIntosh, Democratic	22,310	33%	Won
Mary L. Washington, Democratic	21,800	32.3%	Won
Other Write-Ins	267	.4%	Lost
Greg Dorsey (Write-In)	128	.2%	Lost

- 2010 Race for Maryland House of Delegates – 43rd District

Voters to choose three:

Name	Votes	Percent	Outcome
Curt Anderson, Democratic	24,831	35.1%	Won
Maggie McIntosh, Democratic	23,266	32.9%	Won
Mary L. Washington, Democratic	22,334	31.6%	Won
Other Write-Ins	312	.44%	Lost

- 2006 Race for Maryland House of Delegates – 43rd District

Voters to choose three:

Name	Votes	Percent	Outcome
Curt Anderson, Democratic	22,315	29.4%	Won
Maggie McIntosh, Democratic	22,093	29.1%	Won
Ann Marie Doory, Democratic	21,219	28.0%	Won
Armand F. Girard, Republican	3,425	4.5%	Lost
David G.S. Greene, Green	2,619	3.5%	Lost
Brandy Baker, Green	2,267	3.0%	Lost
Richard J. Ochs, Green	1,772	2.3%	Lost

- 2002 Race for Maryland House of Delegates – 43rd District

Voters to choose three:

Name	Votes	Percent	Outcome
Maggie McIntosh, Democratic	21,993	32.5%	Won
Curt Anderson, Democratic	21,131	30.8%	Won
Ann Marie Doory, Democratic	19,999	29.15%	Won
John A. Heath, Republican	5,243	7.64%	Lost
Morning Sunday, Green(Write-In)	152	.22%	Lost
Other Write-Ins	97	.14%	Lost

- 1998 Race for Maryland House of Delegates – District 42

Voters to choose three:

Name	Votes	Percent	Outcome
Samuel I. Rosenberg, Dem.	21,768	30%	Won
James W. Campbell, Dem.	20,903	29%	Won
Maggie McIntosh, Dem.	20,443	29%	Won
Jeffrey B. Smith Jr., Rep.	8,399	12%	Lost

== Firsts ==
Delegate McIntosh is the first woman to chair the powerful Appropriations Committee in Maryland's House of Delegates, after being the first woman to be appointed majority leader in the House of Delegates and the first openly gay elected member of the Maryland General Assembly in March 2003. McIntosh is also the first woman to serve as the chairman of the Environmental Matters Committee where she has steered several major legislative initiatives to passage. The Chesapeake Bay Restoration Act, which funded upgrades at wastewater treatment plants around the state, is among McIntosh's accomplishments, as well as an annexation measure passed in 2006 in which she brought counties and municipalities together.
