= Stephen W. Lafferty =

American politician

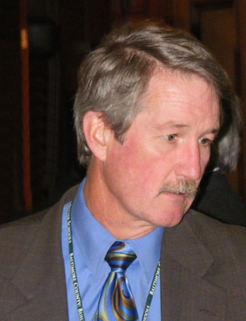

Member of the Maryland House of Delegates from the 42A district
- In office January 2015 – September 6, 2019
- Preceded by: Position established
- Succeeded by: Cathi Forbes

Member of the Maryland House of Delegates from the 42nd district
- In office January 2007 – January 2015
- Preceded by: John G. Trueschler
- Succeeded by: Position abolished

Personal details
- Born: February 28, 1949 (age 77) Washington, D.C., United States
- Party: Democratic
- Spouse: Betsy Lafferty
- Occupation: Attorney

Stephen W. Lafferty (born February 28, 1949) is an American politician who was a member of Maryland House of Delegates from January 2007 to September 2019, representing District 42 from 2007 to 2015, and District 42A from 2015 to 2019. Lafferty was the first Democrat to be elected in district 42 since it was moved to Baltimore County after the 21st century census and redistricting. In September 2019, he resigned from the House of Delegates to serve as chief sustainability officer for Baltimore County Executive Johnny Olszewski.

== Background ==
Lafferty was born in Washington, D.C., on February 28, 1949. He attended the University of Maryland, College Park where he earned his B.A. in American studies in 1971. Just a year later at Bowling Green State University, he earned a M.A. also in American studies; and then a teacher's certificate at Towson State University in 1977. He was a teacher (mathematics & social studies) for Baltimore City Public Schools from 1974–1978. Lafferty served as executive director & assistant director for the Baltimore American Indian Center, Inc. during 1978–1980. He received a J.D. from the University of Baltimore School of Law in 1983. He was admitted to the Maryland Bar in 1983.

He is married to Betsy Lafferty. Lafferty resides in Stoneleigh.

== In the legislature ==
Lafferty was a member of House of Delegates from January 10, 2007, to September 6, 2019. He served on the House Environmental Matters Committee and its housing & real property, its land use & ethics and its local government & bi-county subcommittees. He also contributed to the ground rent legislation of 2007 through the ground rent work group.

=== Legislative notes ===
- voted for the Clean Indoor Air Act of 2007 (HB359)
- voted in favor of prohibiting ground rents in 2007(SB106)
- voted for the Maryland Gang Prosecution Act of 2007 (HB713), subjecting gang members to up to 20 years in prison and/or a fine of up to $100,000
- voted for Jessica's Law (HB 930), eliminating parole for the most violent child sexual predators and creating a mandatory minimum sentence of 25 years in state prison, 2007
- voted for Public Safety – Statewide DNA Database System – Crimes of Violence and Burglary – Post conviction (HB 370), helping to give police officers and prosecutors greater resources to solve crimes and eliminating a backlog of 24,000 unanalyzed DNA samples, leading to 192 arrests, 2008
- voted for Vehicle Laws – Repeated Drunk and Drugged Driving Offenses – Suspension of License (HB 293), strengthening Maryland's drunk driving laws by imposing a mandatory one year license suspension for a person convicted of drunk driving more than once in five years, 2009
- voted for HB 102, creating the House Emergency Medical Services System Workgroup, leading to Maryland's budgeting of $52 million to fund three new Medevac helicopters to replace the State's aging fleet, 2009
- co-sponsored and voted for HB0294 (cross filed with SB281) that restricted gun possession, 2012

== Post-legislative career ==
In 2019, Lafferty became Baltimore county's first chief sustainability officer.

== Election results ==
- 2006 Race for Maryland House of Delegates – District 42

Voters to choose three:

Name	Votes	Percent	Outcome
Susan Aumann, Rep.	22,054	18.3%	Won
Stephen W. Lafferty, Dem.	21,117	17.5%	Won
William J. Frank, Rep.	20,522	17.0%	Won
Dilip Paliath, Rep.	19,490	16.2%	Lost
Tracy Miller, Dem.	19,168	15.9%	Lost
Andrew Belt, Dem.	18,006	14.9%	Lost
Other Write-Ins	88	0.1%	Lost

- 2002 Race for Maryland House of Delegates – District 42

Voters to choose three:

Name	Votes	Percent	Outcome
Susan Aumann, Rep.	21,326	17.2%	Won
William J. Frank, Rep.	20,881	16.9%	Won
John G. Trueschler, Rep.	21,591	17.4%	Won
Stephen W. Lafferty, Dem.	18,958	15.3%	Lost
James W. Campbell, Dem.	18,168	14.7%	Lost
Matthew Joseph, Dem.	17,478	14.1%	Lost
Rick Kunkel, Green	5,464	4.4%	Lost
Other Write-Ins	66	0.1%	Lost
