= Susan L. M. Aumann =

American politician (born 1960)

Susan L.M. Aumann
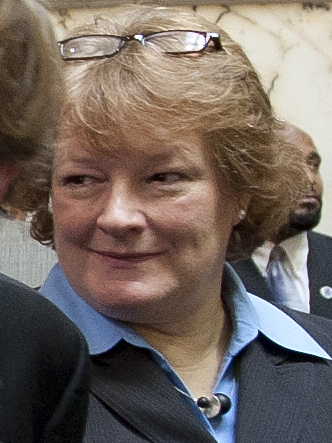

Member of the Maryland House of Delegates from District 42B
- In office January 14, 2015 – January 9, 2019
- Preceded by: Constituency Established
- Succeeded by: Michele Guyton

Member of the Maryland House of Delegates from District 42
- In office January 8, 2003 – January 14, 2015
- Preceded by: James W. Campbell
- Succeeded by: Constituency Abolished

Personal details
- Born: July 1, 1960 (age 66) Baltimore
- Party: Republican
- Website: http://www.susanaumann.com

Susan L. M. Aumann (born July 1, 1960) is a member of the Maryland House of Delegates, District 42.

== Background ==
Susan Aumann is a former member of the Maryland House of Delegates, represent District 42, which is a portion of Baltimore County in Maryland. She served this district along with fellow Republican William J. Frank and Democrat Stephen W. Lafferty.

Prior to 2002, District 42 was represented by Democrats James W. Campbell, Maggie McIntosh, and Samuel I. Rosenberg. However, after the district lines were redrawn, McIntosh moved to District 43 and Rosenberg moved to District 41, where they both won reelection. On the other hand, Campbell remained in District 42, but was defeated by a host of new Republicans, including Aumann, William J. Frank, and John G. Trueschler. In 2006, Aumann won reelection, along with William J. Frank. Incumbent Trueschler did not run for reelection. In his stead, Democrat Stephen W. Lafferty won his seat.

== Education ==
Aumann attended Notre Dame Preparatory School, an all-girls preparatory school in Towson. After high school, she attended the College of Notre Dame of Maryland, receiving her B.A. in business administration & management in 1983. Continuing her education, she attended the University of Baltimore.

== Career ==
Much of Aumann's career has been focused on accounting. She was a sales associate at Valley Motors, a car dealership in Cockeysville from 1983 until 1985, when she became a loan counselor with First Financial Federal Credit Union, in nearby Lutherville, where she worked for a year. Soon thereafter, she worked as a private banking account executive for the Bank of Baltimore, working there from 1987 until 1988. In 1988, she took a position as a staff accountant for Ira J. Sugar & Associates, where she worked until 1989. In 1989, Aumann began working for MNC Financial, which was bought by NationsBank, where she stayed for several years. She later worked for Congressman Bob Ehrlich, first as a Financial Operations Officer and Treasurer, then as Finance Operations Officer and Treasurer for his "Bob Ehrlich for Maryland Committee" where she stayed until 2002.

Aumann was a member of the Baltimore County Republican Central Committee from 1994 until 1998 and the North Central Republican Club from 1990 until 1999. Other groups where she is a member include the Loch Raven Watershed Coalition, Shepherd's Knoll Condominium Association, the Historic Hampton, Inc. in Towson, Maryland and the Women's Committee of Hampton.

As a member of the Maryland House of Delegates, she was a member of the Appropriations Committee, the Joint Audit Committee, the Joint Committee on the Management of Public Funds, the Special Joint Committee on Pensions, and the Joint Committee on Legislative Ethics. From 2007, she was a Deputy Minority Whip.

== Family ==
She is married to R. Karl Aumann, former Secretary of State for Maryland under Gov. Ehrlich. The couple has two children.

== Legislative notes ==
- voted for slots in 2005 (HB1361)
- voted for Healthy Air Act in 2006 (SB154)
- voted for the Clean Indoor Air Act of 2007 (HB359)
- voted against in-state tuition for illegal immigrants (HB6)

== Election results ==
- 2006 Race for Maryland House of Delegates – District 42

Voters to choose three:

Name	Votes	Percent	Outcome
Susan Aumann, Rep.	22,054	18.3%	Won
Stephen W. Lafferty, Dem.	21,117	17.5%	Won
William J. Frank, Rep.	20,522	17.0%	Won
Dilip Paliath, Rep.	19,490	16.2%	Lost
Tracy Miller, Dem.	19,168	15.9%	Lost
Andrew Belt, Dem.	18,006	14.9%	Lost
Other Write-Ins	88	0.1%	Lost

- 2002 Race for Maryland House of Delegates – District 42

Voters to choose three:

Name	Votes	Percent	Outcome
Susan Aumann, Rep.	21,326	17.2%	Won
William J. Frank, Rep.	20,881	16.9%	Won
John G. Trueschler, Rep.	21,591	17.4%	Won
Stephen W. Lafferty, Dem.	18,958	15.3%	Lost
James W. Campbell, Dem.	18,168	14.7%	Lost
Matthew Joseph, Dem.	17,478	14.1%	Lost
Rick Kunkel, Green	5,464	4.4%	Lost
Other Write-Ins	66	0.1%	Lost
