= Maryland Legislative District 42 =

American legislative district

Maryland's legislative district 42
- Represents part of Baltimore County
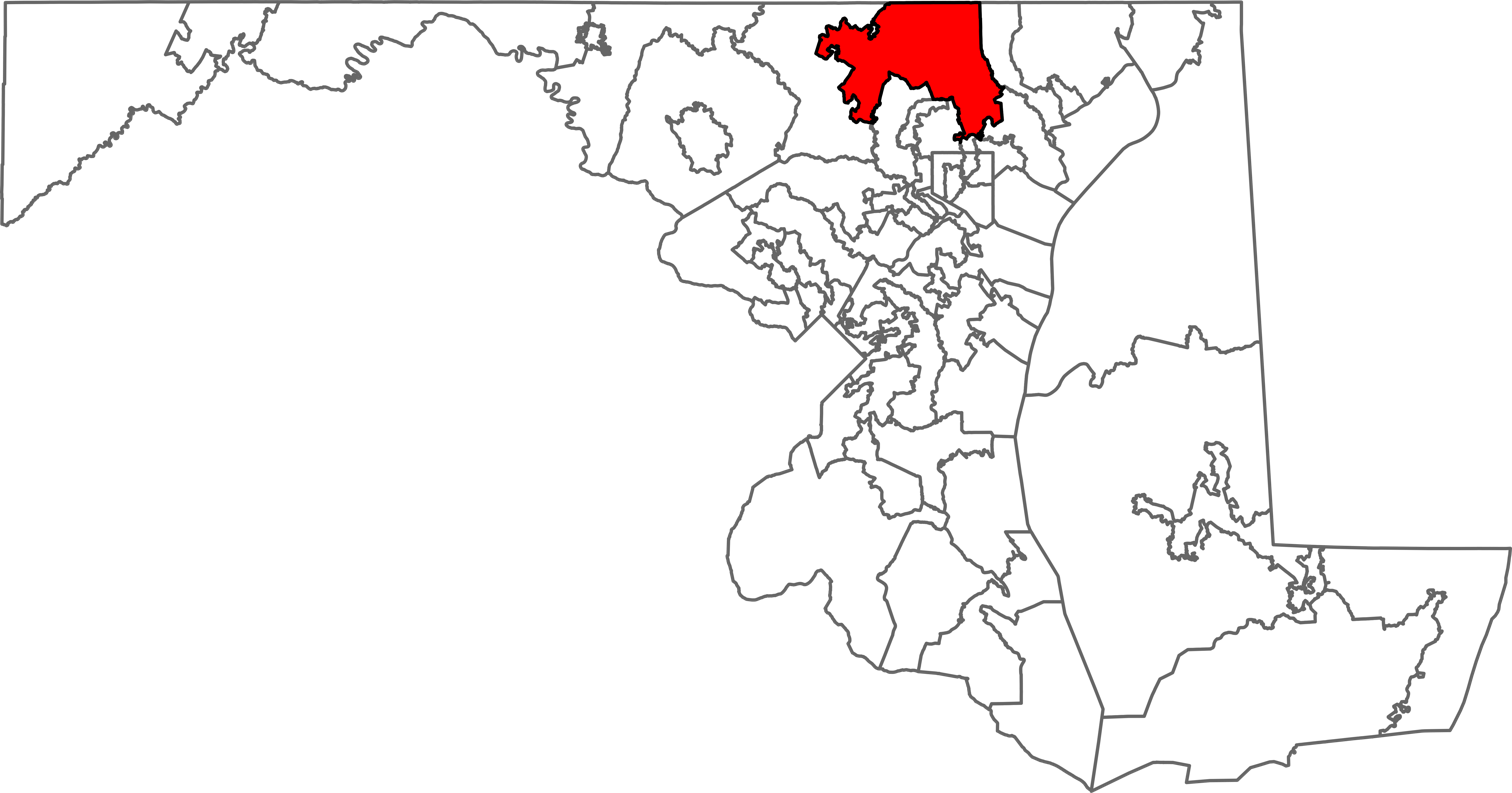
- Senator: Christopher R. West (R)
- Delegate(s): Alexander M. Harlan (R) (District 42A); Michele J. Guyton (D) (District 42B); Joshua Stonko (R) (District 42C)
- Registration: 46.9% Democratic; 32.8% Republican; 18.5% unaffiliated
- Demographics: 73.2% White; 12.2% Black/African American; 0.2% Native American; 6.5% Asian; 0.0% Hawaiian/Pacific Islander; 1.7% Other race; 6.1% Two or more races; 4.8% Hispanic
- Population (2020): 130,396
- Voting-age population: 105,099
- Registered voters: 89,904

Maryland Legislative District 42 is one of 47 districts in the state for the Maryland General Assembly. It covers part of Baltimore County. The district is divided into three sub-districts for the Maryland House of Delegates: District 42A, District 42B, and District 42C.

== Demographic characteristics ==
As of the 2020 United States census, the district had a population of 130,396, of whom 105,099 (80.6%) were of voting age. The racial makeup of the district was 95,427 (73.2%) White, 15,877 (12.2%) African American, 317 (0.2%) Native American, 8,497 (6.5%) Asian, 21 (0.0%) Pacific Islander, 2,244 (1.7%) from some other race, and 7,991 (6.1%) from two or more races. Hispanic or Latino of any race were 6,275 (4.8%) of the population.

The district had 89,904 registered voters as of October 17, 2020, of whom 16,628 (18.5%) were registered as unaffiliated, 29,455 (32.8%) were registered as Republicans, 42,183 (46.9%) were registered as Democrats, and 999 (1.1%) were registered to other parties.

== Political representation ==
The district is represented for the 2023–2027 legislative term in the State Senate by Christopher R. West (R) and in the House of Delegates by Alexander M. Harlan (R, District 42A), Michele J. Guyton (D, District 42B), and Joshua Stonko (R, District 42C).
