= Edith J. Patterson =

American politician (born 1945)

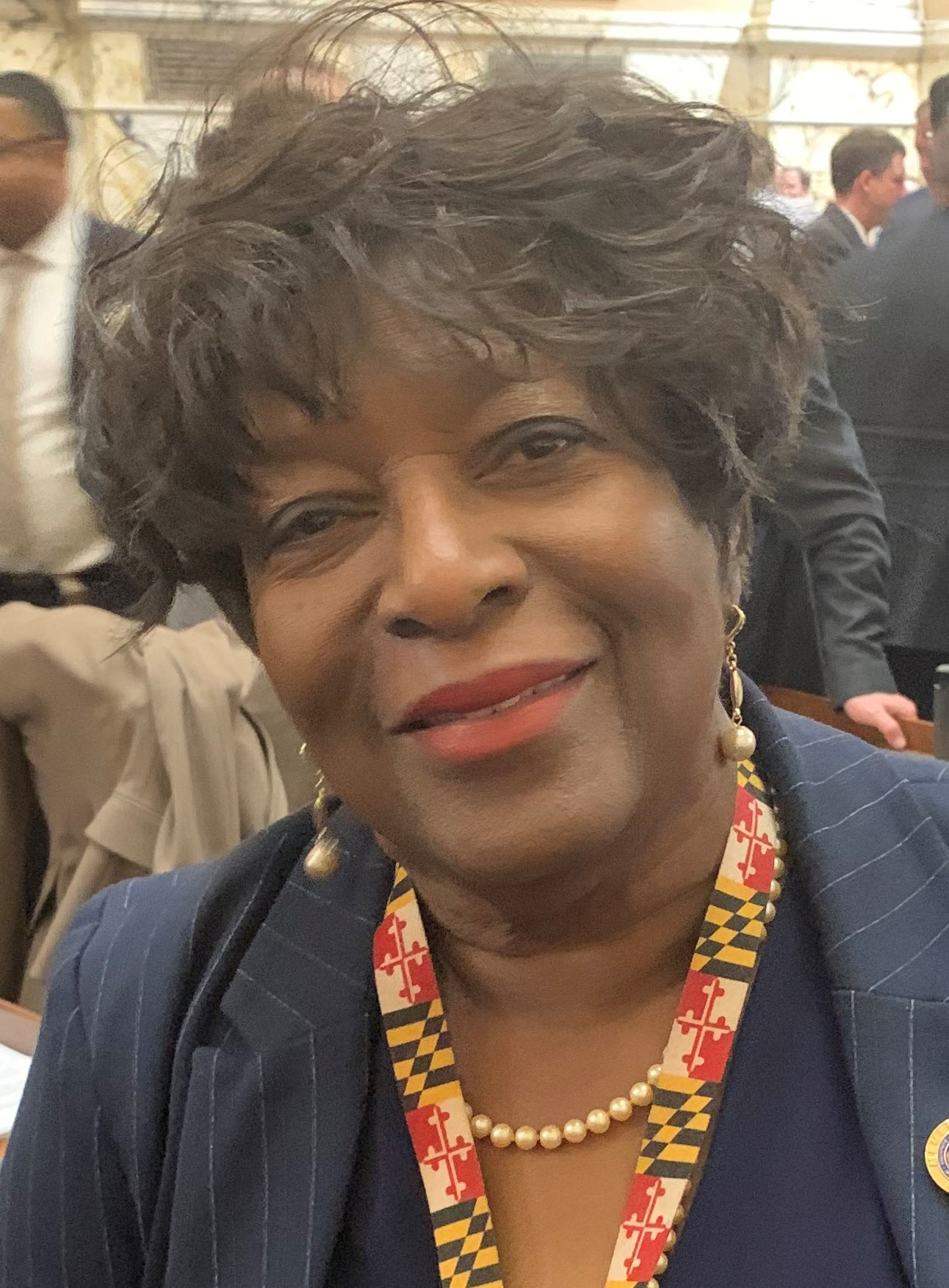

Member of the Maryland House of Delegates from the 28th district
- Incumbent
- Assumed office January 14, 2015 Serving with Sally Y. Jameson, Debra Davis, and C. T. Wilson
- Preceded by: Peter Murphy
- Constituency: Charles County, Maryland

County Commissioner, Charles County, Maryland
- In office December 2002 – December 7, 2010
- Preceded by: F. Wayne Cooper
- Succeeded by: Candice Quinn Kelly

Member, Board of Education, Charles County, Maryland
- In office 1983–1995

Personal details
- Born: November 18, 1945 (age 80) Doswell, Virginia, U.S.
- Spouse: Ralph Patterson (died 2001)
- Children: Three children (Ralph, Robert, and Anne P. Tuggle), two grandchildren
- Education: John M. Gandy High School, Ashland, Virginia
- Alma mater: Virginia Union University, B.S. (biology & chemistry), 1968; Bowie State College, M.Ed., (guidance & counseling), 1973; George Washington University, Ed.D. (higher education administration), 1991

Edith Jerry Patterson (born November 18, 1945) is an American politician who has served as a Democratic member of the Maryland House of Delegates, representing district 28 in Charles County, since 2015. She previously served as a county commissioner from 2002 to 2010 and a member of the Board of Education for Charles County from 1983 to 1995.

== Early life and career ==
Patterson was born in Doswell, Virginia, on November 18, 1945, where she attended John M. Gandy High School in neighboring Ashland. She attended Virginia Union University in 1968, where she earned a B.S. degree in biology and chemistry. After five years of teaching as a biology and physics teacher in Washington, D.C., she moved to Pomfret, Maryland, in 1973, and attended Bowie State University, where she earned a M.Ed. in guidance and counseling, and George Washington University in 1991, where she earned a Ed.D. in higher education administration. After graduating, she worked as a consultant for various groups, including the Congressional Black Caucus, the United States Department of Education, United States Department of Health and Human Services, and the Carnegie Foundation for the Advancement of Teaching.

In 1983, Patterson was elected to the Charles County Board of Education, becoming the first African American to serve on the board. In her final year on the board, she served as its chair.

Patterson entered into politics in 2000 when she became a member of the Charles County Democratic Central Committee. In 2005, the Charles County Democratic Central Committee appointed Patterson to serve as county commissioner, filling a vacancy after commissioner F. Wayne Cooper moved up to the board president after Murray D. Levy resigned to fill a vacancy in the Maryland House of Delegates left by the resignation of state delegate Van Mitchell. She was the first African American to serve on the council and became the first African American elected commissioner alongside commissioners' Vice President Reuben B. Collins II in 2006. In 2010, Patterson lost her re-election bid to Charles County commissioners' President Candice Quinn Kelly by a margin of 114 votes.

In August 2010, Patterson was elected to serve on the Maryland Association of Counties Board of Directors.

In April 2012, Governor Martin O'Malley appointed Patterson to the Maryland Higher Education Commission. In accepting her appointment, Patterson retired after 37 years from the College of Southern Maryland, where she worked as the longtime director of the college's Educational Talent Search program.

In February 2014, Patterson again filed to run for Maryland House of Delegates. She came third place in the Democratic primary with 20.8 percent of the vote, squeaking out a narrow victory of about 700 votes. She received 23.78 percent of the vote in the general election.

In 2004 and 2016, Patterson served as a delegate for the Democratic National Committee.

== In the legislature ==
Patterson was sworn into the Maryland House of Delegates on January 14, 2015.

=== Committee assignments ===
- Ways and Means Committee, 2015–present (election law subcommittee, 2015, 2017–2018; finance resources subcommittee, 2015–2017; education subcommittee, 2016–2019; local revenues subcommittee, 2019, 2021–present; revenues subcommittee, 2019; early childhood subcommittee, 2020; chair, racing & gaming subcommittee, 2020–present)
- Joint Committee on Ending Homelessness, 2016–present
- House Chair, Protocol Committee, 2019

=== Other memberships ===
- House Chair, Charles County Delegation, 2016–present
- Member, Legislative Black Caucus of Maryland, 2015– (2nd vice-chair, 2016–2018; 1st vice-chair, 2018–2019)
- Member, Maryland Veterans Caucus, 2015–present
- 2nd vice-president, Women Legislators of Maryland, 2021–present (member, 2015–present; executive board, at large, 2019–2021)

== Political positions ==
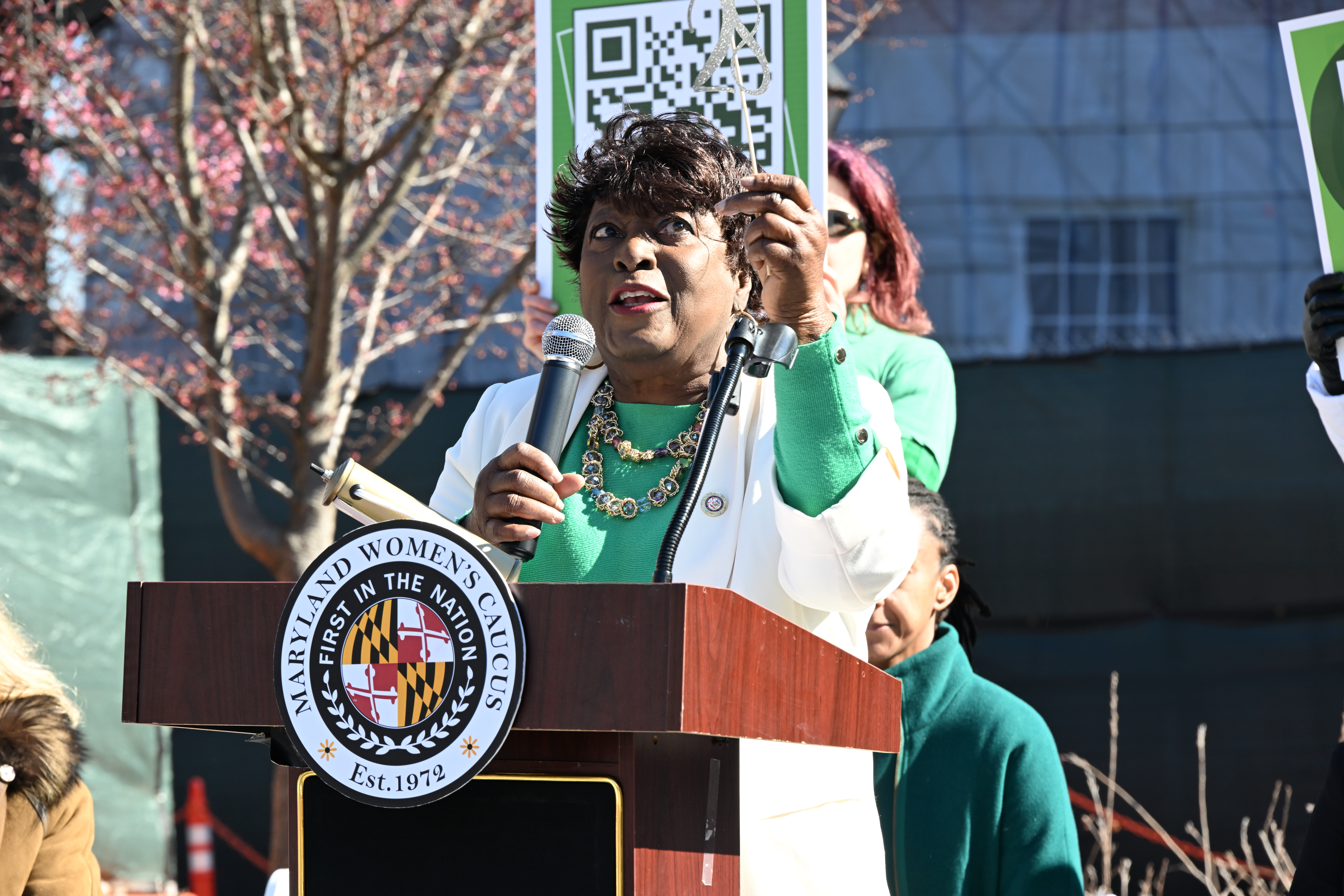
Patterson speaks at an Equal Rights Amendment rally, 2024

=== Education ===
During her 2014 House of Delegates campaign, Patterson said that she supports the objectives of Common Core State Standards, but believes that governments should provide teachers with professional development and training to implement the program.

Following an investigation by Project Baltimore on Maryland private schools, Patterson introduced legislation in the 2019 legislative session that would have required the Maryland Department of Education to provide a list of all non-public schools to local municipalities annually to conduct zoning and fire code inspections. The bill passed the House of Delegates by a vote of 118–17, but was killed by the Senate subcommittee on Education, Health and Environmental Affairs.

In 2022, Patterson said that she opposed legislation introduced by state senator Arthur Ellis that would turn the Charles County campuses of the College of Southern Maryland into a standalone college.

=== Environment ===
Patterson co-sponsored legislation introduced in the 2020 legislative session that bans the intentional release of balloons in Maryland.

=== Marijuana ===
During her 2014 House of Delegates campaign, Patterson said that she supports the use of marijuana for medical or medicinal purposes under medical supervision and use through state licensed distribution centers, but did not support legalizing recreational marijuana, calling it a "gateway drug". She also said that she supports decriminalizing the possession of small amounts of marijuana.

=== Taxes ===
During her 2014 House of Delegates campaign, Patterson said that she supports reviewing regulatory and corporate tax structure and providing tax incentives to start up medium and small technology firms to increase Maryland business competitiveness. She also said that she would support establishing tax-free zones targeted around research and development academic institutions to lure high-technology and cybersecurity business. She supports the intent of Maryland's "rain tax" and "septic bill", but expressed the need to protect support those most affected by the septic bill, especially farmers, through funding at both the state and county level.

== Personal life ==
Patterson was married to Ralph Patterson until his death in 2001. She has three children and two grandchildren and lives in Pomfret, Maryland.

She is a member of the Nu Zeta Omega chapter of the Alpha Kappa Alpha sorority.

== Electoral history ==
2014 Maryland House of Delegates district 28 Democratic primary election
Party	Candidate	Votes	%
Democratic	C. T. Wilson	8,302	25.9
Democratic	Sally Y. Jameson	7,249	22.6
Democratic	Edith J. Patterson	6,644	20.7
Democratic	Candice Quinn Kelly	5,966	18.6
Democratic	John Coller	3,913	12.2

2014 Maryland House of Delegates district 28 election
Party	Candidate	Votes	%
Democratic	Sally Y. Jameson	25,811	28.7
Democratic	C. T. Wilson	24,202	26.9
Democratic	Edith J. Patterson	21,421	23.8
Republican	Jim Crawford	17,312	19.2
Republican	John C. Ford (Write In)	913	1.0
Write-In		419	0.5

2018 Maryland House of Delegates district 28 Democratic primary election
Party	Candidate	Votes	%
Democratic	Edith J. Patterson	10,346	27.4
Democratic	C. T. Wilson	10,053	26.6
Democratic	Debra Davis	8,725	23.1
Democratic	Edward Holland	4,561	12.1
Democratic	John Coller	4,043	10.7

2018 Maryland House of Delegates district 28 election
Party	Candidate	Votes	%
Democratic	Debra Davis	34,236	23.8
Democratic	Edith J. Patterson	33,383	23.2
Democratic	C. T. Wilson	32,793	22.8
Republican	Jim Crawford	15,059	10.5
Republican	Dave Campbell	15,010	10.4
Republican	Maureen Janette Woodruff	13,318	9.3
Write-In		159	0.1
