= William Daniel Mayer =

American politician (1941–2026)

Delegate Maryland District 28
- In office February 1, 2005 – January 10, 2007
- Preceded by: W. Louis Hennessy
- Succeeded by: Murray D. Levy and Peter Murphy
- Constituency: Charles County

Personal details
- Born: October 30, 1941 La Plata, Maryland, U.S.
- Died: May 3, 2026 (aged 84)
- Party: Republican
- Occupation: Politician, real estate broker

William Daniel Mayer (October 30, 1941 – May 3, 2026) was an American politician who served as a member of the Maryland House of Delegates for District 28, which covers Charles County.

== Life and career ==
Mayer was appointed to District 28 in 2005 by former Maryland Governor Bob Ehrlich to replace W. Louis Hennessy, who was appointed to District Court of Maryland, District 4, Charles County. Hennessy was appointed to the position in 2003 to replace Thomas E. Hutchins, who was appointed to Secretary of Veteran Affairs.

Mayer died on May 3, 2026, at the age of 84.

== Election results ==
- 2006 Race for Maryland House of Delegates – District 28

Voters to choose three:

Name	Votes	Percent	Outcome
Sally Y. Jameson, Dem.	24,051	24.5%	Won
Murray Levy, Dem.	23,436	23.9%	Won
Peter Murphy, Dem.	21,190	21.6%	Won
William Daniel Mayer, Rep.	15,978	16.3%	Lost
James H. Crawford, Rep.	13,343	13.6%	Lost
Other Write-Ins	135	0.1%	Lost
