= C. T. Wilson =

American politician (born 1972)

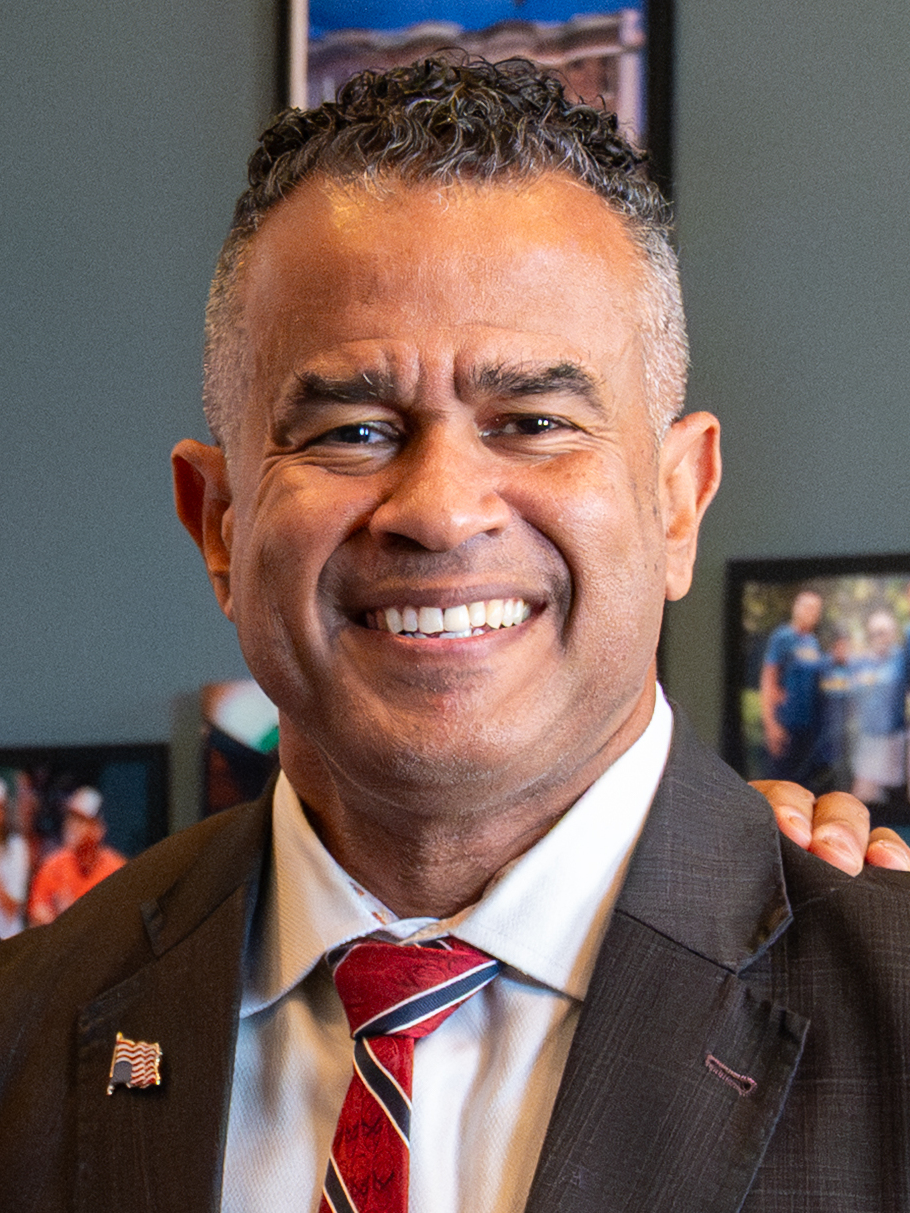
- Wilson in 2026

Member-elect of the Maryland Senate from the 28th district
- Assuming office January 13, 2027
- Succeeding: Arthur Ellis

Member of the Maryland House of Delegates from the 28th district
- Incumbent
- Assumed office January 12, 2011 Serving with Edith J. Patterson and Debra Davis
- Preceded by: Murray Levy

Personal details
- Born: February 20, 1972 (age 54) Missouri, U.S.
- Party: Democratic
- Spouse: Nicole
- Children: 3
- Education: Upper Iowa University (BA); Howard University (JD)

Military service
- Branch/service: United States Army
- Years of service: 1990–1997

C. T. Wilson (born February 20, 1972) is an American politician, military veteran, attorney and former prosecutor who is a member-elect of the Maryland Senate from District 28. A member of the Democratic Party, he represented District 28 in the Maryland House of Delegates since 2011.

Born in Missouri, Wilson lived in several foster homes as a child and was sexually abused by his adoptive father while in foster care. He graduated from Freeburg Community High School, afterwards enlisting as a combat soldier in the U.S. Army and serving in the Persian Gulf and Bosnia and Herzegovina in both combat and medical units. He graduated from Upper Iowa University and the Howard University School of Law, afterwards working in the community prosecution unit of the Prince George's County State's Attorney's office.

Wilson was elected to the Maryland House of Delegates in 2010 and reelected in 2014, 2018, and 2022. In the House, he served as the chair of the Economic Matters Committee from 2021 to 2025, afterwards serving as the parliamentarian in 2026. He was also the sponsor of the Maryland Child Victims Act. Wilson was elected to the Maryland Senate in 2026.

== Background ==
Wilson was born in Missouri. An orphan, he lived in several foster homes as a child. Wilson has stated he was sexually abused and repeatedly raped by his adoptive father, Tom Wilson, while in foster care from the ages of 9 to 15.

Wilson graduated from Freeburg Community High School in Freeburg, Illinois. After high school, at 18, he enlisted as a combat soldier in the U.S. Army from 1990 to 1997. He served in the Persian Gulf and Bosnia and Herzegovina in both combat and medical units. Wilson later graduated cum laude from Upper Iowa University with a B.A. in psychology. He then went on to the Howard University School of Law where he earned a J.D. in 2003, and was admitted to Maryland Bar. After graduating, he helped organize the Community Prosecution Unit of the Prince George's County State's Attorney's Office.

In 2014, Wilson's book, 10,000 Hills: One Boy's Journey was published by CreateSpace. The book follows Wilson's early life story and the sexual abuse he faced from his adoptive father.

== In the legislature ==
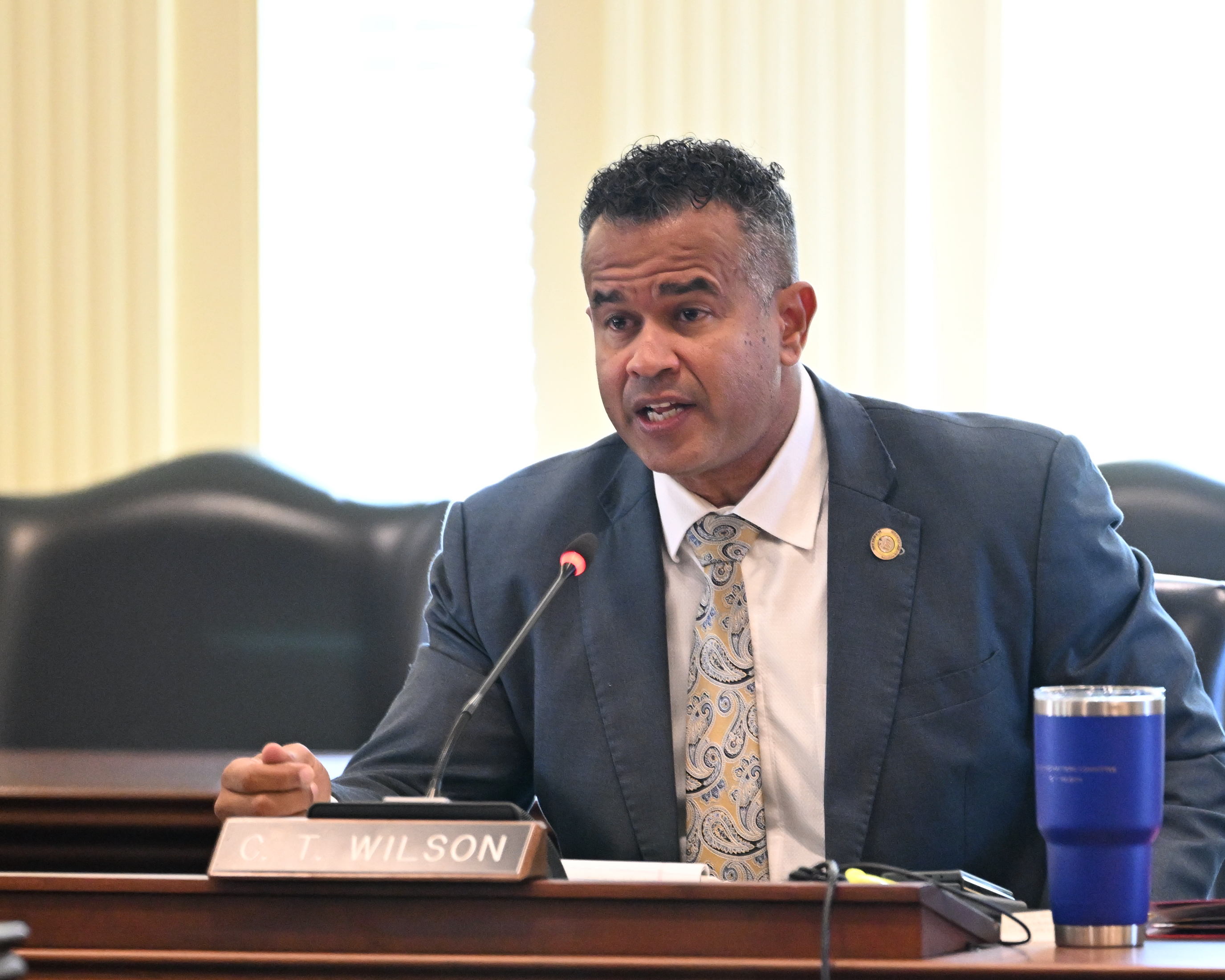
Wilson in the Economic Matters Committee, 2024

Wilson was sworn into the Maryland House of Delegates on January 12, 2011. He is the first Black man elected delegate in Charles County. In December 2021, House Speaker Adrienne A. Jones appointed Wilson chairman of the House Economic Matters Committee, succeeding state delegate Dereck E. Davis. He served as the chair of this committee until December 2025, when House Speaker Joseline Peña-Melnyk named Wilson as the House parliamentarian. Wilson is also member of the Southern Maryland Delegation and the Legislative Black Caucus of Maryland, and served as the House Chair of the Maryland Veterans Caucus from 2014 to 2021.

In December 2025, after Adrienne A. Jones announced that she would step down as Speaker of the Maryland House of Delegates, Wilson announced that he would run for Speaker. Wilson dropped out of the race a few days later, endorsing Joseline Peña-Melnyk.

In February 2026, Wilson announced that he would run for the Maryland Senate in 2026, in anticipation of state senator Arthur Ellis announcing that he would run for Congress in Maryland's 5th congressional district. Wilson defeated Aaron Corbin in the Democratic primary on June 23, 2026, with 75.5% of the vote, and ran unopposed in the general election. He was assigned to the Senate Finance Committee at the start of the 2027 legislative session.

== Political positions ==
Wilson has described himself as a moderate Democrat.

=== Education ===
During the 2021 legislative session, Wilson introduced legislation to require the Maryland State Board of Education to create statewide standards for teaching Black history to public school students. The bill was reintroduced during the 2022 legislative session.

In 2022, Wilson opposed legislation to break up the College of Southern Maryland to create a new Charles County Community College.

=== Electoral reform ===
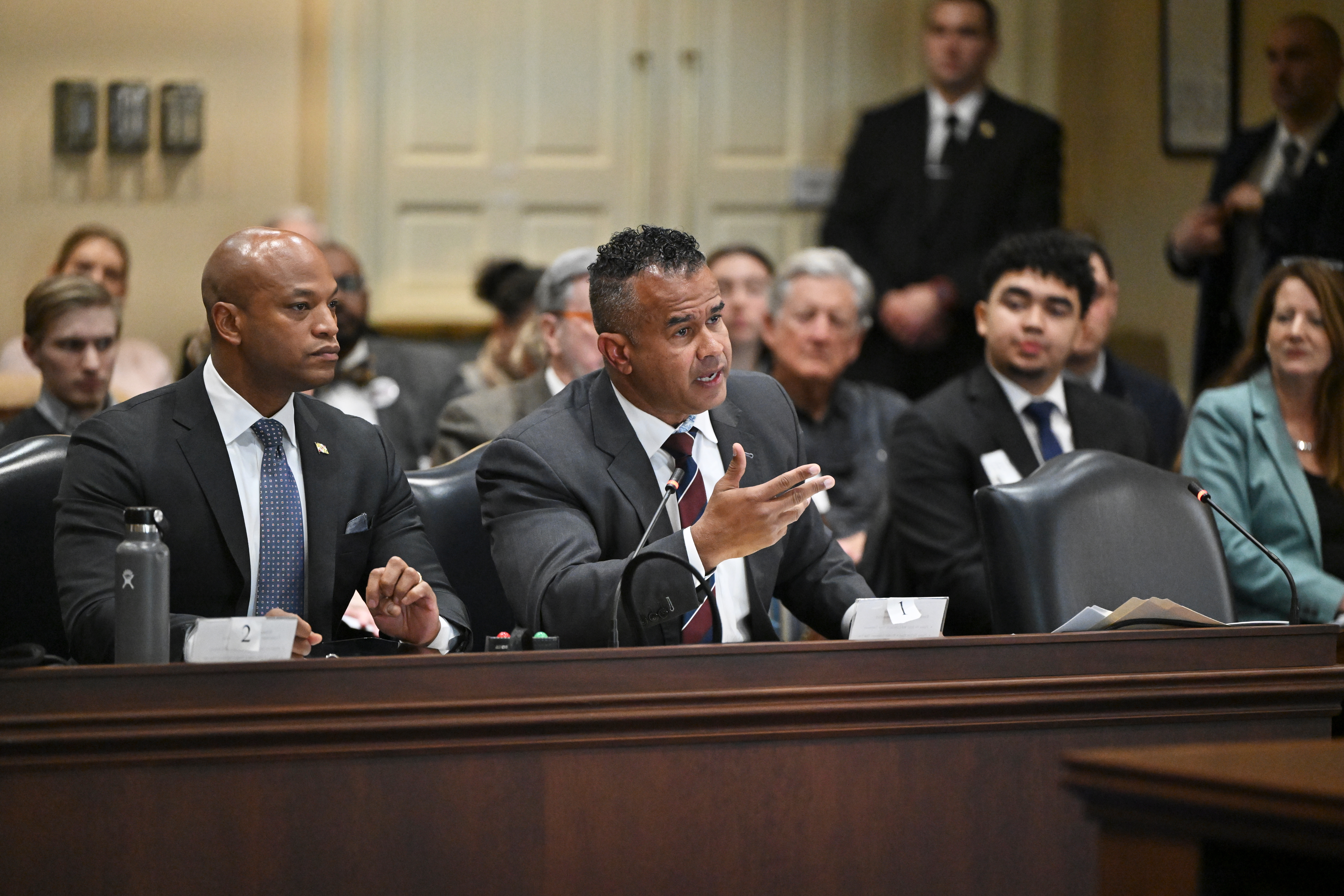
Wilson and Maryland governor Wes Moore testify in support of legislation to redraw Maryland's congressional districts, 2026

In 2016, Wilson voted against overriding Governor Larry Hogan's veto on legislation that would restore voting rights to felons on parole and probation.

In November 2025, House Speaker Adrienne Jones appointed Wilson to the Governor's Redistricting Advisory Commission, a body formed by Governor Wes Moore to study mid-decade redistricting in Maryland. In January 2026, Wilson voted to recommend a congressional redistricting map that would increase the Democratic Party's chances of winning Maryland's 1st congressional district, the only one represented by a Republican, after which he introduced the bill to adopt the map for the 2026 elections.

During the 2026 legislative session, Wilson expressed concerns with the Maryland Voting Rights Act, which would allow challenges to counties or municipalities that hold elections in a way that dilutes the votes cast by minority voters, saying that he was "terrified with putting voting rights in the hands of a judge". At the same time, he said that he had "no intentions on stopping this bill from moving forward".

=== Environment ===
In August 2025, Wilson criticized the Trump administration's plans to revoke federal offshore wind permits for US Wind's proposed wind farm off the coast of Ocean City, Maryland, calling its stoppage "shortsighted" and saying that there's "nothing that they're going to say to replace it besides, 'drill, baby, drill'".

=== Justice reform ===
Wilson opposed legislation to repeal the death penalty in Maryland, saying, "I wish we did not need the death penalty... but I've seen the worst of the worst, and I know it's necessary." During the debate on the bill in 2013, Wilson opposed an amendment to keep execution as an option for those who kill after being sentenced to death or life in prison. The amendment failed by a 61–77 vote.

=== Labor ===
During the 2022 legislative session, Wilson introduced a bill to provide up to 12 weeks of paid family leave to all Maryland workers. During a hearing on the bill, he introduced an amendment to replace the bill with a commission to investigate how to implement a statewide paid family leave program. The bill was later restored and passed with an effective date of 2025 in a compromise with Wilson. The bill became law after the General Assembly voted to override Governor Larry Hogan's veto on April 9, 2022.

During the 2026 legislative session, citing efforts by the second Trump administration to weaken the National Labor Relations Board, Wilson introduced a bill to establish the Maryland Labor Relations Board, which would provide state-level protections for private sector workers and settle labor union disputes.

=== National politics ===
During the 2026 legislative session, Wilson opposed a resolution to honor Charlie Kirk, saying that he "refused to honor a man who helped drive a wedge between my people, my community, and everyone around", citing controversial statements made by Kirk on his podcast.

=== Policing ===
Following the 2015 Baltimore protests, Wilson called on finding a "middle ground" on police reform legislation. During the 2021 legislative session, Wilson introduced legislation requiring police officers to identify themselves and notify individuals of their right to refuse to speak or provide information during a traffic stop.

=== Social issues ===
Wilson opposed a bill introduced in the 2011 legislative session to legalize same-sex marriage in Maryland, saying "I'm taking the courageous stance. I have not had a chance to take this to my constituents and get their opinion."

Wilson introduced legislation in the 2012 legislative session to make it a felony offense to transfer knowingly, or attempt to transfer, HIV to another person.

During the 2014 legislative session, Wilson introduced a resolution to urge the owners of the Washington Redskins to change the football team's name to something that "is not offensive to Native Americans or any other group".

Wilson introduced legislation in the 2015 legislative session to make March 30 "Welcome Home Vietnam Veterans Day". The bill passed and was signed into law by Governor Larry Hogan on March 30, 2015.

During the 2017 legislative session, Wilson introduced legislation extending the statute of limitations on child sexual abuse cases from age 25 to age 38. The bill was introduced in previous legislative sessions but was blocked by Catholic Church lobbyists and Delegate Joseph F. Vallario Jr., the chair of the House Judiciary Committee. The bill passed and was signed into law by Governor Larry Hogan on April 4, 2017. In 2019, he introduced a bill to abolish the statute of limitations on child sexual assault cases, which the Senate Judiciary Committee later voted down after passing the House of Delegates by a vote of 135–3. Later that day, the House Judiciary Committee agreed to include compromise provisions in legislation introduced by Senator Justin Ready, including one to increase the statute of limitations to the age of 58. He re-introduced, and later withdrew, this bill during the 2021 legislative session.

In 2021, he supported legislation that would lower the state's age of mental health consent to 12 years old.

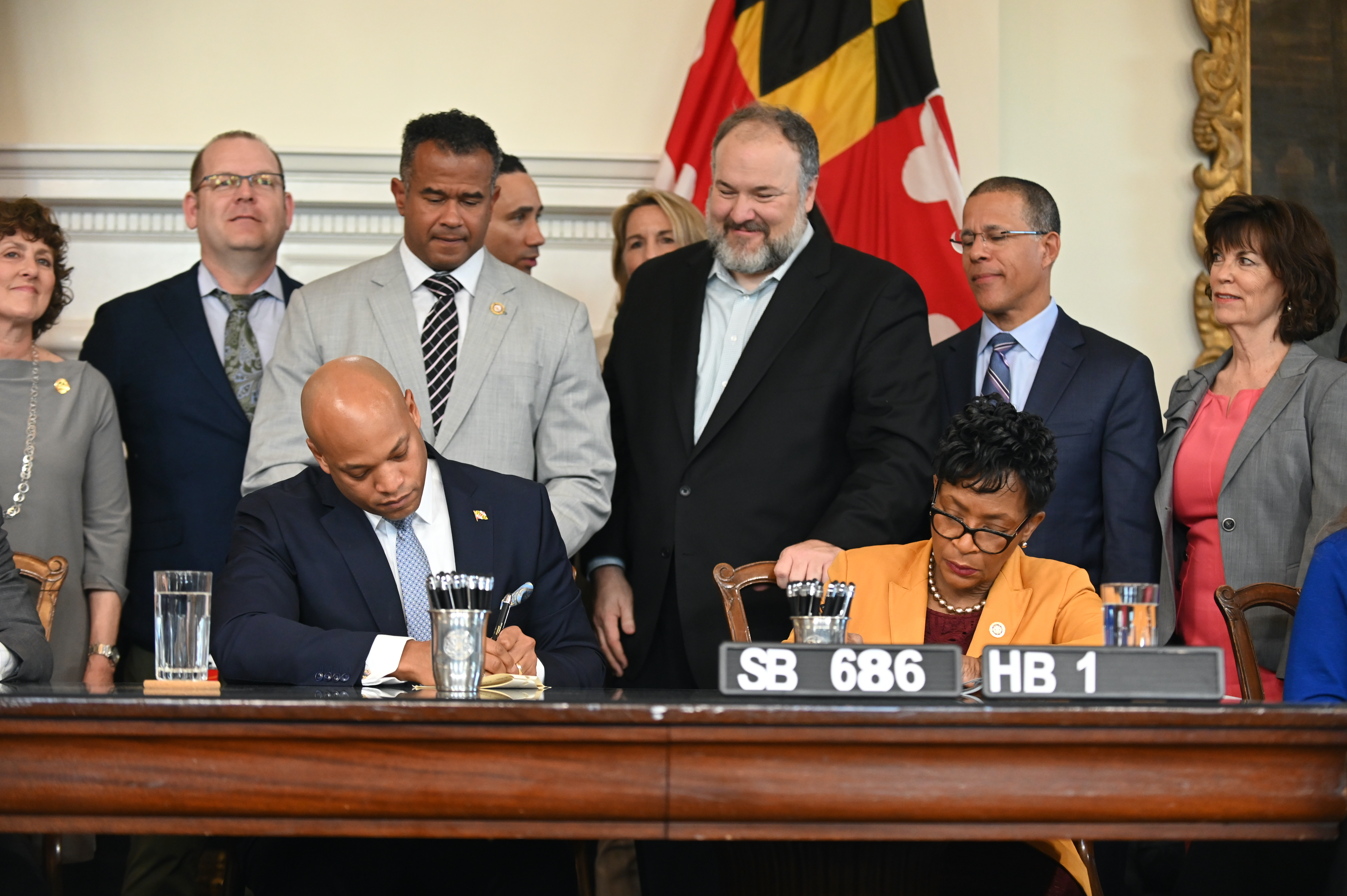
Wilson (center left) and others join Governor Wes Moore for the signing of the Maryland Child Victims Act, 2023

In November 2022, following the conclusion of a years-long investigation by the Attorney General of Maryland into accusations of sexual assault in the Roman Catholic Archdiocese of Baltimore, Wilson introduced the Maryland Child Victims Act, a bill to eliminate the statute of limitations on child sexual abuse lawsuits and create a "look back window" to allow survivors to file lawsuits alleging past sexual abuse. The Maryland Catholic Conference, who had previously lobbied against bills eliminating the statute of limitations, said that they would support eliminating the statute of limitations but opposed provisions of the bill creating the look back window. The bill passed and was signed into law by Governor Wes Moore on April 11, 2023.

== Personal life ==
Wilson is a Maryland Foster Youth Resource Center boardmember and a National Eagle Scout Association member. He and his wife Nicole have three daughters.

== Electoral history ==
Maryland House of Delegates District 28 Democratic primary election, 2010
Party	Candidate	Votes	%
Democratic	Sally Y. Jameson	7,507	25.4
Democratic	Peter Murphy	6,444	21.8
Democratic	C. T. Wilson	5,666	19.1
Democratic	Gary V. Hodge	3,335	11.3
Democratic	Jim Easter	3,155	10.7
Democratic	Bud Humbert	2,475	8.4
Democratic	Craig James Hickerson	1,016	3.4

Maryland House of Delegates District 28 election, 2010
Party	Candidate	Votes	%
Democratic	Sally Y. Jameson	28,092	23.6
Democratic	Peter Murphy	26,006	21.9
Democratic	C. T. Wilson	23,619	19.9
Republican	Kirk W. Bowie	14,577	12.3
Republican	Mike Phillips	13,750	11.6
Republican	Daniel D. Richards	12,844	10.8
Write-in		69	0.1

Maryland House of Delegates District 28 Democratic primary election, 2014
Party	Candidate	Votes	%
Democratic	C. T. Wilson	8,302	25.9
Democratic	Sally Y. Jameson	7,249	22.6
Democratic	Edith J. Patterson	6,644	20.7
Democratic	Candice Quinn Kelly	5,966	18.6
Democratic	John Coller	3,913	12.2

Maryland House of Delegates District 28 election, 2014
Party	Candidate	Votes	%
Democratic	Sally Y. Jameson	25,811	28.7
Democratic	C. T. Wilson	24,202	26.9
Democratic	Edith J. Patterson	21,421	23.8
Republican	Jim Crawford	17,312	19.2
Write-in		1,332	1.5

Maryland House of Delegates District 28 Democratic primary election, 2018
Party	Candidate	Votes	%
Democratic	Edith J. Patterson	10,346	27.4
Democratic	C. T. Wilson	10,053	26.6
Democratic	Debra Davis	8,725	23.1
Democratic	Edward Holland	4,561	12.1
Democratic	John Coller	4,043	10.7

Maryland House of Delegates District 28 election, 2018
Party	Candidate	Votes	%
Democratic	Debra Davis	34,236	23.8
Democratic	Edith J. Patterson	33,383	23.2
Democratic	C. T. Wilson	32,793	22.8
Republican	Jim Crawford	15,059	10.5
Republican	Dave Campbell	15,010	10.4
Republican	Maureen Janette Woodruff	13,318	9.3
Write-in		159	0.1

== Bibliography ==
- 10,000 Hills: One Boy's Journey, CreateSpace Independent Publishing Platform, 2014. ISBN 9781495463235
