= Van Mitchell =

American politician (born 1955)

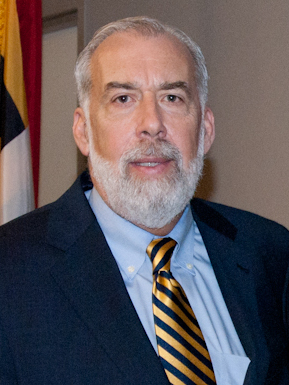
- Mitchell in 2016

Maryland Secretary of Health and Mental Hygiene
- In office February 13, 2015 – December 15, 2016; Acting: January 21, 2015 – February 13, 2015
- Governor: Larry Hogan
- Preceded by: Joshua Sharfstein
- Succeeded by: Dennis Schrader

Member of the Maryland House of Delegates from the 28th district
- In office January 11, 1995 – September 30, 2004
- Preceded by: Redistricting
- Succeeded by: Murray D. Levy

Personal details
- Born: November 28, 1955 (age 70) La Plata, Maryland, U.S.
- Party: Democratic
- Children: 2
- Education: Campbell University

Van T. Mitchell (born November 28, 1955) is an American politician who served as the Secretary of the Maryland Department of Health from 2015 to 2016. A member of the Democratic Party, Mitchell previously served as the principal deputy secretary of the Maryland Department of Health from 2004 to 2007 and as a member of the Maryland House of Delegates from 1995 to 2004.

== Early life and education ==
Mitchell was born in La Plata, Maryland, on November 28, 1955. He graduated from La Plata High School before attending Campbell University.

== Career ==
Mitchell was the chief executive officer of MSI Inc., a construction supply business, from 1985 to 2006. His company's warehouse and lumber yard were destroyed during the 2002 La Plata tornado. After Governor Bob Ehrlich left office in 2007, Mitchell worked as an associate for Manis, Canning and Associates from 2008 to 2015, and as a lobbyist for Cornerstone Government Affairs since 2017.

Mitchell first became involved in politics in 1982, when he became a member of the Charles County Democratic Central Committee. He served on the Town of La Plata's Business District Commission and the Charles County Community College Board of Trustees from 1993 to 1995.

=== Maryland House of Delegates ===
Mitchell was elected to the Maryland House of Delegates in 1994 and sworn in on January 11, 1995. He was a member of the Economic Matters Committee from 1995 to 2003, including as the chair of its workers compensation subcommittee from 1999 to 2003, the Appropriations Committee in 2003, and the Environmental Matters Committee in 2004. He was also the chair of the Southern Maryland Delegation from 1996 to 2002 and the Charles County Delegation from 2003 to 2004. During his tenure, Mitchell supported efforts to increase funding for school construction and local highways, including the construction of bypasses around Waldorf and Hughesville.

In April 2004, Mitchell announced that he would not seek re-election in 2006, saying that he wanted to spend more time working at his business and with local charities. He resigned from office early after Governor Bob Ehrlich appointed him as principal deputy secretary of the Maryland Department of Health in September 2004.

=== Maryland Department of Health ===
On December 23, 2014, Maryland Governor-elect Larry Hogan appointed Mitchell to be his Secretary for the Department of Health and Mental Hygiene. Mitchell's appointment was confirmed by the Maryland Senate on February 13, 2015, and he was sworn in later that day. During his tenure, Mitchell focused on efforts to tackle the opioid epidemic in Maryland and oversaw the state's response to a capacity crisis at state hospitals from mid-to-late 2016.

On December 15, 2016, amid pressure from state legislators to more promptly care for criminal defendants awaiting psychological evaluations, Mitchell resigned as Secretary of Health effective immediately to "pursue opportunities in the private sector". He was succeeded by Dennis Schrader, who previously served as Governor Hogan's appointments secretary.

In August 2019, Maryland Senate President Thomas V. Miller Jr. and House Speaker Adrienne A. Jones named Mitchell to serve as the chair of the Maryland Prescription Drug Affordability Board. Mitchell stepped down from the board in August 2026, and was succeeded by Bonnie Cullison.

== Personal life ==
Mitchell is married and has two children.

== Electoral history ==
Maryland House of Delegates District 28 Democratic primary election, 1994
Party	Candidate	Votes	%
Democratic	Samuel C. Linton	3,987	21.4
Democratic	Van T. Mitchell	3,427	18.4
Democratic	Ruth Ann Hall	3,388	18.2
Democratic	Warren A. Bowie	2,967	16.0
Democratic	Edith J. Patterson	2,649	14.2
Democratic	Scott Hunter	2,175	11.7

Maryland House of Delegates District 28 election, 1994
Party	Candidate	Votes	%
Democratic	Van T. Mitchell	12,289	17.9
Democratic	Samuel C. Linton	11,993	17.5
Republican	Thomas E. Hutchins	11,507	16.8
Republican	Gerald Schuster	11,416	16.6
Democratic	Ruth Ann Hall	11,176	16.3
Republican	Adam M. O'Kelley	10,295	15.0

Maryland House of Delegates District 28 election, 1998
Party	Candidate	Votes	%
Republican	Thomas E. Hutchins (incumbent)	18,012	22.8
Democratic	Van T. Mitchell (incumbent)	17,835	22.6
Democratic	Samuel C. Linton (incumbent)	17,268	21.9
Republican	James Crawford	12,780	16.2
Republican	Michael D. Hathaway	11,757	14.9
Republican	George C. Vann (write-in)	1,333	1.7

Maryland House of Delegates District 28 election, 2002
Party	Candidate	Votes	%
Republican	Thomas E. Hutchins (incumbent)	19,037	20.3
Democratic	Sally Y. Jameson	18,476	19.7
Democratic	Van T. Mitchell (incumbent)	18,238	19.5
Democratic	Jim Jarboe	16,577	17.7
Republican	James Crawford	12,109	12.9
Republican	Robert Boudreaux	9,289	9.9
Write-in		48	0.1
