= Thomas E. Hutchins =

American politician (born 1945)

Secretary of Maryland State Police
- In office December 10, 2003 – June 6, 2007
- Preceded by: Ed Norris
- Succeeded by: Terrence B. Sheridan

Secretary of the Maryland Department of Veterans Affairs
- In office February 12, 2003 – December 10, 2003
- Preceded by: Thomas Bratten

Member of the Maryland House of Delegates from the 28th district
- In office January 11, 1995 – February 11, 2003
- Succeeded by: W. Louis Hennessy
- Constituency: Charles County, Maryland

Personal details
- Born: October 7, 1945 (age 81) Baltimore, Maryland, U.S.
- Party: Republican

Thomas E. Hutchins (born October 7, 1945) is an American politician who was a member of the Maryland House of Delegates for District 28, which covers a portion of Charles County, Maryland, prior to being selected to be the secretary of Maryland State Police.

== Education ==
Hutchins was born in Baltimore and graduated from Calvert Senior High School in Prince Frederick, Maryland. He holds a master's degree in state and local government from the University of Maryland, University College, with undergraduate degrees in law enforcement and sociology from UMUC and an associate degree from Charles County Community College in criminal justice. Hutchins has graduated from several significant professional schools associated with law enforcement and military professions. He is a 1990 graduate of the United States Army Sergeants Major Academy in El Paso, Texas, and a graduate of the 29th FBI National Executive Institute in Quantico, Virginia, and the Command Programme, Bramshill Police College in Bramshill, England.

In February 2005 then Colonel Hutchins was presented with an honorary degree from the College of Southern Maryland for his dedication to the college in which he began his academic quest and for bringing focus to the importance of public service based on his two lifetime careers in the fields of military and law enforcement. Hutchins founded a scholarship endowment for military veterans who enroll in the law enforcement/public safety academic track at the College of Southern Maryland.

== Career ==
After serving in the military, Delegate Hutchins was a Maryland State Police trooper. Elected to office three times, he served on the judiciary committee, in addition to the gaming law & regulation, and criminal justice subcommittees, to name a few.

Colonel Thomas E. Hutchins was appointed by Governor Larry Hogan January 21, 2015 as Director of the Governor's Office for Homeland Security. Hutchins served as personal advisor to the governor on all homeland security issues from counter terrorism to disasters. In addition he supervised a portfolio of Cabinet agencies including the departments of: State Police, Military, Public Safety and Correctional Services, Veterans Affairs, Information Technology, Institute for Emergency Medical Service System, Emergency Management Agency, and the Office of Crime Control and Prevention. During his tenure Hutchins provided key advice to these cabinet agencies guiding them through the transition and several critical incidents to include the riots in Baltimore City during April 2015.

In 2003, Delegate Hutchins resigned from the Maryland House of Delegates to accept an appointment as Secretary of Veterans Affairs by Governor Robert Ehrlich. He served in this position for less than a year when he was appointed as the secretary of the Maryland State Police, also by Governor Erhlich. He replaced Ed Norris, who resigned after a criminal indictment. Ed Norris is also the former Baltimore City Chief of Police appointed by then Baltimore Mayor Martin O'Malley. Hutchins was appointed by Governor Robert L. Ehrlich Jr. as secretary of the Department of Maryland State Police and the superintendent of the Maryland State Police on December 10, 2003. Hutchins was confirmed as secretary of the Department of Maryland State Police by the Maryland Senate in an unprecedented event when he received confirmation in a unanimous vote of approval on the Senate floor without ever being referred to a committee for review. He is no stranger to the Maryland State Police, having served in the department more than two decades before his retirement in 1994. During his career with the State Police, Hutchins served in every bureau of the department and broadened his experience through key assignments outside the department. In the history of the Maryland State Police, he is the fourth trooper to come from the ranks of the department and be appointed superintendent.

Several significant highlights of his state police career are his command of the State Police Academy / Training Division, which included outreach and training to several foreign countries. He was also instrumental in the formation and leadership of the Maryland State Police Special Tactical Assault Team Element, training them in urban and rural tactics to counter high threat situations, Air Assault Insertion and Rescue Operations, also participating in numerous operations. One accomplishment in Hutchins' career that is little known arose from his observations and subsequent traffic stop of a suspicious person which turned out to be the second secretary of the Soviet Embassy. According to the FBI this encounter uncovered one of the highest-ranking Soviet KGB agents ever identified in the United States at that time. That agent was ultimately found to be involved with John Walker, the U.S. Navy spy who inflicted significant damage to the U.S. intelligence network and the defense of this nation during the later part of Cold War era.

In 2007, newly elected Governor Martin O'Malley fired Hutchins and replaced him with Baltimore County Police Chief Terrence B. Sheridan. O'Malley was criticized by Maryland State Senate President Thomas V. Mike Miller for removing Hutchins, who was the last appointed cabinet member remaining from the Ehrlich administration and the last member of the cabinet from Southern Maryland.

During the period 2007 through 2013, Hutchins provided strategic planning assistance to JTF International a non-governmental organization enhancing law enforcement services in the Provincial Police Department of Cordoba, Argentina. Additionally, he worked as a contractor providing strategic planning and liaison support to the Department of Defense NGB J32 Counterdrug Division.

== Controversy ==
In 2008 it was revealed that the Maryland State Police had included 53 names of non-violent protesters in several databases that track suspected terrorists, despite the lack of any evidence of crimes being committed. This action was taken under authorization from Hutchins, who at the time was serving as the state police superintendent. During testimony before the Maryland Senate Judicial Proceedings Committee, in which he voluntarily testified on the record, he stated "if it happened during my tenure then I am ultimately responsible"; he apologized for the actions that had been taken by certain members of the department stating that those names should not have been entered into that data base. He further stated on the record, that one of those named did in fact raise concerns for violence due to past actions and statements and went on to say that "sometimes advocacy groups can have one or more fringe people who have their own agenda" meaning they attach themselves to the group. Hutchins closed by saying the last thing you want is the Superintendent standing before you after a catastrophe to explain why preventive actions were not taken.

== Election results ==
- 2002 Race for Maryland House of Delegates – District 28

Voters to choose three:

Name	Votes	Percent	Outcome
Thomas E. Hutchins, Rep.	19,037	20.3%	Won
Sally Jameson, Dem.	18,476	19.7%	Won
Van Mitchell, Dem.	18,238	19.5%	Won
Jim Jarboe, Dem.	16,577	17.7%	Lost
James Crawford, Rep.	12,109	12.9%	Lost
Robert Boudreaux, Rep.	9,289	9.9%	Lost

- 1998 Race for Maryland House of Delegates – District 28

Voters to choose three:

Name	Votes	Percent	Outcome
Thomas E. Hutchins, Rep.	18,012	23%	Won
Van Mitchell, Dem.	17,835	23%	Won
Samuel C. Linton, Dem.	17,268	22%	Won
James Crawford, Rep.	12,780	16%	Lost
Michael D. Hathaway, Rep.	11,756	15%	Lost
George C. Vann, Rep.	1,333	2%	Lost

- 1994 Race for Maryland House of Delegates – District 28

Voters to choose three:

Name	Votes	Percent	Outcome
Van Mitchell, Dem.	12,289	18%	Won
Samuel C. Linton, Dem.	11,993	17%	Won
Thomas E. Hutchins, Rep.	11,507	17%	Won
Gerald Schuster, Rep.	11,416	17%	Lost
Ruth Ann Hall, Dem.	11,176	16%	Lost
Adam M. O'Kelley, Dem.	10,295	15%	Lost
