= W. Louis Hennessy =

American politician

Associate Judge, 4th District Court of Maryland
- In office February 1, 2005 – June 30, 2022
- Succeeded by: Patrick J. Devine

Member of the Maryland House of Delegates from District 28
- In office February 11, 2003 – January 31, 2005
- Preceded by: Thomas E. Hutchins
- Succeeded by: William Daniel Mayer
- Constituency: Charles County, MD

Personal details
- Born: January 4, 1955 (age 71) Washington, D.C., U.S.
- Party: Republican
- Profession: lawyer, politician, judge
- Website: Official website

W. Louis Hennessy (born January 4, 1955) is an American jurist who served as judge in the District Court for Charles County, Maryland. He was also a member of the Maryland House of Delegates for District 28.

== Background ==
Hennessy was originally appointed to the District 28 seat of the Maryland House of Delegates in 2003 when Thomas E. Hutchins resigned to accept an appointment to the position of Secretary of Veterans Affairs. Hennessy remained in this seat for two years when he was himself appointed, this time to the 4th District Court of Maryland in 2005 by former Maryland Governor Bob Ehrlich.

== Education ==
Hennessy graduated in 1995 from the University of Maryland, College Park with his Bachelor's in Arts. In 1997 he graduated from the University of Maryland School of Law with his J.D.

== Career ==
Hennessy was a commander of the Homicide Investigations Branch for the Metropolitan Police Department of the District of Columbia from 1993 until 1995. He was a member of the Metropolitan Police Department from 1973 until 1998. He also served as an attorney for Buchanan & Hennessy, P.A. and of Counsel for Asbill Moffitt & Boss.

Outside of work, Hennessy was a member of the Tri-County Council for Southern Maryland.

== In the legislature ==
Hennessy served on the Judiciary Committee and was a member of the Special Committee on Drug and Alcohol Abuse, the Rules and Executive Nominations Committee, and the Medical Malpractice Insurance Work Group, 2004. He never sought election during this time as he was appointed to the position mid-term and appointed out, also in mid-term.

== On the bench ==
In August 2021, Hennessy was accused of offering legal advice to friends facing domestic violence charges and allegedly showing bias against women and domestic violence victims. In May 2022, the Maryland Commission on Judicial Disabilities recommended that Hennessy be suspended for three years without pay, with all but nine months suspended. Hennessy retired on June 30, 2022, and was succeeded by former Charles County circuit judge Patrick J. Devine. Upon appeal, the Maryland Court of Appeals dismissed the matter in light of his retirement.
