= Maryland Child Victims Act =

Maryland, US law

Maryland State Legislature
- Full name: Civil Actions - Child Sexual Abuse - Definition, Damages, and Statute of Limitations
- Introduced: November 16, 2022
- House voted: March 20, 2023 (132–2)
- Senate voted: March 23, 2023 (42–4)
- Sponsor(s): C. T. Wilson; William C. Smith Jr.
- Governor: Wes Moore
- Bill: HB 1
- Associated bills: SB 686
- Website: Legislation

Status: Current legislation

The Maryland Child Victims Act is a law in the U.S. state of Maryland passed by the Maryland General Assembly during the 445th legislative session in 2023 and signed into law by Governor Wes Moore. It retroactively and prospectively repeals the statute of limitations on child sexual abuse lawsuits and raises the liability limits for a single plaintiff for claims against private institutions. Its first version was introduced by former Democratic state senator James Brochin in 2007. Iterations of the proposal were put forth during the 425th, 435th, 436th, 437th, 439th, 441st, 442nd, and 445th legislative sessions.

In February 2019, after the Pennsylvania Attorney General released a report into the grand jury investigation of Catholic Church sexual abuse in Pennsylvania, Maryland Attorney General Brian Frosh launched an investigation into sexual abuse in the Archdiocese of Baltimore. The final report was released in November 2022, identifying 600 victims of sexual abuse and accusing 158 Catholic priests of sexual abuse. The Child Victims Act was reintroduced to the General Assembly, with provisions raising the liability limits for a single plaintiff against private institutions to $1.5 million. The bill passed both chambers with overwhelming support and was signed into law by Governor Moore on April 11, 2023.

The Child Victims Act was subject to legal challenges by the Archdiocese of Washington, which argued that the law was unconstitutional because of the statute of repose passed by the General Assembly in 2017. The Supreme Court of Maryland ruled in February 2025 that the Child Victims Act superseded the 2017 law and was constitutional. In 2025, after state budget analysts found that the law could have significant fiscal impacts on the state, the General Assembly passed a bill lowering a plaintiff's liability limits, which was signed into law by Governor Moore.

== Background ==
Legislative efforts to reform Maryland's statute of limitations for sexual abuse lawsuits started in 2015, and saw some success with the passing of a 2017 bill expanding the statute of limitations to until the victim turns 38 years old, but were largely limited by lobbying efforts by the Maryland Catholic Conference—a Catholic Church lobbying organization representing the Archdiocese of Baltimore, Archdiocese of Washington, and the Diocese of Wilmington. According to lobbying records analyzed by The Baltimore Banner, the dioceses have spent more than $1 million on lobbying efforts to disrupt these efforts since 2017, including $200,000 toward hiring former lawmakers and government officials (most notably Robert Zirkin and former Martin O'Malley spokesperson Rick Abbruzzese) as lobbyists.

In February 2019, following the Pennsylvania Attorney General's release of the report into the grand jury investigation of Catholic Church sexual abuse in Pennsylvania, Maryland Attorney General Brian Frosh reportedly hired Elizabeth Embry, the former chief of the attorney general's criminal division, to lead a probe of sex abuse in the Archdiocese of Baltimore. Archbishop William E. Lori confirmed in September 2018 that the archdiocese was under investigation by the state and said that it had given the attorney general more than 50,000 pages of internal documents dating back to 1965. The Office of the Attorney General concluded its investigation on November 17, 2022, and later released a 456-page report identifying 600 victims of sexual abuse and accusing 158 Catholic priests, including 43 that were previously never publicly identified by the Archdiocese, of sexual abuse.

In September 2025, the Supreme Court of Maryland heard arguments on the release of the Attorney General's unredacted report on child sexual abuse by the Baltimore Archdiocese. On April 27, 2026, the Supreme Court ruled that Maryland could not publicize the names of clergy and staff who were cited in a grand jury probe of sexual assault of children, but never charged with any crimes.

== Impact ==
Law firms and attorneys began advertising services to abuse survivors shortly after the bill was signed into law. Lawsuits against the archdiocese as well as Maryland's juvenile justice system and school system were filed days after the Child Victims Act went into effect on October 1, 2023.

=== Legal challenges ===
In November 2023, the Archdiocese of Washington filed a lawsuit challenging the Child Victims Act, arguing that the law violated the statute of repose provision in the 2017 bill. Attorneys representing multiple victims of child sexual abuse from members of the Catholic clergy from the Washington archdiocese defended the law by arguing that the archdiocese's lawyers had misinterpreted prior precedents set by the Maryland Supreme Court on the legislature's ability to modify the statute of limitations. Maryland Attorney General Anthony Brown also defended the law in court, arguing that the court siding with the archdiocese "would be unprecedented and would go against the consensus of federal law and the reasoned opinions of many other states."

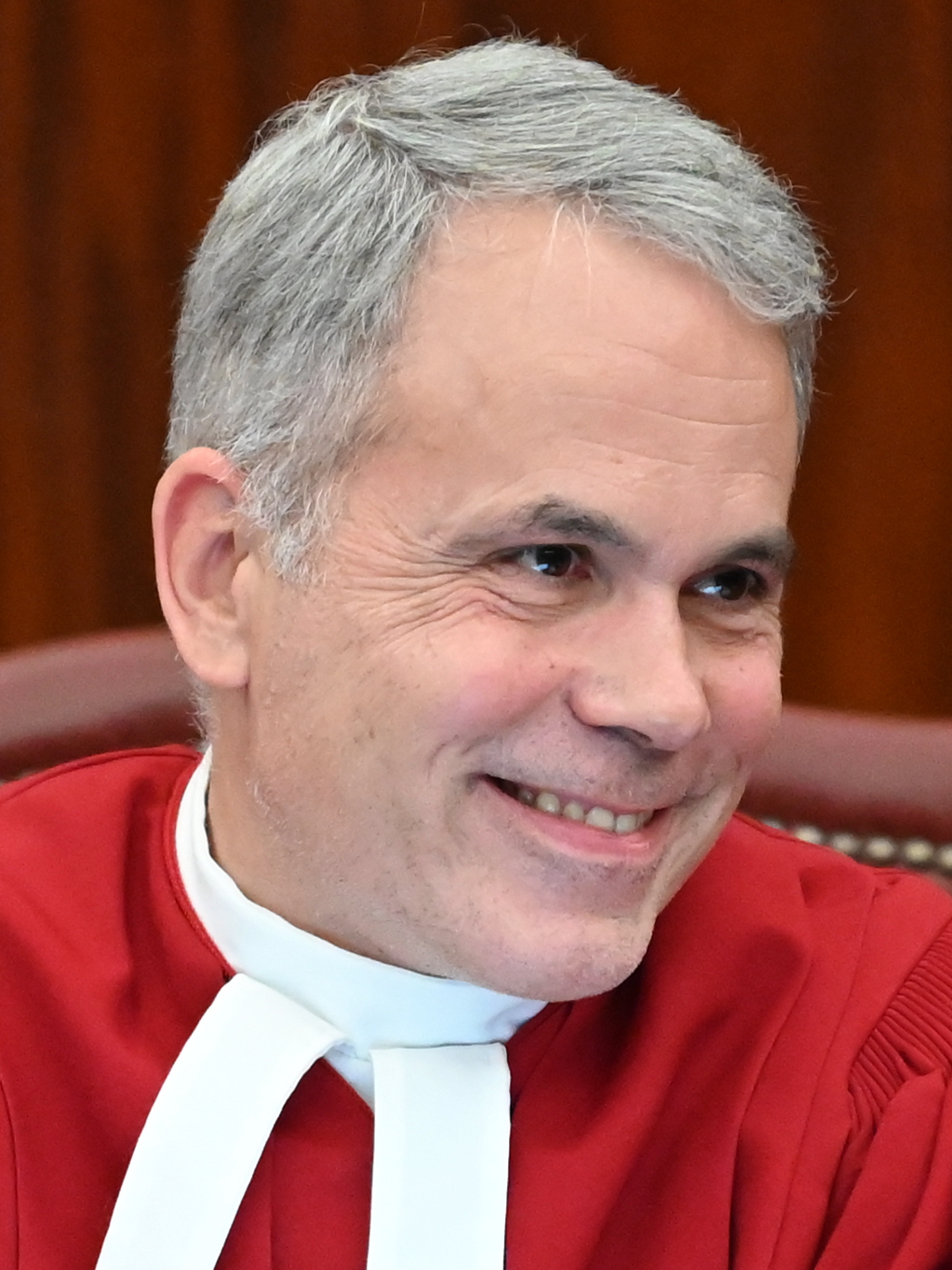
Chief Justice Matthew Fader delivered the opinion of the Court.

Prince George's County Circuit Court Judge Robin D. Gill ruled that the Maryland Child Victims Act was constitutional on March 6, 2024. On April 1, 2024, Montgomery County Circuit Court Judge Jeannie E. Cho ruled that the law was unconstitutional, finding that it violated the Maryland Declaration of Rights; the ruling was appealed to the Maryland Supreme Court, who agreed to hear the case on May 7, 2024, later setting arguments for September 10, 2024. On February 3, 2025, the Court issued a decision that, by a vote of 4–3, upheld the Child Victims Act. Chief Justice Matthew J. Fader wrote the majority opinion, holding that the 2017 law was "an ordinary statute of limitations, not a statue of repose" and was superseded by the Child Victims Act.

In mid-2025, there was a temporary stay on Child Victims Act cases in Baltimore City Circuit Court. In October 2025, after about a five-month pause, those cases resumed.

In July 2026, the Maryland Supreme Court agreed to hear the state's challenge to the Child Victims Act in case involving alleged hundreds of sexual abuse lawsuits. In its challenge, the state argued that it had absolute sovereign immunity to any civil lawsuit stemming from allegations of child sexual abuse that occurred before the enactment of the Maryland Tort Claims Act on July 1, 1982, and that the Child Victims Act did not lift this immunity.

=== Archdiocese of Baltimore bankruptcy ===
The Archdiocese of Baltimore filed for Chapter 11 bankruptcy on September 29, 2023, citing the Child Victims Act and the "great number of lawsuits" that were expected to be filed against the archdiocese after the bill went into effect on October 1. The bankruptcy filing was protested by church abuse victims, as bankruptcy proceedings automatically stopped civil proceedings against the archdiocese until an agreement is reached between church representatives and plaintiffs' attorneys. Lawyers for the archdiocese said that parishes and schools would contribute funds to a larger settlement for sexual abuse survivors.

In December 2023, U.S. Bankruptcy Court Judge Michelle M. Harner ruled that child sexual abuse survivors could submit claims against the archdiocese in bankruptcy court. More than 700 claims were filed against the archdiocese ahead of the May 31, 2024 deadline. Archbishop William E. Lori attended bankruptcy hearings on May 20, 2024, to listen to victims testify about the sexual abuse committed by Catholic clergy.

=== Maryland state government ===
As of January 2025, about 3,500 lawsuits involving allegations of sexual abuse against state agencies have been filed against state agencies, mainly in the juvenile justice system. State analysts have warned that settling these cases could cost the state hundreds of millions, if not billions, of dollars.

C. T. Wilson, the sponsor of the Child Victims Act, told The Baltimore Banner that he would support putting additional guardrails on how much money abuse survivors could collect from the state, saying that the law "wasn't about the money" but rather "giving victims the opportunity to approach their abusers". After the Supreme Court of Maryland ruled that the Child Victims Act was constitutional, Senate President Bill Ferguson and Senate Judicial Proceedings Committee chair William C. Smith Jr. said that lawmakers would consider legislation that would close the lookback window for filing child sexual abuse lawsuits after a certain date. In February 2025, Wilson introduced a bill that would reinstate the statute of limitations, but later said that he only agreed to the bill after having read its title and would be rewriting the bill to establish a survivors' fund. The bill was rewritten to lower the amount of money survivors could win in court to $400,000 for public institutions and $700,000 for private institutions—which would only apply to claims filed after June 1, 2025—and clarifies that survivors are subject to the same liability limit even if they were abused multiple times. Supporters of the Child Victims Act opposed Wilson's new bill, saying that it was unconstitutional or would wrongly hurt sexual abuse victims. The Maryland Attorney General's Office wrote to Wilson to advise that the proposed changes would likely face court challenges, but were "not clearly unconstitutional" and could be defended in court. The bill passed the Maryland General Assembly in April 2025, and was signed into law by Governor Wes Moore later that month.

== Legislative progress ==
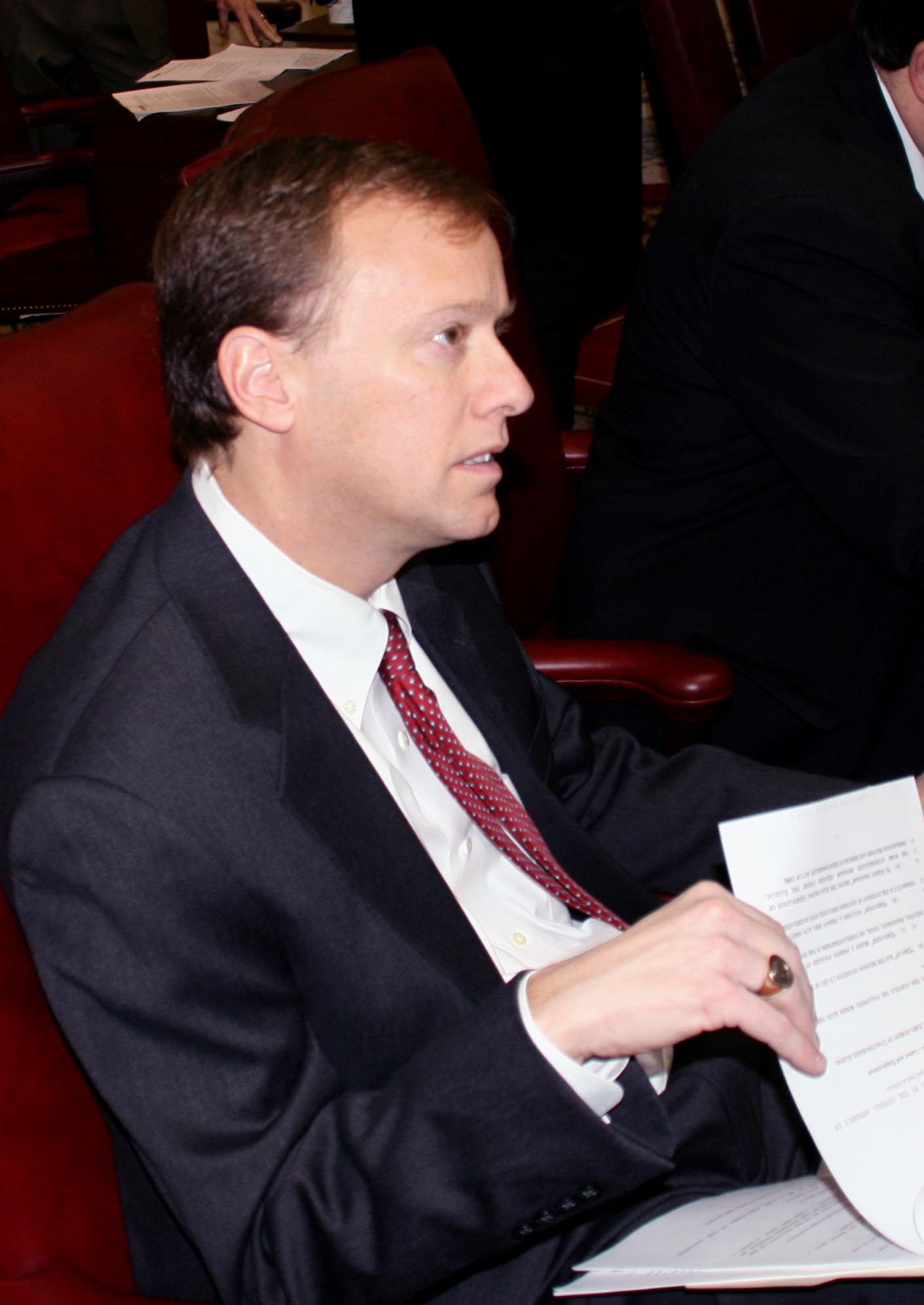
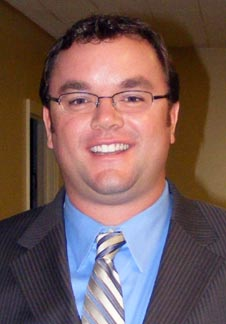
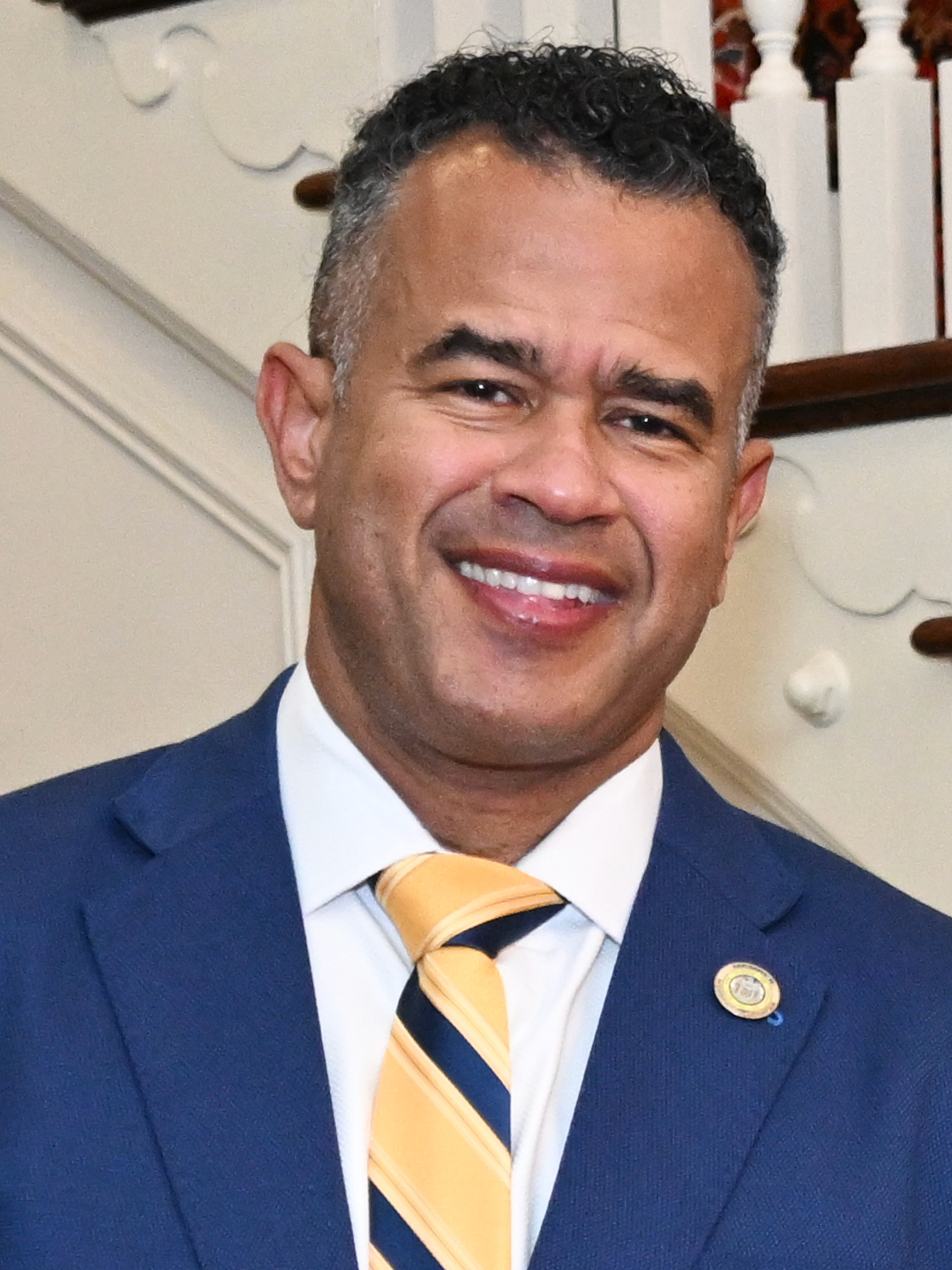
Iterations of the Child Victims Act were introduced by James Brochin, Eric Bromwell, and C. T. Wilson.

=== 423rd session (2007) ===
The 2007 bill was introduced by state senator James Brochin of Baltimore County on February 2, 2008. It was rejected by the Senate Judicial Proceedings Committee amid lobbying from the Maryland Catholic Conference.

=== 425th session (2008) ===
The 2008 bill was introduced by state delegate Eric M. Bromwell of Baltimore County on February 6, 2008. Bromwell faced pushback from his alma mater, Calvert Hall College High School, whose president wrote school supporters that the bill could cause a "severe, perhaps fatal, decline in enrollment" by allowing for lawsuits against the school by former students who allege that they had been molested by two former priests who had taught at the school and had sexually harassed at least 14 victims, which led opponents, including Bromwell's grandmother, to overwhelm Bromwell's office with calls in opposition of the bill that caused Bromwell to withdraw the bill.

=== 435th session (2015) ===
The 2015 bill was introduced by state delegate C. T. Wilson of Charles County on February 26, 2015. It was referred to the House Rules and Executive Nominations Committee, but never received a hearing. During hearings on a similar bill introduced by state delegate Aruna Miller that would extend the statute of limitations on child sexual abuse lawsuits, Wilson testified to lawmakers about how he had been repeatedly raped and beaten by his adoptive father between ages 9 and 15, but never brought charges against his father and said that he had not realized he was a victim until he was 40 years old.

=== 436th session (2016) ===
The 2016 bill was introduced by state senator Ronald N. Young of Frederick County on December 16, 2015, and by delegate Wilson on February 11, 2016. The bill did not advance out of the Judiciary Committee in either chamber following lobbying from the Maryland Catholic Conference.

=== 437th session (2017) ===
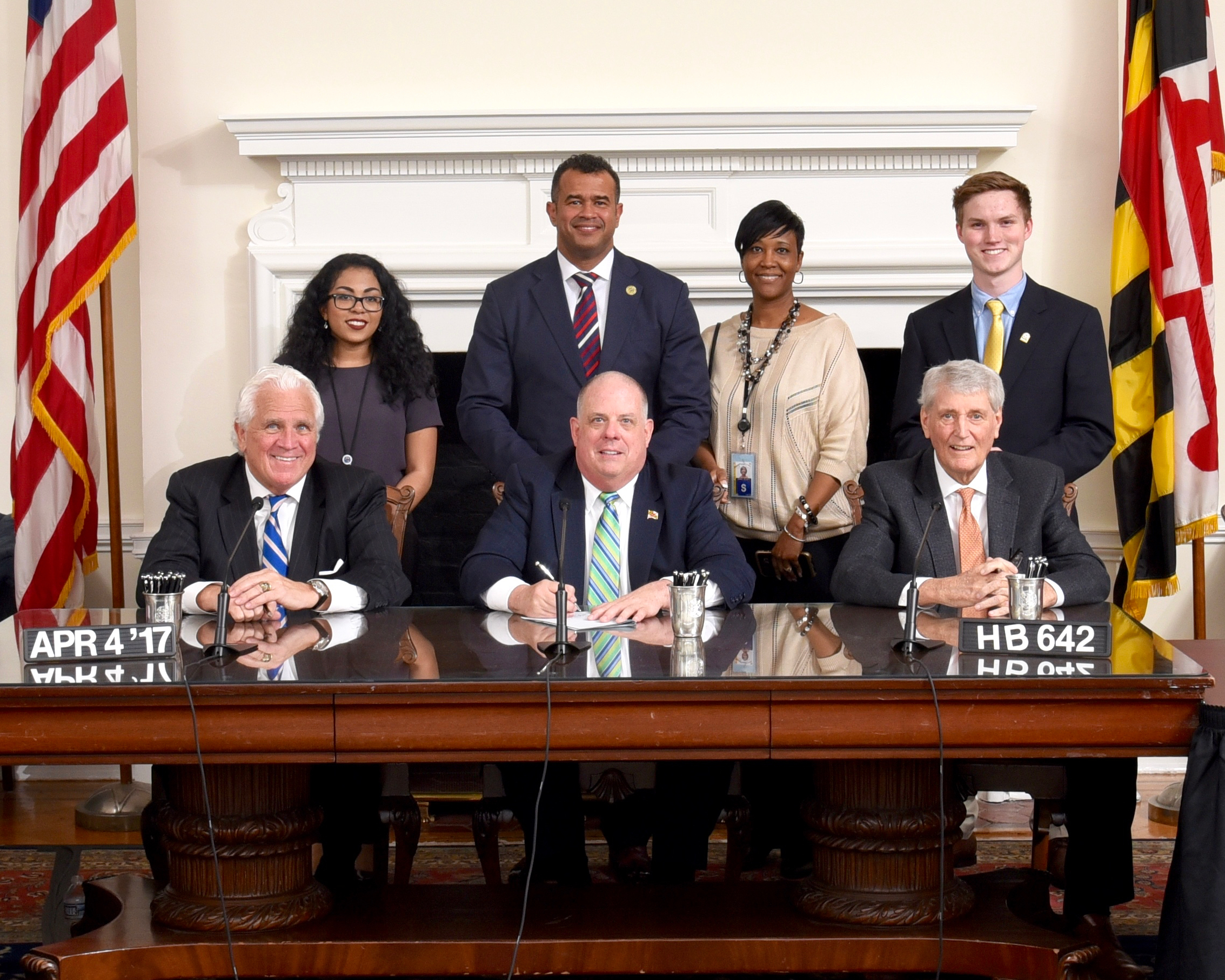
Governor Hogan signs House Bill 642 into law at the Government House on April 4, 2017

The 2017 bill was introduced by Wilson on February 1, 2017. Following negotiations with the Maryland Catholic Conference and Judiciary Committee chair Joseph F. Vallario Jr., the bill was amended to extend the statute of limitations for child sexual abuse lawsuits until the victim turns 38 years old, but would make it more difficult for victims over 25 years old to win damages in civil lawsuits by requiring victims to prove negligence. The amended bill unanimously passed both chambers and was signed into law by Governor Larry Hogan on April 4, 2017.

The amended bill also included a statute of repose provision that forbade the state from raising the maximum age above 38. The provision was not intended to be a part of the bill and was not noticed until 2019, when state delegate Kathleen Dumais cited it while introducing an amendment to repeal the look back window provision from the Hidden Predator Act of 2019. It is not known who added the statute of repose provision to the bill, but Wilson attributes it to John Stierhoff, a Venable LLP lawyer who worked as a lobbyist for the Maryland Catholic Conference and was involved with negotiations on the amended bill. Dumais' amendment would spark a debate among legislators on whether it would be constitutional to repeal the statute of repose.

=== 439th session (2019) ===
The 2019 bill, named the "Hidden Predator Act", was introduced by Wilson on February 7, 2019. The bill would have repealed the statute of limitations and created a two-year look-back window for child sexual abuse victims who were unable to sue because of the statute of limitations.

The bill passed the Maryland House of Delegates by a vote of 135–3 on March 18, 2019. The bill then moved to the Senate Judiciary Committee, where it faced bipartisan opposition from senators, including Michael Hough and Jill P. Carter; the bill died in the Judiciary Committee after receiving a deadlocked 5–5 vote to advance it. Shortly after this, the House Judiciary Committee amended Republican state senator Justin Ready's "Laura and Reid's Law" to extend the statute of limitations for child sexual abuse lawsuits until the victim turns 58 years old; however, this amendment was removed by conference committee before the bill was signed into law by Governor Larry Hogan. In February 2023, Maryland Attorney General Anthony Brown wrote in an advice letter that the Maryland General Assembly could amend the state's statute of repose to make exceptions for sexual abuse cases as the legislature had previously done for asbestos cases.

=== 441st session (2020) ===
The 2020 bill, again named the "Hidden Predator Act", was introduced by Wilson on February 5, 2020. The bill unanimously passed the House of Delegates, but never received a hearing in the Senate as the 2020 legislative session was cut short due to the COVID-19 pandemic.

=== 442nd session (2021) ===
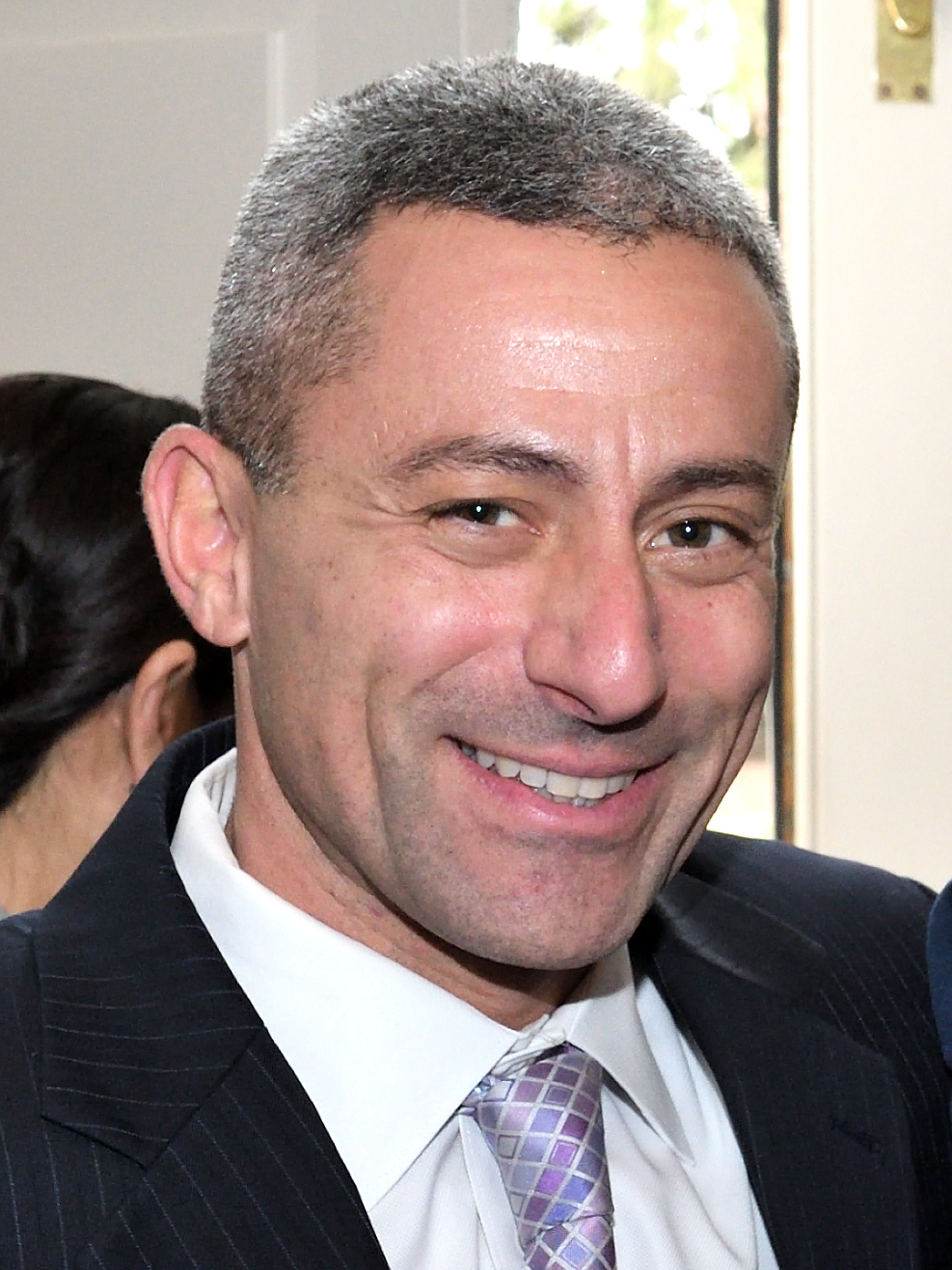
Former state senator Robert Zirkin notably testified against the 2021 bill.

The 2021 bill was introduced by delegate Wilson and state senator Shelly Hettleman of Baltimore County on September 30, 2020. During the hearing on the bill in February 2021, former Senate Judicial Proceedings chair Robert Zirkin (who had resigned before the start of the 2021 legislative session and soon after became a lobbyist for the Maryland Catholic Conference) testified against the bill, saying that Wilson and fellow negotiators made a deal with the Catholic Church to prevent legislators from further adjusting the statute of limitations on child sex abuse cases in Maryland, which prompted the bill's opponents in the legislature to criticize Wilson and question his integrity. Wilson withdrew the bill on March 16, 2021, saying that he believed removing his name from the bill would give it a better chance of passing that year.

=== 445th session (2023) ===
The 2023 bill was introduced by Wilson on November 16, 2022, and by state senator William C. Smith Jr. of Montgomery County on February 6, 2023. Although the Maryland Catholic Conference announced that it would support legislation to eliminate the statute of limitation on future cases of child sexual abuse, the lobbying organization said that it would continue to oppose bills providing a two-year "look back window" for survivors to file lawsuits alleging past abuse. The Child Victims Act contained such a provision and thus the organization was opposed to its passage. According to lobbying records analyzed by The Baltimore Sun, the Maryland Catholic Conference spent $209,939 lobbying against the Child Victims Act from November 2022 to early May 2023.

Advocates were more optimistic at the chances of the Child Victims Act becoming law this time around, as two of its biggest opponents—Robert Cassilly and Michael Hough—were no longer members of the Maryland General Assembly. The bill gained additional momentum from the Attorney General's report on child sexual abuse in the archdiocese, the Attorney General's Office changing its position on the constitutionality of the bill, and the 2021 appointment of Will Smith as the chair of the Senate Judicial Proceedings Committee. Maryland Governor Wes Moore endorsed the Child Victims Act on March 3, 2023.

==== House passage ====
The Child Victims Act was heard in the House Judicial Proceedings Committee on March 2, 2023, and advanced to the House floor in a unanimous vote on March 29. It was heard on the House floor the following day, during which no attempts were made to amend the bill. Although Republican state delegates continued to express concerns about the constitutionality of the bill, the House of Delegates voted 132–2 to pass the Child Victims Act on March 31, 2023, with William Valentine and William J. Wivell being the only delegates to vote against it.

==== Senate passage ====
Map of the vote Democratic yea (34) Republican yea (8) Republican nay (5)

On January 20, 2023, William C. Smith Jr. announced that the Senate Judicial Proceedings Committee review child sexual abuse laws in Maryland. The Judicial Proceedings Committee voted 10–1 to advance the bill to the Senate floor on March 10, with only Republican state senator Chris West voting against it. West led opposition against the bill, which he believed was unconstitutional and would be overturned by the Maryland Supreme Court. The bill was heard on the Senate floor on May 14, during which state senator Justin Ready introduced multiple amendments over concerns that state courts would exempt private companies, but not the state government, from paying settlements; all amendments were rejected in near party-line votes.

On March 17, 2023, the Maryland Senate voted 42–5 to pass the Child Victims Act. The House crossfile version of the bill received a 42–4 vote on April 7, 2023. Voting against the bill were West, Ready, Jack Bailey, Mary Beth Carozza, and Johnny Ray Salling.

=== Signing into law ===
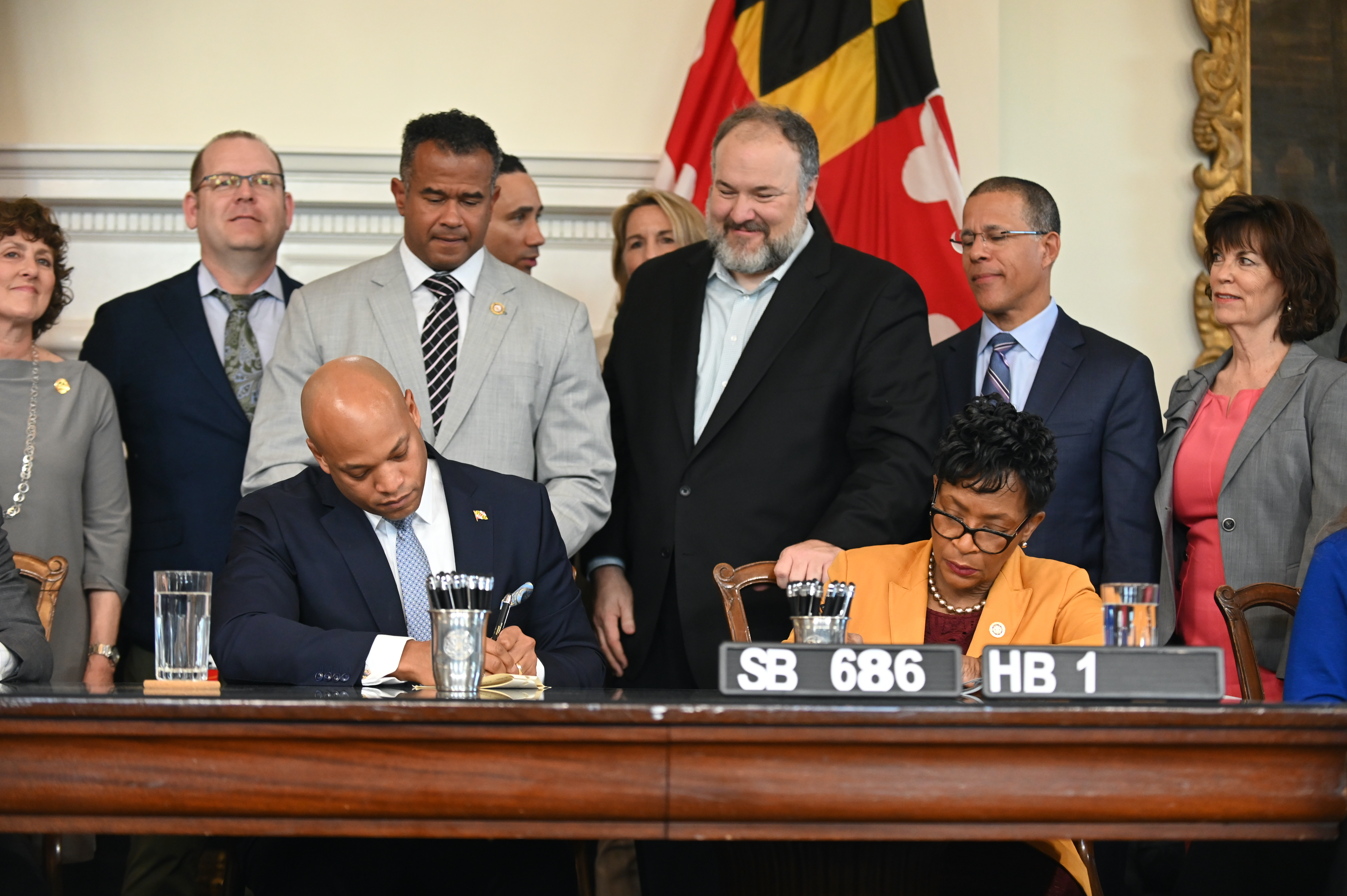
Governor Moore signing the bill into law at the Government House on April 11, 2023

On April 11, 2023, Governor Wes Moore signed the Child Victims Act into law in his first bill signing ceremony as governor. Wilson spoke at the event, where he thanked House Speaker Adrienne A. Jones and House Judicial Proceedings Committee chair Luke Clippinger for helping get the bill passed and adding that he "never thought God would let me see this moment."

== Legislative history ==
General Assembly	Short title	Bill number(s)	Date introduced	Sponsor(s)	# of cosponsors	Latest status
423rd session		SB 575	February 2, 2007	Sen. James Brochin (D-Baltimore County)	0	Rejected by Judicial Proceedings Committee
425th session		HB 858	February 6, 2008	Del. Eric Bromwell (D-Baltimore County)	5	Referred to Judiciary Committee; withdrawn by sponsor
435th session		HB 1214	February 26, 2015	Del. C. T. Wilson (D-Charles)	0	Referred to Rules and Executive Nominations Committee
435th session		HB 725	February 13, 2015	Del. Aruna Miller (D-Montgomery)	1	Referred to the Judiciary Committee
436th session		HB 1215	February 12, 2016	Del. C. T. Wilson (D-Charles)	0	Referred to the Judiciary Committee
436th session		SB 69	July 6, 2015	Sen. Ronald N. Young (D-Frederick)	0	Referred to the Judicial Proceedings Committee
437th session		HB 641	February 1, 2017	Del. C. T. Wilson (D-Charles)	17	Rejected by Judicial Proceedings Committee
437th session		HB 642	February 1, 2017	Del. C. T. Wilson (D-Charles)	6	Passed the House of Delegates (140–0); Passed the Senate (47–0); Signed into law by Governor Larry Hogan
437th session		SB 505	February 1, 2017	Sen. Delores G. Kelley (D-Baltimore County)	27	Passed the Senate (47–0); Passed the House of Delegates (139–0); Signed into law by Governor Larry Hogan
439th session	Hidden Predator Act of 2019	HB 687	February 7, 2019	Del. C. T. Wilson (D-Charles)	13	Passed the House of Delegates (135–3); Rejected by Senate Judicial Proceedings Committee
441st session	Hidden Predator Act of 2020	HB 974	February 5, 2020	Del. C. T. Wilson (D-Charles)	11	Passed the House of Delegates (127–0)
442nd session		HB 263	September 30, 2020	Del. C. T. Wilson (D-Charles)	0	Referred to the Judicial Proceedings Committee; withdrawn by sponsor
442nd session		SB 134	September 30, 2020	Sen. Shelly Hettleman (D-Baltimore County)	4	Referred to the Judicial Proceedings Committee
445th session	The Child Victims Act of 2023	HB 1	November 16, 2022	Del. C. T. Wilson (D-Charles)	16	Passed the House of Delegates (132–2); Passed the Senate (42–4); Signed into law by Governor Wes Moore
445th session	The Child Victims Act of 2023	SB 686	February 6, 2023	Sen. Will Smith (D-Montgomery)	0	Passed the Senate (42–5); Passed the House of Delegates (133–0); Signed into law by Governor Wes Moore
