= Debra Davis =

American politician (born 1959)

Debra M. Davis
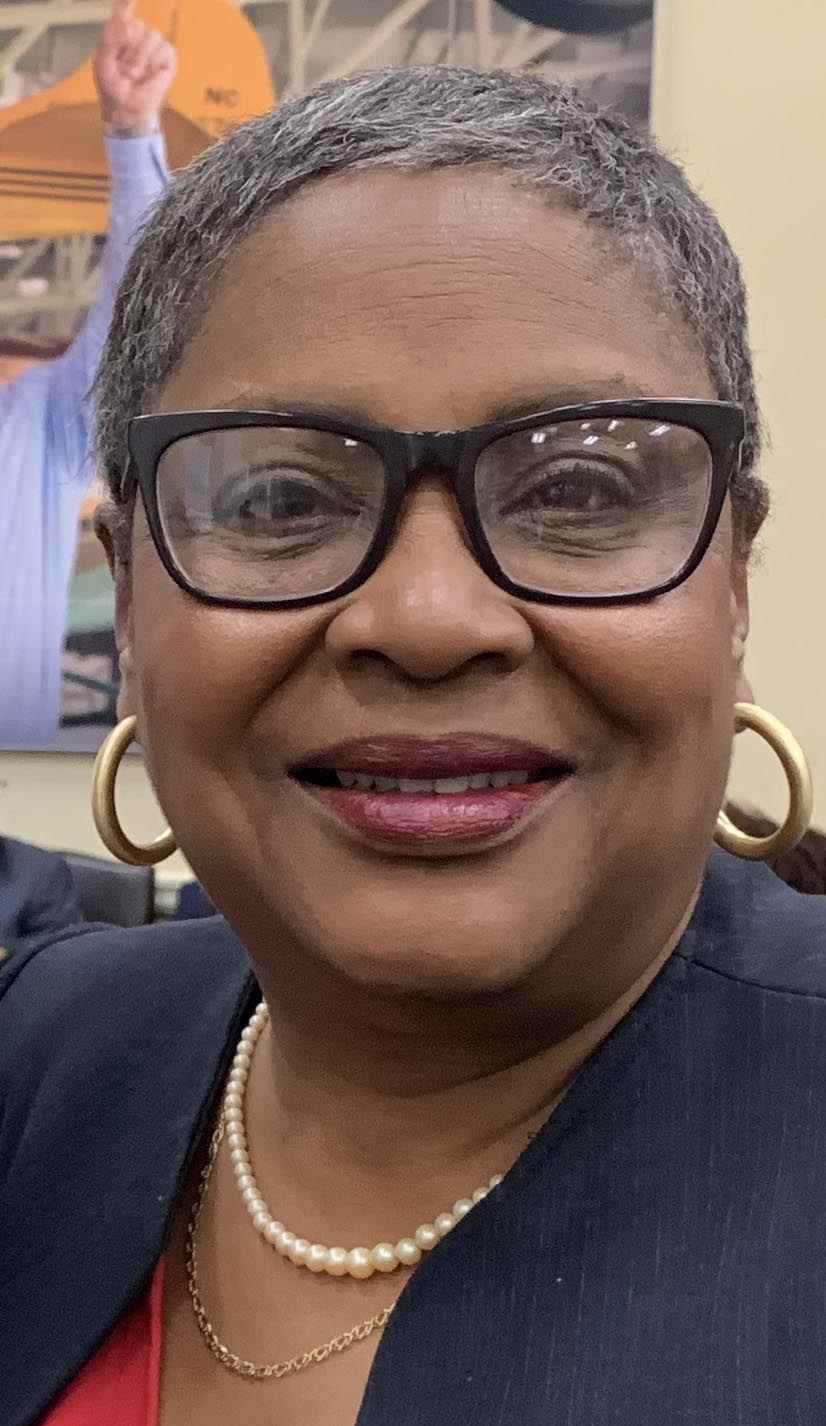

Member of the Maryland House of Delegates from the 28th district
- Incumbent
- Assumed office January 9, 2019 Serving with C. T. Wilson, Edith J. Patterson
- Preceded by: Sally Y. Jameson

Personal details
- Born: October 11, 1959 (age 67) Cheverly, Maryland, U.S.
- Party: Democratic
- Children: 2 daughters
- Occupation: Attorney

Debra M. Davis (born October 11, 1959) is an American politician who has served as a member of the Maryland House of Delegates representing District 28 since 2019. A member of the Democratic Party, she previously served as a member of the Charles County Board of Commissioners from 2010 to 2018.

== Background ==
Davis was born in Cheverly, Maryland, on October 11, 1959. She graduated from Frederick Douglass High School and later attended University of Maryland, College Park with a Bachelor of Science degree in criminology, and the University of Baltimore School of Law, where she earned a Juris Doctor degree. Davis was admitted to the Maryland Bar in 1995 and to the District of Columbia Bar in 1996.

In 2010, Davis was elected to the Charles County Board of Commissioners, representing the Charles County District 2. During her two terms as commissioner, she gained the reputation as a maverick, often voting against the majority on issues large and small. During her second term, she also served as the chair of the board of trustees for the Local Government Insurance Trust, becoming the first African-American to serve as LGIT Chair.

In January 2018, Davis announced that she would run for the Maryland House of Delegates in District 28. The district was targeted by the Republican State Leadership Committee in the general election, in which Davis placed third with 23.8 percent of the vote, behind incumbents C. T. Wilson and Edith J. Patterson.

== In the legislature ==
Davis was sworn in on January 9, 2019. She was a member of the Judiciary Committee from 2019 to 2022, and afterwards serving as a member of the Environment and Transportation Committee until December 2025, when she returned to the Judiciary Committee as its vice chair. She is also the House Chair of the Charles County Delegation and is a member of the Legislative Black Caucus of Maryland and the Women Legislators of Maryland.

== Political positions ==
=== Crime and policing ===
Davis supports the removal of school resource officers (SROs) from public schools, noting that SRO programs in Charles County disproportionally affected Black and brown students, and reforms to make policing more equitable and humane.

During the 2019 legislative session, Davis expressed concerns with a bill that would require judges' names to be included in all online records, worrying that the bill would have a "chilling effect" on judges' independence.

In 2020, Davis introduced legislation that would require prosecutors to submit additional information about jailhouse informants before they could testify in a court case to identify whether they have a conflict of interest in the case. She also supported efforts to repeal the Law Enforcement Officers' Bill of Rights.

During the 2021 legislative session, Davis introduced legislation that would establish a statewide police use of force policy. The bill died in committee without a vote. She also supported a bill that would require counties to have a citizen review board for law enforcement officers. She also supported a bill to remove the governor of Maryland from the state's parole board.

In 2023, Davis introduced a bill that would establish a division in the office of the Attorney General of Maryland to oversee the Maryland Department of Corrections. The bill passed the Maryland Senate, but died in the House Rules Committee.

=== Education ===
In August 2019, Davis criticized Charles County's "Fresh Start Academy" pilot program, which separates violently disruptive students in kindergarten through second grade into smaller environments, saying that the county school system should instead prioritize improving its ratio of counselors to students.

During the 2021 legislative session, Davis introduced legislation to would expand access to Supplemental Nutrition Assistance Program (SNAP) assistance to eligible college students. The bill passed and became law.

In 2022, Davis opposed legislation to break up the College of Southern Maryland to create a new Charles County Community College.

=== Environment ===
In June 2017, Davis voted against the creation of a Watershed Conservation District in northwest Charles County surrounding the Mattawoman Creek watershed.

=== Marijuana ===
In March 2016, Davis sought to postpone a bill to allow for the growth and dispensing of medical cannabis in Charles County, saying that she believed the county had not fully looked into the issue and wanted to get the Charles County Sheriff's Office involved in the discussion. She voted against the bill when it came up for a vote. During the 2022 legislative session, Davis voted against a bill creating a statewide referendum on legalizing recreational cannabis in Maryland, saying that she did not think the state is not ready for legalization.

=== Social issues ===
In January 2017, Davis attended the Women's March in Washington, D.C.

=== Transportation ===
During her tenure as county commissioner, Davis supported the Cross County Connector, a proposed four-lane highway connecting east and west Charles County.

During her 2018 House of Delegates campaign, Davis said she opposed a bus rapid transit system implemented by the Maryland Department of Transportation as an interim solution while the state studies potential light rail projects in southern Maryland. She supports the Southern Maryland Rapid Transit, a 19-mile rail project from Branch Avenue Metro station in Suitland-Silver Hill to White Plains, Maryland, calling it a "future driver of economic development". In 2021, Davis introduced legislation to provide $25 million toward design and engineering work for the proposed transit line, which passed and was signed by Governor Larry Hogan.

== Electoral history ==
Charles County Commissioner District 2 Democratic primary election, 2010
Party	Candidate	Votes	%
Democratic	Debra Davis	4,823	43.3
Democratic	Charles Carrington	2,714	24.4
Democratic	Johnnie DeGiorgi	2,093	18.8
Democratic	Bob Buehler	902	8.1
Democratic	Leo Bachi Eyombo	610	5.5

Charles County Commissioner District 2 election, 2010
Party	Candidate	Votes	%
Democratic	Debra Davis	25,091	55.6
Republican	Rick Campbell	20,011	44.4
Write-in		21	0.1

Charles County Commissioner District 2 election, 2014
Party	Candidate	Votes	%
Democratic	Debra Davis (incumbent)	23,484	51.6
Republican	Mike Bakir	18,082	39.7
Write-in		3,958	8.6

Maryland House of Delegates District 28 Democratic primary election, 2018
Party	Candidate	Votes	%
Democratic	Edith J. Patterson (incumbent)	10,346	27.4
Democratic	C. T. Wilson (incumbent)	10,053	26.6
Democratic	Debra Davis	8,725	23.1
Democratic	Edward Holland	4,561	12.1
Democratic	John Coller	4,043	10.7

Maryland House of Delegates District 28 election, 2018
Party	Candidate	Votes	%
Democratic	Debra Davis	34,236	23.8
Democratic	Edith J. Patterson (incumbent)	33,383	23.2
Democratic	C. T. Wilson (incumbent)	32,793	22.8
Republican	Jim Crawford	15,059	10.5
Republican	Dave Campbell	15,010	10.4
Republican	Maureen Janette Woodruff	13,318	9.3
Write-in		159	0.1

Maryland House of Delegates District 28 election, 2022
Party	Candidate	Votes	%
Democratic	Debra Davis (incumbent)	28,394	23.2
Democratic	C. T. Wilson (incumbent)	27,959	22.8
Democratic	Edith J. Patterson (incumbent)	27,792	22.7
Republican	James Ashburn	13,867	11.3
Republican	Marquita Bushrod	12,673	10.3
Republican	Tyrone R. Hall	11,697	9.6
Write-in		160	0.1
