= Southern Maryland Delegation =

Delegation in the Maryland General Assembly

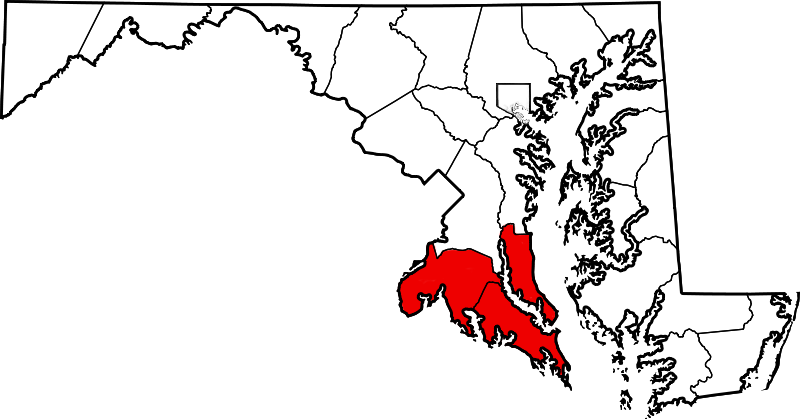

The Southern Maryland Delegation refers to the delegates who are elected from legislative districts in or shared by Calvert, Charles, Prince Georges or St. Mary's Counties to serve in the Maryland House of Delegates.

== Authority and responsibilities ==
The Delegation is responsible for representing the interests, needs and concerns of the citizens of Southern Maryland in the Maryland General Assembly.

== Members of the Southern Maryland Delegation ==
| District | Counties represented | Delegate | Party | First elected | Committee |
|---|---|---|---|---|---|
| 27A | Charles County, Prince George's | Kevin M. Harris | Democratic | 2022 | Children, Youth and Families |
| 27B | Calvert, Prince George's | Jeffrie E. Long Jr. | Democratic | 2022 | Environment and Transportation |
| 27C | Calvert | Mark N. Fisher | Republican | 2010 | Economic Matters |
| 28 | Charles | Debra Davis | Democratic | 2018 | Environment and Transportation |
| 28 | Charles | Edith J. Patterson | Democratic | 2014 | Ways & Means |
| 28 | Charles | C. T. Wilson | Democratic | 2010 | Economic Matters |
| 29A | St. Mary's | Matthew Morgan | Republican | 2014 | Health and Government Operations |
| 29B | St. Mary's | Brian M. Crosby | Democratic | 2018 | Economic Matters |
| 29C | Calvert, St. Mary's | Todd B. Morgan | Republican | 2022 | Environment and Transportation |
