= Murray D. Levy =

American politician (1944/1945–2024)

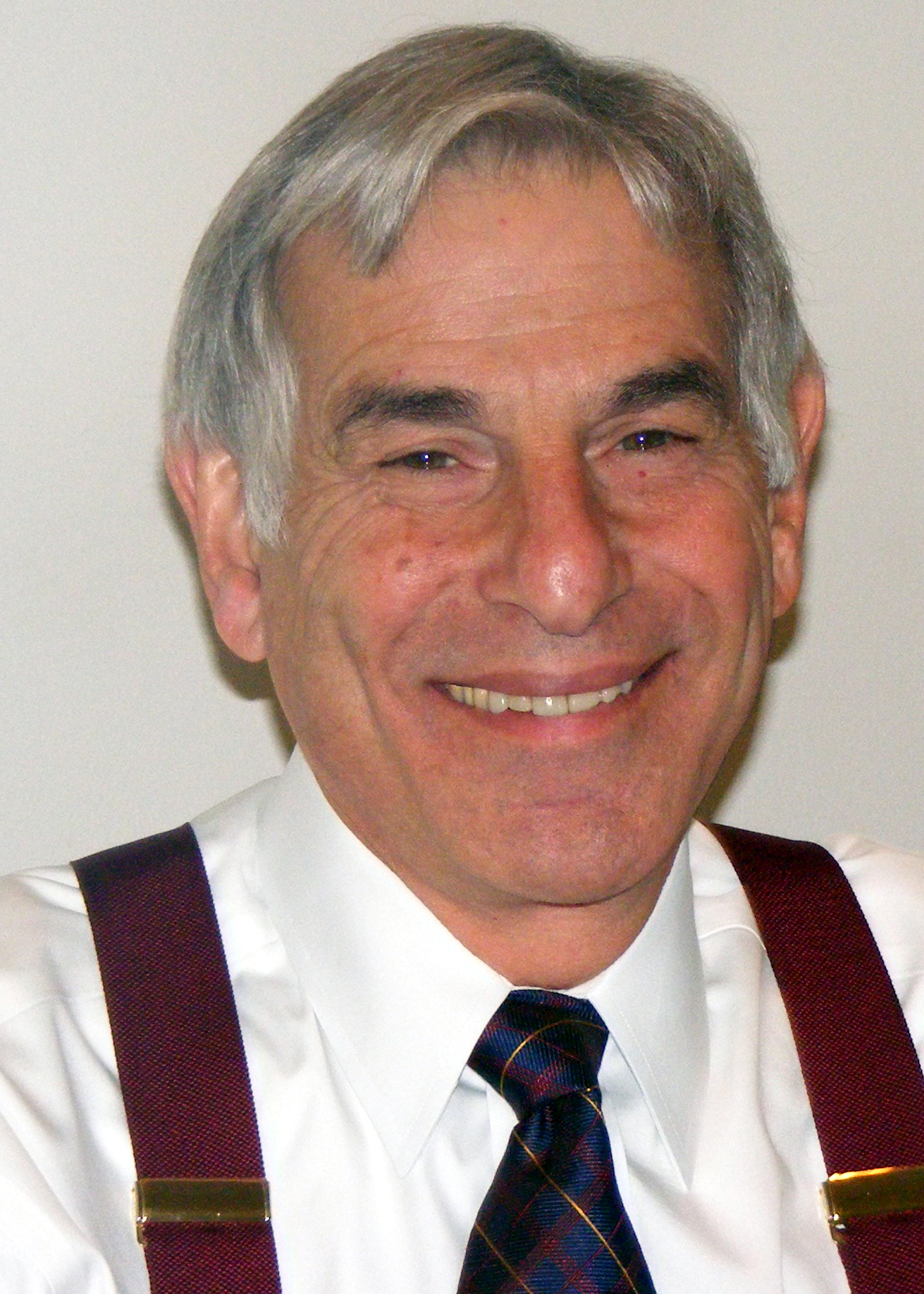
- Levy in 2007

Member of the Maryland House of Delegates from the 28th district
- In office October 28, 2004 – January 12, 2011
- Preceded by: Van Mitchell
- Succeeded by: C. T. Wilson
- Constituency: Charles County, Maryland

Personal details
- Born: 1944 or 1945
- Died: December 22, 2024 (aged 79) South Carolina, U.S.
- Party: Democratic

Murray David Levy (1944 or 1945 – December 22, 2024) was an American politician who represented district 28 in the Maryland House of Delegates for over six years, starting in October 2004. He did not run for reelection in 2010, the year he turned 65 years of age, and left office in January 2011. He held a BS in accounting from George Washington University.

== Background ==
Levy received a bachelor's degree (BS) in accounting from George Washington University, and served in the US Army from 1967 to 1969.

He was employed for many years by Charles County, Maryland, serving as director of finance from 1971 to 1976, and then as director of public works from 1976 to 1980.

In 1986, Levy was elected a member of the Charles County Commissioners, the county's legislative body, and continued serving through 2004, winning election as the body's president from 1996 until his departure.

Levy died in South Carolina on December 22, 2024, at the age of 79.

== In the Maryland legislature ==
Levy was appointed to the Maryland House of Delegates on October 28, 2004, serving as one of three delegates representing Maryland district 28, located in Charles County. He was 61 years of age when he ran in 2006 for a full four-year term as delegate, and 65 when he declined to run for reelection in 2010. In the November 2006 elections, he received 23,436 votes (23.9% of votes cast), the second highest total of the five candidates on the ballot, winning one of the three seats being contested.

While a delegate, he served on the Appropriations Committee from 2004 through 2011, including as vice chair of its Subcommittee on Transportation and Environment; the Special Joint Committee on Pensions starting in 2005; and starting in 2007 after his election to a full four-year term, he joined the Joint Committee on the Chesapeake and Atlantic Coastal Bays Critical Area, and the Joint Committee on the Management of Public Funds, serving on them all until his term ended in 2011.

== Post-legislative career ==
In November 2011, Levy took a part-time position with Alexander & Cleaver, a lobbying firm in the Maryland capital, Annapolis. He was hired "to focus on issues affecting Southern Maryland", where he is from.
