= Peter Murphy (Maryland politician) =

American politician

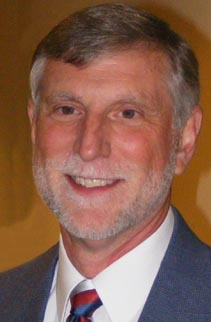

Member of the Maryland House of Delegates from the 28th district
- In office January 10, 2007 – November 30, 2014
- Preceded by: William Daniel Mayer

Personal details
- Born: July 15, 1949 (age 77) Washington, D.C.
- Party: Democratic Party
- Children: Mollie and Katie

Peter Murphy (born July 15, 1949) is an American politician and member of the Democratic Party who previously represented district 28 in the Maryland House of Delegates. In 2014, he was elected President of the Charles County Board of Commissioners.

== Background ==
Murphy was born in Washington, D.C., on July 15, 1949. He has both a B.A. and an M.A. from the American University, and an Ed.S. Degree in Counseling from George Washington University. He began his non-political career as a microbiologist for the National Institutes of Health. There he developed a strong interest in teaching and education and went on to teach science and math at General Smallwood Middle School in Indian Head, Maryland. He later directed a large educational testing program at George Washington University.

== In the legislature ==
Member of House of Delegates since January 10, 2007. Member, Ways and Means Committee, 2007- (education subcommittee, 2007-; transportation subcommittee, 2007-).

=== Legislative notes ===
- voted for the Clean Indoor Air Act of 2007 (HB359)
- voted in favor of increasing the sales tax by 20% - Tax Reform Act of 2007 (HB2)
- voted in favor of in-state tuition for illegal immigrants in 2007 (HB6)
- sponsored House Bill 30 in 2007, allowing the state to confiscate unused portions of gift certificates after 4 years.

== Personal ==
Murphy is openly gay. He was one of eight openly LGBT members of the Maryland General Assembly, alongside Sen. Rich Madaleno (D–Kensington) and Dels. Anne Kaiser (D–Burtonsville), Heather Mizeur (D–Takoma Park), Maggie McIntosh (D–Baltimore), Mary L. Washington (D–Baltimore), Bonnie Cullison (D–Silver Spring) and Luke Clippinger (D–Baltimore).

He is a divorced father of two daughters.
