= Maryland Legislative District 28 =

American legislative district

Maryland's legislative district 28
- Represents part of Charles County
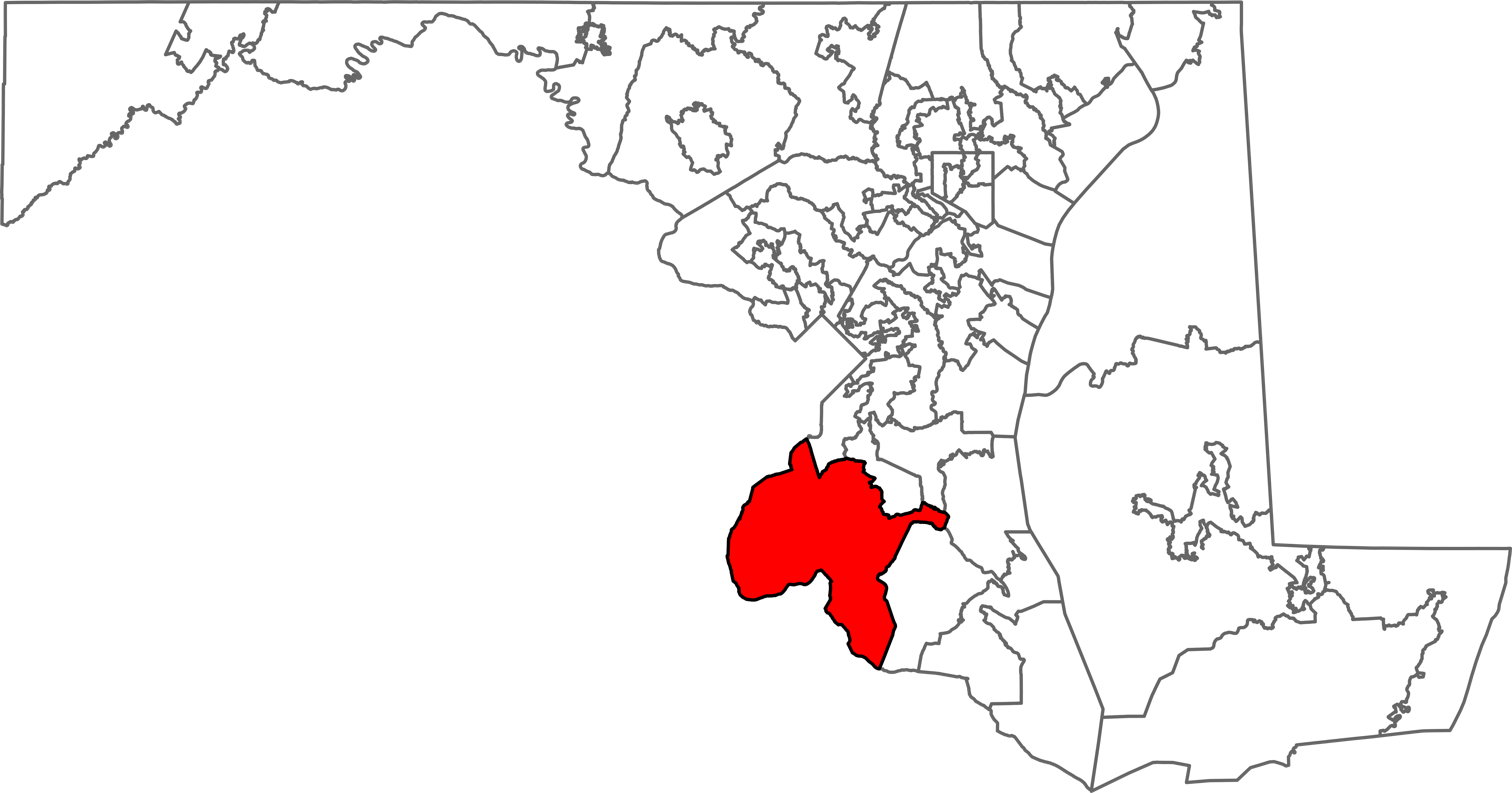
- Senator: Arthur Ellis (D)
- Delegate(s): Debra Davis (D); Edith J. Patterson (D); C. T. Wilson (D)
- Registration: 61.7% Democratic; 20.5% Republican; 16.7% unaffiliated
- Demographics: 34.6% White; 49.9% Black/African American; 0.7% Native American; 3.6% Asian; 0.0% Hawaiian/Pacific Islander; 3.1% Other race; 8.0% Two or more races; 6.8% Hispanic
- Population (2020): 147,401
- Voting-age population: 111,719
- Registered voters: 104,490

Maryland Legislative District 28 is one of 47 districts in the state for the Maryland General Assembly. It covers part of Charles County. The district is represented by three delegates in the Maryland House of Delegates.

== Demographic characteristics ==
As of the 2020 United States census, the district had a population of 147,401, of whom 111,719 (75.8%) were of voting age. The racial makeup of the district was 50,992 (34.6%) White, 73,618 (49.9%) African American, 1,072 (0.7%) Native American, 5,304 (3.6%) Asian, 69 (0.0%) Pacific Islander, 4,522 (3.1%) from some other race, and 11,747 (8.0%) from two or more races. Hispanic or Latino of any race were 10,006 (6.8%) of the population.

The district had 104,490 registered voters as of October 17, 2020, of whom 17,433 (16.7%) were registered as unaffiliated, 21,446 (20.5%) were registered as Republicans, 64,477 (61.7%) were registered as Democrats, and 644 (0.6%) were registered to other parties.

== Political representation ==
The district is represented for the 2023–2027 legislative term in the State Senate by Arthur Ellis (D) and in the House of Delegates by Debra Davis (D), Edith J. Patterson (D) and C. T. Wilson (D).

== History ==
Between 1983 and 1990, District 28 was divided into two subdistricts, 28A and 28B.

== Election history ==
Years	Senator	Party	Electoral history
January 8, 1975 – January 12, 1983	Thomas V. Miller Jr.	Democratic	Elected in 1974. Re-elected in 1978. Redistricted to the 27th district.
January 12, 1983 – January 11, 1995	James Simpson	Democratic	Redistricted from the 29th district and re-elected in 1982. Re-elected in 1986. Re-elected in 1990. Retired to run for lieutenant governor.
January 11, 1995 – January 9, 2019	Thomas M. Middleton	Democratic	Elected in 1994. Re-elected in 1998. Re-elected in 2002. Re-elected in 2006. Re-elected in 2010. Re-elected in 2014. Lost renomination.
January 9, 2019 – January 13, 2027	Arthur Ellis	Democratic	Elected in 2018. Re-elected in 2022. Retired to run for Congress.
January 13, 2027 – present	C. T. Wilson	Democratic	Elected in 2026.
