= Sally Y. Jameson =

American politician

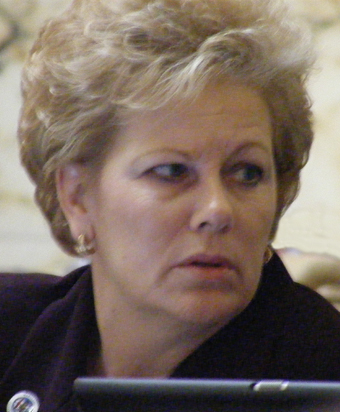

Member of the Maryland House of Delegates from District 28
- In office January 8, 2003 – January 10, 2019
- Preceded by: Samuel C. Linton
- Succeeded by: Debra Davis

Personal details
- Born: Prince Frederick, Maryland
- Party: Democratic
- Children: Two children, one grandchild

Sally Y. Jameson is a former American politician who represented district 28 in the Maryland House of Delegates and served as chairman of the Southern Maryland Delegation.

== Background ==
Sally Jameson was born Prince Frederick, Maryland. She attended Notre Dame High School, Bryantown, Maryland; St. Mary's Academy, Leonardtown, Maryland; Charles County Community College/College of Southern Maryland.

== In the legislature ==
Jameson was a member of the House Economic Matters Committee and its alcoholic beverages and its public utilities work groups. She also served on the committee's unemployment insurance subcommittee and was a member of the Joint Committee on Unemployment Insurance Oversight.

=== Legislative notes ===
- voted for the Clean Indoor Air Act of 2007 (HB359)
