= Trent Kittleman =

American politician (born 1945)

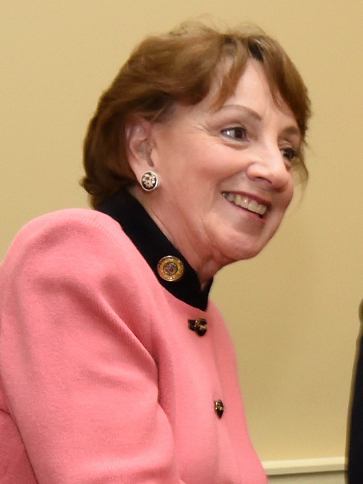
- Kittleman in 2017

Member of the Maryland House of Delegates from the 9A district
- In office January 14, 2015 – January 11, 2023 Serving with Warren E. Miller
- Preceded by: Gail H. Bates
- Succeeded by: Chao Wu

Personal details
- Born: May 7, 1945 (age 81) Baltimore, Maryland, U.S.
- Party: Republican
- Spouse: Robert H. Kittleman (m. 1986; died 2004)
- Children: 2
- Relatives: Allan H. Kittleman (stepson)
- Education: Catonsville Senior High School, Catonsville, Maryland
- Alma mater: Virginia Polytechnic Institute and State University (B.A.); University of North Carolina at Chapel Hill (M.A.); University of Maryland School of Law (J.D.)
- Profession: Attorney

Trent M. Kittleman (née Mitchell; born May 7, 1945) is an American politician who was a Republican member of the Maryland House of Delegates from 2015 to 2023. She was the wife of State Senator Robert H. Kittleman until his death in 2004, and unsuccessfully ran alongside him for County Council in 1978. She is the stepmother of Allan H. Kittleman, former state senator and Howard County executive.

After losing re-election to the Maryland House of Delegates in 2022, Kittleman aligned herself with the Howard County chapter of Moms for Liberty and ran for the Howard County Board of Education, losing to Andrea Chamblee in the general election on November 5, 2024.

Kittleman is the author of Why Must There Be Dragons? Empowering Women to Master Their Careers Without Changing Men.

== Early life and education ==
Kittleman was born on May 7, 1945, in Baltimore, Maryland. She graduated from Catonsville Senior High School in Catonsville, Maryland and attended the Virginia Polytechnic Institute and State University in Blacksburg, Virginia, where she earned a B.A. degree in English in 1967. She also attended the University of North Carolina at Chapel Hill, where she earned a M.A. in English literature in 1970, the University of Maryland School of Law, where she earned a J.D. degree in 1991, and Georgetown University in Washington, D.C., where she earned an executive leadership coaching certificate in 2010.

== Career ==
=== Attorney ===
After she was admitted to the Maryland Bar in 1991 – and later being admitted to the District of Columbia Bar in 1993 – she began working as an attorney for Arent Fox until 1996. In 1992, she became a member of the University of Maryland School of Law Alumni Association and served as its president from 2002 until her departure in 2003. After working for Arent Fox, she worked as a senior counsel for Marriott International until 1999, when she became the vice president of legislative affairs for Marriott. In 2001, she worked as a minority counsel for U.S. Senator Fred Thompson of Tennessee. In 2007, Kittleman, Marie Royce, and Joan Athen formed a company called GenderStrategy.

=== Author ===
In 2008, Kittleman's book, with contributing edits from Joan Athen and Marie Royce, Why Must There Be Dragons? Empowering Women to Master Their Careers Without Changing Men was published. The story takes place at Feline Foods and highlights a conflict between the dogs that run the company and the cats that work there, who are threatening a lawsuit for not getting promoted, a practice they call "discatination". Feline Foods CEO Bernie Rottweiler then hires Kathryn Woo, a training specialist, to identify the problem and fix it for the cats by working with Ryan "Wolfe" Wolfhound, the executive vice president of Special Projects and Bernie's right-hand man. The book is divided into three sections, each representing the early, middle, and peak years of one's career.

== Political career ==
Kittleman first got involved with politics by working as a coordinator for the Catonsville Republican Headquarters in 1968. In 1972, she became the co-chair of the Howard County Republican Election Headquarters, and in 1973 she became the president of the Howard County Republican Women's Club. She worked as a political columnist for Howard County Times from 1975 to 1976, after which she was elected to the Oakland Mills Village Board. In 1978, she unsuccessfully ran for the Howard County Council in 1978 alongside her husband, Robert Kittleman. From 1982 to 1986, she served as the chair of Robert Kittleman's and Robert Flanagan's election committees, and later co-chaired the Maryland Republican Party legislative candidate recruitment effort in 1988. In 1998, Kittleman worked on the gubernatorial campaign of Ellen Sauerbrey.

In January 2003, Governor Bob Ehrlich appointed Kittleman to serve as Deputy Secretary for the Maryland Department of Transportation, where she worked until October 2004, after which she served as Executive Secretary of the Maryland Transportation Authority until her resignation on January 22, 2007. During her service, the authority experienced a 450 percent increase in its capital program, including new lanes planned for Interstate 95, financing the Inter-county Connector in Montgomery County, and planning for toll-road bridge renovations.

Following the death of her husband in September 2004, Kittleman declined to serve the rest of his term in the Maryland Senate, saying that she was not able to focus on politics.

In October 2009, Kittleman said that she was "exploring" a run for Howard County Executive. She announced her candidacy for executive in February 2010. She ran unchallenged in the Republican primary, but was defeated by Ken Ulman in general election with 37.1 percent of the vote.

Since 2010, Kittleman has been a member of various women's groups, including the Business Women's Network, the American Association of University Women, and the League of Women Voters.

In 2012, Kittleman filed to run for delegate for the Republican National Convention, representing Newt Gingrich. She received 6.2 percent of the vote in the primary election.

In July 2013, Kittleman announced her candidacy for the Maryland House of Delegates in District 9A, the seat once held by her late husband for 19 years. She won the Republican primary with 22.4 percent of the vote, coming in second place in a field of five candidates. She defeated Democratic candidates Walter E. Carson and James Ward Marrow in the general election, receiving 37.5 percent of the vote.

== In the legislature ==
Kittleman was sworn into the Maryland House of Delegates on January 14, 2015. In 2022, she was defeated in the general election by Democrats Natalie Ziegler and Chao Wu.

=== Committee assignments ===
- Deputy Minority Whip, 2022–2023
- Member, Appropriations Committee, 2019–2023 (education & economic development subcommittee, 2019; oversight committee on pensions, 2019; transportation & the environment subcommittee, 2020–2023; oversight committee on personnel, 2020–2023)
- Joint Audit and Evaluation Committee, 2021–2023
- Member, Judiciary Committee, 2015–2018 (civil law & procedure subcommittee, 2015–2018)

=== Other memberships ===
- Member, Maryland Legislative Sportsmen's Caucus, 2015–2023
- Maryland Veterans Caucus, 2016–2023
- Maryland Legislative Transit Caucus, 2019–2023
- President, Women Legislators of Maryland, 2019–2020 (member, 2015–2023; treasurer, 2016–2017; 1st vice-president, 2017–2018; president-elect, 2018–2019)

== Post-legislative career ==
Following her defeat in the 2022 elections, Kittleman filed to run in 2024 for the Howard County Board of Education in District 5. Prior to her campaign announcement Kittleman was associated with the Howard County chapter of Moms for Liberty, but had taken herself off of the group's member rolls when she decided to run. Despite this distancing, Kittleman still promoted several of the group's positions in her school board campaign, including book banning, and included an advertisement for the group on her personal website. Kittleman was defeated by Andrea Chamblee in the general election on November 5, 2024 by more than 5%, 52.5% to 47%.

== Political positions ==
=== Crime ===
Kittleman introduced "Laura and Reid's Law" during the 2019 legislative session, which would allow prosecutors to seek convictions for the murders of the mother and fetus. The bill was named for Laura Wallen, who was four months pregnant when she was killed by her boyfriend in September 2017. The bill passed and became law on May 13, 2019.

=== Education ===
In 2015, Kittleman co-sponsored legislation that would shift the burden of proof in due process hearings for children with disabilities to get IEPs from parents to school systems.

=== Environment ===
In 2019, Kittleman voted against legislation that would allow the Howard County Council to set a fee for plastic bags. The bill passed and became law, and the Howard County Council voted 4-1 to implement the bag fee in December 2019.

In December 2019, the Maryland Public Interest Research Group gave Kittleman a score of zero percent on its annual legislative scorecard.

=== Guns ===
Since 2013, Kittleman has been a member of the National Rifle Association.

In 2017, Kittleman co-sponsored legislation that would prevent a person from owning firearms if they received probation before judgment for a crime of violence or a crime that is domestically-related. The bill passed and became law on May 27, 2017. She also co-sponsored legislation that would allow select employees to carry firearms on school property to prevent the loss of life in a school shooting, and another that would give property owners the right to use any amount of force to protect their residence from an intruder.

=== National politics ===
Kittleman endorsed Donald Trump in the 2016 Republican Party presidential primaries, saying that he was "the one person who can put this country back on the right footing."

=== Social issues ===
Kittleman supported legislation introduced in the 2019 legislative session that would allow doctors to prescribe a lethal dose of medication to terminally ill patients who want to end their lives. The bill passed the House of Delegates by a vote of 74-66. The bill was re-introduced during the 2022 legislative session.

Kittleman opposed legislation introduced in the 2022 legislative session that would allow hate crime victims to bring civil action against the person who committed the act, arguing that the bill would allow people to be sued "for thoughts".

=== Taxes ===
Kittleman co-sponsored legislation introduced during the 2015 legislative session that would provide tax relief to seniors and individuals that are totally disabled. The bill received an unfavorable report from the Ways and Means Committee.

== Awards ==
- Maryland Woman of the Year, Women's Transportation Seminar, Inc., 2004
- Maryland's Top 100 Women, Daily Record, 2004
- Robert H. Kittleman Life Achievement Award, Howard County Republican Central Committee, 2010

== Electoral history ==
Howard County Executive Republican Primary Election, 2010
Party	Candidate	Votes	%
Republican	Trent Kittleman	12,301	100.0%

Howard County Executive General Election, 2010
Party	Candidate	Votes	%
Democratic	Ken Ulman	66,121	62.8%
Republican	Trent Kittleman	39,066	37.1%
N/A	Other Write-Ins	98	0.1%

Alternate Delegates to the Republican National Convention, District 7, 2012
Party	Candidate	Votes	%
Republican	Ann Miller (Romney)	9,387	17.9%
Republican	Dave Myers (Romney)	9,038	17.2%
Republican	Loretta H. Shields (Romney)	8,709	16.6%
Republican	Gloria B. Murphy (Santorum)	4,357	8.3%
Republican	Bryant J. Parker (Santorum)	4,159	7.9%
Republican	Frank C. Mirabile (Gingrich)	3,465	6.6%
Republican	Trent Kittleman (Gingrich)	3,250	6.2%
Republican	M. Justin Kinsey (Paul)	2,521	4.8%
Republican	Adrian Citroni (Paul)	2,427	4.6%
Republican	Chick Chickanis (Gingrich)	2,310	4.4%
Republican	Larry Manross, III (Paul)	2,259	4.3%
Republican	Kendall Taylor Murphy (Perry)	546	1.0%

Maryland House of Delegates District 9A Republican Primary Election, 2014
Party	Candidate	Votes	%
Republican	Warren E. Miller	3,354	29.2%
Republican	Trent Kittleman	24,371	22.4%
Republican	Frank Mirabile	2,509	21.8%
Republican	Kyle Lorton	1,620	14.1%
Republican	Christopher Eric Bouchat	1,426	12.4%

Maryland House of Delegates District 9A General Election, 2014
Party	Candidate	Votes	%
Republican	Trent Kittleman	24,371	37.5%
Republican	Warren E. Miller	21,553	33.1%
Democratic	Walter E. Carson	10,144	15.6%
Democratic	James Ward Morrow	8,906	13.7%
N/A	Other Write-Ins	99	0.2%

Maryland House of Delegates District 9A Republican Primary Election, 2018
Party	Candidate	Votes	%
Republican	Trent Kittleman	5,222	51.7%
Republican	Warren E. Miller	4,873	48.3%

Maryland House of Delegates District 9A General Election, 2018
Party	Candidate	Votes	%
Republican	Trent Kittleman	24,531	30.6%
Republican	Warren E. Miller	19,563	24.4%
Democratic	Natalie Ziegler	18,891	23.6%
Democratic	Steven M. Bolen	17,019	21.3%
N/A	Other Write-Ins	56	0.1%

Maryland House of Delegates District 9A General Election, 2022
Party	Candidate	Votes	%
Republican	Trent Kittleman	17,373	26.26%
Republican	Jianning Jenny Zeng	13,609	20.57%
Democratic	Chao Wu	17,486	26.43%
Democratic	Natalie Ziegler	17,656	26.68%
N/A	Other Write-Ins	44	0.07%
