= Katie Fry Hester =

American politician (born 1974)

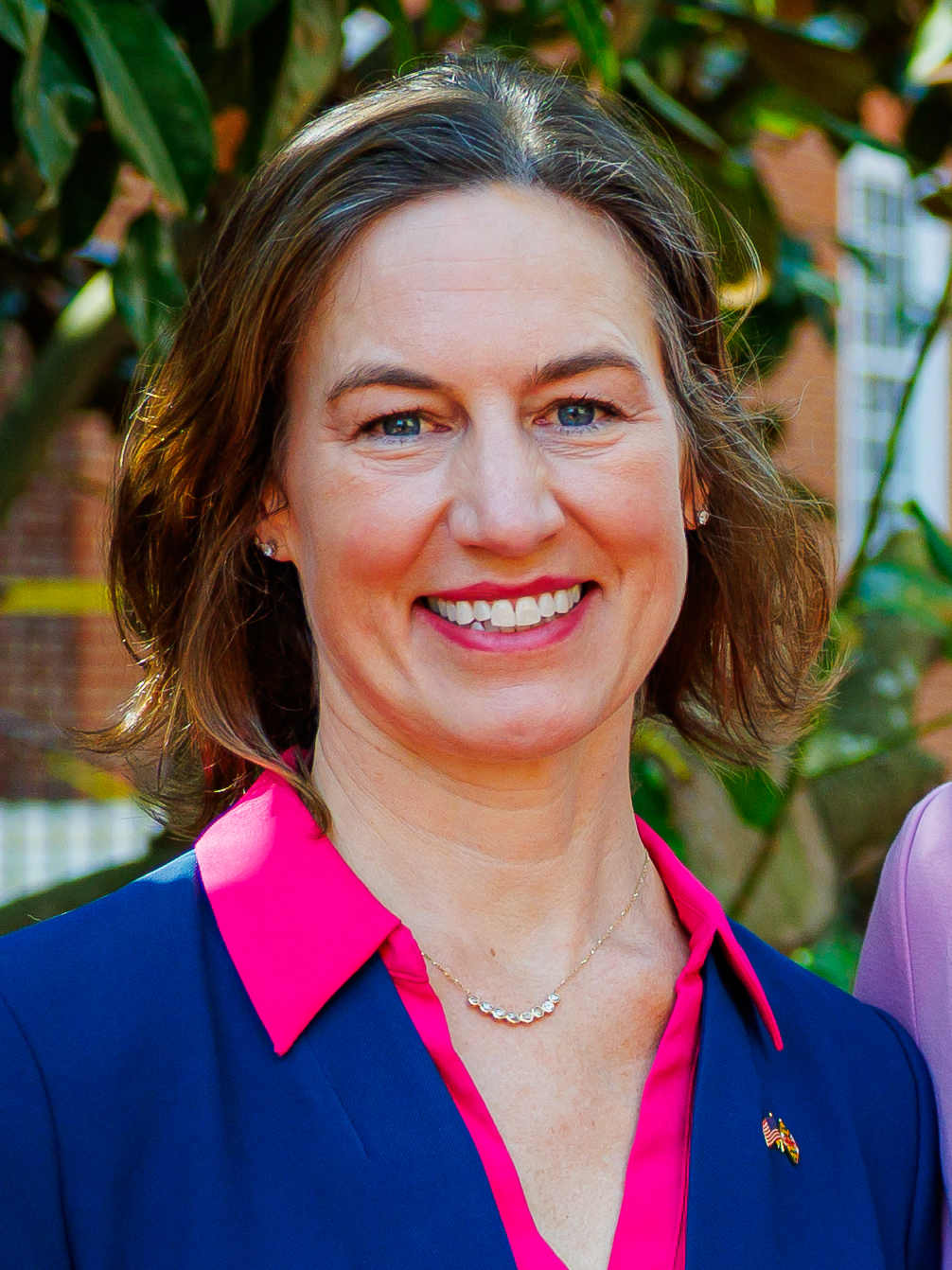
- Hester in 2025

Member of the Maryland Senate from the 9th district
- Incumbent
- Assumed office January 9, 2019
- Preceded by: Gail H. Bates

Personal details
- Born: Kathryn A. Fry; December 31, 1974 (age 51) New York City, New York, U.S.
- Party: Democratic
- Children: 2
- Education: Cornell University (B.Sc.)
- Website: https://katiefryhester.com/

Kathryn Fry Hester (born December 31, 1974) is an American politician who has served as a Democratic member of the Maryland Senate from the 9th District, based in Howard County and Montgomery County, since 2019.

== Early life and education ==
Hester was born in New York City on December 31, 1974. She attended Cornell University in 1997, earning a Bachelor of Science degree in agricultural and biological engineering. After graduating, she worked as a senior analyst at Arthur D. Little from 1998 to 2001 and as the manager of research and advocacy at SustainAbility from 2001 to 2009. She also is a Maryland first responder and volunteers for WISP Ski Patrol.

== Political career ==
=== Early political career ===
Hester got involved in politics following the 2016 presidential election out of concern that political divisiveness in Washington was spilling over into her community. Hester joined liberal groups like Indivisible and Do the Most Good and created a small group called Building Bridges with the aim of bringing civility back to her community. She attended the 2017 Women's March on Washington with her two daughters, Sierra and Alexa.

In August 2017, Hester announced that she would run for the Maryland Senate, challenging Republican incumbent Gail H. Bates. She campaigned on a platform that included expanding access to health care, increasing education funding, and "socially and environmentally responsible" job growth and development. Hester was uncontested in the Democratic primary, and Maryland Senate Democrats viewed the District 9 Senate election as a potential pickup opportunity given the national environment. Maryland Matters ranked her election among the eight most competitive elections in the Maryland General Assembly that year. She defeated Bates in the general election by 531 votes, and was the only Democrat to oust a Republican senator in Maryland in the 2018 Maryland Senate election.

=== Maryland Senate ===
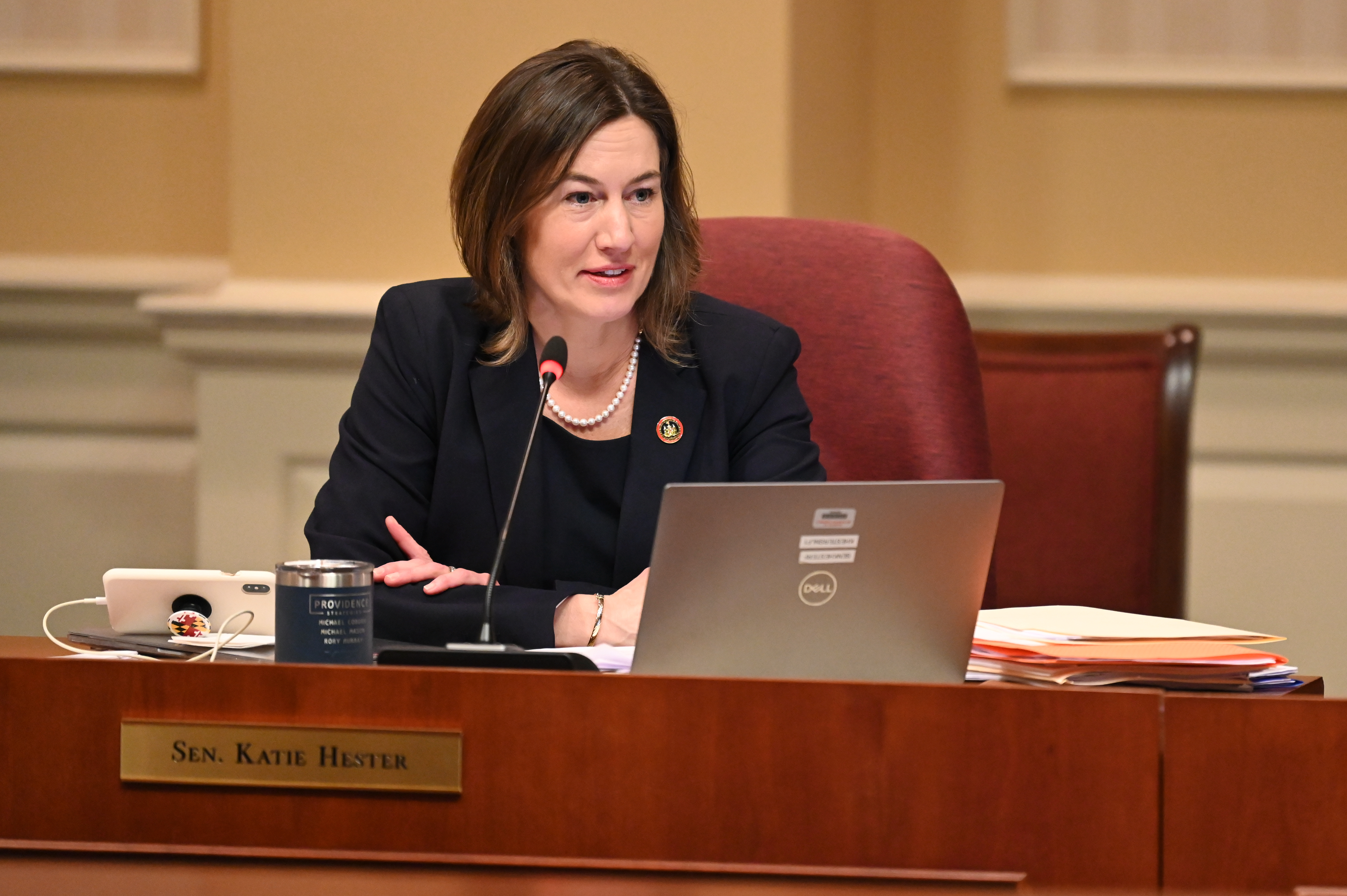
Hester in the Senate Education, Energy, and the Environment Committee, 2024

Hester was sworn into the Maryland Senate on January 9, 2019. She is the first Democrat to represent District 9 in the Maryland Senate since Senator Charles Smelser in 1994. Hester has been as a member of the Education, Energy, and the Environment Committee and the Women Legislators of Maryland since 2019. She has also served on the Protocol Committee since 2020, and as the chair of the Senate Rules Committee since 2026. Since 2023, Hester has served as a deputy majority whip of the Maryland Senate.

== Political positions ==
Hester has described herself as a centrist and a moderate Democrat who yearns to find common ground with Republicans.

=== Artificial intelligence ===
During the 2026 legislative session, Hester introduced bills to ban the use of deepfakes to spread misinformation about elections, to criminalize the use of deepfakes to impersonate someone or cause serious harm, and to prohibit minors from being able to access chatbots unless its developers implement policies to prevent the encouragement of self-harm, harming others, or suicide.

=== Environment ===
In March 2019, Hester worried that a bill banning the use of plastic foam food containers in Maryland would hurt farmers, including those in her district. After the bill passed the legislature passed the Maryland Senate, she proposed passing legislation to help egg farmers transition to different kinds of materials, appealing to a compromise offered by Republican senator Jack Bailey.

In 2020, Hester worked alongside state delegate Courtney Watson to secure $8.25 million dollars in funding from the state to support Howard County executive Calvin Ball III's Safe & Sound Plan, a multi-phase proposal to advance flood mitigation projects and support local business and property owners in Ellicott City, Maryland.

In November 2025, Hester proposed a plan that would provide data centers with incentives to bring their own power generation to the grid and extend a cap on an PJM Interconnection auction that partially drives consumer prices.

=== Israel ===
In November 2023, Hester and eight other state senators signed a joint letter that threatened to defund immigrants rights group CASA de Maryland because it had called for an immediate ceasefire in the Gaza war and condemned the "utilization of US tax dollars to promote the ongoing violence."

=== Minimum wage ===
In March 2019, when the Maryland General Assembly was deciding whether to override Governor Larry Hogan's veto of a $15 minimum wage bill, Hester was tempted to vote against the minimum wage veto override, joining Republican senators who said a $15 wage would lead to job losses and hurt places in her district. She ultimately decided to vote to override the governor's veto on the bill, viewing it as a step toward economic equity, but she also supported GOP proposals to vary the minimum wage in different parts of the state and offered an amendment to give certain small businesses more time to pay the higher wage, both of which were rejected by Senate Democrats.

In April 2019, Hester convened a bipartisan workgroup consisting of Democratic senators Guy Guzzone and Brian Feldman and Republican senators Andrew Serafini, Christopher R. West, and Mary Beth Carozza to look at possible aid for small business owners in light of the $15 minimum wage veto override.

=== Redistricting ===
During her 2018 state senate campaign, Hester said she supported using an independent redistricting commission to draw Maryland's congressional and legislative districts.

== Electoral history ==
Maryland Senate District 9 Democratic primary election, 2018
Party	Candidate	Votes	%
Democratic	Katie Fry Hester	9,761	100.0

Maryland Senate District 9 election, 2018
Party	Candidate	Votes	%
Democratic	Katie Fry Hester	33,493	50.8
Republican	Gail H. Bates (incumbent)	32,347	49.1
Write-in		52	0.1

Maryland Senate District 9 election, 2022
Party	Candidate	Votes	%
Democratic	Katie Fry Hester (incumbent)	31,214	57.92
Republican	Reid Novotny	22,637	42.00
Write-in		42	0.08
Total votes		53,893	100.00
