= Allan H. Kittleman =

U.S. politician from Maryland

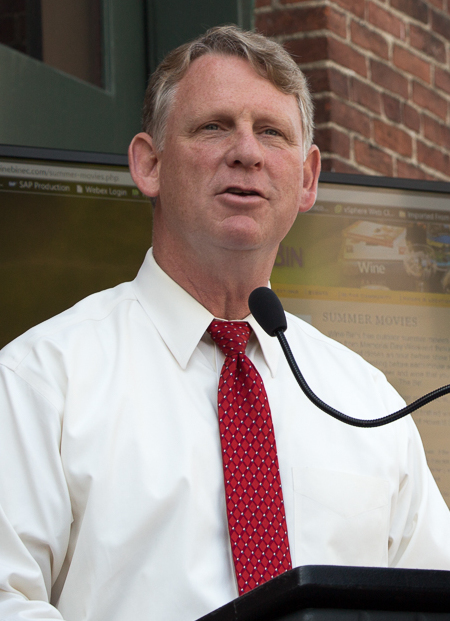

9th County Executive of Howard County
- In office December 1, 2014 – December 3, 2018
- Preceded by: Kenneth Ulman
- Succeeded by: Calvin Ball III

Minority Leader of the Maryland Senate
- In office September 16, 2008 – January 18, 2011
- Preceded by: David R. Brinkley
- Succeeded by: E. J. Pipkin

Member of the Maryland Senate from the 9th district
- In office October 21, 2004 – December 1, 2014
- Preceded by: Robert Kittleman
- Succeeded by: Gail Bates
- Constituency: Howard and Carroll counties

Member of the Howard County Council from the 5th district
- In office December 1998 – October 20, 2004
- Preceded by: Charles C. Feaga
- Succeeded by: Charles C. Feaga

Personal details
- Born: October 20, 1958 (age 67) Olney, Maryland, U.S.
- Party: Independent (since 2026)
- Other political affiliations: Republican (until 2026)
- Spouse: Robin Kittleman
- Children: 4
- Parent: Robert H. Kittleman
- Relatives: Trent Kittleman (stepmother)
- Education: University of Maryland, Baltimore County (BS); University of Maryland, Baltimore (JD)
- Profession: Politician, lawyer

Allan H. Kittleman (born October 20, 1958) is an American politician who was the ninth county executive for Howard County, Maryland from 2014 to 2018. Kittleman previously served as a Maryland State Senator from 2004 to 2014, representing the 9th district covering Howard and Carroll Counties, and was Senate Minority Leader from 2008 to 2011. He also previously served on the Howard County Council from 1998 to 2004.

== Education ==
Born on October 20, 1958, in Olney, Maryland, Kittleman attended Atholton High School in Howard County, Maryland. He earned a bachelor's degree from the University of Maryland, Baltimore County (UMBC), in 1981 and graduated with honors from the University of Maryland School of Law with a J.D. in 1988.

== Career ==
Kittleman was admitted to the Maryland Bar in 1988 and was an associate with Smith, Somerville & Case, 1988–1991 (legal assistant, 1984–1988) and a partner with Herwig & Humphreys, LLP from 1996 to 2003 (associate, 1991–1996). Kittleman has worked for the law firm Godwin, Erlandson, MacLaughlin, Vernon & Daney since 2008.

=== Maryland Senate ===
He is the son of the late Robert H. Kittleman and was appointed by Governor Bob Ehrlich (R) to fill his seat in the Maryland Senate. In 2006, Kittleman won re-election against Democrat Richard Corkran. He has a reputation as a social libertarian. In 2010, Senator Kittleman defeated Jim Adams by a wide margin in the general election after facing no primary opposition. On September 16, 2008, Kittleman was elected Minority Leader of the Maryland Senate. On January 30, 2010, the Senate Republican Caucus again chose him to serve as Minority Leader with Senator David R. Brinkley as Minority Whip, who defeated Senator Nancy Jacobs.

Senator Kittleman resigned as Minority Leader on January 18, 2011. During the 2011 General Assembly session, he was the only Republican in the Maryland State senate to speak in favor of or vote for a failed bill seeking to legalize same sex marriage.

=== County Executive ===
Kittleman was elected County Executive of Howard County, defeating Councilwoman Courtney Watson in the 2014 election. Kittleman's declared priorities as executive included improving the delivery of human services, closing the education gap and rebuilding infrastructure throughout Howard County.

Kittleman spent $1.1 million on school site security, including $800,000 for hiring three school resource officers and a supervisor for them.

He created and later expanded the "Achieve 24/7 initiative" which provided small grants to support mental health support and racial equity resources in schools.

Kittleman helped develop a draft proposal which suggested making zoning changes and architectural updates to the Long Reach Village Center.

Kittleman increased the county operating budget by 15.5% from about $1.4 billion to $1.6 billion over the course of his term, and his budgets passed unanimously each year in the 4–1 majority Democratic County Council. Kittleman brought many projects to completion that had been discussed for decades but never addressed, including a new Howard County Circuit Courthouse, expansion of MD Rt 32, establishment of a Community Resources Campus, improvements to a pedestrian bridge over Route 29, and purchase of a $23.1 million plot of land intended for a new high school.

Controversial measures undertaken by his administration include reassessing the sustainable growth tier structure of the county in order to change which farmland was required to be in an agricultural preservation program. The structure was put in place in 2012 by County Executive Ken Ulman in 2013. On February 9, 2017, Kittleman vetoed a bill passed three days earlier by the County Council on a 3–2 vote to declare Howard County a sanctuary jurisdiction for illegal immigrants. He said that the bill was unnecessary because he knew of no complaints of unfair treatment due to immigration status.

Democratic County Councilman Calvin Ball III defeated Kittleman in the November 2018 election for County Executive. Kittleman said he was disappointed though he accepted the voters' decision and would seek to help Ball's transition.

=== Later career ===
Following his election defeat in 2018, Kittleman was appointed to the Maryland Workers' Compensation Commission by Governor Larry Hogan.

In September 2021, Kittleman announced he would run for County Executive of Howard County in the 2022 election. He cited community division and taxes as key issues for his campaign.

Kittleman sought and received campaign contributions from the Citizens' Election Fund, a tax-funded government program that provides money to candidates and bars them from accepting donations from businesses, PACs, or special interest groups. 2022 was the first year a local public campaign finance program was available. Kittleman had opposed the creation of the Citizens' Election Fund.

Kittleman lost to incumbent county executive Calvin Ball III in the general election on November 8, 2022, and conceded to Ball the following day.

In May 2026, Kittleman announced in an op-ed to The Baltimore Sun that he was leaving the Republican Party and registering as an unaffiliated voter, citing actions by the second Trump administration.

== Election results ==
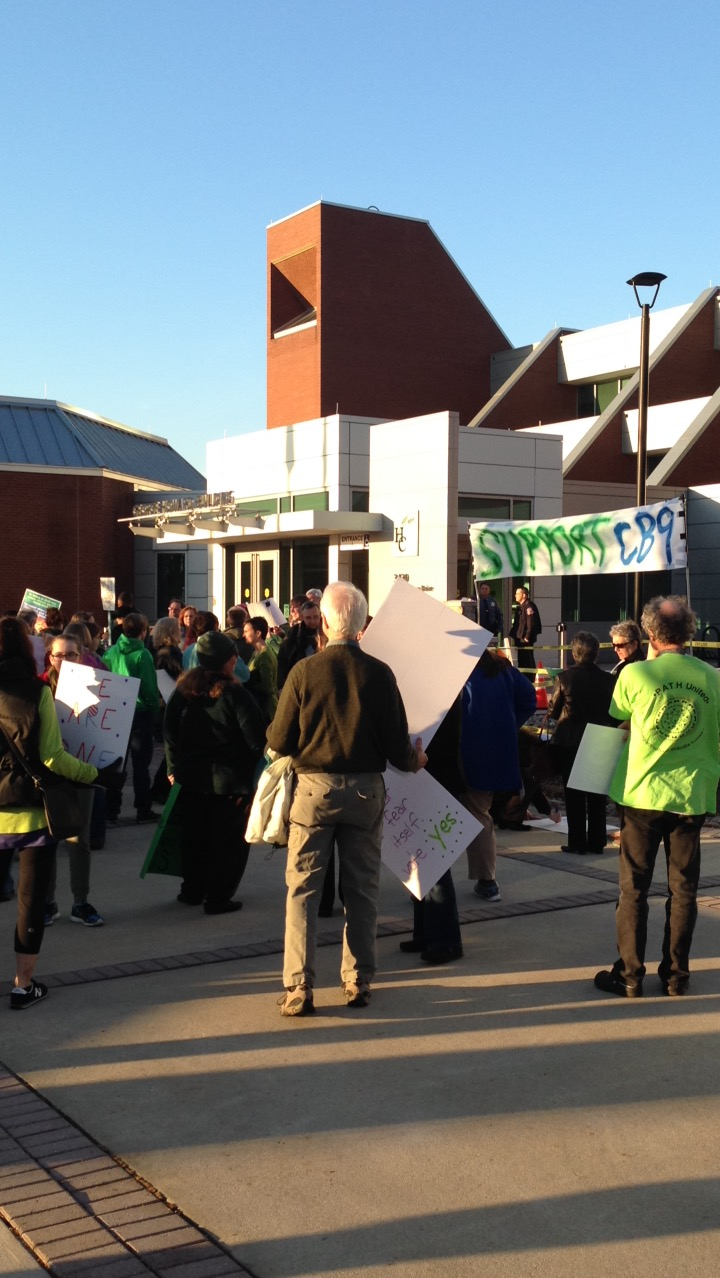
Protestors gathering in support of sanctuary legislation, which Kittleman vetoed

- 2022 race for Howard County Executive

Name	Votes	Percent	Outcome
Allan H. Kittleman, Rep.	53,162	40.81%	Lost
Calvin Ball III, Dem.	76,947	59.07%	Won
Other write-ins	162	0.12%	Lost

- 2018 race for Howard County Executive

Name	Votes	Percent	Outcome
Allan H. Kittleman, Rep.	67,457	47.1%	Lost
Calvin Ball III, Dem.	75,566	52.8%	Won
Other write-ins	124	0.1%	Lost

- 2014 race for Howard County Executive

Name	Votes	Percent	Outcome
Allan H. Kittleman, Rep.	53,207	51.2%	Won
Courtney Watson, Dem.	50,543	48.7%	Lost
Other write-ins	101	0.1%	Lost

- 2010 race for Maryland State Senate – District 9

Name	Votes	Percent	Outcome
Allan H. Kittleman, Rep.	36,641	67%	Won
Jim Adams, Dem.	18,198	33%	Lost
Other write-ins	60	0.11%	Lost

- 2006 race for Maryland State Senate – District 9

Name	Votes	Percent	Outcome
Allan H. Kittleman, Rep.	33,317	62.2%	Won
Rich Corkran, Dem.	20,232	37.8%	Lost
Other write-ins	33	0.1%	Lost

Maryland Senate
Preceded by Robert Kittleman	Member of the Maryland Senate from the 9th district 2004–2014	Succeeded by Gail Bates
Preceded by David Brinkley	Minority Leader of the Maryland Senate; 2008–2011	Succeeded by E. J. Pipkin
Political offices
Preceded by Kenneth Ulman	Executive of Howard County; 2014–2018	Succeeded by Calvin Ball III
