= Calvin Ball III =

American politician (born 1975)

Calvin Ball
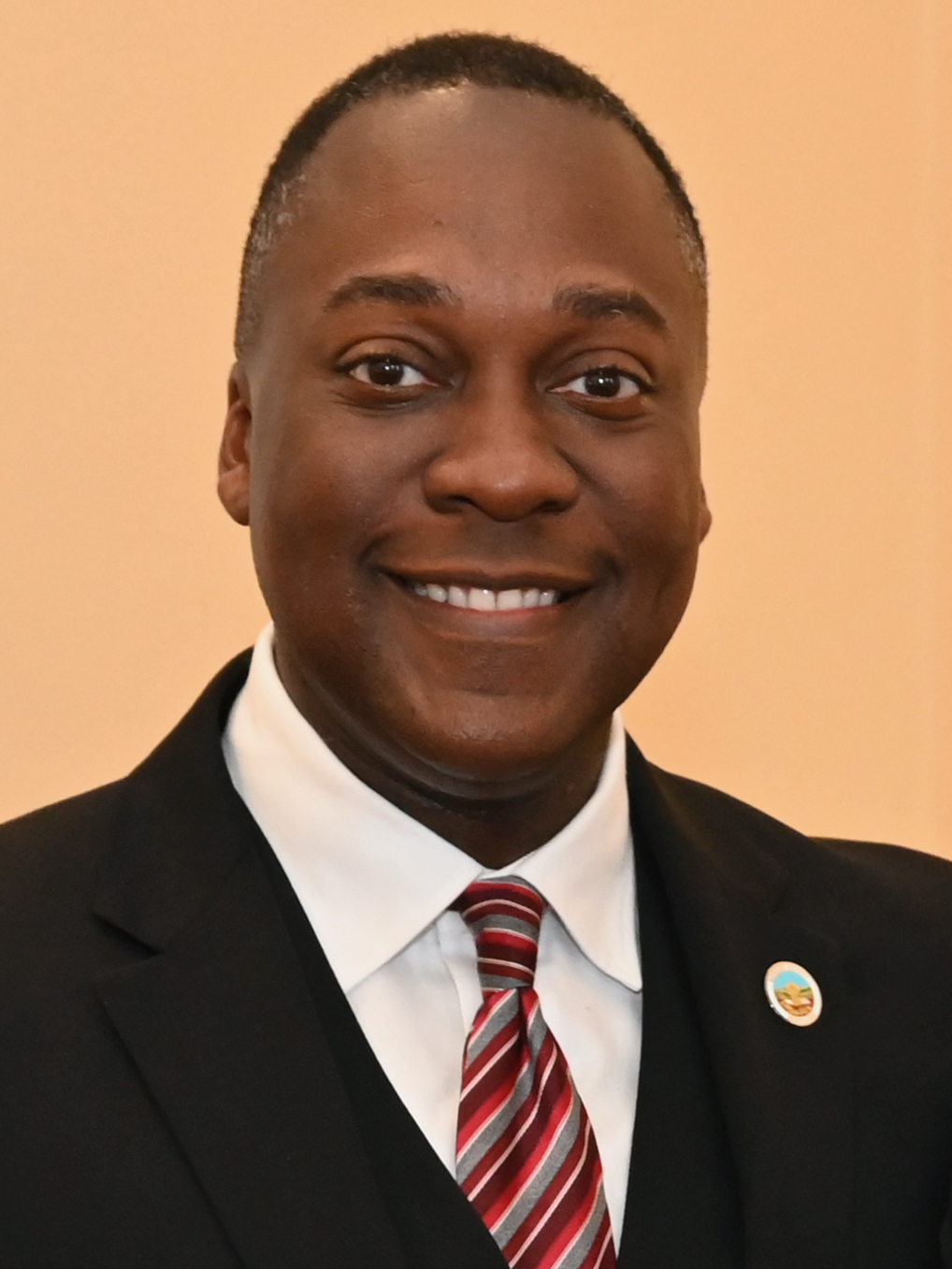

President of Baltimore City Community College
- Assuming office January 1, 2027
- Succeeding: Debra McCurdy

10th County Executive of Howard County
- In office December 3, 2018 – November 16, 2026
- Preceded by: Allan Kittleman
- Succeeded by: Brandee Ganz (acting)

Member of the Howard County Council from the 2nd district
- In office April 20, 2006 – December 3, 2018
- Preceded by: David Rakes
- Succeeded by: Opel Jones

Personal details
- Born: September 2, 1975 (age 51) Catonsville, Maryland, U.S.
- Party: Democratic
- Spouse: Shani Ball (m. 1998)
- Children: 2 daughters
- Education: Towson University (BA); University of Baltimore (MA); Morgan State University (EdD)

Calvin B. Ball III (born September 2, 1975) is an American politician who was the 10th county executive of Howard County, Maryland, from 2018 to 2026. A member of the Democratic Party, he is the first African-American to hold this office. He previously served as a member of the Howard County Council from the 2nd district from 2006 to 2018.

Born and raised in Catonsville, Maryland, Ball graduated from Towson University, the University of Baltimore, and Morgan State University. He worked as a supervisor in the Maryland Attorney General's Consumer Protection Division before running unsuccessfully for the Howard County Council in 2002. He was appointed to the Howard County Council in 2006 and elected to a full four-year term later that year, and reelected in 2010 and 2014. Ball was elected to serve as the county executive of Howard County in 2018, defeating incumbent county executive Allan Kittleman in the general election. He was reelected in 2022, again defeating Kittleman in the general election. During his tenure, Ball oversaw the county's response to the COVID-19 pandemic and flood mitigation efforts in Ellicott City.

In November 2026, Ball announced that he would resign as county executive on November 16, to become the interim president of Baltimore City Community College.

== Early life and education ==
Ball was born and raised in Catonsville, Maryland to father Calvin Ball Jr., a Vietnam War Air Force veteran, and Carolyn Ball, a computer assistant. He graduated from Woodlawn High School in 1993, and later attended Towson University, where he earned a Bachelor of Arts degree in philosophy and religion in 1997, the University of Baltimore, where he earned a Master of Arts degree in legal and ethical studies in 1999, and Morgan State University, where he earned a Doctor of Education degree in 2008. Ball is a member of the Kappa Delta Pi and Alpha Phi Alpha fraternities.

== Career ==
After graduating, Ball worked as a supervisor in the Consumer Protection Division of the Maryland Attorney General's office and as a part-time professor at the University of Phoenix.

In October 2001, he announced his candidacy for the Howard County Council in the second district, seeking to succeed term-limited councilmember C. Vernon Gray. He lost the Democratic primary, placing second behind David A. Rakes by a margin of 355 votes out of 4,451 votes cast. Following his defeat, state delegate-elect Neil F. Quinter hired Ball as a legislative aide. He also worked as assistant education and urban studies professor at Morgan State University, as a revitalization coordinator and community organizer for the Oakland Mills Village Board, and as a firefighter and emergency medical technician for the county.

In January 2006, Ball announced that he would again run for the Howard County Council in District 2, challenging Rakes.

== Howard County Council ==
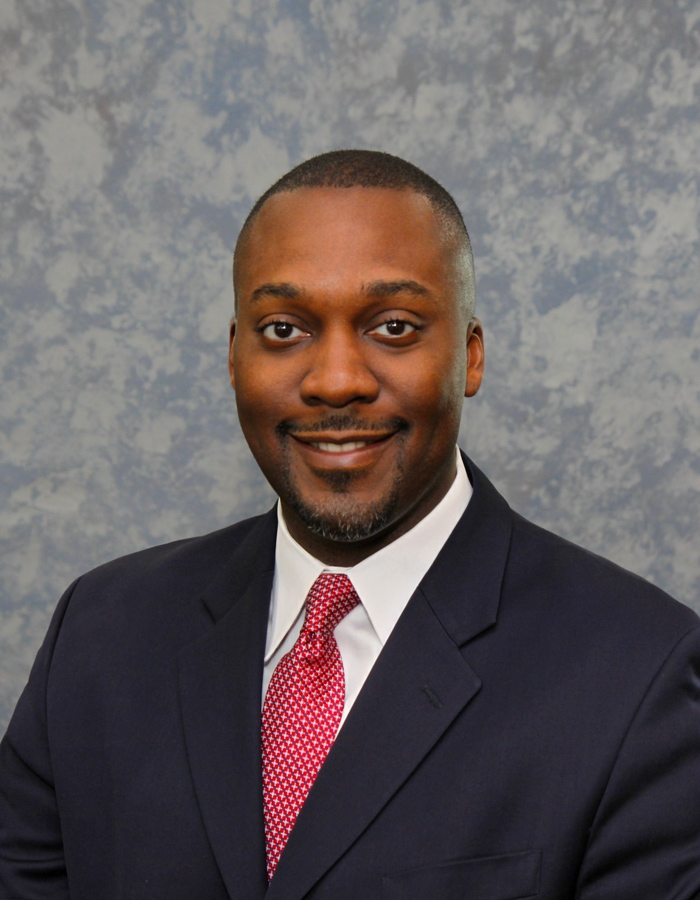
Ball's official portrait on the Howard County Council

In March 2006, after Rakes announced he would resign from the Howard County Council, Ball applied to serve out the remainder of his term. The Howard County Democratic Central Committee voted unanimously to nominate Ball to fill the vacancy on the Howard County Council. He was confirmed by the Howard County Council and sworn in on April 20, 2006. During his tenure, he gained a reputation as a social progressive. Ball was thrice elected as chair of the Howard County Council in 2006, 2010, and 2013, becoming the youngest person to ever hold this position.

In 2010, Ball was named as the chair of the Maryland Sustainable Growth Commission's education subcommittee. In 2012, he started a statewide minority caucus within the Maryland Association of Counties. In 2013, Ball was appointed as the chair of the Commission on Environmental Justice and Sustainable Communities.

== Howard County Executive ==
=== Elections ===
==== 2018 ====
On November 9, 2017, Ball announced his candidacy for Howard County Executive, challenging incumbent county executive Allan H. Kittleman. During his campaign, he spoke on national and statewide political trends and ran on platform that included increasing school funding, protecting the environment, and diversifying the county tax base.

During the election campaign, Ball was outraised by Kittleman, with total spending on the race reaching $1 million by the end of October 2018, but was aided by the national environment favoring Democrats. He received endorsements from the Howard County Education Association, Progressive Maryland, and former Governor Martin O'Malley.

Pre-election polling showed a tight race between Ball and Kittleman, despite Kittleman's popularity and uncontroversial tenure. Ball narrowly defeated Kittleman in the general election on November 7, 2018, receiving 52.8 percent of the vote.

==== 2022 ====
On June 1, 2021, Ball announced that he would seek a second term as county executive in 2022. During the election campaign, he outraised Republican challenger and former county executive Allan H. Kittleman, with total spending on the race reaching $1.3 million by the end of October 2022.

In June 2021, state delegate Robert Flanagan filed a public records request for emails exchanged by Ball, other county employees, and a lobbyist. The county identified 748 emails, but declined to release 497 of them, saying that doing so would reveal internal deliberations or information protected by attorney-client privilege. Flanagan filed a lawsuit in August 2021 against Ball, seeking the full release of the emails, arguing that they were withheld without being reviewed by the county's Office of Law. By the end of 2021, the county released nearly every email to Flanagan, who continued the lawsuit until it was dismissed in July 2022 after the county acknowledged that it had violated the state's Public Information Act and Open Meetings Act, and agreed to pay the maximum penalties. Kittleman subsequently ran ads highlighting the lawsuit, which Ball called a "Donald Trump, Dan Cox-style political stunt".

Ball defeated former county executive Kittleman in the general election in November 2022, receiving 59 percent of the vote.

=== Tenure ===
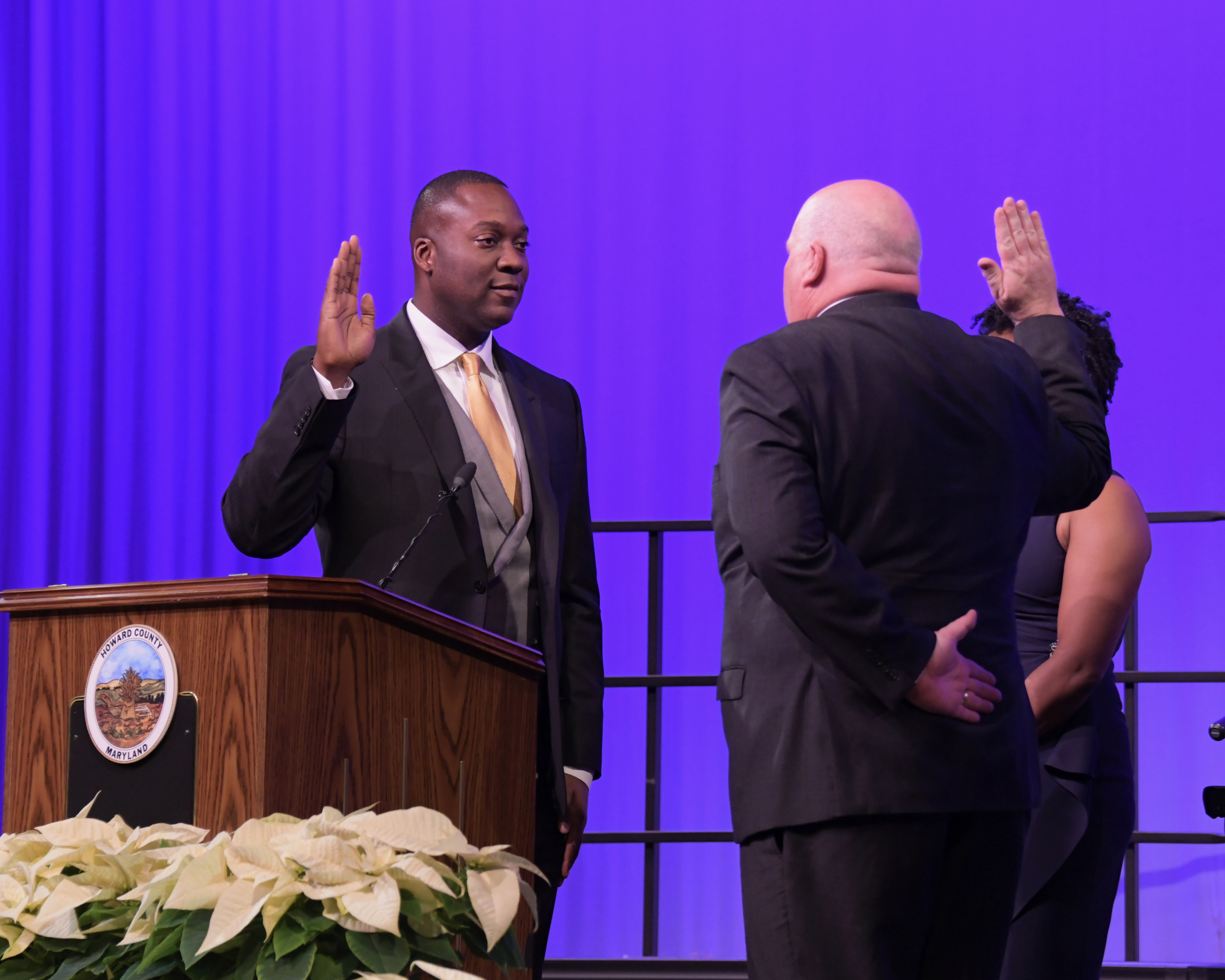
Ball being sworn in as county executive, 2018

Ball was sworn in as the new County Executive on December 3, 2018, becoming the county's first African-American county executive. During his first term in office, Ball focused on the issues of crime, climate change, and education.

In January 2019, Ball was named as treasurer for the Maryland Association of Counties. In January 2023, he was elected as the organization's president.

In September 2019, the Howard County Ethics Commission initiated an investigation into allegations that Ball illegally used the county seal in a video where he explains his commitment to the Democratic Party. The alleged infractions did not lead to a criminal prosecution because they were reported outside of the county's statute of limitations.

==== COVID-19 pandemic ====
In early March 2020, in preparation for the COVID-19 pandemic, Ball suspended all out-of-state travel for county employees and participated in a tabletop exercises on how to handle COVID-19. On March 15, 2020, Ball announced that Howard County had recorded its first case of COVID-19. On the same day, he declared a state of emergency and ordered the closing of all commercial gathering places in the county until further notice. He soon ordered the closing of all non-emergency county buildings. In April 2020, Ball released a plan for handling coronavirus patient surges at local hospitals amid an increase in the spread of COVID-19 cases in the county, which included expanding hospital capacities and streamlining vital equipment purchases. He also signed an executive order to provide essential employees with one-time discretionary bonuses. In May 2020, Ball signed the Rental Protection and Stability Act, which prevented landlords from raising rents during the COVID-19 pandemic, and allocated $500,000 toward food assistance and rental relief.

In May 2020, Ball cautioned against lifting coronavirus pandemic restrictions, saying that the county would not be "returning to normal any time that is immediate". The following day, after Governor Larry Hogan announced the state would begin its gradual reopening, Ball announced a reopening plan for the county, which included the termination of the countywide stay-at-home order. On May 20, he signed onto a letter expressing concern about the consequences of Hogan's partial reopening and asking for guidance from the administration as they decided how to proceed. The county entered its first stage of reopening on May 26, which included relaxed capacity restrictions on businesses and religious institutions, and entered Phase 2 on June 5.

From June to December 2020, Ball distributed $56.8 million in funding from the CARES Act toward the county services and various nonprofits throughout the county, especially those focused on child care, as well as $2.5 million in economic relief toward businesses impacted by the COVID-19 pandemic. During his state of the county address in October 2020, Ball said the county would launch a government-wide serology effort to determine if county employees had any COVID-19 antibodies. In November 2020, amid a spike in cases in Howard County, Ball announced new restrictions on indoor and outdoor gatherings.

In November 2020, Ball formed a 50-member HoCo RISE Collaborative, which included five workgroups tasked with producing a report on steps the county should take in recovering from the COVID-19 pandemic. The report was finalized and released in March 2021, which included recommendations relating to the county's rollout of COVID-19 vaccines.

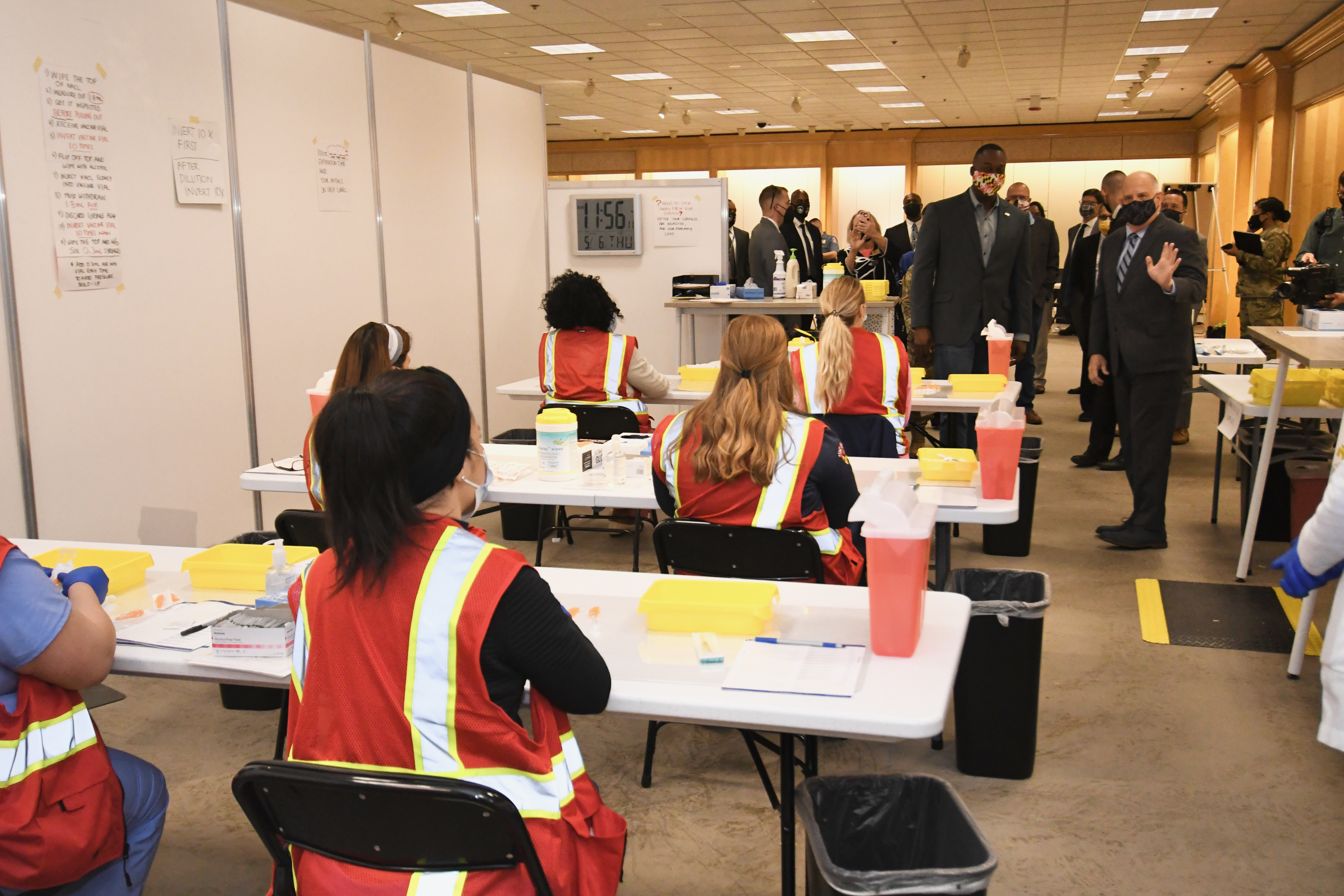
Ball tours the state mass vaccination site at the Mall in Columbia, 2021

In March 2021, Ball criticized Governor Larry Hogan for not notifying county executives in advance of his announcement that the state would be lifting most of its COVID-19 restrictions, but later said that the county would adopt the governor's order. In April 2021, he opened the county's first mass vaccination clinic at the Mall in Columbia and lifted the county's outdoor mask mandate and restaurant capacity restrictions. He declined to impose a COVID-19 vaccine mandate on the county's employees, and in August 2021 reopened all government buildings, but kept mask and social distancing mandates in place for unvaccinated individuals. The mask mandate was expanded to all individuals, regardless of vaccination status, less than two weeks later. In September 2021, Ball began distributing $63.2 million in funding from the American Rescue Plan Act of 2021 toward various county programs and services.

In December 2021, Ball signed an executive order re-instating the county's indoor mask mandate following a surge in COVID-19 cases. In February 2022, he signed another executive order lifting the county's mask mandate.

==== Flood mitigation ====
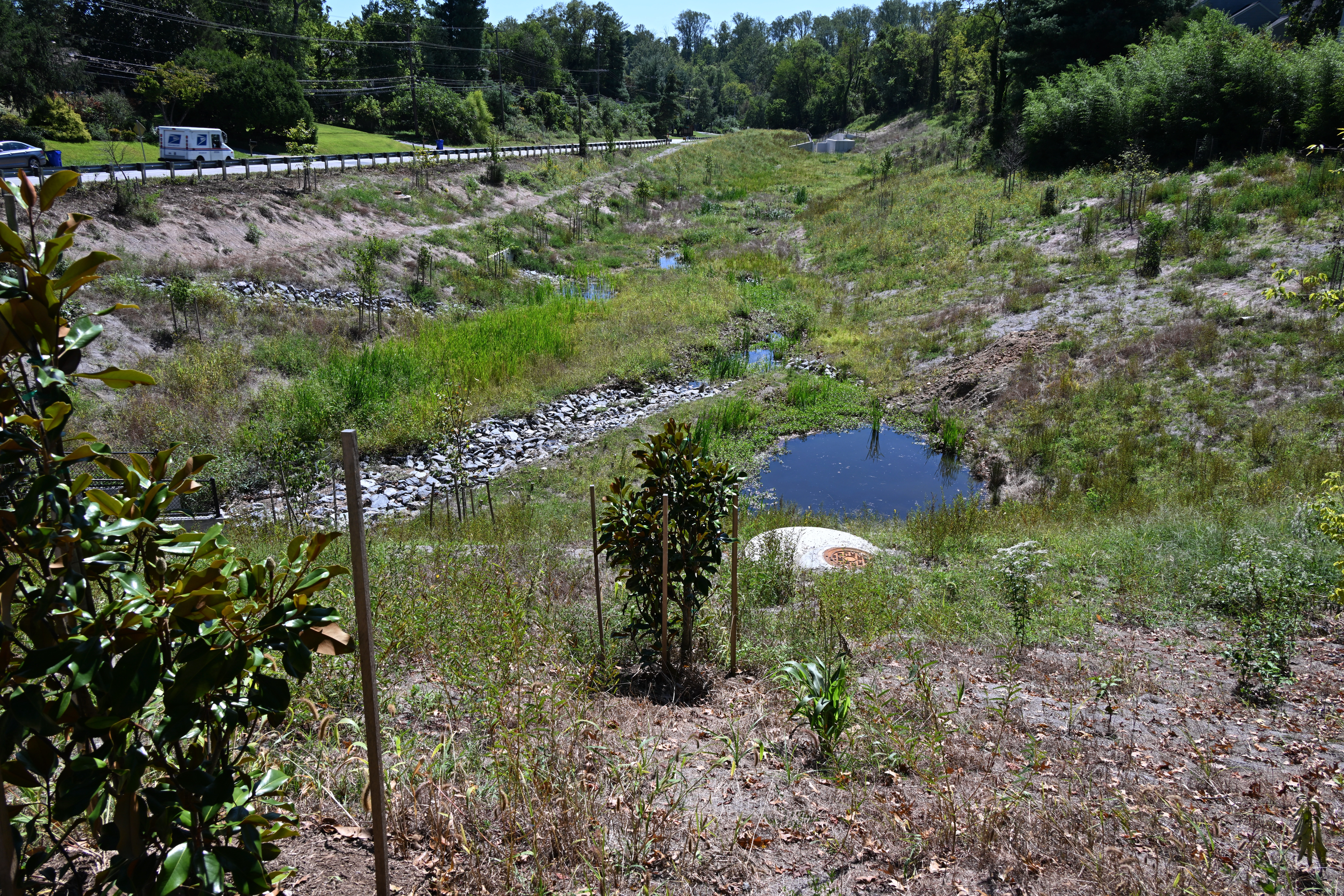
The Quaker Mill Flood Mitigation Pond (pictured in 2023) was one of several retention ponds completed under Ball's flood mitigation plan

In 2018, following floods in Ellicott City, Ball voted against county executive Allan H. Kittleman's $50 million proposal to mitigate flooding in Ellicott City, saying it did not address his concerns, including diverting funds from other county projects. During his county executive campaign, he said he opposed the plan, instead preferring to study digging a tunnel under the city to mitigate floodwater on the city's Main Street, which would have cost $80 million and take more than five years to complete. He also declined to say whether he would continue the flood mitigation plan if elected county executive.

In December 2018, Ball announced the first phase of his flood mitigation plan to decrease the volume and velocity of floodwaters in Ellicott City. The flood mitigation plan outlined seven major infrastructure projects including the Extended North Tunnel Project, a focal point of the Safe and Sound Plan. As of August 2026, three of the seven projects were completed; the H-7 Flood mitigation pond in October 2022, Quaker Mill Pond in February in 2023, and the H-4 Pond in June 2024.

By 2023, Howard County had secured more than $350 million of local, state, and federal funds for the plan and related to the projects, including a $75 million federal Water Resources Reform and Development Act loan to start the Extended North Tunnel's construction. In 2026, the construction of the 18-foot, North Tunnel project began.

== Baltimore City Community College ==
In November 2026, Ball announced that he would resign as Howard County Executive on November 16, 2026, to become the interim president of Baltimore City Community College. He succeeds Debra McCurdy, who steps down on December 31, 2026.

== Political positions ==
=== Crime and policing ===
During his first term as county executive, Howard County experienced an overall decrease in crime, including a 40 percent reduction in violent crimes, in addition to the largest increase in police hiring in the county in 15 years.

In his 2019 budget, Ball sought to phase out the police's aviation program, citing the county's $108 million deficit. The program was replaced by a surveillance drone program in 2020.

In June 2020, following the murder of George Floyd and subsequent protests, Ball said the county would be "revisiting" its police body camera pilot program. In his 2021 budget proposal, he allocated $3.2 million toward fully implementing the pilot program, which was later reallocated to the Howard County Public School System, delaying its implementation for a year. In his 2022 budget proposal, he included $1.6 million in funding from the American Rescue Plan Act of 2021 toward implementing the program by October.

In April 2021, Ball said he supported proposed reforms to the county's school resource officer program, which included the removal of officers from county middle schools and requiring police to wear body cameras. The body cameras program went into effect in August 2022. In October 2021, he proposed legislation to create a county Police Accountability Board to handle complaints about police misconduct. In February 2022, Ball signed the legislation to establish the Howard County's Police Accountability Board to review the outcome of complaint investigations and identify trends that could improve policing.

=== Development initiatives ===
During his tenure on the Howard County Council, Ball supported the county's acquisition of office space in Columbia to build affordable housing units. In 2006, he introduced a bill that would exempt affordable housing from certain zoning restrictions on commercially zoned land. He later withdrew the bill due to its proximity to the 2006 general election. In June 2012, Ball said he supported a bill to revitalize areas around the U.S. Route 1 corridor. In May 2014, he supported a bill to limit where new affordable housing could be built and requiring the county's Department of Housing to build affordable housing units in areas with low levels of poverty, which he said would "encourage a full spectrum" of housing. In April 2019, Ball issued his first veto as county executive on a bill that would have expanded the size of buffer zones on scenic roads.

In June 2012, Ball said he opposed a proposal by county executive Kenneth Ulman to require the Howard County Department of Planning and Zoning to provide public notification at least 60 days before it started its comprehensive rezoning plan to incentivize property owner participation. In December 2015, he introduced legislation to remove the one acre limit on solar farms on rural properties.

In September 2017, Ball said he supported a state lawsuit against the Federal Aviation Administration over noise from new flight patterns at the Baltimore/Washington International Airport. During the 2022 legislative session, he supported a bill to study and make recommendations on the impacts of aircraft on communities surrounding BWI.

During his tenure as county executive, Ball oversaw renovations of the Historic County Courthouse and the development of a new Performing Arts Center. He also transferred the lease of the old Ellicott City Jail to the nonprofit organization Preservation Maryland, which would be tasked with transforming the jail into a shared space for community activities and as the nonprofit's new headquarters.

In August 2019, Ball said he supported increasing school surcharge fees to pay for new school construction. During the 2020 legislative session, he testified in support of the Built to Learn Act, a bill that would allow the Maryland Stadium Authority to issue up to $2.2 billion in bonds to pay for school construction projects.

In October 2023, Ball proposed a package of housing bills that included proposals to expand affordable housing in Howard County and to cap on annual rent increases at 10 percent. The Howard County Council declined to bring up any of the housing bills for a vote, which prompted Ball to abandon the bills.

=== Education ===
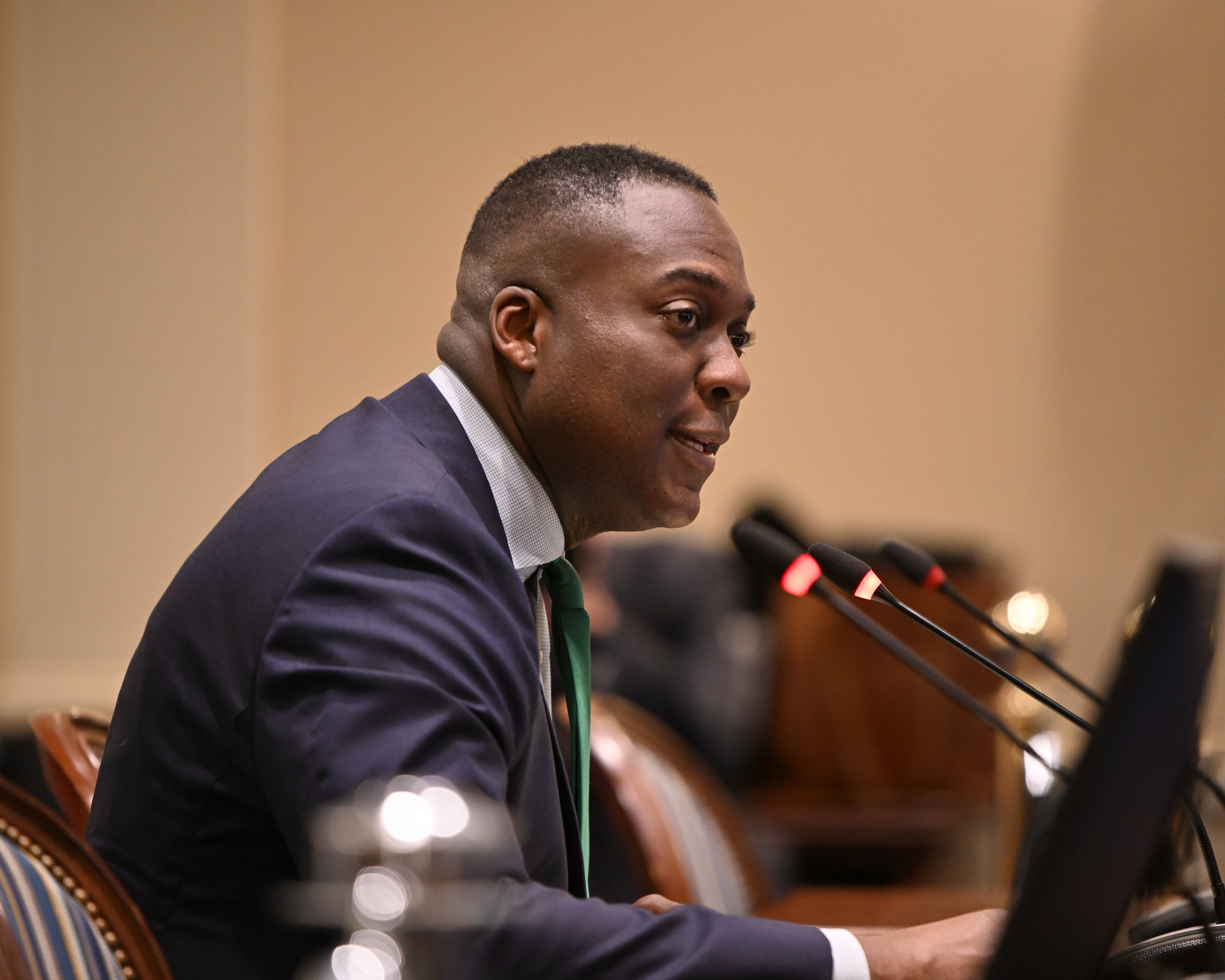
Ball testifying for the SERVE Act, 2023

In 2006, shortly after being appointed to the Howard County Council, Ball proposed an amendment to the county budget to allocate $220,000 toward hiring extra guidance counselors and custodians. In 2018, he proposed diverting $5.1 million in funding away from various departments and toward the Howard County Public School System's budget to maintain class sizes. In 2019, Ball criticized a proposal to allocate $8 million toward retaining class sizes and teacher jobs.

In 2016, Ball introduced legislation to create a committee to review the county school system's financial processes.

During his county executive campaign, Ball said he supported increasing the county's education spending, decreasing classroom sizes, and expanding career education programs.

In March 2019, Ball expressed concerns with the county school system's $973 million spending plan proposal, which represented a 16 percent increase in education funding, saying that the county would need to either raise taxes or eliminate another department's funding entirely to fully fund the request. In April, he proposed a $605 million budget for the county school system. The county's education budget proposal was lowered to $894 million following negotiations, and was unanimously adopted by in June 2019.

In June 2019, Ball asked the Maryland State Department of Education to conduct a performance audit of the county school system, which was unanimously approved by the Howard County Board of Education and County Council in July 2019 after Ball agreed to narrow the scope of the audit. The audit was conducted by the New York-based accounting firm CohnReznick, who in October 2019 released a comprehensive report recommending that the school system make efforts to reduce its $39 million health care deficit. Following the audit, Ball released a 10-step plan to eliminate the deficit by the end of 2024, which was unanimously approved by the school board in February 2020. In his 2020 and 2021 budget proposals, he included a combined $17.2 million toward paying off the deficit. In December 2022, officials announced that the Howard County Public School System had eliminated its health fund deficit.

In 2020, Ball proposed a $620 million budget for the county schools system as well as $68 million toward new school construction projects. In 2021, Ball proposed a $24 million increase toward the county's $942 million school system budget, which was approved by the school board in May 2021. In 2022, he proposed $1.025 billion in funding for the school system, including $35 million towards school construction projects. In 2023, Ball proposed a $1.1 billion budget for the Howard County Public School System, a $47 million increase and the largest single-year increase in school funding in county history.

In September 2022, Ball authored a letter opposing the county school system's proposed redistricting plan, expressing concerns about the impact student reassignments would have on Elkridge, Maryland.

=== Environment ===
Ball supports Maryland's "Rain Tax". In March 2013, during debate on a county bill to implement the state-mandated stormwater fee, he introduced an amendment that would limit increases to the fee to $15 a year. In March 2016, Ball voted against a proposal to phase out the stormwater fee.

During his county executive campaign, Ball said he would update the county's Climate Action Plan to incentivize open space and forest preservation. In February 2019, he announced that the county would join the Paris Agreement and pledged to achieve net-zero emissions in the county by 2050. That same year, Ball proposed reforms to the Howard County Forest Conservation Act that would require residential developers to manage 75 percent of their forest retention and replanting on-site as well as increase reforestation requirements. The proposed reforms were amended by the Howard County Council, then passed into law. In December 2019, Ball signed into law a bill imposing a 5 cent fee on disposable plastic bags in stores.

In 2020, Ball entered into a 25-year solar power purchasing agreement with KDC Solar, Inc., that would generate more than half of the county's electricity usage. April 2026, Ball announced that Howard County would become a community solar developer, the first jurisdiction in Maryland to do so.

In June 2023, Ball released the "HoCo Climate Forward" plan for addressing climate change in the county. The plan set goals to reduce climate pollution by 60% below 2005 baseline levels by 2030 and net zero by 2045. By 2025, the second Howard County Climate Forward Annual Report showed a 26% reduction of community-wide greenhouse gas emissions from 2005 baseline levels.

=== Gun control ===
In March 2015, Ball supported legislation to prohibit carrying weapons on Howard County property, which was signed into law by county executive Allan Kittleman in May.

=== Healthcare ===
In March 2019, Ball appeared in an ad to support legislation establishing the Prescription Drug Affordability Board, a body tasked with making recommendations to the Maryland General Assembly on how to make prescription drugs more affordable.

In May 2019, Ball joined a state lawsuit against OxyContin manufacturer Purdue Pharma for its role in the opioid epidemic.

In April 2025, Ball pledged $5 million to the Johns Hopkins Howard County Medical Center for a new observation unit.

=== Immigration ===
In January 2017, after President Donald Trump signed Executive Order 13768 limiting federal funding to sanctuary cities, Ball introduced legislation to designate Howard County a "sanctuary county" for undocumented immigrants. The county council voted to pass the bill, which was vetoed by county executive Allan Kittleman. Ball voted for the unsuccessful attempt to override Kittleman's veto on the bill.

In March 2017, Ball criticized Executive Order 13769, which decreased the number of refugees admitted into the United States and suspended entry to individuals whose countries do not meet adjudication standards under U.S. immigration law, calling it "intolerable".

In September 2020, Ball revised the county's contract with U.S. Immigration and Customs Enforcement (ICE) to only allow the agency to detain immigrants convicted of a "crime of violence" at the Howard County Detention Center. In October, he vetoed a bill that would have ended the county's contract with ICE. In December 2020, Ball signed the Liberty Act, which prohibited county employees from asking residents about their immigration status and banned discrimination on the basis of citizenship status. He opposed an unsuccessful 2022 referendum on repealing the Liberty Act. In March 2021, after the Maryland General Assembly passed legislation prohibiting counties from contracting with ICE, Ball announced that he would end the county's contract with ICE.

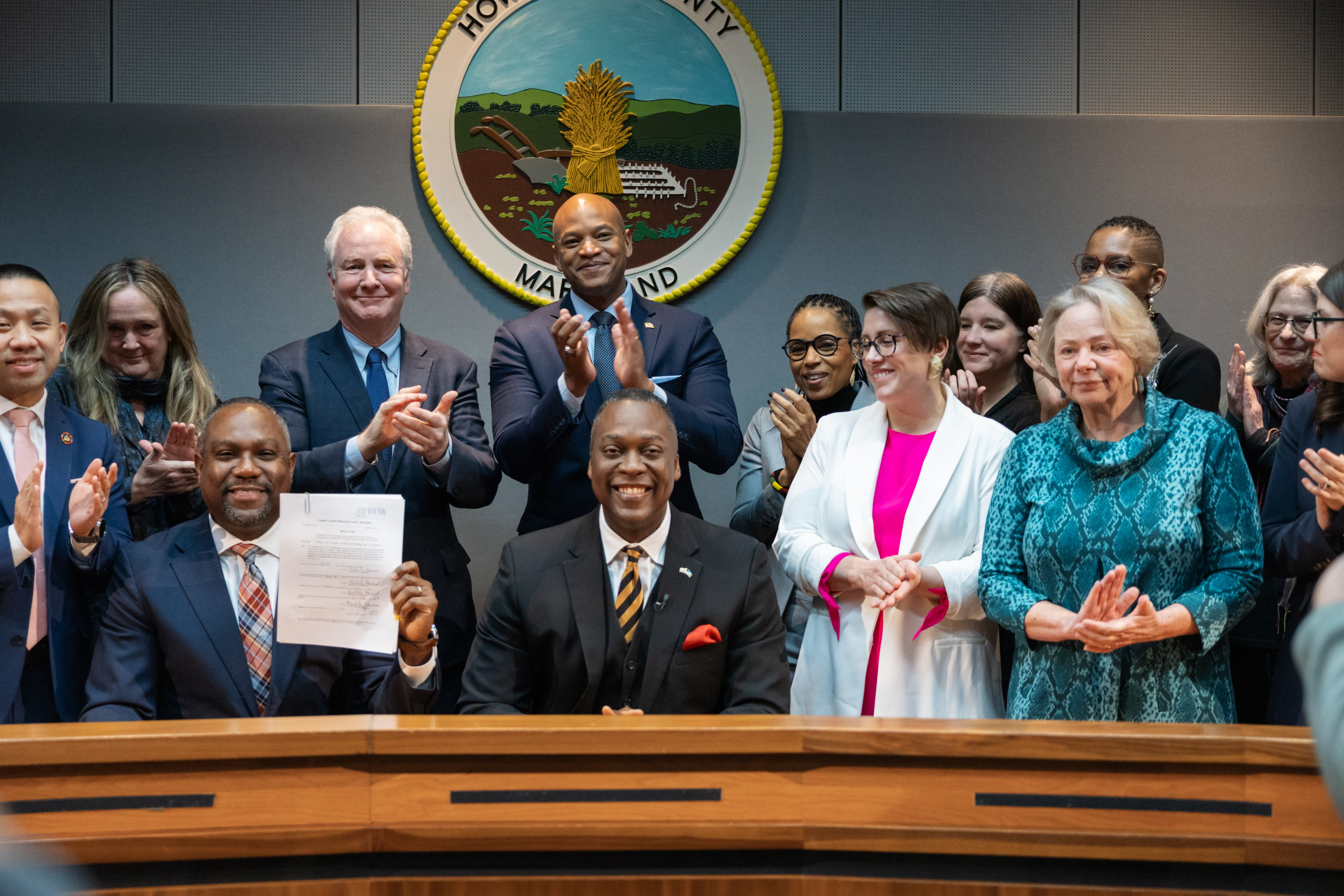
Ball signs into law legislation to block a proposed U.S. Immigration and Customs Enforcement detention facility in Elkridge, 2026

In January 2026, following reports that ICE was planning to renovate a building in Elkridge to be an immigration detention facility, Ball introduced legislation that would prohibit privately owned buildings from being used as detention centers. Howard County officials revoked a building permit for the proposed immigration detention facility a few days later. The Howard County Council unanimously voted to pass Ball's legislation to block the private immigration detention center in February 2026. Later that month, Ball testified in support of a bill in the Maryland General Assembly that would impose similar zoning restrictions on private immigration detention facilities statewide.

=== Minimum wage ===
In July 2007, Ball introduced legislation to raise Howard County's minimum wage to $12.41 an hour.

During his county executive campaign, Ball said he wanted to provide all school employees with a "living wage". After winning election in 2018, he declined to raise the minimum wage on the county level, saying that it should be addressed at the state level. In February 2019, Ball said he supported a bill to raise the statewide minimum wage to $15 an hour. In December 2021, he signed a bill to raise the county's minimum wage to $16 an hour by 2026 into law.

=== National politics ===
Ball supported U.S. Senator Barack Obama in the 2008 Democratic Party presidential primaries, volunteering in canvassing efforts for Obama in Howard County. In 2012, he served as a convention delegate pledged to Obama at the 2012 Democratic National Convention.

In November 2015, Ball endorsed former U.S. Secretary of State Hillary Clinton in the 2016 Democratic Party presidential primaries. He later served as a convention delegate pledged to Clinton at the 2016 Democratic National Convention.

In February 2024, Ball wrote a letter to President Joe Biden calling for a ceasefire in the Gaza war.

=== Social issues ===
In May 2006, Ball voted for a bill to ban smoking in public places by June 2007. In August 2015, he voted for legislation to ban vaping in public places.

In November 2011, Ball voted for a bill to ban discrimination against transgender people. In 2019, he launched the county's LGBTQ work group, which made several recommendations on supporting LGBT rights and groups. In April 2021, he signed legislation to requiring single-user bathrooms include gender-neutral signage. In June 2022, he proposed creating a LGBTQIA+ commission to expand on recommendations made by the work group, which was unanimously approved by the Howard County Council in July 2022.

In May 2012, Ball introduced an amendment to the county charter to allow county councilmembers to serve an additional term before being term limited.

In November 2012, Ball introduced a bill to incentivize the hiring of people with disabilities, especially veterans, in county government positions.

In 2015, Ball introduced a bill to create nutritional guidelines for food and drinks sold from government-owned vending machines. The bill was passed by the Howard County Council, but vetoed by county executive Allan Kittleman. The county council voted in July 2015 to overturn Kittleman's veto on the bill.

In September 2016, following a report that accused Howard County Sheriff James Fitzgerald of discrimination and harassment toward his employees, Ball called the allegations "disturbing" and said Fitzgerald should consider resigning. Following Fitzgerald's resignation in October, Ball called on the county's Human Rights Commission to study recruitment and hiring practices in the county Department of Fire and Rescue Services, the Sheriff's Office, the Howard County Police Department, and the Howard County Public School System.

In August 2017, following the Unite the Right rally in Charlottesville, Virginia, Ball participated in a Black Lives Matter vigil in Columbia and called for the immediate removal of a Confederate monument at the county's Circuit Court building.

In June 2021, Ball announced that the county would divert mental health crisis calls to 9-1-1 to crisis counselors.

In September 2022, following the U.S. Supreme Court's decision in Dobbs v. Jackson Women's Health Organization, which overturned Roe v. Wade, Ball announced $1 million in funding toward expanding reproductive services at Howard Community College.

=== Taxes ===
In October 2006, Ball sought to delay the passage of a senior tax cut bill, seeking to introduce an amendment to prevent wealthy individuals from qualifying for the tax cut. In April 2007, during debate on the tax cut, he introduced amendments that would lower the annual income floor to $70,000 and another to raise the bill's asset test to $500,000 from $200,000. During the 2017 legislative session, Ball testified in support of a bill to expand the county's elderly property tax credit.

In July 2017, Ball voted against a bill to create a special tax district in Laurel as part of the county's tax incremental financing deal, pointing to a lack of community support for the district or the deal. In August 2017, he introduced a bill to repeal the tax deal.

In December 2017, Ball introduced legislation to provide tax credits for first responders living and working in the county.

During his county executive campaign, Ball said that he would not raise taxes, instead looking to beef up the county's commercial tax base by attracting outside companies and growing businesses. He also supported a statewide ballot initiative to dedicate funds from the state's casino revenues toward education. In May 2019, he proposed a 6 cent increase in the county's fire and rescue tax, which he said would pay for constructing and supporting two new fire stations. In 2020, Ball proposed adopting a progressive recordation tax and increasing the county's transfer tax by 0.5 percent.

== Personal life ==
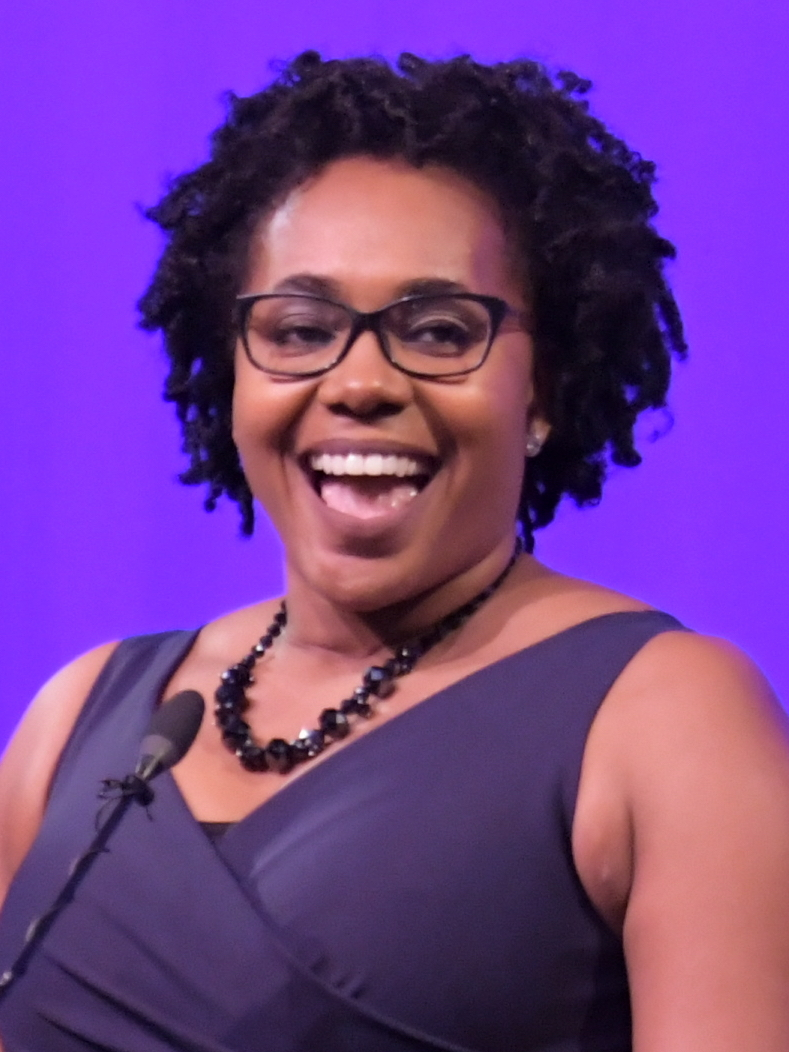
Shani Ball in 2018

Ball married his wife Shani Ball (born Shani Ratliff) at the Epiphany Episcopal Church in Towson, Maryland on March 28, 1998. Together, they have two daughters and have lived in Columbia, Maryland since 1999.

== Electoral history ==
Howard County Council District 2 Democratic primary election, 2002
Party	Candidate	Votes	%
Democratic	David A. Rakes	1,728	38.8
Democratic	Calvin Ball	1,373	30.8
Democratic	Michele Williams	965	21.7
Democratic	James Fitzgerald	385	8.6

Howard County Council District 2 Democratic primary election, 2006
Party	Candidate	Votes	%
Democratic	Calvin Ball (incumbent)	3,062	66.7
Democratic	Adam Sachs	1,530	33.3

Howard County Council District 2 election, 2006
Party	Candidate	Votes	%
Democratic	Calvin Ball (incumbent)	9,907	59.8
Republican	Gina Gabrielle Ellrich	6,638	40.1
Write-in		9	0.1

Howard County Council District 2 election, 2010
Party	Candidate	Votes	%
Democratic	Calvin Ball (incumbent)	11,707	67.6
Republican	Reg Avery	5,592	32.3
Write-in		29	0.2

Howard County Council District 2 election, 2014
Party	Candidate	Votes	%
Democratic	Calvin Ball (incumbent)	11,380	60.6
Republican	Ralph Colavita	7,369	39.3
Write-in		25	0.1

Howard County Executive Democratic primary election, 2018
Party	Candidate	Votes	%
Democratic	Calvin Ball	25,976	83.5
Democratic	Harry Dunbar	5,121	16.5

Howard County Executive election, 2018
Party	Candidate	Votes	%
Democratic	Calvin Ball	75,566	52.8
Republican	Allan H. Kittleman (incumbent)	67,457	47.1
Write-in		124	0.1

Howard County Executive election, 2022
Party	Candidate	Votes	%
Democratic	Calvin Ball (incumbent)	76,947	59.1
Republican	Allan H. Kittleman	53,162	40.8
Write-in		162	0.1

Political offices
Preceded by Allan Kittleman	Executive of Howard County; 2018–present	Incumbent
