= Maryland House of Delegates District 9A =

American legislative district

Maryland's legislative district 9A
- Represents parts of Montgomery County and Howard County
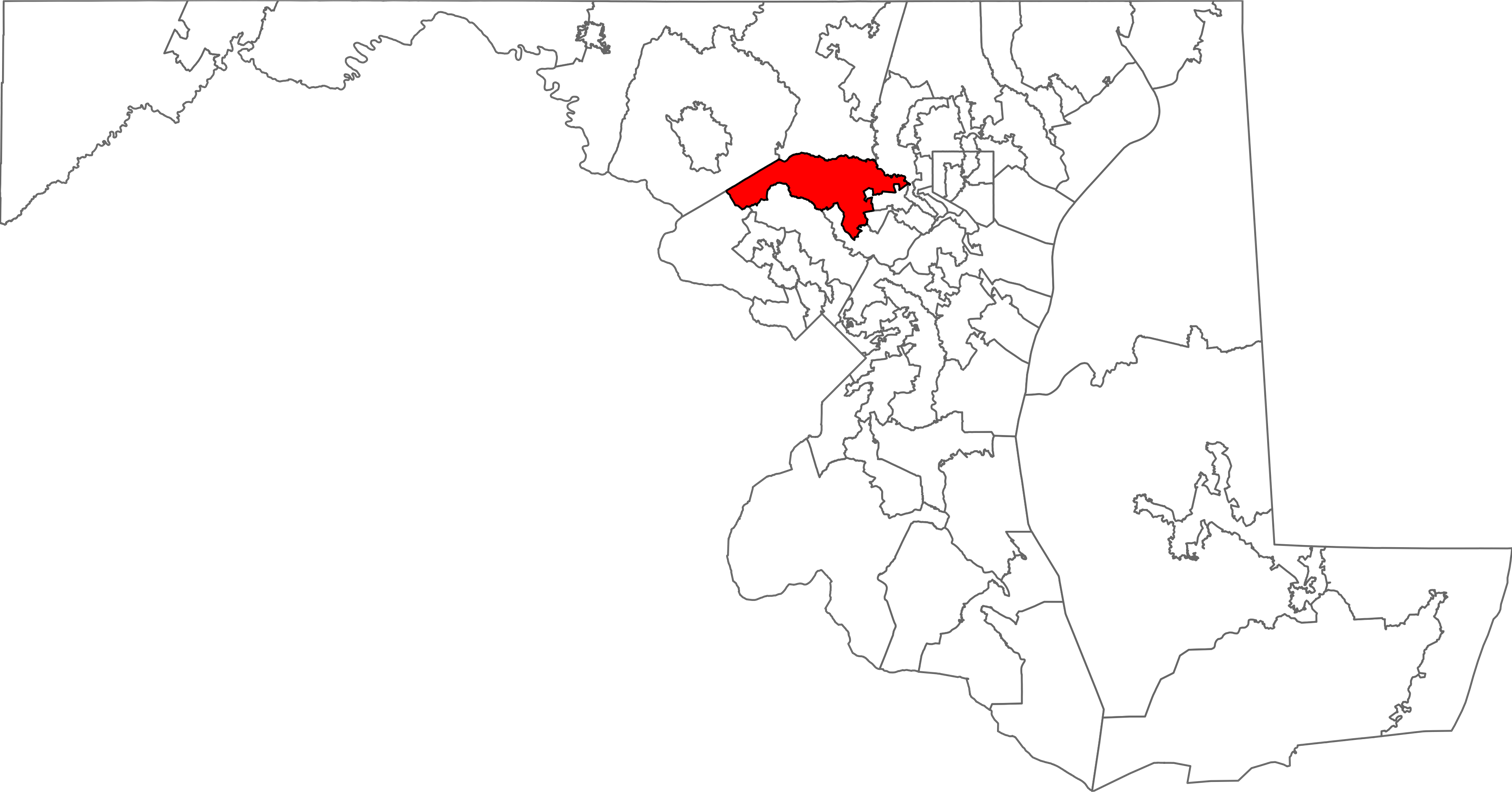
- Delegate(s): Natalie Ziegler (D); Chao Wu (D)
- Registration: 38.7% Republican; 37.0% Democratic; 22.8% unaffiliated
- Demographics: 68.1% White; 6.1% Black/African American; 0.2% Native American; 17.9% Asian; 0.0% Hawaiian/Pacific Islander; 1.2% Other race; 6.5% Two or more races; 3.9% Hispanic
- Population (2020): 97,589
- Voting-age population: 74,024
- Registered voters: 72,308

Maryland House of Delegates District 9A is one of the 71 districts that compose the Maryland House of Delegates. Along with subdistrict 9B, it makes up the 9th district of the Maryland Senate. District 9A includes parts of Montgomery County and Howard County, and is represented by two delegates.

== Demographic characteristics ==
As of the 2020 United States census, the district had a population of 97,589, of whom 74,024 (75.9%) were of voting age. The racial makeup of the district was 66,430 (68.1%) White, 5,989 (6.1%) African American, 169 (0.2%) Native American, 17,490 (17.9%) Asian, 28 (0.0%) Pacific Islander, 1,193 (1.2%) from some other race, and 6,304 (6.5%) from two or more races. Hispanic or Latino of any race were 3,821 (3.9%) of the population.

The district had 72,308 registered voters as of October 17, 2020, of whom 16,512 (22.8%) were registered as unaffiliated, 28,007 (38.7%) were registered as Republicans, 26,755 (37.0%) were registered as Democrats, and 631 (0.9%) were registered to other parties.

== Past Election Results ==
=== 1998 ===
Name	Party	Votes	Percent	Outcome
Martha Scanlan Klima	Republican	19,190	40.0%	Won
Wade Kach	Republican	18,382	38.0%	Won
Stephen C. Kirsch	Democratic	10,584	22.0%	Lost

=== 2002 ===
Name	Party	Votes	Percent	Outcome
Robert Flanagan	Republican	21,263	33.8%	Won
Gail H. Bates	Republican	20,783	33.0%	Won
Walter E. Carson	Democratic	10,424	16.6%	Lost
Tony McGuffin	Democratic	10,423	16.6%	Lost
Other Write-Ins		33	0.1%	

=== 2006 ===
Name	Party	Votes	Percent	Outcome
Gail H. Bates	Republican	22,862	39.6%	Won
Warren E. Miller	Republican	18,533	32.1%	Won
David Leonard Osmundson	Democratic	16,162	28.0%	Lost
Other Write-Ins		123	0.2%	

=== 2010 ===
Name	Party	Votes	Percent	Outcome
Gail H. Bates	Republican	21,709	30.6%	Won
Warren E. Miller	Republican	19,911	28.0%	Won
Maryann Maher	Democratic	15,264	21.5%	Lost
Jonathan Weinstein	Democratic	14,110	19.9%	Lost
Other Write-Ins		40	0.1%	

=== 2014 ===
Name	Party	Votes	Percent	Outcome
Trent Kittleman	Republican	24,371	37.5%	Won
Warren E. Miller	Republican	21,553	33.1%	Won
Walter E. Carson	Democratic	10,144	15.6%	Lost
James Ward Morrow	Democratic	8,906	13.7%	Lost
Other Write-Ins		99	0.2%	

=== 2018 ===
Name	Party	Votes	Percent	Outcome
Trent Kittleman	Republican	24,531	30.6%	Won
Warren E. Miller	Republican	19,563	24.4%	Won
Natalie Ziegler	Democratic	18,891	23.6%	Lost
Steven M. Bolen	Democratic	17,019	21.3%	Lost
Other Write-Ins		56	0.1%	
