= Warren E. Miller =

American politician (born 1964)

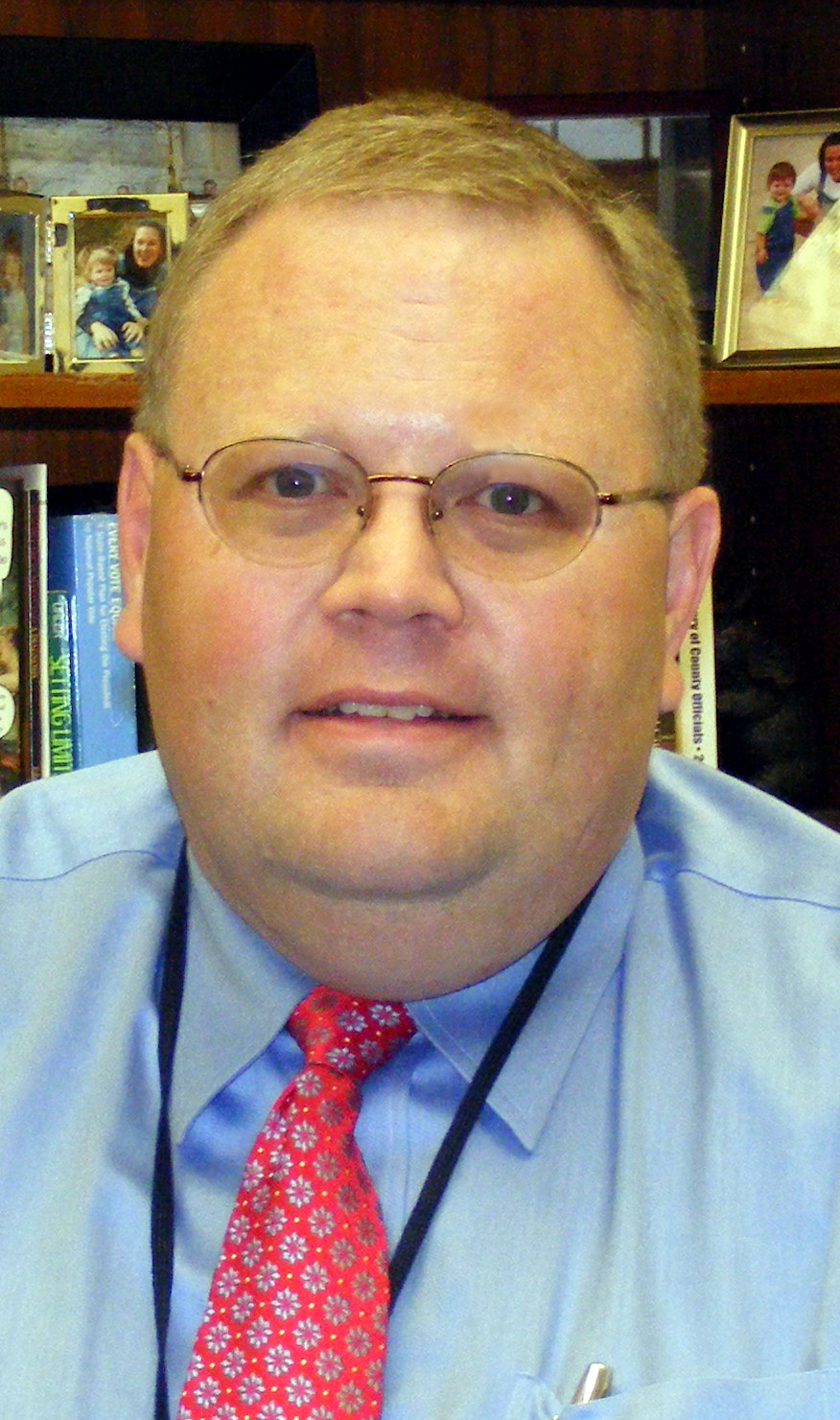

Member of the Maryland House of Delegates from the 9A district
- In office March 10, 2003 – December 30, 2020 Serving with Gail H. Bates
- Preceded by: Robert L. Flanagan
- Succeeded by: Reid Novotny

Personal details
- Born: October 5, 1964 (age 61) Riverdale, Maryland, U.S.
- Party: Republican
- Children: 2
- Education: Glenelg High School, Glenelg, Maryland
- Alma mater: Towson State University (B.S.)

Warren E. Miller (born October 5, 1964) was a member of the Maryland House of Delegates. Miller represented District 9A, which includes parts of Howard and Carroll counties. Miller was appointed by Governor Bob Ehrlich on March 7, 2003 to replace Robert L. Flanagan, who resigned from the Maryland House of Delegates on February 28, 2003, to become the Maryland Secretary of Transportation. On November 30, 2020, Miller announced his intent to resign at the end of 2020.

== Elections ==
In 2006, Miller, along with fellow Republican Gail H. Bates, defeated David Leonard Osmundson to maintain his District 9A seat.

== Education ==
Miller attended Glenelg High School in Howard County. He received his bachelor's degree in Business Administration in 1987 from Towson State University.

== Career ==
Shortly after college, Miller began to work as a Deputy Directory for the computer center at the White House Office of Presidential Personnel. In 1990, he became the confidential assistant to Assistant Administrator, Bureau for Legislative Affairs, Agency for International Development. Later, he was appointed as the special assistant to the White House Liaison, Office of Administrator, Agency for International Development, a position he held from 1991-1992. In 1992, he became the White House Liaison for the U.S. Office of Personnel Management. In 1994, he was the Congressional campaign manager for Roscoe Bartlett.

From 1995 until 1996, Miller was a programmer/analyst for Advanced Technology Systems. In 1996, he worked for Booz Allen Hamilton until 2005. Since 2006, Miller has been a business development manager for Human Touch LLC.

Finally, Miller was on the Howard County Republican Central Committee from 1998 - 2003.

As a member of the Maryland House of Delegates, Miller has served on the Economic Matters Committee since 2003, and the Joint Advisory Committee on Legislative Data Systems since 2007.

Miller has worked with fellow Republican Gail Bates to amended the Maryland Constitution to define marriage as the union between a man and a woman.

=== Legislative notes ===
- voted against the Clean Indoor Air Act of 2007 (HB359)
- voted against in-state tuition for illegal immigrants in 2007 (HB6)
- voted against the Healthy Air Act in 2006 (SB154)
- voted for slots in 2005 (HB1361)

== Election results ==
- 2006 Race for Maryland House of Delegates – District 9A

Voters to choose two:

Name	Votes	Percent	Outcome
Gail H. Bates, Rep.	22,862	39.6%	Won
Warren E. Miller, Rep.	18,533	32.1%	Won
David Leonard Osmundson, Dem.	16,162	28.0%	Lost
Other Write-Ins	123	0.2%	Lost

- 2010 Race for Maryland House of Delegates – District 9A

Voters to choose two:

Name	Votes	Percent	Outcome
Gail H. Bates, Rep.	21,709	30.6%	Won
Warren E. Miller, Rep.	19,911	28.0%	Won
Maryann Maher, Dem.	15,264	21.5%	Lost
Jonathan Weinstein, Dem.	14,110	19.9%	Lost
Other Write-Ins	40	0.1%	Lost

- 2014 Race for Maryland House of Delegates – District 9A

Voters to choose two:

Name	Votes	Percent	Outcome
Trent Kittleman, Rep.	24,371	37.5%	Won
Warren E. Miller, Rep.	21,553	33.1%	Won
Walter E. Carson, Dem.	10,144	15.6%	Lost
James Ward Morrow, Dem.	8,906	13.7%	Lost
Other Write-Ins	99	0.2%	Lost

- 2018 Race for Maryland House of Delegates – District 9A

Voters to choose two:

Name	Votes	Percent	Outcome
Trent Kittleman, Rep.	24,531	30.6%	Won
Warren E. Miller, Rep.	19,563	24.4%	Won
Natalie Ziegler, Dem.	18,891	23.6%	Lost
Steven M. Bolen, Dem.	17,019	21.3%	Lost
Other Write-Ins	56	0.1%	Lost
