= Gail H. Bates =

American politician (born 1945)

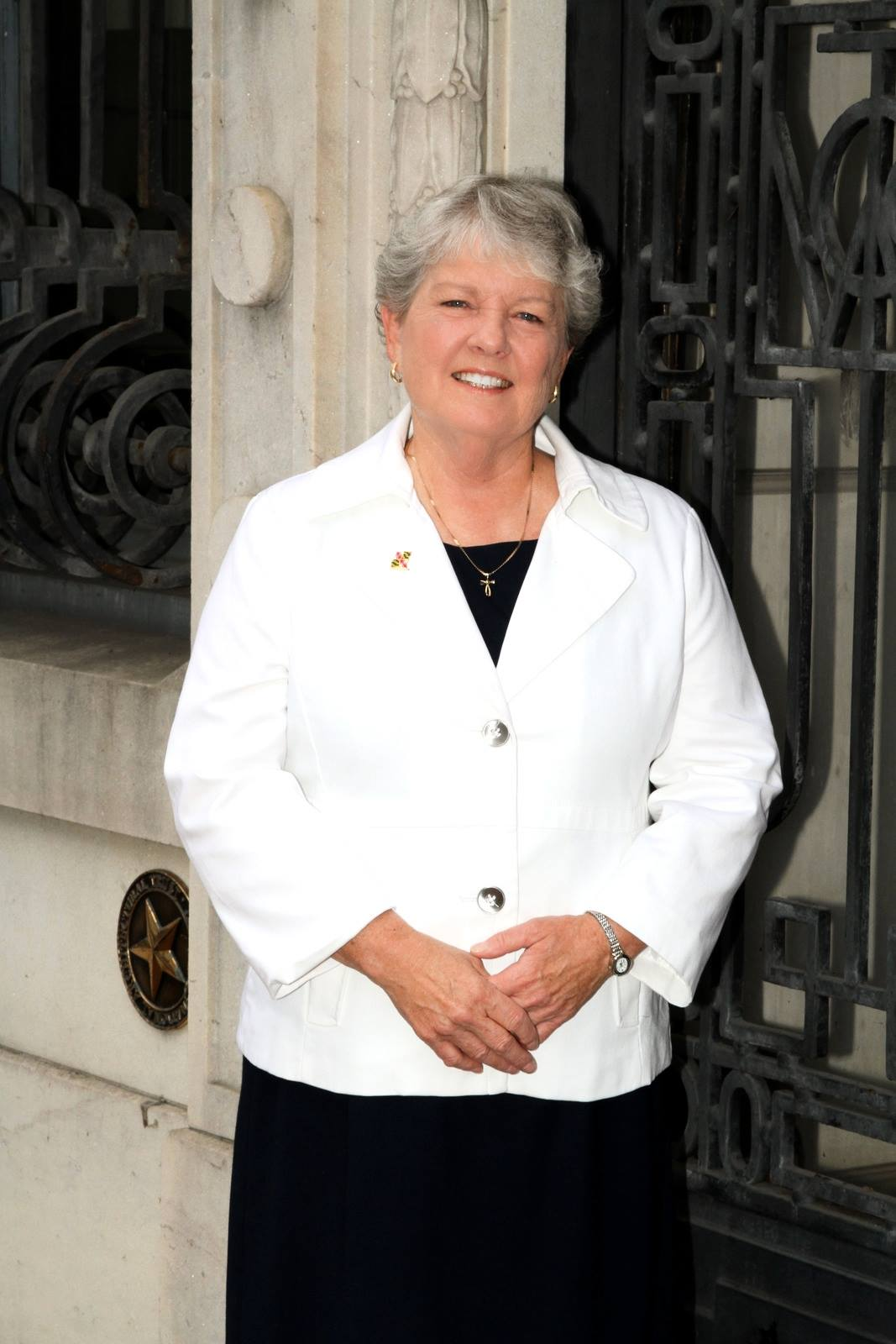

Member of the Maryland Senate from the 9th district
- In office January 14, 2015 – January 9, 2019
- Preceded by: Allan Kittleman
- Succeeded by: Katie Fry Hester

Member of the Maryland House of Delegates from the 9A district
- In office February 4, 2002 – January 14, 2015 Serving with Warren E. Miller and Robert L. Flanagan
- Preceded by: Robert Kittleman
- Succeeded by: Trent Kittleman

Personal details
- Born: December 24, 1945 (age 80) Washington, D.C., U.S.
- Party: Republican
- Education: University of Maryland, College Park (B.S.)

Gail Bates (born December 24, 1945) is a former member of the Maryland Senate from 2015 to 2019 and a former member of the Maryland House of Delegates from 2002 to 2015. She was selected to replace Robert Kittleman in the Maryland House of Delegates in February 2002 when Kittleman was selected to replace Chris McCabe in the Maryland State Senate. In a close election in 2018, Bates was defeated by non-profit executive Katie Fry Hester by 1.7 percentage points. Bates was nominated to serve on the state Board of Education by Gov. Larry Hogan in February 2019.

== Education ==
Bates graduated from the University of Maryland in 1968 with a B.S. in Education. She later took courses at UMBC.

== Career ==
Bates was a mathematics and home economics teacher in Anne Arundel County from 1968 to 1973. She then served as an office manager for H&R Block from 1976 to 1980. In 1980, she held a position as a tax supervisor for Mark Buckley, C.P.A. From 1983 to 1984 she was a manager for the Records and Tax Department of the Maryland Farm Bureau. Since 1984, she has been a sole proprietor as a Certified Public Accountant. She served as an assistant to the Howard County Executive from 1991 to 1998 and was Chief of Staff for Delegate Donald E. Murphy in District 12A from 1999 until 2002.

Bates has been an active member of different organizations such as the Howard County Republican Club, the Maryland Federation of Republican Women, the Howard County Republican Central Committee (serving as Treasurer from 1980 until 1984), the Howard County Chamber of Commerce, the Maryland Association of Certified Public Accountants, and Howard County Republican Women, serving as president since 2001.

As a member of the Maryland General Assembly, Bates served on the Appropriations Committee, the Joint Committee on Children, Youth, and Families, and the Special Joint Committee on Pensions.

She was a board member of the Howard County Chapter of the American Red Cross from 1996 until 1999. She has served with the Christian Jail Ministry since 1997 and the Howard County Farm Bureau since 1998. She has been the Treasurer of the Howard County Tourism Council since 2004. She is a member of the Therapeutic Horsemanship Association and received the Life Achievement Award from the Howard County Republican Central Committee in 1990.

In 2007, Bates sponsored a bill that would have defined marriage as between one man and one woman in the state of Maryland, barring same-sex marriage in the state. The bill was voted down in the Judiciary Committee.

=== Legislative notes ===
- voted against the Clean Indoor Air Act of 2007 (HB359)
- voted against the Healthy Air Act in 2006 (SB154)

== Election results ==
In the 2002 election, Bates defeated Democrats Walter E. Carson and Tony McGuffin to maintain the seat she'd been appointed to. In 2006, District 9A would be represented by two delegates. She won again along with fellow Republican Warren E. Miller, when they defeated Democrat David Leonard Osmundson.

- 2018 Race for Maryland State Senate - District 9

Voters to choose one:

Name	Votes	Percent	Outcome
Katie Fry Hester, Dem.	33,493	50.8%	Won
Gail H. Bates, Rep.	32,347	49.1	Lost

- 2010 Race for Maryland House of Delegates – District 9A

Voters to choose two:

Name	Votes	Percent	Outcome
Gail H. Bates, Rep.	21,709	30.6%	Won
Warren E. Miller, Rep.	19,911	28.0%	Won
Maryann Maher, Dem.	15,264	21.5%	Lost
Jonathan Weinstein, Dem.	14,110	19.9%	Lost
Other Write-Ins	40	0.1%	Lost

- 2006 Race for Maryland House of Delegates – District 9A

Voters to choose two:

Name	Votes	Percent	Outcome
Gail H. Bates, Rep.	22,862	39.6%	Won
Warren E. Miller, Rep.	18,533	32.1%	Won
David Leonard Osmundson, Dem.	16,162	28.0%	Lost
Other Write-Ins	123	0.2%	Lost

- 2002 Race for Maryland House of Delegates – District 9A

Voters to choose two:

Name	Votes	Percent	Outcome
Gail H. Bates, Rep.	20,783	33.0%	Won
Robert L. Flanagan, Rep.	21,263	33.8%	Won
Walter E. Carson	10,424	16.6%	Lost
Tony McGuffin	10,423	16.6%	Lost
Other Write-Ins	33	0.1%	Lost
