= Kenneth Ulman =

American politician (born 1974)

Ken Ulman
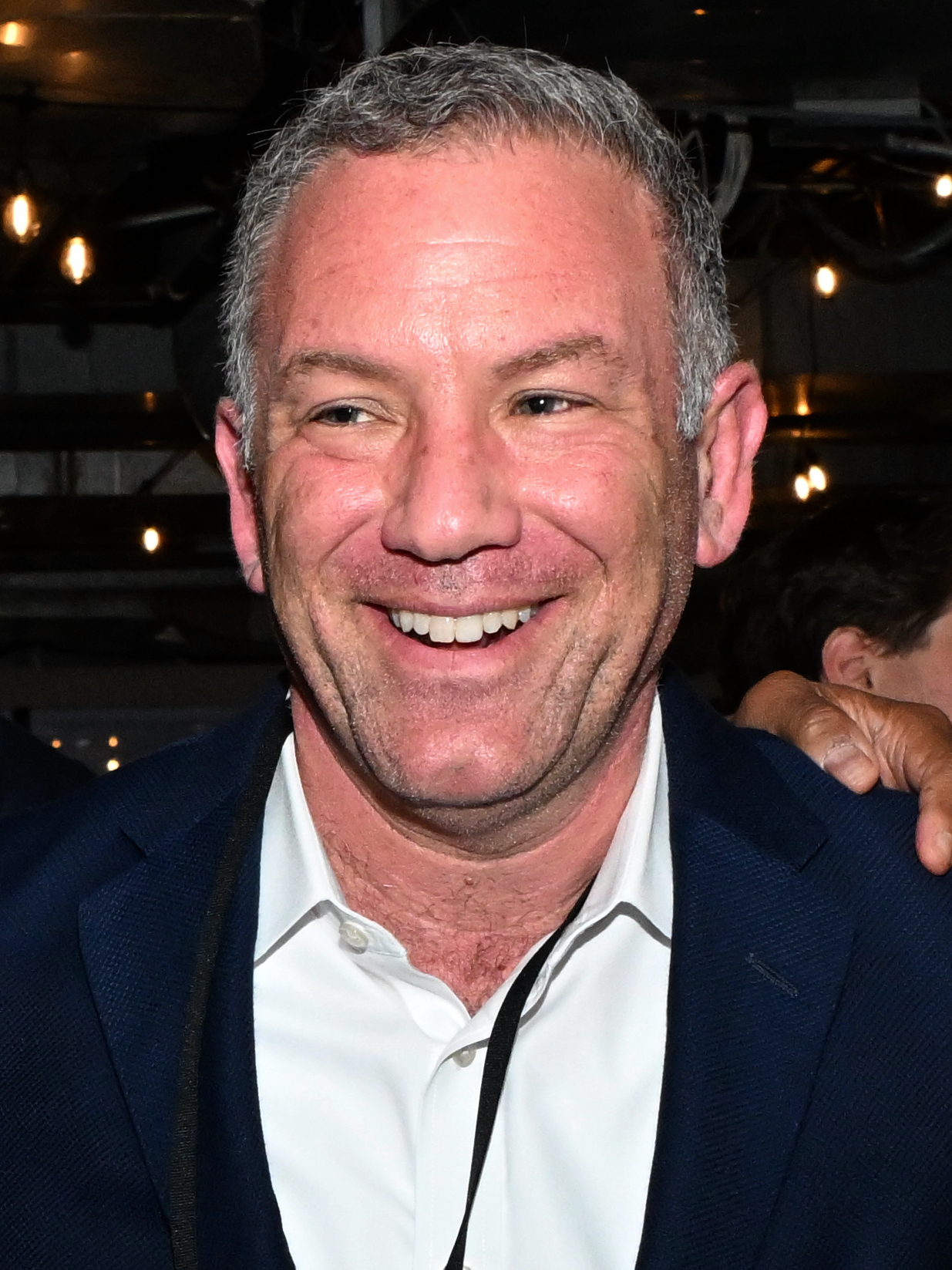
- Ulman in 2023

Chair of the Maryland Democratic Party
- In office November 18, 2023 – June 13, 2025
- Preceded by: Everett Browning (acting)
- Succeeded by: Charlene Dukes (acting)

8th County Executive of Howard County
- In office December 4, 2006 – December 1, 2014
- Preceded by: James N. Robey
- Succeeded by: Allan Kittleman

Member of the Howard County Council from the 4th district
- In office December 2002 – December 4, 2006
- Preceded by: Mary Lorsung
- Succeeded by: Mary Kay Sigaty

Personal details
- Born: May 4, 1974 (age 52) Columbia, Maryland, U.S.
- Party: Democratic
- Spouse: Jacqueline Harf (m. 2000)
- Children: 2
- Education: University of Maryland, College Park (BA); Georgetown University (JD)

Kenneth Samuel Ulman (born May 4, 1974) is an American attorney, businessman, and politician who served as the chair of the Maryland Democratic Party from 2023 to 2025. He was the county executive of Howard County, Maryland from 2006 to 2014, and represented the 4th district of the Howard County Council from 2002 to 2006.

Born and raised in Columbia, Maryland, Ulman graduated from the University of Maryland, College Park and Georgetown University. He began his career working in the administration of Maryland governor Parris Glendening and as a campaign aide for the campaigns of Glendening and President Bill Clinton. Ulman was elected to the Howard County Council in 2002, serving for one term before being elected Howard County Executive. During his tenure as county executive, Ulman oversaw the implementation of the Healthy Howard program and supported efforts to spur new development in the county.

Ulman was the Democratic nominee for lieutenant governor of Maryland in the 2014 Maryland gubernatorial election, in which he and Lieutenant Governor Anthony Brown were defeated by Republican businessman Larry Hogan and Boyd Rutherford. Following his defeat, Ulman founded his own consulting company, Margrave Strategies, which oversaw redevelopment initiatives at state universities.

== Early life and education ==
Ulman was born in Columbia, Maryland, on May 4, 1974, to Diana and Louis Jay Ulman, an attorney who was the chair of the Maryland Racing Commission under Governor Parris Glendening. His brother, Doug Ulman, founded the Ulman Cancer Fund for Young Adults and was the CEO of the Livestrong Foundation from 2007 to 2015.

Ulman graduated from Centennial High School and attended the University of Maryland, College Park, where he received a Bachelor of Arts degree in government and politics in 1997 and was a member of the Theta Chi fraternity; and Georgetown University, where he earned a Juris Doctor degree in 2001. He was admitted to the Maryland Bar in June 2001.

== Career ==
=== Early career ===
Ulman first became involved in politics while attending UMD, where he was a student government member and later worked as a western Iowa and Wyoming field director for the Bill Clinton 1996 presidential campaign and Prince George's County executive Parris Glendening's campaign in the 1998 Maryland gubernatorial election. In 1994, he became an intern at the White House. After Glendening took office, Ulman joined his administration as a liaison to the Maryland Board of Public Works and secretary to the Cabinet.

In July 2001, after county councilmember Mary Lorsung announced that she would not run for re-election in 2002, Ulman told The Baltimore Sun that he would run to succeed her. He faced Mary Kay Sigaty in the Democratic primary election, during which Ulman received endorsements from county councilmember Guy Guzzone and county labor unions, and enjoyed a large financial advantage over Sigaty, whom he outspent 5-to-1. Ulman narrowly defeated Sigaty in the primary election in September 2002, edging her out by 36 votes, and defeated Republican nominee Joan Lancos in the general election. After being sworn in, Ulman stepped down from the Hodes, Ulman, Pessin & Katz law firm, which was involved in a school board lawsuit against a citizen's open-meetings lawsuit.

During his tenure, Ulman was described by the Baltimore Sun as a progressive, and was credited with helping pass a bill to ban smoking in bars and restaurants in Howard County. He also introduced bills to ban roadside stands and to provide police with reduced rates for apartments in higher-crime areas, opposed efforts to close the Merriweather Post Pavilion, and supported bills to limit development in communities near overcrowded schools. In July 2003, county Community Action Council director Dorothy Moore accused Ulman of improperly influencing a union election held by Head Start workers by campaigning for Service Employees International Union during voting and through letters distributed to workers. In response, Ulman said that he responded to a union request for help amid an anti-union campaign headed by the CAC, and that he was glad he intervened.

=== Howard County Executive ===
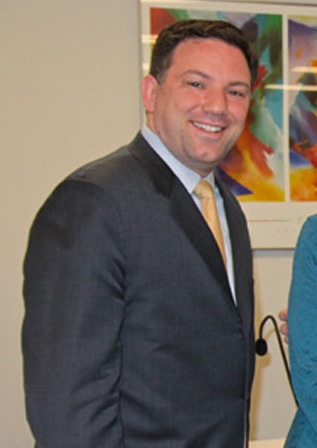
Ulman in 2010

In November 2005, Ulman announced that he would run for Howard County Executive in 2006, seeking to succeed term-limited county executive James N. Robey. He defeated perennial candidate Harry Dunbar in the Democratic primary election and won the general election against Republican county councilmember Christopher Merdon. He was re-elected to second term in 2010, in which he defeated Ehrlich administration official Trent Kittleman with 62.5 percent of the vote.

Ulman was sworn in as Howard County Executive on December 4, 2006. Sworn in at age 32, he is the youngest person to serve as county executive in Maryland history. During his tenure, Ulman helped spur development in Howard County, emphasizing county schools and plans for redevelopment in Columbia that led the county's population to increase by more than 30,000 in eight years, established the Healthy Howard program, and supported efforts to promote environmental sustainability. He received criticism for policies banning sugary drinks and high-calorie snacks on county property and for using county police to transport him to political events, including fundraisers for state legislators and his re-election campaign. In November 2008, Ulman was appointed by National Association of Counties president Don Stapley to serve for one year as the vice chair of the association's Health Steering Committee.

==== Development ====
During his 2006 Howard County executive campaign, Ulman unveiled a development platform that involved citizens in the planning process, including in helping decide the locations of businesses and what roads and sidewalks should be built. He also expressed opposition to Centennial Gardens, a planned 59-unit apartment complex in Font Hill (which Ulman killed shortly after taking office), and support for Columbia redevelopment plans, saying that it would bring about a "more concentrated, but pedestrian-friendly town center", but expressed concerns with plans to develop 5,500 housing units, stores, offices, and a hotel in downtown Columbia. In December 2007, Ulman published a slightly modified version of the county's downtown redevelopment plan that included substantial alterations from the original plan, including an expanded discussion of green technologies and public transit, promoting Howard Community College and Howard County General Hospital, and creating a public square within the downtown area.

In October 2008, Ulman proposed regulations aimed at speeding up the review process for new development projects in Howard County. In March 2014, he introduced a bill to force the Howard Hughes Corporation to relinquish ownership of Merriweather Post Pavilion to the Downtown Columbia Arts and Culture Commission; the bill was scrapped after the Howard County government and the Howard Hughes Corporation announced a five-year renovation plan for the amphitheater.

In December 2012, Ulman issued his first-ever veto to a bill to designate land preservation areas in Howard County, saying that he believed the bill did not go far enough to preserve land in the county.

In April 2014, Ulman supported calls to roll back amendments made to the county's zoning plan that would allow mulching facilities as a conditional use with no space limitations on agriculturally preserved land.

==== Education ====
As county executive, Ulman continually increased funding for the Howard County Public School System, with his final county budget providing the school system with $77.3 million in funding.

In August 2011, Ulman established a commission to explore changing the Howard County Board of Education's structure to promote racial and geographic diversity, and reduce conflicts. The commission finished its study in September, recommending that the school board be restructured to include five elected members and two members appointed by the county executive.

In December 2012, following the Sandy Hook Elementary School shooting, Ulman established a school safety task force to address building security and mental health concerns. In October 2013, he signed executive orders to discourage bullying in county public schools, including a website to anonymously submit reports of bullying.

In May 2014, Ulman unveiled a $2.5 million, county-funded scholarship for students attending Howard Community College.

==== Environment ====
In October 2007, Ulman proposed creating a cabinet-level environmental office to encourage residents and businesses to adopt environmentally sustainable practices. The bill creating the office was signed into law in March 2008.

During Hurricane Sandy in October 2012, a power outage at the Little Patuxent Water Reclamation Plant released 19.5 million gallons of effluent into the Patuxent River. In response, Ulman announced plans to build an $8.1 million electrical protection system to prevent future effluent releases. The electrical system was completed in September 2014.

==== Taxes ====
During his 2006 Howard County executive campaign, Ulman said that he supported decreasing property taxes for people with limited incomes and owned a partial share of their subsidized homes.

In 2007, Ulman proposed a $7.7 million increase in the county's fire property taxes to fund Fire Department projects in western Howard County. In 2012, he proposed a bill to eliminate the county's fire tax districts— creating a single countywide fire tax rate—which was approved by the county council later that year.

In February 2014, Ulman criticized a proposal to cut the statewide corporate tax rate as a "$1.6 billion giveaway".

==== Other positions ====
In January 2007, Ulman lobbied state and federal officials to extend the Metrorail's Green Line to Fort Meade, Maryland, which he argued would help accommodate expected growth amid the Pentagon's plan to reorganize military bases. He also supported efforts to create an interchange connecting U.S. Route 1 and Maryland Route 175. In March 2014, Ulman announced a new transit partnership between Howard and Anne Arundel counties to help operate regional bus routes.

In June 2011, Ulman traveled to Israel on a trip paid for by the Harry and Jeanette Weinberg Foundation. While there, he commented on a heavily criticized speech by President Barack Obama in which he suggested that the 1967 borders of Israel should be the starting point for a peace agreement, saying that he thought Obama "ought to make more clear to our partners in Israel that whatever happens, he won't sacrifice Israel's security".

In July 2012, Ulman helped fundraise for groups supporting 2012 Maryland Question 6, which upheld a state law legalizing same-sex marriage in Maryland.

In December 2012, Ulman signed an executive order banning the sale of high-sugar drinks and high-calorie foods on county property, including schools and libraries.

=== 2014 Maryland gubernatorial election ===
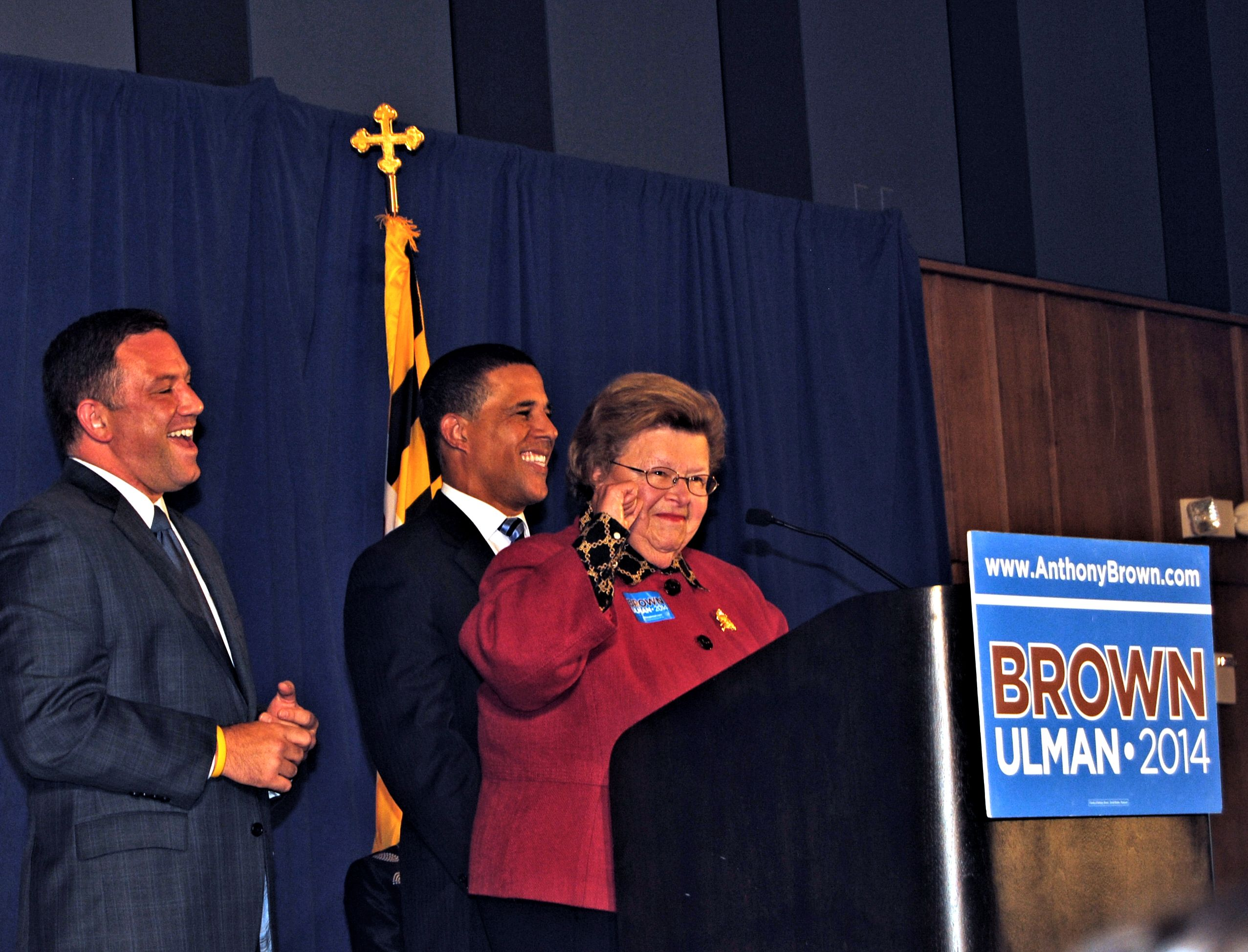
U.S. Senator Barbara Mikulski campaigns with Brown and Ulman, 2013

In November 2011, The Baltimore Sun floated Ulman as a potential candidate in the 2014 Maryland gubernatorial election, citing his continued fundraising following his 2010 election win. By January 2013, Ulman reported having $2.1 million on hand for a potential run for governor. On June 3, 2013, Lieutenant Governor Anthony Brown named Ulman as his running mate in the 2014 gubernatorial election. On the campaign trail, Ulman worked as a fundraising powerhouse for Brown and rallied on fiscal issues, including job creation and economic growth.

Brown and Ulman won the Democratic primary election on June 25, 2014, receiving 51.4 percent of the vote. On November 4, 2014, the Brown-Ulman ticket was defeated by Republican businessman Larry Hogan in the general election in what many considered to be an upset victory.

=== Post-county executive career ===
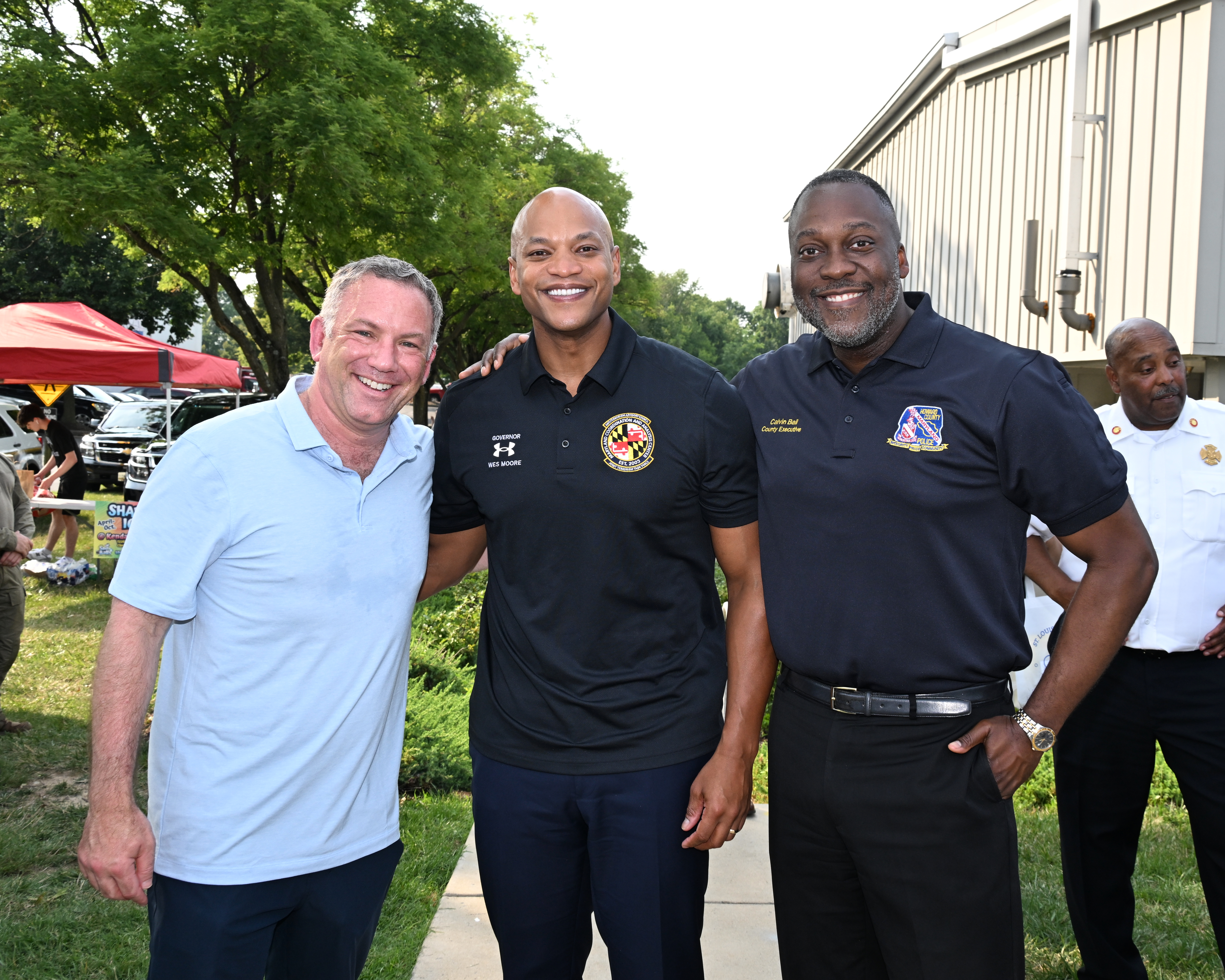
Ulman, Governor Wes Moore, and Howard County Executive Calvin Ball III in 2024

Following the 2014 gubernatorial election, Ulman founded his own consulting company, Margrave Strategies, which was contracted by the University of Maryland, College Park to transform College Park, Maryland into a hub for tech start-ups and incubators. Margrave Strategies was later contracted by Towson University, Salisbury University, and Bowie State University for similar redevelopment initiatives.

In November 2018, Ulman was named to county executive-elect Calvin Ball III's transition team. In October 2020, Ball named Ulman to chair the newly formed HoCo RISE Collaborative, a task force formed to develop recommendations on how Howard County should prioritize its economic development following the COVID-19 pandemic.

In February 2019, Ulman became a partner and investor in Baltimore Fishbowl.

In November 2022, Ulman was named to Governor-elect Wes Moore's transition team. In October 2023, following the retirement of Yvette Lewis, Moore recommended Ulman to succeed her as chair of the Maryland Democratic Party. On November 18, he was overwhelmingly elected as the party's chair and was sworn in by Moore. During his tenure, Ulman campaigned for Angela Alsobrooks in the 2024 United States Senate election in Maryland, against conservative candidates for county-level school board elections, and raised $5.5 million for the state party. On May 21, 2025, he announced that he would step down as chair of the Maryland Democratic Party on June 13, seeking to return full time to Margrave Strategies. First Vice Chair Charlene Dukes served as the acting chair of the Maryland Democratic Party until Steuart Pittman was elected on June 21 with the endorsements of Ulman and Moore.

== Personal life ==
Ulman met his future wife, Jacqueline (née Harf), while attending the University of Maryland, College Park. The couple married in 2000. Together, they have two daughters.

In December 2009, Ulman underwent outpatient back surgery to remove a protruding portion of an intervertebral disc. In April 2010, he underwent surgery to cauterize a ruptured artery in his nose.

== Electoral history ==
Howard County Council District 4 Democratic primary election, 2002
Party	Candidate	Votes	%
Democratic	Kenneth Ulman	3,073	50.3
Democratic	Mary Kay Sigaty	3,037	49.7

Howard County Council District 4 election, 2002
Party	Candidate	Votes	%
Democratic	Kenneth Ulman	11,602	58.4
Republican	Joan C. Lancos	8,260	41.5
Write-in		20	0.1

Howard County Executive Democratic primary election, 2006
Party	Candidate	Votes	%
Democratic	Kenneth Ulman	19,701	78.5
Democratic	Harry M. Dunbar	5,398	21.5

Howard County Executive election, 2006
Party	Candidate	Votes	%
Democratic	Kenneth Ulman	54,022	52.1
Republican	Christopher J. Merdon	44,910	43.3
Independent	C. Stephen Wallis	4,701	4.5

Howard County Executive election, 2010
Party	Candidate	Votes	%
Democratic	Kenneth Ulman (incumbent)	66,121	62.8
Republican	Trent Kittleman	39,066	37.1
Write-in		98	0.1

Maryland gubernatorial Democratic primary election, 2014
Party	Candidate	Votes	%
Democratic	Anthony Brown; Kenneth Ulman	249,398	51.4
Democratic	Doug Gansler; Jolene Ivey	117,383	24.2
Democratic	Heather Mizeur; Delman Coates	104,721	21.6
Democratic	Cindy Walsh; Mary Elizabeth Wingate-Pennacchia	6,863	1.4
Democratic	Charles U. Smith; Clarence Tucker	3,507	0.7
Democratic	Ralph Jaffe; Freda Jaffe	3,221	0.7

Maryland gubernatorial election, 2014
Party	Candidate	Votes	%
Republican	Larry Hogan; Boyd Rutherford	884,400	51.0
Democratic	Anthony Brown; Kenneth Ulman	818,890	47.2
Libertarian	Shawn Quinn; Lorenzo Gaztanaga	25,382	1.5
Write-in		4,505	0.2

Political offices
Preceded by James Robey	Executive of Howard County; 2006–2014	Succeeded by Allan Kittleman
Party political offices
Preceded by Anthony Brown	Democratic nominee for Lieutenant Governor of Maryland; 2014	Succeeded by Susan Turnbull
Preceded by Everett Browning; Acting	Chair of the Maryland Democratic Party; 2023–2025	Succeeded by Charlene Dukes; Acting
