= Maryland Legislative District 9 =

American legislative district

Maryland's legislative district 9
- Represents parts of Howard County and Montgomery County
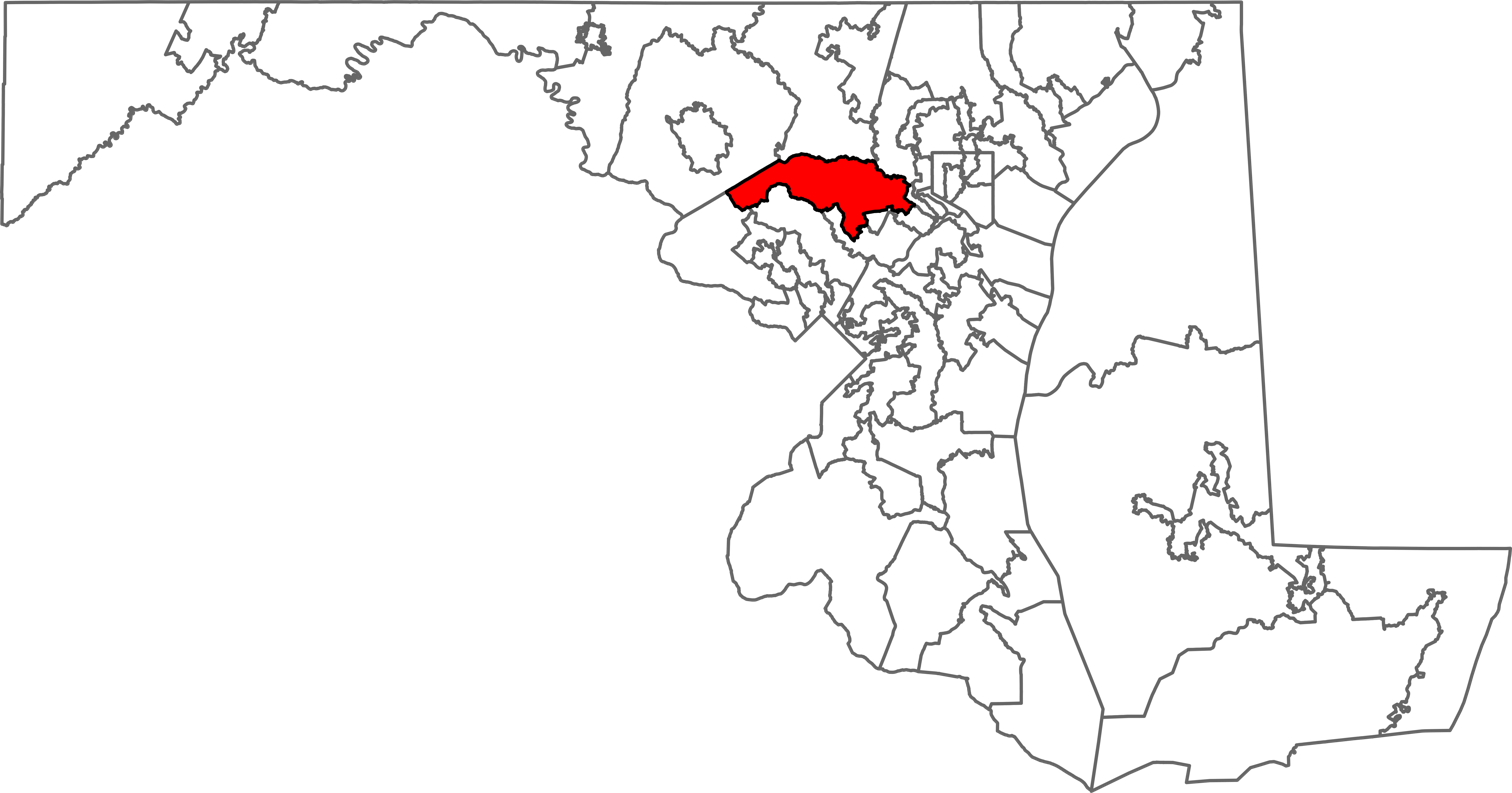
- Senator: Katie Fry Hester (D)
- Delegate(s): Chao Wu (D) (District 9A); Natalie Ziegler (D) (District 9A); M. Courtney Watson (D) (District 9B)
- Registration: 41.0% Democratic; 34.4% Republican; 23.2% unaffiliated
- Demographics: 62.0% White; 7.5% Black/African American; 0.2% Native American; 22.4% Asian; 0% Hawaiian/Pacific Islander; 1.5% Other race; 6.5% Two or more races; 4.2% Hispanic
- Population (2020): 144,375
- Voting-age population: 109,088
- Registered voters: 103,542

Maryland Legislative District 9 is one of 47 districts in the state for the Maryland General Assembly. It covers parts of Montgomery County and Howard County. The district is divided into two sub-districts for the Maryland House of Delegates: District 9A and District 9B.

== Demographic characteristics ==
As of the 2020 United States census, the district had a population of 144,375, of whom 109,088 (75.6%) were of voting age. The racial makeup of the district was 89,543 (62.0%) White, 10,757 (7.5%) African American, 287 (0.2%) Native American, 32,325 (22.4%) Asian, 47 (0.0%) Pacific Islander, 2,105 (1.5%) from some other race, and 9,338 (6.5%) from two or more races. Hispanic or Latino of any race were 6,067 (4.2%) of the population.

The district had 103,542 registered voters as of October 17, 2020, of whom 24,054 (23.2%) were registered as unaffiliated, 35,582 (34.4%) were registered as Republicans, 42,420 (41.0%) were registered as Democrats, and 918 (0.9%) were registered to other parties.

== Political representation ==
The district is represented for the 2023–2027 legislative term in the State Senate by Katie Fry Hester (D) and in the House of Delegates by Chao Wu (D, District 9A), Natalie Ziegler (D, District 9A) and M. Courtney Watson (D, District 9B).

== Election history ==
=== Multi-member Senate district (1967–1975) ===
Years	Senator	Party	Electoral history	Years	Senator	Party	Electoral history
January 2, 1963 – January 8, 1975	J. Joseph Curran Jr.	Democratic	Redistricted from Baltimore City's 3rd district and re-elected in 1966. Re-elected in 1970. Redistricted to the 43rd district.	January 18, 1967 – January 18, 1970	Joseph L. Manning	Democratic	Elected in 1966. Died.
January 2, 1963 – January 8, 1975	J. Joseph Curran Jr.	Democratic	Redistricted from Baltimore City's 3rd district and re-elected in 1966. Re-elected in 1970. Redistricted to the 43rd district.	January 22, 1970 – January 13, 1971	Merle H. Manning	Democratic	Appointed to finish Manning's term. Retired.
January 2, 1963 – January 8, 1975	J. Joseph Curran Jr.	Democratic	Redistricted from Baltimore City's 3rd district and re-elected in 1966. Re-elected in 1970. Redistricted to the 43rd district.	January 13, 1971 – January 8, 1975	John Carroll Byrnes	Democratic	Elected in 1970. Redistricted to the 44th district.

=== Single-member Senate district (1975–present) ===
Years	Senator	Party	Electoral history
January 8, 1975 – January 12, 1983	Norman R. Stone Jr.	Democratic	Redistricted from the 13th district and re-elected in 1974. Re-elected in 1978. Redistricted to the 7th district.
January 12, 1983 – January 13, 1999	F. Vernon Boozer	Republican	Redistricted from the 10th district and elected in 1982. Re-elected in 1986. Re-elected in 1990. Re-elected in 1994. Lost renomination.
January 13, 1999 – January 8, 2003	Andy Harris	Republican	Elected in 1998. Redistricted to the 7th district.
January 8, 2003 – September 11, 2004	Robert H. Kittleman	Republican	Elected in 2002. Died.
October 21, 2004 – December 1, 2014	Allan H. Kittleman	Republican	Appointed to finish Kittleman's term. Elected in 2006. Re-elected in 2010. Retired to run for Howard County Executive.
January 14, 2015 – January 9, 2019	Gail H. Bates	Republican	Elected in 2014. Lost re-election.
January 9, 2019 – present	Katie Fry Hester	Democratic	Elected in 2018. Re-elected in 2022. Re-elected in 2026.
