= Robert Flanagan (politician) =

American politician (born 1945)

Robert L. Flanagan

Member of the Maryland House of Delegates from the 9B district
- In office January 14, 2015 – January 9, 2019
- Preceded by: Susan Krebs
- Succeeded by: Courtney Watson

Secretary of Transportation of Maryland
- In office March 23, 2003 – January 17, 2007 (Acting from March 3, 2003)
- Governor: Bob Ehrlich
- Preceded by: John D. Porcari
- Succeeded by: John D. Porcari

Member of the Maryland House of Delegates from the 9A district
- In office January 8, 2003 – February 28, 2003 Serving with Gail H. Bates
- Preceded by: Martha Scanlan Klima; A. Wade Kach
- Succeeded by: Warren E. Miller

Member of the Maryland House of Delegates from the 14B district
- In office January 14, 1987 – January 8, 2003 Serving with Robert H. Kittleman; Gail H. Bates
- Preceded by: Edward J. Kasemeyer
- Succeeded by: Constituency abolished

Personal details
- Born: November 1, 1945 (age 80) Burlington, Vermont, U.S.
- Party: Republican
- Education: Harvard University (AB); Cornell University (JD)

Robert L. Flanagan (born November 1, 1945) is an American politician who was the Secretary of the Maryland Department of Transportation from 2003 until 2007, under the administration of Governor Robert Ehrlich. Prior and subsequent to this position, Flanagan served in the Maryland House of Delegates. He was first elected to office in 1987 and served with fellow Republican, Robert Kittleman, until 2002, when the districts were redrawn and he would move to District 14B.

== Early life and education ==
Flanagan was born in Burlington, Vermont, the son of Bernard Lawrence Flanagan (1919-1970) and Margaret (Sawyer) Flanagan. When Flanagan was young, his father was employed on the staff of U.S. Senator George Aiken in Washington, D.C.

Flanagan attended Gonzaga College High School in Washington, D.C. After high school he attended Harvard University, where he earned his A.B. in economics in 1967. Flanagan attended Cornell Law School, where he was a member of the Cornell Law Review, Order of Coif and published The Rights of Handicapped Children to an Education 59 Cornell L.R. 519(1974), earning his J.D. in 1974.

His younger brother, Ed Flanagan, also entered politics, but as a Democrat, serving as the Vermont Auditor of Accounts from 1993 - 2001 and in the Vermont Senate from 2005 - 2011.

== Career ==
After college, Flanagan joined the United States Navy and earned the rank of lieutenant. He served aboard the ballistic missile submarine, USS Patrick Henry (SSBN-599), from 1967 until 1971.

After his stint in the navy, Flanagan obtained his J.D. from Cornell Law School. He was admitted to the bar in 1974 and began practicing law. He practiced law for 28 years.

In 1987, Flanagan began his political career by being elected to the Maryland House of Delegates, representing District 14B, which covered parts of Montgomery and Howard Counties. Districts were later redrawn, and Flanagan was elected into his new district of 9A, which was solely in Howard County. As a Republican member in the heavily Democratic House of Delegates, Flanagan served the role as Minority Whip from 1997 until 2001.

Being a Republican in the Maryland General Assembly leaves Flanagan little chance to serve as a chair on any committees. However, Flanagan was able to chair the Howard County Delegation from 1991 until 1996. Moreover, Flanagan was a high-ranking Republican on many committees, such as the Judiciary Committee (1987–1990), the Joint Audit Committee (1987–1992, 1995-2003), the Appropriations Committee (1991-2003), the Legislative Policy Committee (1997-2002), and the Rules and Executive Nominations Committee (1997-2002).

In the 2002 gubernatorial election, Republican Robert Ehrlich defeated Democrat Kathleen Kennedy Townsend to become the first Republican governor of Maryland since Spiro Agnew in 1969. Governor Ehrlich appointed Flanagan to Maryland Secretary of Transportation. In this position, Flanagan managed the Port of Baltimore, Baltimore Washington International Airport, the Maryland Motor Vehicle Administration, the various transportation entities, such as the MARC Train, the Baltimore Light Rail, the Baltimore Subway, and the Maryland Transit Administration.

During Flanagan's tenure as Secretary from 2003 to 2007, Maryland obtained approval under the National Environmental Policy Act to begin construction of the Inter-county connector as a state of the art, congestion managed highway by developing a new environmentally sensitive design after two prior rejections by the EPA in 1983 and 1997. Maryland also began building its first High-occupancy toll lanes on I-95 north of Baltimore; constructed the Southwest Airlines terminal at Baltimore Washington International Airport; and planned and constructed a new cruise ship terminal in Baltimore off of I-95. The Baltimore region's bus routes and fixed transit service were reorganized for people with disabilities, resulting in settlement of a lawsuit by the Maryland Disability Law Center citing long standing deficiencies.

In 2006, Baltimore Mayor, Martin O'Malley, defeated Bob Ehrlich in the gubernatorial election, thus ending Flanagan's tenure as the Secretary of Transportation. Flanagan was replaced by John D. Porcari, who was the Secretary during the administration of the previous governor, Parris Glendening.

From 2007 to 2009, Flanagan was a Senior Vice President with First Southwest Company, advising state and local governments regarding public private partnerships for transportation. He has been a speaker on this topic in various forums including the John F. Kennedy School of Government, Study Group on Transportation Infrastructure. In 2009, Flanagan co-authored "Emerging Trends in Surface Transport Concessions PPPs in the U.S." which was published in Investing in Infrastructure, a comprehensive research source on infrastructure funds, investment techniques, and financing challenges in the world's diverse market by PEI Media Ltd.

Flanagan is a practicing attorney in Columbia, Maryland, focusing on business representation, litigation, government matters, and procurement law.

Flanagan was elected to the Maryland House of Delegates in 2014, representing District 9B. Flanagan serves on the Environment and Transportation Committee.

In November 2018, Flanagan ran for re-election in District 9B and lost to his opponent Courtney Watson (D). Thus ending his long tenure as a public servant in the House of Delegates.

Preceded by Wade Kach & Martha Scanlan Klima	District 9A Delegate; 2002–2003	Succeeded by Warren E. Miller
Preceded by John D. Porcari	Maryland Secretary of Transportation; 2003–2007	Succeeded by John D. Porcari
Preceded by Susan Krebs	District 9B Delegate; 2015–2019	Succeeded by Courtney Watson
