= 2014 Maryland House of Delegates election =

- November 4, 2014

All 141 seats in the Maryland House of Delegates 71 seats needed for a majority
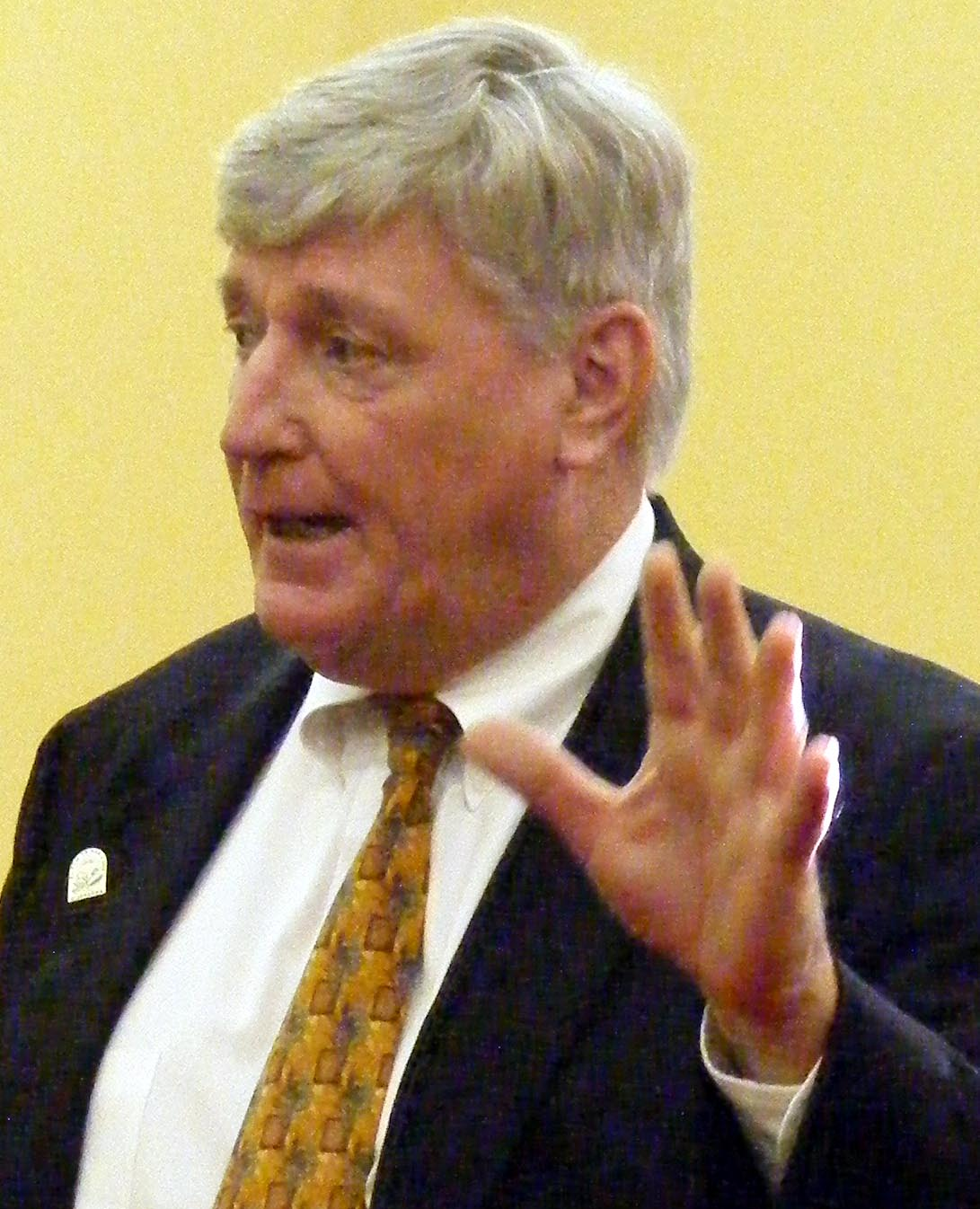

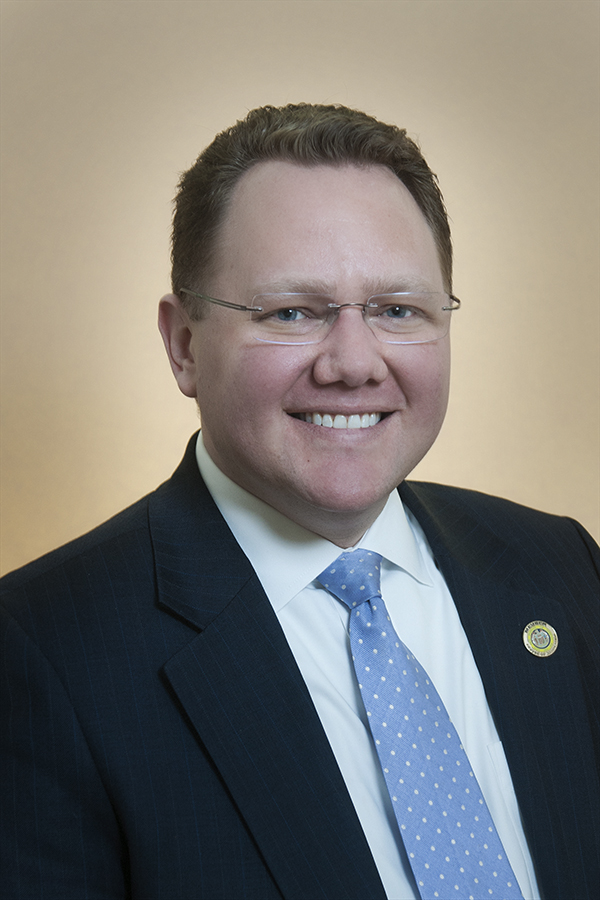
	Majority party	Minority party
Leader	Michael E. Busch	Nic Kipke
Party	Democratic	Republican
Last election	98	43
Seats won	91	50
Seat change	▼7	▲7
- Results: Democratic gain Republican gain Democratic hold Republican hold
Speaker before election
Michael E. Busch
Democratic
Elected Speaker
Michael E. Busch
Democratic

The 2014 Maryland House of Delegates elections were held on November 4, 2014, as part of the biennial United States elections. All 141 of Maryland's state delegates were up for reelection.

== Retiring incumbents ==
=== Democrats ===
1. District 3A: Galen R. Clagett retired.
2. District 6: Joseph J. Minnick retired.
3. District 6: Johnny Olszewski retired to run for state senator in District 6.
4. District 10: Emmett C. Burns Jr. retired.
5. District 10: Shirley Nathan-Pulliam retired to run for state senator in District 44.
6. District 11: Jon Cardin retired to run for attorney general of Maryland.
7. District 12A: Steven J. DeBoy Sr. retired.
8. District 12A: James E. Malone Jr. retired.
9. District 12B: Elizabeth Bobo retired.
10. District 13: Guy Guzzone retired to run for state senator in District 13.
11. District 16: Susan C. Lee retired to run for state senator in District 16.
12. District 17: Luiz R. S. Simmons retired to run for state senator in District 17.
13. District 19: Sam Arora retired.
14. District 20: Heather Mizeur retired to run for governor of Maryland.
15. District 20: Tom Hucker retired to run for the Montgomery County Council.
16. District 23A: James W. Hubbard retired.
17. District 25: Aisha Braveboy retired to run for Attorney General of Maryland.
18. District 25: Melony G. Griffith retired to run for state senator in District 25.
19. District 26: Veronica L. Turner retired to run for state senator in District 26.
20. District 28: Peter Murphy retired to run for President of the Charles County Board of Commissioners.
21. District 29B: John F. Wood Jr. retired.
22. District 32: Mary Ann Love retired.
23. District 34A: Mary-Dulany James retired to run for state senator in District 34.
24. District 37: Rudolph C. Cane retired.
25. District 45: Nina R. Harper retired.
26. District 46: Brian K. McHale retired.
27. District 47: Jolene Ivey retired to run for lieutenant governor of Maryland.
28. District 47: Doyle Niemann retired to run for the Prince George's County Council.

=== Republicans ===
1. District 1C: LeRoy E. Myers Jr. retired to run for Washington County Commissioner.
2. District 3A: Patrick N. Hogan retired.
3. District 3B: Michael Hough retired to run for state senator in District 4.
4. District 9A: Gail H. Bates retired to run for state senator in District 9.
5. District 30: Ron George retired to run for governor of Maryland.
6. District 31: Steve Schuh retired to run for Anne Arundel County Executive.
7. District 33: Robert A. Costa retired.
8. District 35A: H. Wayne Norman Jr. retired to run for state senator in District 35.
9. District 35A: Donna Stifler retired.
10. District 37B: Adelaide C. Eckardt retired to run for state senator in District 37.
11. District 37B: Jeannie Haddaway-Riccio retired to run for lieutenant governor of Maryland.
12. District 42: William J. Frank retired.

== Incumbents defeated ==
=== In primaries ===
==== Democrats ====
1. District 24: Darren Swain lost renomination to Erek Barron, Carolyn J. B. Howard, and Michael L. Vaughn.
2. District 40: Shawn Z. Tarrant lost renomination to Antonio Hayes, Frank M. Conaway Jr., and Barbara A. Robinson.
3. District 44A: Melvin L. Stukes lost renomination to Keith E. Haynes.
4. District 44A: Keiffer Mitchell Jr. lost renomination to Keith E. Haynes.
5. District 47: Michael G. Summers lost renomination to Diana M. Fennell.

==== Republicans ====
1. District 4B: Donald B. Elliott lost renomination to Haven Shoemaker, Justin Ready, and Susan W. Krebs.
2. District 31: Don H. Dwyer Jr. lost renomination to Meagan Simonaire.
3. District 36: Michael D. Smigiel Sr. lost renomination to Jefferson L. Ghrist, Jay Jacobs, and Steven J. Arentz.
4. District 42B: Joseph C. Boteler III lost renomination to Susan L. M. Aumann and Chris West.

=== In the general election ===
==== Democrats ====
1. District 1B: Kevin Kelly lost to Jason C. Buckel.
2. District 2B: John P. Donoghue lost to Brett Wilson.
3. District 6: Michael H. Weir Jr. lost to Robin Grammer Jr., Robert B. Long, and Ric Metzgar.
4. District 29B: John L. Bohanan Jr. lost to Deb Rey.
5. District 34B: David D. Rudolph lost to Kevin Hornberger.
6. District 38B: Norman Conway lost to Carl Anderton Jr.

== Predictions ==
Source	Ranking	As of
Governing	Safe D	October 20, 2014

== List of districts ==
All election results are from the Maryland State Board of Elections.

=== District 1A ===
Maryland House of Delegates District 1A election, 2014
Party	Candidate	Votes	%
Republican	Wendell R. Beitzel (incumbent)	10,637	99.1
Write-in		100	0.9
Republican hold			

=== District 1B ===
Maryland House of Delegates District 1B election, 2014
Party	Candidate	Votes	%
Republican	Jason C. Buckel	6,664	58.9
Democratic	Kevin Kelly (incumbent)	4,623	40.9
Write-in		21	0.2
Republican gain from Democratic			

=== District 1C ===
Maryland House of Delegates District 1C Republican primary election, 2014
Party	Candidate	Votes	%
Republican	Mike McKay	1,568	56.2
Republican	Ray Givens	1,222	43.8

Maryland House of Delegates District 1C election, 2014
Party	Candidate	Votes	%
Republican	Mike McKay	6,388	57.0
Democratic	Nick Scarpelli	4,809	42.9
Write-in		9	0.1
Republican hold			

=== District 2A ===
Maryland House of Delegates District 2A Republican primary election, 2014
Party	Candidate	Votes	%
Republican	Neil Parrott	5,362	45.8
Republican	Andrew A. Serafini (incumbent)	5,178	44.2
Republican	David C. Hanlin	1,180	10.1

Maryland House of Delegates District 2A election, 2014
Party	Candidate	Votes	%
Republican	Neil C. Parrott	17,599	36.0
Republican	Andrew A. Serafini (incumbent)	17,528	35.9
Democratic	Elizabeth Paul	8,279	16.9
Democratic	Charles Bailey	5,419	11.1
Write-in		22	0.0
Republican hold			
Republican hold			

=== District 2B ===
Maryland House of Delegates District 2B election, 2014
Party	Candidate	Votes	%
Republican	Brett Wilson	3,846	54.3
Democratic	John P. Donoghue (incumbent)	3,232	45.6
Write-in		7	0.1
Republican gain from Democratic			

=== District 3A ===
Maryland House of Delegates District 3A Democratic primary election, 2014
Party	Candidate	Votes	%
Democratic	Carol L. Krimm	3,087	36.3
Democratic	Karen Lewis Young	2,938	34.5
Democratic	Roger Wilson	1,938	22.8
Democratic	Nicholas Bouquet	549	6.4

Maryland House of Delegates District 3A election, 2014
Party	Candidate	Votes	%
Democratic	Carol L. Krimm	11,654	28.0
Democratic	Karen Lewis Young	10,944	26.3
Republican	Paul Smith	9,930	23.9
Republican	Victoria Wilkins	8,981	21.6
Write-in		47	0.1
Democratic gain from Republican			
Democratic hold			

=== District 3B ===
Maryland House of Delegates District 3B election, 2014
Party	Candidate	Votes	%
Republican	William Folden	1,566	54.0
Republican	Darren Shay Wigfield	1,334	46.0

Maryland House of Delegates District 3B election, 2014
Party	Candidate	Votes	%
Republican	William Folden	7,522	56.3
Democratic	Stephen Slater	5,818	43.6
Write-in		18	0.1
Republican hold			

=== District 4 ===
Maryland House of Delegates District 4 Republican primary election, 2014
Party	Candidate	Votes	%
Republican	Kathy Afzali (incumbent)	9,440	27.4
Republican	Kelly M. Schulz (incumbent)	8,274	24.0
Republican	David E. Vogt III	6,499	18.9
Republican	Wendi W. Peters	5,417	15.7
Republican	Barrie Ciliberti	4,816	14.0

Maryland House of Delegates District 4 election, 2014
Party	Candidate	Votes	%
Republican	Kelly Schulz (incumbent)	33,753	31.0
Republican	Kathy Afzali (incumbent)	31,128	28.5
Republican	David E. Vogt, III	27,313	25.1
Democratic	Gene Stanton	16,493	15.1
Write-in		346	0.3
Republican hold			
Republican hold			
Republican hold			

=== District 5 ===
Maryland House of Delegates District 5 Republican primary election, 2014
Party	Candidate	Votes	%
Republican	Justin Ready (incumbent)	10,567	25.0
Republican	Susan Krebs (incumbent)	7,665	18.1
Republican	Haven Shoemaker	7,308	17.3
Republican	Joshua Stonko	5,813	13.8
Republican	Donald B. Elliott (incumbent)	4,064	9.6
Republican	Kevin R. Utz	4,024	9.5
Republican	Carmen Amedori	2,819	6.7

Maryland House of Delegates District 5 election, 2014
Party	Candidate	Votes	%
Republican	Susan Krebs (incumbent)	35,701	28.6
Republican	Justin Ready (incumbent)	34,789	27.9
Republican	Haven Shoemaker	33,985	27.2
Democratic	Dorothy G. Scanlan	11,737	9.4
Democratic	Zachary Hands	8,210	6.6
Write-in		351	0.3
Republican hold			
Republican hold			
Republican hold			

=== District 6 ===
Maryland House of Delegates District 6 Democratic primary election, 2014
Party	Candidate	Votes	%
Democratic	Michael H. Weir Jr. (incumbent)	4,282	19.3
Democratic	Nicholas C. D'Adamo, Jr.	3,525	15.9
Democratic	Jake Mohorovic	2,900	13.1
Democratic	Ed Crizer	2,785	12.5
Democratic	Anna Pearce	2,591	11.7
Democratic	Eric Washington	1,955	8.8
Democratic	Rick Roberts	1,429	6.4
Democratic	Larry Harmel	1,168	5.3
Democratic	Steven Charles Brown	589	2.7
Democratic	Jonathan H. Campbell	577	2.6
Democratic	Marcus A. Foreman	396	1.8

Maryland House of Delegates District 6 Republican primary election, 2014
Party	Candidate	Votes	%
Republican	Robert B. Long	2,139	24.4
Republican	Ric Metzgar	1,707	19.5
Republican	Robin Grammer Jr.	1,224	14.0
Republican	Roger Zajdel	994	11.3
Republican	Domenico "Dan" Liberatore	860	9.8
Republican	Mitchell J. Toland, Jr.	701	8.0
Republican	Carl H. Magee, Jr.	577	6.6
Republican	Gary Sparks	450	5.1
Republican	Jerzy Samotyj	122	1.4

Maryland House of Delegates District 6 election, 2014
Party	Candidate	Votes	%
Republican	Robert B. Long	16,796	21.2
Republican	Ric Metzgar	15,176	19.1
Republican	Robin Grammer Jr.	14,582	18.4
Democratic	Nicholas C. D'Adamo, Jr.	11,599	14.6
Democratic	Mike Weir, Jr. (incumbent)	11,503	14.5
Democratic	Jake Mohorovic	9,526	12.0
Write-in		97	0.1
Republican gain from Democratic			
Republican gain from Democratic			
Republican gain from Democratic			

=== District 7 ===
Maryland House of Delegates District 7 Republican primary election, 2014
Party	Candidate	Votes	%
Republican	Pat McDonough (incumbent)	6,971	29.0
Republican	Kathy Szeliga (incumbent)	6,125	25.5
Republican	Richard Impallaria (incumbent)	5,790	24.1
Republican	David Seman	3,483	14.5
Republican	Tina Sutherland	1,675	7.0

Maryland House of Delegates District 7 election, 2014
Party	Candidate	Votes	%
Republican	Pat McDonough (incumbent)	35,627	26.9
Republican	Kathy Szeliga (incumbent)	33,197	25.0
Republican	Rick Impallaria (incumbent)	32,560	24.6
Democratic	Bob Bowie, Jr.	11,154	8.4
Democratic	Norman Gifford, Jr.	10,192	7.7
Democratic	Pete Definbaugh	9,707	7.3
Write-in		145	0.1
Republican hold			
Republican hold			
Republican hold			

=== District 8 ===
Maryland House of Delegates District 8 Democratic primary election, 2014
Party	Candidate	Votes	%
Democratic	Eric Bromwell (incumbent)	5,601	22.8
Democratic	Renee Smith	4,632	18.9
Democratic	Bill Paulshock	4,512	18.4
Democratic	Harry Bhandari	3,828	15.6
Democratic	Debbie Schillinger	3,124	12.7
Democratic	Steve Verch	1,752	7.1
Democratic	Kyle Arndreas Williams	1,114	4.5

Maryland House of Delegates District 8 election, 2014
Party	Candidate	Votes	%
Republican	Christian Miele	20,164	19.4
Republican	John W. E. Cluster Jr. (incumbent)	19,938	19.2
Democratic	Eric Bromwell (incumbent)	17,361	16.7
Democratic	Bill Paulshock	15,899	15.3
Republican	Norma Secoura	15,660	15.1
Democratic	Renee Smith	14,704	14.2
Write-in		87	0.1
Democratic hold			
Republican hold			
Republican hold			

=== District 9A ===
Maryland House of Delegates District 9A Republican primary election, 2014
Party	Candidate	Votes	%
Republican	Warren E. Miller (incumbent)	3,354	29.2
Republican	Trent Kittleman	2,574	22.4
Republican	Frank Mirabile	2,509	21.8
Republican	Kyle Lorton	1,620	14.1
Republican	Christopher Bouchat	1,426	12.4

Maryland House of Delegates District 9A election, 2014
Party	Candidate	Votes	%
Republican	Trent Kittleman	24,371	37.5
Republican	Warren E. Miller (incumbent)	21,553	33.1
Democratic	Walter E. Carson	10,144	15.6
Democratic	James Ward Morrow	8,906	13.7
Write-in		99	0.2
Republican hold			
Republican hold			

=== District 9B ===
Maryland House of Delegates District 9B Republican primary election, 2014
Party	Candidate	Votes	%
Republican	Robert Flanagan	1,069	56.3
Republican	Carol Loveless	831	43.7

Maryland House of Delegates District 9B Democratic primary election, 2014
Party	Candidate	Votes	%
Democratic	Tom Coale	2,054	62.1
Democratic	Rich Corkran	1,254	37.9

Maryland House of Delegates District 9B election, 2014
Party	Candidate	Votes	%
Republican	Bob Flanagan	8,202	54.9
Democratic	Tom Coale	6,736	45.1
Write-in		12	0.1
Republican hold			

=== District 10 ===
Maryland House of Delegates District 10 Democratic primary election, 2014
Party	Candidate	Votes	%
Democratic	Adrienne A. Jones (incumbent)	8,995	25.4
Democratic	Jay Jalisi	6,146	17.4
Democratic	Benjamin Brooks	5,507	15.6
Democratic	Carin Smith	5,197	14.7
Democratic	Robert "Rob" Johnson	3,369	9.5
Democratic	Chris Blake	2,085	5.9
Democratic	Michael Tyrone Brown, Sr.	1,868	5.3
Democratic	Regg J. Hatcher, Jr.	1,121	3.2
Democratic	Frederick Strickland	1,104	3.1

Maryland House of Delegates District 10 election, 2014
Party	Candidate	Votes	%
Democratic	Adrienne A. Jones (incumbent)	24,104	29.6
Democratic	Benjamin Brooks	23,703	29.1
Democratic	Jay Jalisi	23,339	28.7
Republican	William T. Newton	9,906	12.2
Write-in		348	0.4
Democratic hold			
Democratic hold			
Democratic hold			

=== District 11 ===
Maryland House of Delegates District 11 Democratic primary election, 2014
Party	Candidate	Votes	%
Democratic	Shelly L. Hettleman	9,923	26.4
Democratic	Dana Stein (incumbent)	9,221	24.5
Democratic	Dan K. Morhaim (incumbent)	9,049	24.1
Democratic	Theodore Levin	3,998	10.6
Democratic	Don Engel	3,982	10.6
Democratic	Alex B. Leikus	1,434	3.8

Maryland House of Delegates District 11 election, 2014
Party	Candidate	Votes	%
Democratic	Shelly Hettleman	24,197	27.6
Democratic	Dana Stein	23,241	26.5
Democratic	Dan Morhaim	22,991	26.2
Republican	Laura Harkins	16,947	19.3
Write-in		308	0.4
Democratic hold			
Democratic hold			
Democratic hold			

=== District 12 ===
Maryland House of Delegates District 12 Democratic primary election, 2014
Party	Candidate	Votes	%
Democratic	Clarence Lam	6,307	21.3
Democratic	Terri L. Hill	6,059	20.5
Democratic	Eric Ebersole	4,427	14.9
Democratic	Rebecca P. Dongarra	3,782	12.8
Democratic	Nick Stewart	2,991	10.1
Democratic	Renee McGuirk-Spence	1,908	6.4
Democratic	Brian S. Bailey	1,576	5.3
Democratic	Michael Gisriel	1,246	4.2
Democratic	Adam Sachs	747	2.5
Democratic	Jay Fred Cohen	580	2.0

Maryland House of Delegates District 12 election, 2014
Party	Candidate	Votes	%
Democratic	Eric Ebersole	19,274	18.9
Democratic	Terri L. Hill	19,236	18.9
Democratic	Clarence Lam	18,568	18.2
Republican	Joseph D."Joe" Hooe	16,171	15.9
Republican	Rick Martel	14,290	14.0
Republican	Gordon Bull	14,146	13.9
Write-in		110	0.1
Democratic hold			
Democratic hold			
Democratic hold			

=== District 13 ===
Maryland House of Delegates District 13 Democratic primary election, 2014
Party	Candidate	Votes	%
Democratic	Vanessa Atterbeary	7,399	27.3
Democratic	Shane Pendergrass (incumbent)	7,364	27.1
Democratic	Frank S. Turner (incumbent)	6,941	25.6
Democratic	Nayab Siddiqui	4,204	15.5
Democratic	Fred Eiland	1,225	4.5

Maryland House of Delegates District 13 election, 2014
Party	Candidate	Votes	%
Democratic	Shane Pendergrass	23,167	20.8
Democratic	Vanessa Atterbeary	22,626	20.4
Democratic	Frank S. Turner	22,169	20.0
Republican	Chris Yates	14,598	13.1
Republican	Danny Eaton	14,434	13.0
Republican	Jimmy Williams	14,031	12.6
Write-in		94	0.1
Democratic hold			
Democratic hold			
Democratic hold			

=== District 14 ===
Maryland House of Delegates District 14 Democratic primary election, 2014
Party	Candidate	Votes	%
Democratic	Anne Kaiser (incumbent)	8,335	32.5
Democratic	Craig Zucker (incumbent)	7,922	30.9
Democratic	Eric Luedtke (incumbent)	6,647	25.9
Democratic	Valerie A. Nia Shell	2,763	10.8

Maryland House of Delegates District 14 election, 2014
Party	Candidate	Votes	%
Democratic	Anne Kaiser (incumbent)	21,988	20.2
Democratic	Craig Zucker (incumbent)	20,917	19.3
Democratic	Eric Luedtke (incumbent)	20,012	18.4
Republican	Patricia Fenati	15,392	14.2
Republican	Sharon Trexler Begosh	15,096	13.9
Republican	Michael A. Ostroff	15,086	13.9
Write-in		114	0.1
Democratic hold			
Democratic hold			
Democratic hold			

=== District 15 ===
Maryland House of Delegates District 15 Democratic primary election, 2014
Party	Candidate	Votes	%
Democratic	Kathleen Dumais (incumbent)	6,156	30.6
Democratic	Aruna Miller (incumbent)	5,748	28.6
Democratic	David Fraser-Hidalgo (incumbent)	4,447	22.1
Democratic	Bennett Rushkoff	3,754	18.7

Maryland House of Delegates District 15 election, 2014
Party	Candidate	Votes	%
Democratic	Kathleen Dumais (incumbent)	19,083	20.6
Democratic	Aruna Miller (incumbent)	18,071	19.5
Democratic	David Fraser-Hidalgo (incumbent)	17,324	18.7
Republican	Ed Edmundson	12,913	13.9
Republican	Christine Thron	12,825	13.8
Republican	Flynn Ficker	12,355	13.3
Write-in		86	0.1
Democratic hold			
Democratic hold			
Democratic hold			

=== District 16 ===
Maryland House of Delegates District 16 Democratic primary election, 2014
Party	Candidate	Votes	%
Democratic	Ariana Kelly (incumbent)	10,045	25.6
Democratic	William Frick (incumbent)	9,088	23.2
Democratic	Marc Korman	8,554	21.8
Democratic	Hrant Jamgochian	6,005	15.3
Democratic	Jordan P. Cooper	2,834	7.2
Democratic	Peter Dennis	1,175	3.0
Democratic	Karen Kuker-Kihl	809	2.1
Democratic	Gareth E. Murray	683	1.7

Maryland House of Delegates District 16 election, 2014
Party	Candidate	Votes	%
Democratic	William Frick (incumbent)	26,727	23.0
Democratic	Marc Korman	25,755	22.1
Democratic	Ariana Kelly (incumbent)	25,148	21.6
Republican	Rose Maria Li	15,441	13.3
Republican	John Andrews	11,822	10.2
Republican	Lynda del Castillo	11,453	9.8
Democratic	Kevin Walling (Note: Walling withdrew from the election in February 2014.)	0	0
Write-in		111	0.1
Democratic hold			
Democratic hold			
Democratic hold			

=== District 17 ===
Maryland House of Delegates District 17 Democratic primary election, 2014
Party	Candidate	Votes	%
Democratic	Kumar Barve (incumbent)	5,749	25.4
Democratic	James W. Gilchrist (incumbent)	4,599	20.3
Democratic	Andrew Platt	4,596	20.3
Democratic	Susan Hoffmann	4,509	19.9
Democratic	Laurie-Anne Sayles	2,409	10.6
Democratic	George Zamora	798	3.5

Maryland House of Delegates District 17 election, 2014
Party	Candidate	Votes	%
Democratic	James W. Gilchrist (incumbent)	19,517	33.6
Democratic	Kumar Barve (incumbent)	19,295	33.2
Democratic	Andrew Platt	18,725	32.2
Write-in		588	1.0
Democratic hold			
Democratic hold			
Democratic hold			

=== District 18 ===
Maryland House of Delegates District 18 Democratic primary election, 2014
Party	Candidate	Votes	%
Democratic	Jeff Waldstreicher (incumbent)	7,303	21.6
Democratic	Ana Sol Gutierrez (incumbent)	7,181	21.3
Democratic	Alfred C. Carr Jr. (incumbent)	6,437	19.1
Democratic	Emily Shetty	3,859	11.4
Democratic	Rick Kessler	3,818	11.3
Democratic	Natali Fani-Gonzalez	2,758	8.2
Democratic	Elizabeth Matory	2,389	7.1

Maryland House of Delegates District 18 election, 2014
Party	Candidate	Votes	%
Democratic	Ana Sol Gutierrez (incumbent)	23,406	33.3
Democratic	Al Carr (incumbent)	23,353	33.2
Democratic	Jeff Waldstreicher (incumbent)	22,736	32.3
Write-in		868	1.2
Democratic hold			
Democratic hold			
Democratic hold			

=== District 19 ===
Maryland House of Delegates District 19 Democratic primary election, 2014
Party	Candidate	Votes	%
Democratic	Benjamin F. Kramer (incumbent)	8,196	28.5
Democratic	Bonnie Cullison (incumbent)	6,279	21.8
Democratic	Maricé Morales	4,894	17.0
Democratic	Charlotte Crutchfield	4,512	15.7
Democratic	Paul Bardack	3,679	12.8
Democratic	Melodye A. Berry	1,238	4.3

Maryland House of Delegates District 19 election, 2014
Party	Candidate	Votes	%
Democratic	Ben Kramer (incumbent)	22,238	29.0
Democratic	Bonnie Cullison (incumbent)	21,394	27.9
Democratic	Maricé Morales	20,104	26.2
Republican	Martha Schaerr	12,622	16.5
Write-in		336	0.4
Democratic hold			
Democratic hold			
Democratic hold			

=== District 20 ===
Maryland House of Delegates District 20 Democratic election, 2014
Party	Candidate	Votes	%
Democratic	Sheila E. Hixson (incumbent)	9,135	24.5
Democratic	David Moon	6,959	18.7
Democratic	Will Smith	6,006	16.1
Democratic	Will Jawando	5,620	15.1
Democratic	Darian Unger	4,296	11.5
Democratic	Jonathan Shurberg	2,997	8.0
Democratic	Justin W. Chappell	1,076	2.9
Democratic	D'Juan Hopewell	778	2.1
Democratic	George Zokle	397	1.1

Maryland House of Delegates District 20 election, 2014
Party	Candidate	Votes	%
Democratic	Sheila E. Hixson (incumbent)	23,519	31.6
Democratic	Will Smith	21,989	29.6
Democratic	David Moon	21,646	29.1
Green	Daniel S. Robinson	6,801	9.1
Write-in		407	0.5
Democratic hold			
Democratic hold			
Democratic hold			

=== District 21 ===
Maryland House of Delegates District 21 election, 2014
Party	Candidate	Votes	%
Democratic	Barbara A. Frush (incumbent)	18,157	28.7
Democratic	Ben Barnes (incumbent)	17,235	27.3
Democratic	Joseline Peña-Melnyk (incumbent)	16,880	26.7
Republican	Katherine M. Butcher	10,610	16.8
Write-in		284	0.4
Democratic hold			
Democratic hold			
Democratic hold			

=== District 22 ===
Maryland House of Delegates District 22 Democratic primary election, 2014
Party	Candidate	Votes	%
Democratic	Alonzo T. Washington (incumbent)	7,504	31.6
Democratic	Tawanna P. Gaines (incumbent)	6,284	26.5
Democratic	Anne Healey (incumbent)	6,117	25.8
Democratic	Rushern Baker IV	3,840	16.2

Maryland House of Delegates District 22 election, 2014
Party	Candidate	Votes	%
Democratic	Tawanna P. Gaines (incumbent)	19,174	31.9
Democratic	Alonzo T. Washington (incumbent)	18,677	31.1
Democratic	Anne Healey (incumbent)	18,214	30.3
Republican	Lynn White	3,910	6.5
Write-in		140	0.2
Democratic hold			
Democratic hold			
Democratic hold			

=== District 23A ===
Maryland House of Delegates District 23A election, 2014
Party	Candidate	Votes	%
Democratic	Geraldine Valentino-Smith (incumbent)	7,666	72.5
Independent	Shukoor Ahmed	2,869	27.1
Write-in		45	0.4
Democratic hold			

=== District 23B ===
Maryland House of Delegates District 23B Democratic party election, 2014
Party	Candidate	Votes	%
Democratic	Marvin E. Holmes Jr. (incumbent)	6,323	32.8
Democratic	Joseph F. Vallario Jr. (incumbent)	5,284	27.4
Democratic	Ron Watson	4,357	22.6
Democratic	Thea Wilson	2,801	14.5
Democratic	Reginald Tyer, Jr.	524	2.7

Maryland House of Delegates District 23B election, 2014
Party	Candidate	Votes	%
Democratic	Marvin E. Holmes, Jr. (incumbent)	22,518	47.5
Democratic	Joseph F. Vallario, Jr. (incumbent)	19,274	40.6
Republican	Mike Hethmon	5,494	11.6
Write-in		142	0.3
Democratic hold			
Democratic hold			

=== District 24 ===
Maryland House of Delegates District 24 election, 2014
Party	Candidate	Votes	%
Democratic	Carolyn J. B. Howard (incumbent)	7,864	22.0
Democratic	Michael L. Vaughn (incumbent)	6,880	19.3
Democratic	Erek Barron	4,849	13.6
Democratic	Tiffany T. Alston	4,628	13.0
Democratic	Marva Jo Camp	3,691	10.3
Democratic	Greg Hall	3,031	8.5
Democratic	Darren Swain (incumbent)	2,520	7.1
Democratic	Phillip A. Raines	1,100	3.1
Democratic	Delaneo L. Miller	683	1.9
Democratic	Durand Adrian Ford	423	1.2

Maryland House of Delegates District 24 election, 2014
Party	Candidate	Votes	%
Democratic	Carolyn J. B. Howard (incumbent)	25,869	34.1
Democratic	Michael L. Vaughn (incumbent)	23,772	31.3
Democratic	Erek Barron	23,450	30.9
Republican	Cy Okoro	2,737	3.6
Write-in		116	0.2
Democratic hold			
Democratic hold			
Democratic hold			

=== District 25 ===
Maryland House of Delegates District 25 Democratic primary election, 2014
Party	Candidate	Votes	%
Democratic	Dereck E. Davis (incumbent)	9,088	25.7
Democratic	Angela Angel	7,104	20.1
Democratic	Darryl Barnes	5,702	16.1
Democratic	Juanita D. Miller	3,804	10.8
Democratic	Nick Charles	3,032	8.6
Democratic	Matthew Fogg	1,713	4.8
Democratic	Tony Jones	1,498	4.2
Democratic	Geraldine Gerry Eggleston	1,299	3.7
Democratic	Larry R. Greenhill	1,094	3.1
Democratic	Stanley Onye	1,014	2.9

Maryland House of Delegates District 25 election, 2014
Party	Candidate	Votes	%
Democratic	Angela Angel	26,792	36.2
Democratic	Dereck E. Davis (incumbent)	23,593	31.9
Democratic	Darryl Barnes	23,372	31.6
Write-in		161	0.2
Democratic hold			
Democratic hold			
Democratic hold			

=== District 26 ===
Maryland House of Delegates District 26 Democratic primary election, 2014
Party	Candidate	Votes	%
Democratic	Jay Walker	9,428	24.3
Democratic	Kris Valderrama (incumbent)	8,217	21.2
Democratic	Tony Knotts	8,129	21.0
Democratic	Tamara Davis Brown	5,698	14.7
Democratic	David Sloan	2,782	7.2
Democratic	Xavier A. Aragona	1,692	4.4
Democratic	Keith L. Gray	1,359	3.5
Democratic	Vernon O. Holmes, Jr.	877	2.3
Democratic	Leonard C. "Len" Hopkins, Sr.	585	1.5

Maryland House of Delegates District 26 election, 2014
Party	Candidate	Votes	%
Democratic	Tony Knotts (incumbent)	27,487	35.2
Democratic	Jay Walker (incumbent)	25,434	32.6
Democratic	Kris Valderrama (incumbent)	24,821	31.8
Write-in		287	0.4
Democratic hold			
Democratic hold			
Democratic hold			

=== District 27A ===
Maryland House of Delegates District 27A election, 2014
Party	Candidate	Votes	%
Democratic	James E. Proctor Jr.	10,374	73.7
Republican	Joe Crawford	3,685	26.2
Write-in		21	0.1
Democratic hold			

=== District 27B ===
Maryland House of Delegates District 27B Democratic primary election, 2014
Party	Candidate	Votes	%
Democratic	Michael A. Jackson	2,520	67.9
Democratic	LaRhonda R. Owens	747	20.1
Democratic	Jacqueline Steele McCall	443	11.9

Maryland House of Delegates District 27B election, 2014
Party	Candidate	Votes	%
Democratic	Michael A. Jackson	8,434	52.4
Republican	Philip A. Parenti	7,637	47.5
Write-in		23	0.1
Democratic hold			

=== District 27C ===
Maryland House of Delegates District 27C election, 2014
Party	Candidate	Votes	%
Republican	Mark N. Fisher (incumbent)	9,019	58.1
Democratic	Sue Kullen	6,489	41.8
Write-in		12	0.1
Republican hold			

=== District 28 ===
Maryland House of Delegates District 28 Democratic primary election, 2014
Party	Candidate	Votes	%
Democratic	C. T. Wilson (incumbent)	8,302	25.9
Democratic	Sally Y. Jameson (incumbent)	7,249	22.6
Democratic	Edith J. Patterson	6,644	20.7
Democratic	Candice Quinn Kelly	5,966	18.6
Democratic	John Coller	3,913	12.2

Maryland House of Delegates District 28 election, 2014
Party	Candidate	Votes	%
Democratic	Sally Y. Jameson (incumbent)	25,811	28.7
Democratic	C. T. Wilson (incumbent)	24,202	26.9
Democratic	Edith J. Patterson	21,421	23.8
Republican	Jim Crawford	17,312	19.2
Write-in		1,332	1.5
Democratic hold			
Democratic hold			
Democratic hold			

=== District 29A ===
Maryland House of Delegates District 29A Republican primary election, 2014
Party	Candidate	Votes	%
Republican	Matt Morgan	1,299	45.4
Republican	Bryan "Puff" Barthelme	845	29.5
Republican	Thomas Tommy McKay	718	25.1

Maryland House of Delegates District 29A election, 2014
Party	Candidate	Votes	%
Republican	Matt Morgan	8,948	64.8
Democratic	Daniel A.M. Slade	4,840	35.1
Write-in		13	0.1
Republican gain from Democratic			

=== District 29B ===
Maryland House of Delegates District 29B election, 2014
Party	Candidate	Votes	%
Republican	Deb Rey	5,334	50.3
Democratic	John L. Bohanan Jr. (incumbent)	5,258	49.6
Write-in		10	0.1
Republican gain from Democratic			

=== District 29C ===
Maryland House of Delegates District 29C election, 2014
Party	Candidate	Votes	%
Republican	Tony O'Donnell (incumbent)	9,924	68.5
Democratic	Len Zuza	4,548	31.4
Write-in		19	0.1
Republican hold			

=== District 30A ===
Maryland House of Delegates District 30A Democratic primary election, 2014
Party	Candidate	Votes	%
Democratic	Michael E. Busch (incumbent)	5,255	39.0
Democratic	Chuck Ferrar	2,854	21.2
Democratic	Maria Triandos	1,864	13.8
Democratic	Cheryl Miller	1,779	13.2
Democratic	Laurie Sears Deppa	794	5.9
Democratic	Ridg Mills	690	5.1
Democratic	Gordon Smith	227	1.7

Maryland House of Delegates District 30A election, 2014
Party	Candidate	Votes	%
Republican	Herbert H. McMillan (incumbent)	14,484	27.9
Democratic	Michael E. Busch (incumbent)	14,289	27.6
Democratic	Chuck Ferrar	11,932	23.0
Republican	Genevieve Lindner	11,100	21.4
Write-in		56	0.1
Republican hold			
Democratic hold			

=== District 30B ===
Maryland House of Delegates District 30B Republican primary election, 2014
Party	Candidate	Votes	%
Republican	Seth A. Howard	1,398	52.1
Republican	Jim Fredericks	1,283	47.9

Maryland House of Delegates District 30B Democratic primary election, 2014
Party	Candidate	Votes	%
Democratic	Mitchelle Stephenson	1,389	62.3
Democratic	Michael J. Mcnelly	841	37.7

Maryland House of Delegates District 30B election, 2014
Party	Candidate	Votes	%
Republican	Seth Howard	9,496	63.3
Democratic	Mitchelle Stephenson	5,496	36.6
Write-in		10	0.1
Republican hold			

=== District 31A ===
Maryland House of Delegates District 31A Democratic primary election, 2014
Party	Candidate	Votes	%
Democratic	Ned Carey	1,432	62.8
Democratic	John Moran	590	25.9
Democratic	Robert Haynes	259	11.4

Maryland House of Delegates District 31A election, 2014
Party	Candidate	Votes	%
Democratic	Ned Carey	5,221	52.6
Republican	Terry Lynn DeGraw	4,698	47.3
Write-in		9	0.1
Democratic gain from Republican			

=== District 31B ===
Maryland House of Delegates District 31B Republican primary election, 2014
Party	Candidate	Votes	%
Republican	Nic Kipke (incumbent)	3,920	31.0
Republican	Meagan Simonaire	3,075	24.3
Republican	Gus Kurtz	1,779	14.1
Republican	Brian A. Chisholm	1,607	12.7
Republican	Faith M. Loudon	1,017	8.1
Republican	Don H. Dwyer Jr. (incumbent)	890	7.0
Republican	Paul William Drgos, Jr.	230	1.8
Republican	David Lee Therrien	111	0.9

Maryland House of Delegates District 31B Democratic primary election, 2014
Party	Candidate	Votes	%
Democratic	Jeremiah Chiappelli	2,088	35.9
Democratic	Doug Morris	2,048	35.2
Democratic	Stan Janor	1,686	29.0

Maryland House of Delegates District 31B election, 2014
Party	Candidate	Votes	%
Republican	Nic Kipke (incumbent)	20,858	39.9
Republican	Meagan C. Simonaire	19,555	37.4
Democratic	Jeremiah Chiappelli	6,332	12.1
Democratic	Doug Morris	5,394	10.3
Write-in		88	0.2
Republican hold			
Republican hold			

=== District 32 ===
Maryland House of Delegates District 32 Democratic primary election, 2014
Party	Candidate	Votes	%
Democratic	Pamela Beidle (incumbent)	4,631	25.9
Democratic	Mark S. Chang	3,910	21.8
Democratic	Theodore J. Sophocleus (incumbent)	3,232	18.0
Democratic	Tonja McCoy	2,364	13.2
Democratic	Spencer Dove	2,357	13.2
Democratic	Steven D. Wyatt	1,420	7.9

Maryland House of Delegates District 32 Republican primary election, 2014
Party	Candidate	Votes	%
Republican	Tim Walters	2,533	30.2
Republican	Joseph Fioravante	2,147	25.6
Republican	Mark Angell	2,012	24.0
Republican	Jesse Mayer	1,699	20.2

Maryland House of Delegates District 32 election, 2014
Party	Candidate	Votes	%
Democratic	Pamela Beidle (incumbent)	17,120	20.0
Democratic	Mark S. Chang (incumbent)	15,904	18.6
Democratic	Theodore J. Sophocleus (incumbent)	14,995	17.5
Republican	Tim Walters	13,066	15.3
Republican	Mark Angell	12,327	14.4
Republican	Joseph Fioravante	12,012	14.0
Write-in		85	0.1
Democratic hold			
Democratic hold			
Democratic hold			

=== District 33 ===
Maryland House of Delegates District 33 Republican primary election, 2014
Party	Candidate	Votes	%
Republican	Cathy Vitale (incumbent)	8,188	29.0
Republican	Sid Saab	5,917	21.0
Republican	Tony McConkey (incumbent)	4,142	14.7
Republican	Jeff Ferguson	3,608	12.8
Republican	Jamie Falcon	3,595	12.7
Republican	Nora Keenan	1,414	5.0
Republican	Jeff Gauges	1,339	4.7

Maryland House of Delegates District 33 election, 2014
Party	Candidate	Votes	%
Republican	Cathy Vitale (incumbent)	35,987	26.1
Republican	Sid Saab	29,519	21.4
Republican	Tony McConkey (incumbent)	27,262	19.8
Democratic	Henry Green	15,966	11.6
Democratic	Tom Angelis	15,138	11.0
Democratic	Kostas Alexakis	13,631	9.9
Write-in		198	0.1
Republican hold			
Republican hold			
Republican hold			

=== District 34A ===
Maryland House of Delegates District 34A Democratic primary election, 2014
Party	Candidate	Votes	%
Democratic	Mary Ann Lisanti	2,473	29.0
Democratic	Marla Posey-Moss	1,895	22.2
Democratic	Pat Murray	1,784	20.9
Democratic	Steve Johnson	1,574	18.4
Democratic	Maria Terry	812	9.5

Maryland House of Delegates District 34A Republican primary election, 2014
Party	Candidate	Votes	%
Republican	Glen Glass (incumbent)	2,314	48.7
Republican	Mike Blizzard	1,314	27.7
Republican	Beth Boyson	1,120	23.6

Maryland House of Delegates District 34A election, 2014
Party	Candidate	Votes	%
Republican	Glen Glass (incumbent)	10,779	28.4
Democratic	Mary Ann Lisanti	10,015	26.4
Republican	Mike Blizzard	9,041	23.8
Democratic	Marla Posey-Moss	8,057	21.2
Write-in		49	0.1
Republican hold			
Democratic hold			

=== District 34B ===
Maryland House of Delegates District 34B Democratic primary election, 2014
Party	Candidate	Votes	%
Democratic	Cassandra R. Beverley	1,731	77.2
Democratic	Jeff Dinger	510	22.8

Maryland House of Delegates District 34B election, 2014
Party	Candidate	Votes	%
Republican	Susan K. McComas	11,801	72.7
Democratic	Cassandra R. Beverley	4,419	27.2
Write-in		20	0.1
Republican hold			

=== District 35A ===
Maryland House of Delegates District 35A Republican primary election, 2014
Party	Candidate	Votes	%
Republican	Kevin Hornberger	1,224	49.5
Republican	John C. Mackie, Jr.	928	37.6
Republican	Mary Catherine Podlesak	319	12.9

Maryland House of Delegates District 35A election, 2014
Party	Candidate	Votes	%
Republican	Kevin Hornberger	6,225	56.5
Democratic	David D. Rudolph (incumbent)	4,778	43.4
Write-in		13	0.1
Republican gain from Democratic			

=== District 35B ===
Maryland House of Delegates District 35B Republican primary election, 2014
Party	Candidate	Votes	%
Republican	Andrew Cassilly	3,866	34.3
Republican	Teresa E. Reilly	3,782	33.5
Republican	Jason C. Gallion	3,634	32.2

Maryland House of Delegates District 35B election, 2014
Party	Candidate	Votes	%
Republican	Andrew Cassilly	23,556	42.8
Republican	Teresa Reilly	21,006	38.1
Democratic	Jeffrey Elliott	5,952	10.8
Democratic	Daniel Lewis Lamey	4,495	8.2
Write-in		72	0.1
Republican hold			
Republican hold			

=== District 36 ===
Maryland House of Delegates District 36 Republican primary election, 2014
Party	Candidate	Votes	%
Republican	Jay A. Jacobs (incumbent)	6,796	26.8
Republican	Steven J. Arentz (incumbent)	6,372	25.1
Republican	Jefferson L. Ghrist	4,307	17.0
Republican	Michael D. Smigiel Sr. (incumbent)	4,163	16.4
Republican	Alan McCarthy	2,067	8.1
Republican	J. D. Uhler	1,048	4.1
Republican	Rod Heinze	641	2.5

Maryland House of Delegates District 36 election, 2014
Party	Candidate	Votes	%
Republican	Jay A. Jacobs (incumbent)	33,579	29.7
Republican	Jeff Ghrist	27,259	24.1
Republican	Steve Arentz (incumbent)	25,516	22.6
Democratic	Irving Pinder	14,045	12.4
Democratic	Robert Alan Thornton, Jr.	12,184	10.8
Write-in		313	0.3
Republican hold			
Republican hold			
Republican hold			

=== District 37A ===
Maryland House of Delegates District 37A election, 2014
Party	Candidate	Votes	%
Democratic	Sheree Sample-Hughes	6,204	98.5
Write-in		94	1.5
Democratic hold			

=== District 37B ===
Maryland House of Delegates District 37B Republican primary election, 2014
Party	Candidate	Votes	%
Republican	Johnny Mautz	5,896	35.8
Republican	Christopher T. Adams	4,030	24.5
Republican	Rene Desmarais	3,082	18.7
Republican	Karen Tolley	1,850	11.2
Republican	Allen Nelson	1,604	9.7

Maryland House of Delegates District 37B Republican primary election, 2014
Party	Candidate	Votes	%
Republican	Johnny Mautz	21,057	39.8
Republican	Christopher T. Adams	16,046	30.3
Democratic	Keasha N. Haythe	7,957	15.0
Democratic	Rodney Benjamin	7,852	14.8
Write-in		27	0.1
Republican hold			
Republican hold			

=== District 38A ===
Maryland House of Delegates District 38A election, 2014
Party	Candidate	Votes	%
Republican	Charles J. Otto (incumbent)	7,431	60.5
Democratic	Percy J. Purnell, Jr.	4,838	39.4
Write-in		10	0.1
Republican hold			

=== District 38B ===
Maryland House of Delegates District 38B election, 2014
Party	Candidate	Votes	%
Republican	Carl Anderton Jr.	5,617	52.2
Democratic	Norman Conway (incumbent)	5,133	47.7
Write-in		5	0.0
Republican gain from Democratic			

=== District 38C ===
Maryland House of Delegates District 38C Democratic primary election, 2014
Party	Candidate	Votes	%
Democratic	Judy H. Davis	1,605	84.3
Democratic	Mike Hindi	298	15.7

Maryland House of Delegates District 38C election, 2014
Party	Candidate	Votes	%
Republican	Mary Beth Carozza	11,611	73.9
Democratic	Judy H. Davis	4,100	26.1
Write-in		3	0.0
Republican hold			

=== District 39 ===
Maryland House of Delegates District 39 election, 2014
Party	Candidate	Votes	%
Democratic	Charles E. Barkley (incumbent)	15,247	23.0
Democratic	Shane Robinson (incumbent)	14,179	21.4
Democratic	Kirill Reznik (incumbent)	13,788	20.8
Republican	Gloria Chang	8,117	12.2
Republican	Al Phillips	7,565	11.4
Republican	Xiangfei Cheng	7,340	11.1
Write-in		67	0.1
Democratic hold			
Democratic hold			
Democratic hold			

=== District 40 ===
Maryland House of Delegates District 40 Democratic primary election, 2014
Party	Candidate	Votes	%
Democratic	Antonio Hayes	4,921	18.9
Democratic	Frank M. Conaway Jr. (incumbent)	4,324	16.6
Democratic	Barbara A. Robinson (incumbent)	4,243	16.3
Democratic	Shawn Z. Tarrant (incumbent)	4,034	15.5
Democratic	Marvin "Doc" Cheatham	3,496	13.4
Democratic	Rob "Bobby" LaPin	1,564	6.0
Democratic	Quianna M. Cooke	1,169	4.5
Democratic	Douglas R. Barry	927	3.6
Democratic	Bill Marker	761	2.9
Democratic	Timothy Mercer	665	2.5

Maryland House of Delegates District 40 election, 2014
Party	Candidate	Votes	%
Democratic	Antonio Hayes	14,430	31.7
Democratic	Frank M. Conaway, Jr. (incumbent)	13,968	30.7
Democratic	Barbara A. Robinson (incumbent)	13,946	30.6
Write-in		3,171	7.0
Democratic hold			
Democratic hold			
Democratic hold			

=== District 41 ===
Maryland House of Delegates District 41 Democratic primary election, 2014
Party	Candidate	Votes	%
Democratic	Jill P. Carter (incumbent)	12,081	31.0
Democratic	Nathaniel T. Oaks (incumbent)	10,226	26.2
Democratic	Samuel I. Rosenberg (incumbent)	9,988	25.6
Democratic	Joyce J. Smith	4,028	10.3
Democratic	Michael Pearson	2,646	6.8

Maryland House of Delegates District 41 election, 2014
Party	Candidate	Votes	%
Democratic	Jill P. Carter (incumbent)	24,038	35.1
Democratic	Samuel I. "Sandy" Rosenberg (incumbent)	22,284	32.6
Democratic	Nathaniel T. Oaks (incumbent)	21,551	31.5
Write-in		516	0.7
Democratic hold			
Democratic hold			
Democratic hold			

=== District 42A ===
Maryland House of Delegates District 42A election, 2014
Party	Candidate	Votes	%
Democratic	Stephen W. Lafferty	7,776	60.8
Republican	Michael A. McAllister	4,999	39.1
Write-in		18	0.1
Democratic hold			

=== District 42B ===
Maryland House of Delegates District 42B Republican primary election, 2014
Party	Candidate	Votes	%
Republican	Susan L. M. Aumann (incumbent)	3,987	40.2
Republican	Chris West	3,499	35.2
Republican	Joseph C. Boteler III (incumbent)	1,912	19.3
Republican	Jesse Filamor	531	5.3

Maryland House of Delegates District 42B election, 2014
Party	Candidate	Votes	%
Republican	Susan L. M. Aumann (incumbent)	23,193	38.8
Republican	Chris West	19,932	33.3
Democratic	Robbie Leonard	8,932	14.9
Democratic	Craig J. Little	7,677	12.8
Write-in		79	0.1
Republican hold			
Republican hold			

=== District 43 ===
Maryland House of Delegates District 43 Democratic primary election, 2014
Party	Candidate	Votes	%
Democratic	Maggie McIntosh (incumbent)	11,444	31.8
Democratic	Curt Anderson (incumbent)	11,167	31.0
Democratic	Mary L. Washington (incumbent)	10,563	29.3
Democratic	Timothy Vance	2,863	7.9

Maryland House of Delegates District 43 election, 2014
Party	Candidate	Votes	%
Democratic	Curt Anderson (incumbent)	23,046	34.1
Democratic	Maggie McIntosh (incumbent)	22,310	33.0
Democratic	Mary Washington (incumbent)	21,800	32.3
Write-in		395	0.6
Democratic hold			

=== District 44A ===
Maryland House of Delegates District 44A Democratic primary election, 2014
Party	Candidate	Votes	%
Democratic	Keith E. Haynes (incumbent)	1,734	43.4
Democratic	Keiffer Mitchell Jr. (incumbent)	1,574	39.4
Democratic	Melvin L. Stukes (incumbent)	691	17.3

Maryland House of Delegates District 44A election, 2014
Party	Candidate	Votes	%
Democratic	Keith E. Haynes (incumbent)	7,497	99.3
Write-in		55	0.7
Democratic hold			

=== District 44B ===
Maryland House of Delegates District 44B Democratic primary election, 2014
Party	Candidate	Votes	%
Democratic	Charles E. Sydnor III	3,849	23.4
Democratic	Pat Young	3,763	22.9
Democratic	Aaron J. Barnett	3,729	22.7
Democratic	Rainier Harvey	2,936	17.9
Democratic	Bishop Barry Chapman	1,605	9.8
Democratic	Frederick D. Ware-Newsome	535	3.3

Maryland House of Delegates District 44B election, 2014
Party	Candidate	Votes	%
Democratic	Charles E. Sydnor, III (incumbent)	16,314	41.8
Democratic	Pat Young	16,013	41.0
Republican	Michael J. Russell	6,622	17.0
Write-in		109	0.2
Democratic hold			
Democratic hold			

=== District 45 ===
Maryland House of Delegates District 45 Democratic primary election, 2014
Party	Candidate	Votes	%
Democratic	Cheryl Glenn (incumbent)	6,446	22.3
Democratic	Talmadge Branch (incumbent)	6,120	21.2
Democratic	Cory V. McCray	5,624	19.5
Democratic	Robert Stokes, Sr.	4,867	16.9
Democratic	Kevin W. Parson	1,842	6.4
Democratic	Marques Dent	1,793	6.2
Democratic	Harry Spikes	1,414	4.9
Democratic	Aaron Keith Wilkes	738	2.6

Maryland House of Delegates District 45 election, 2014
Party	Candidate	Votes	%
Democratic	Cheryl Glenn (incumbent)	18,197	29.3
Democratic	Talmadge Branch (incumbent)	18,058	29.1
Democratic	Cory V. McCray	17,123	27.6
Republican	Rick Saffery	3,078	5.0
Republican	Larry O. Wardlow, Jr.	2,805	4.5
Libertarian	Ronald M. Owens-Bey	2,734	4.4
Write-in		117	0.2
Democratic hold			
Democratic hold			
Democratic hold			

=== District 46 ===
Maryland House of Delegates District 46 election, 2014
Party	Candidate	Votes	%
Democratic	Brooke Lierman	6,014	28.1
Democratic	Peter A. Hammen (incumbent)	5,400	25.2
Democratic	Luke Clippinger (incumbent)	5,123	23.9
Democratic	Bill Romani	3,139	14.7
Democratic	Liam F. Davis	1,745	8.1

Maryland House of Delegates District 46 election, 2014
Party	Candidate	Votes	%
Democratic	Brooke Lierman	13,889	24.6
Democratic	Peter A. Hammen (incumbent)	13,217	23.4
Democratic	Luke Clippinger (incumbent)	12,680	22.5
Republican	Roger D. Bedingfield	6,113	10.8
Republican	Joseph "Joh" Sedtal	5,275	9.4
Republican	Duane Shelton	5,115	9.1
Write-in		117	0.2
Democratic hold			
Democratic hold			
Democratic hold			

=== District 47A ===
Maryland House of Delegates District 47A Democratic primary election, 2014
Party	Candidate	Votes	%
Democratic	Jimmy Tarlau	2,728	26.7
Democratic	Diana M. Fennell	2,416	23.7
Democratic	Michael G. Summers (incumbent)	1,740	17.1
Democratic	Malcolm Augustine	1,688	16.6
Democratic	Joseph Solomon	1,627	16.0

Maryland House of Delegates District 47A election, 2014
Party	Candidate	Votes	%
Democratic	Diana M. Fennell	11,198	52.1
Democratic	Jimmy Tarlau	8,836	41.1
Republican	Fred Price, Jr.	1,424	6.6
Write-in		55	0.3
Democratic hold			
Democratic hold			

=== District 47B ===
Maryland House of Delegates District 47B election, 2014
Party	Candidate	Votes	%
Democratic	Will Campos	3,182	99.3
Write-in		21	0.7
Democratic hold			
