= James E. Malone Jr. =

American politician (1957–2024)

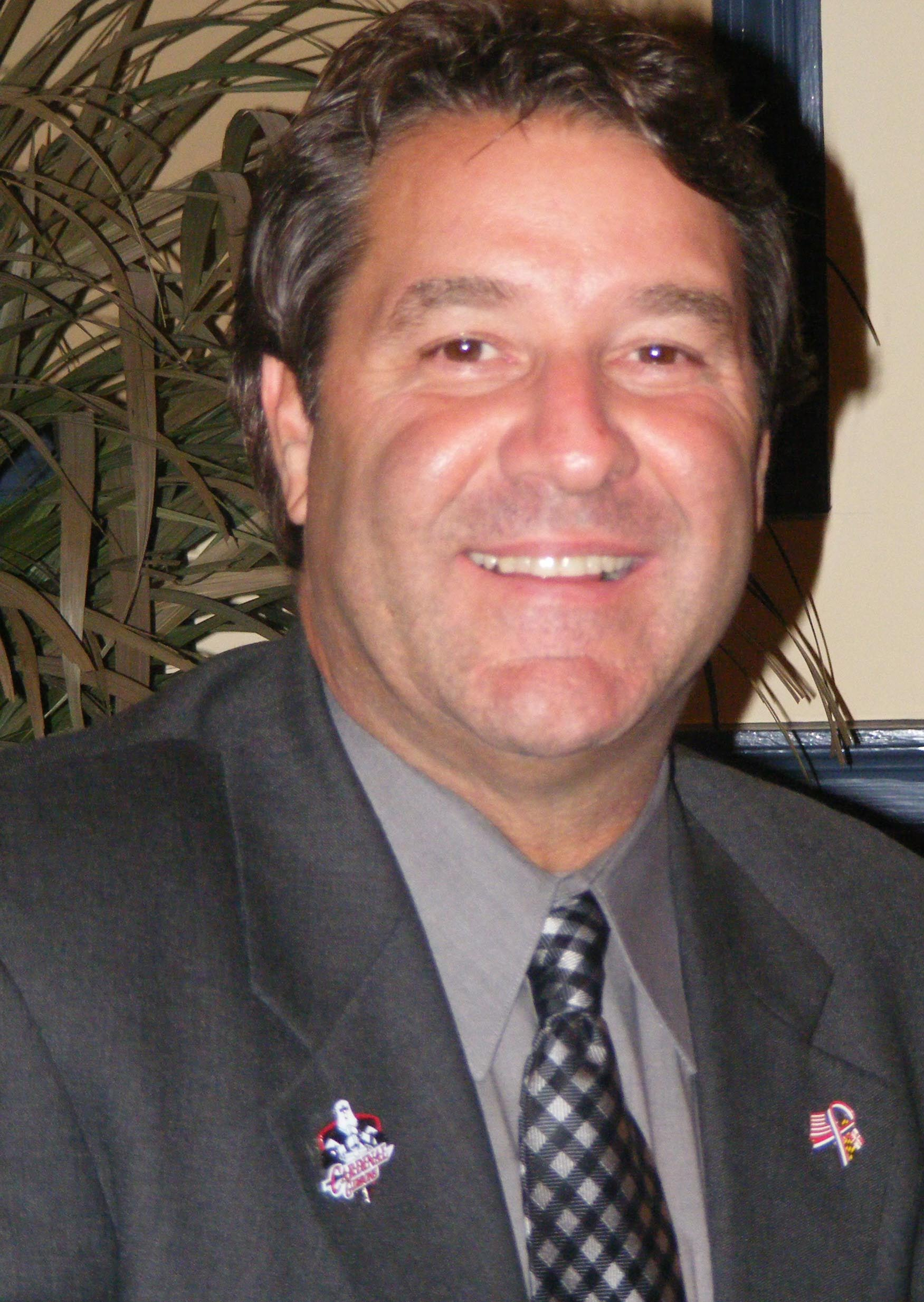
- Malone in 2007

Member of the Maryland House of Delegates from the 12A district
- In office January 11, 1995 – November 30, 2014
- Preceded by: Thomas E. Dewberry; Kenneth H. Masters; Louis P. Morsberger
- Succeeded by: Eric Ebersole; Terri Hill; Clarence Lam

Personal details
- Born: July 8, 1957 Baltimore, Maryland, U.S.
- Died: December 16, 2024 (aged 67) Havre de Grace, Maryland, U.S.
- Party: Democratic
- Spouse: Darlene
- Children: 2
- Parent: James E. Malone (father)
- Education: Community College of Baltimore County (AA)
- Occupation: Firefighter

James Edward Malone Jr. (July 8, 1957 – December 16, 2024) was an American politician from Maryland and a member of the Democratic Party. He served in the Maryland House of Delegates, representing Maryland's District 12A in Baltimore and Howard Counties from 1995 to 2014. Malone also served as director of the Harford County Department of Parks and Recreation from 2014 to 2016.

== Early life and education ==
Malone was born in Baltimore, Maryland on July 8, 1957, to Margaret Ann Daniels (1933–2021) and James E. Malone (1927–2002), a 34-year railroad worker for the Western Maryland Railroad who served in the Maryland House of Delegates for 12 years and later became the sheriff of Baltimore County. He is of Irish descent.

Malone was raised in Arbutus, Maryland. He graduated from Cardinal Gibbons High School, afterwards attending Catonsville Community College, where he earned an Associate of Arts degree in 1986. After graduating, Malone worked as a firefighter for the Arbutus Volunteer Fire Department, becoming the department's youngest ever president in 1979, and the Baltimore County Fire Department, retiring in March 2007. Malone later joined the Susquehanna House Company Division 5 after moving to Harford County.

== Maryland House of Delegates ==
Malone was first elected to the Maryland House of Delegates in 1994, where he represented Baltimore and Howard counties in Maryland Legislative District 12A. He was a member of the Commerce and Government Matters Committee until 2003, afterwards serving as the vice chair of the House Environmental Matters Committee until his resignation. In the legislature, Malone was known for his work on highway and road safety issues, as well as firefighter safety regulations targeting per- and polyfluoroalkyl substances in protective gear. He was also known for prank calling other delegates during floor debates and for "throwing votes" on bills in committee, to the irritation of committee chair John F. Wood Jr.

At the time of his election, Malone was a lieutenant in the Baltimore County fire marshal's office and an assistant state fire marshal. In December 1994, Maryland Assistant Attorney General Robert A. Zarnoch wrote to Malone informing him that he could not be a firefighter and a member of the House of Delegates at the same time, saying that a county firefighter was an "office of profit" under the Constitution of Maryland. Malone was allowed to continue working as a firefighter after Baltimore County stripped Malone of his ability to write citations by moving him to a supervisory position.

Malone resigned from the House of Delegates on November 30, 2014, after Republican Harford County Executive Barry Glassman appointed him as the director of the Harford County Department of Parks and Recreation. He resigned from this position in April 2016.

== Personal life and death ==
Malone was married to his wife, Darlene. He had two children, James Malone III and Danica Crum.

Malone was a leukemia survivor. He moved in 2014 to live in Havre de Grace, Maryland, where he died from brain cancer on December 16, 2024, at the age of 67. During the 2025 legislative session, the Maryland General Assembly passed the James "Jimmy" Malone Act, which requires counties that offer self-insured employee health plans to provide firefighters with coverage for preventive cancer screenings without copays or deductibles.

== Electoral history ==
Maryland House of Delegates District 12A election, 1994
Party	Candidate	Votes	%
Republican	Donald E. Murphy	10,340	27.1
Democratic	James E. Malone Jr.	9,712	25.4
Republican	Donald Drehoff	9,596	25.1
Democratic	Kenneth H. Masters (incumbent)	8,527	22.3

Maryland House of Delegates District 12A election, 1998
Party	Candidate	Votes	%
Democratic	James E. Malone Jr. (incumbent)	13,222	31.4
Republican	Donald E. Murphy (incumbent)	10,920	26.0
Democratic	Steven J. DeBoy Sr.	10,669	25.4
Republican	Loyd V. Smith	7,245	17.2

Maryland House of Delegates District 12A election, 2002
Party	Candidate	Votes	%
Democratic	James E. Malone Jr. (incumbent)	15,615	31.8
Democratic	Steven J. DeBoy Sr.	12,376	25.2
Republican	Joe Hooe	11,193	22.8
Republican	Harry Korrell	9,875	20.1
Write-in		24	0.1

Maryland House of Delegates District 12A election, 2006
Party	Candidate	Votes	%
Democratic	James E. Malone Jr. (incumbent)	15,130	30.6
Democratic	Steven J. DeBoy Sr. (incumbent)	13,929	28.1
Republican	Joe Hooe	11,141	22.5
Republican	Albert L. Nalley	9,286	18.8
Write-in		28	0.1

Maryland House of Delegates District 12A election, 2010
Party	Candidate	Votes	%
Democratic	James E. Malone Jr. (incumbent)	14,109	28.3
Democratic	Steven J. DeBoy Sr. (incumbent)	13,011	26.1
Republican	Joseph D."Joe" Hooe	12,327	24.7
Republican	Albert L. Nalley	10,453	20.9
Write-in		32	0.1
