= Clarence Lam =

American politician (born 1980)

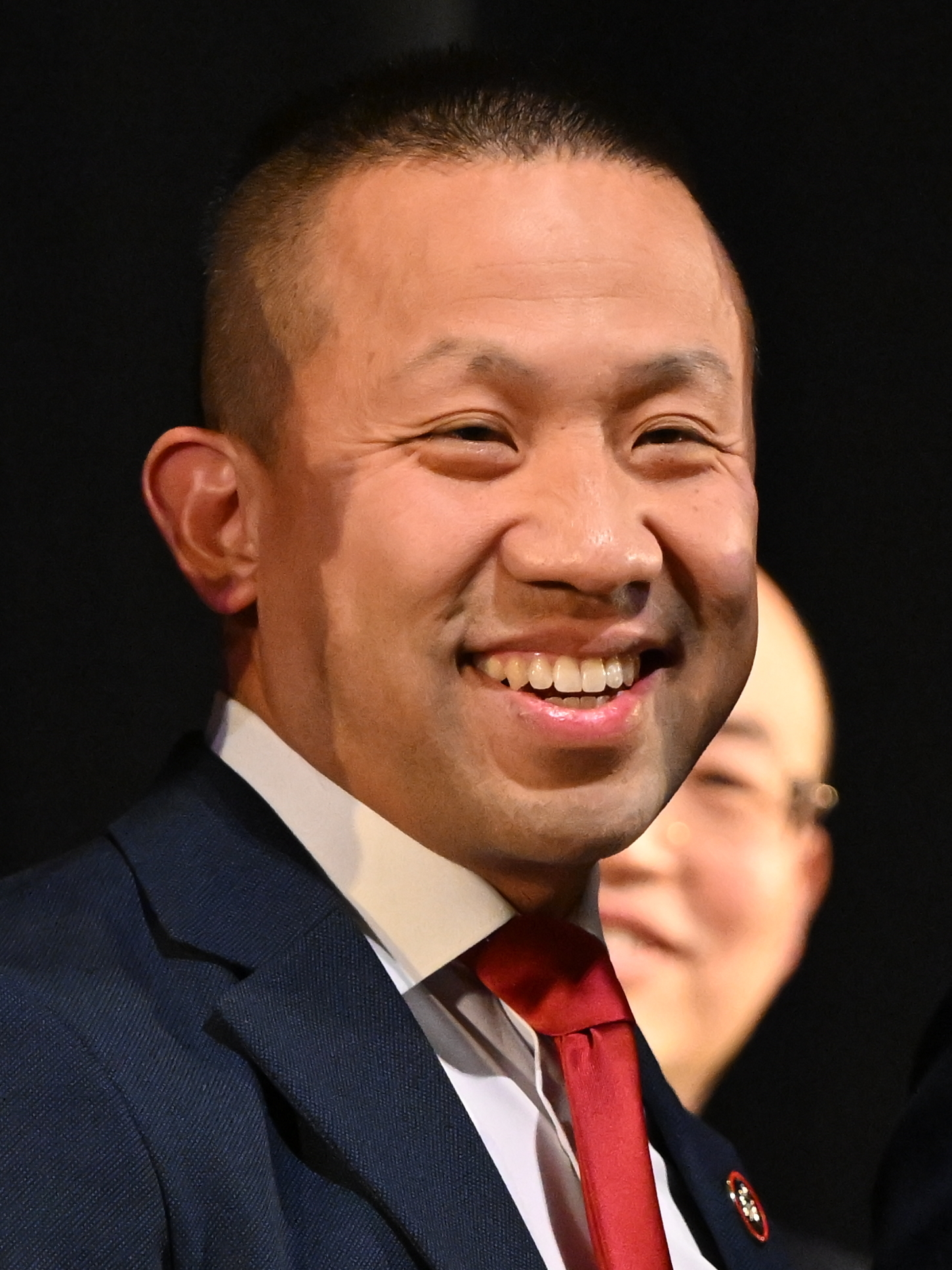
- Lam in 2026

Member of the Maryland Senate from the 12th district
- Incumbent
- Assumed office January 9, 2019
- Preceded by: Edward J. Kasemeyer

Member of the Maryland House of Delegates from the 12th district
- In office January 14, 2015 – January 9, 2019 Serving with Eric Ebersole, Terri L. Hill
- Preceded by: Steven J. DeBoy Sr. (12A); James E. Malone Jr. (12A); Elizabeth Bobo (12B)
- Succeeded by: Jessica Feldmark

Personal details
- Born: Clarence Kirk Lam; November 26, 1980 (age 45) Allentown, Pennsylvania, U.S.
- Party: Democratic
- Children: 1
- Education: Case Western Reserve University (BA); University of Maryland, Baltimore (MD); Johns Hopkins University (MPH)
- Website: Official website

Clarence Lam
- Chinese: 林力圖
Transcriptions
Standard Mandarin
- Hanyu Pinyin: Lín Lìtú
Yue: Cantonese
- Jyutping: Lam4 Lik6 Tou4

Clarence Kirk Lam (born November 26, 1980) is an American politician and physician who has served in the Maryland Senate representing the 12th district since 2019. A member of the Democratic Party, his district stretches across Anne Arundel and Howard counties and includes parts of Columbia and Glen Burnie. Lam previously represented the district in the Maryland House of Delegates from 2015 to 2019.

Lam ran for the 2024 U.S. House of Representatives election in Maryland's 3rd congressional district, in which he was defeated by state senator Sarah Elfreth in the Democratic primary election.

== Early life and education ==
Clarence Kirk Lam was born in Allentown, Pennsylvania, on November 26, 1980. He is a second-generation Asian American, with his mother immigrating to the U.S. from Taiwan and his father immigrating from Hong Kong. After graduating from Emmaus High School, Lam attended Case Western Reserve University, where he earned a Bachelor of Arts degree in political science and biology in 2003; the University of Maryland School of Medicine, where he earned a Doctor of Medicine degree in 2008; and Johns Hopkins University, where he earned a Masters of Public Health degree in 2011.

While at UMB, Lam was the president of the campus student body and worked as a research analyst for the Johns Hopkins Bloomberg School of Public Health from 2005 to 2006.

Lam has worked as a preventive medicine physician at the Johns Hopkins Bloomberg School of Public Health since 2009. He has also served on the board of directors of Healthy Howard since 2011. During the COVID-19 pandemic and following the 2020 legislative session, Lam worked as the interim director of the Johns Hopkins Occupational Health Services, in which he coordinated the screening of health care workers and treatment of COVID-19 patients.

== Political career ==
From 2009 to 2013, Lam worked as a legislative aide to state delegate Dan K. Morhaim. He also served as the executive director of the Asian American and Pacific Islander Leadership Council of the Maryland Democratic Party and as a member of the Howard County Spending Affordability Advisory Committee from 2011 to 2014. From 2012 to 2015, he was a member of the Governor's Commission on Asian-Pacific American Affairs.

Lam was elected to the Howard County Democratic Central Committee and became the chapter president of the local Young Democrats club in 2010. He was elected to the board of directors of the village of Harper's Choice in 2011, serving until 2015. In 2012, Lam served as a delegate to the Democratic National Convention, pledged to President Barack Obama.

== In the legislature ==
=== Maryland House of Delegates ===
Lam was elected to the Maryland House of Delegates in 2014, during which he ran on a slate with state senator Edward J. Kasemeyer and candidates Eric Ebersole and Terri L. Hill. He was sworn in on January 14, 2015. He was a member of the Environment and Transportation Committee from 2015 to 2017, afterwards serving in the Appropriations Committee until 2019.

On February 13, 2018, Lam announced that he would run for the Maryland Senate in District 12, seeking to succeed Kasemeyer, who had announced his retirement. His candidacy was backed by the district's other two state delegates, Ebersole and Hill. The district was targeted by the Maryland Republican Party in their "Fight for Five" campaign in 2018. Lam won the Democratic primary on June 26, 2018, defeating Howard County councilmember Mary Kay Sigaty with 72.6 percent of the vote, faced Republican Joseph Hooe in the general election, who he defeated with 33.8 percent of the vote. He was re-elected in 2022.

=== Maryland Senate ===
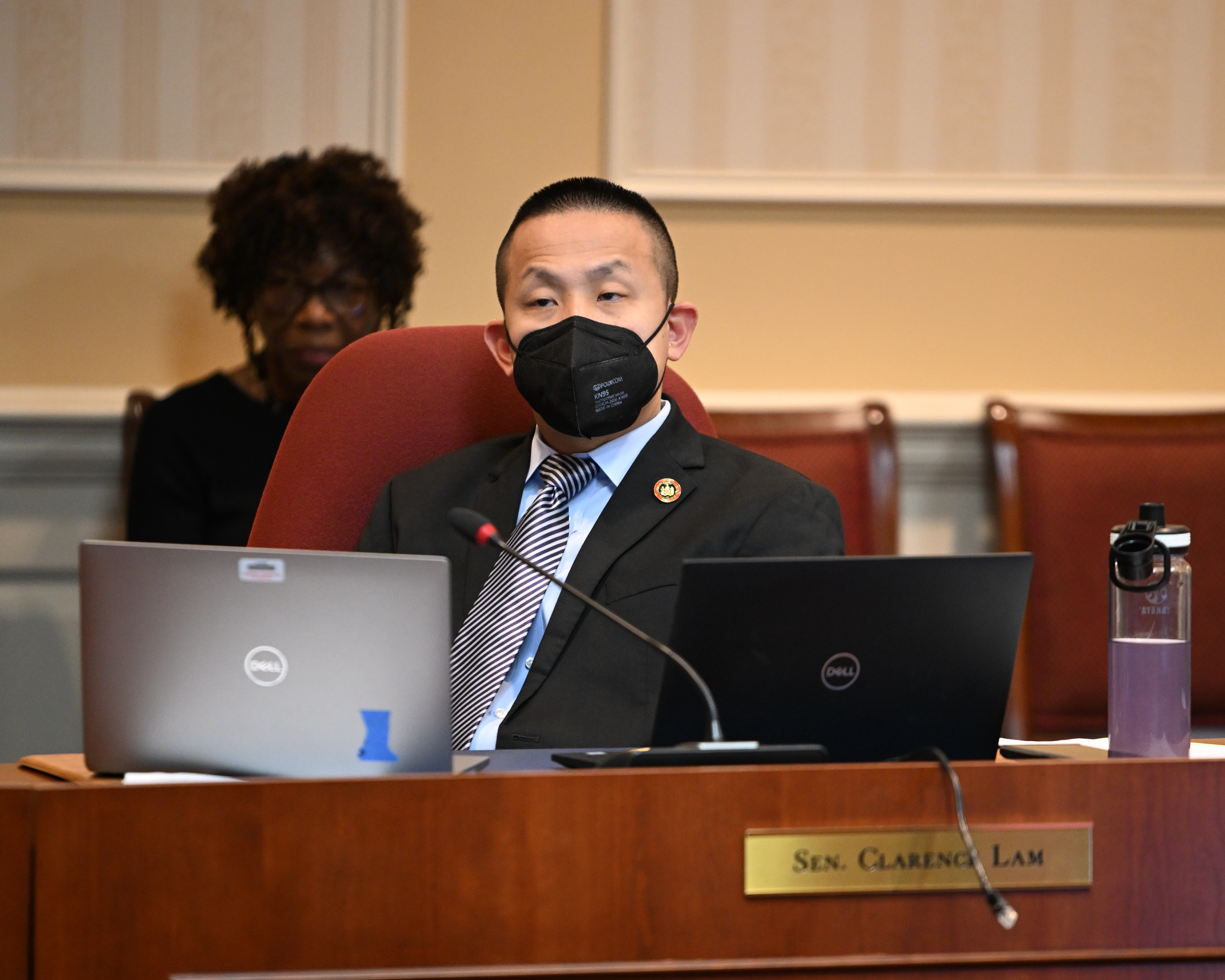
Lam in the Senate Finance Committee, 2023

Lam was sworn into the Maryland Senate on January 9, 2019. He was a member of the Health and Environmental Affairs Committee until 2023, afterwards serving as a member of the Finance Committee. He has also served on the Executive Nominations Committee since 2019 and became the committee's vice chair in October 2023, making him the first Asian American to serve as chair or vice chair of a Senate committee. As of 2024, Lam is the only physician and only Asian American in the Maryland Senate.

In 2020, Senate President Bill Ferguson appointed Lam to chair the Joint Committee on Fair Practices alongside Erek Barron. In this capacity, he became a frequent critic of Larry Hogan and his administration, and investigated the circumstances surrounding the $238,250 severance package paid to Roy McGrath, the former director of the Maryland Environmental Service and Hogan's chief of staff. He also criticized the University of Maryland Medical System following the Healthy Holly scandal.

=== 2024 congressional campaign ===
On November 30, 2023, Lam announced that he would run for Congress in Maryland's 3rd congressional district, seeking to succeed retiring U.S. Representative John Sarbanes. If elected, he would be the first Asian American to represent Maryland in Congress. During the Democratic primary, which largely developed into a three-way race between Lam, Sarah Elfreth, and Harry Dunn, Lam campaigned on health-related issues and received support from various advocacy groups and Howard County-based legislators. Lam was defeated in the Democratic primary election by Elfreth on May 14, 2024, placing third with 11.7 percent of the vote.

== Political positions ==
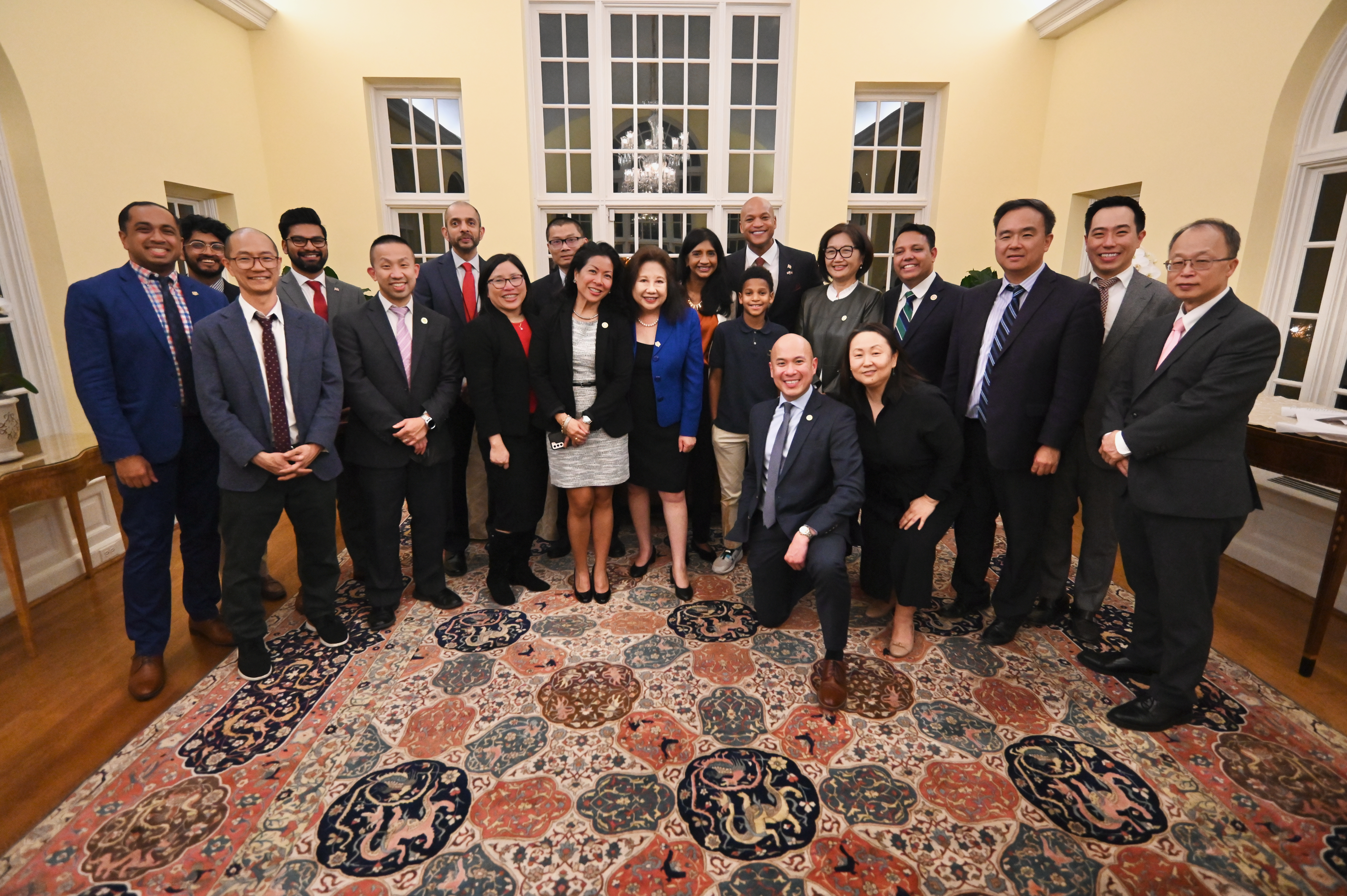
Lam and other members of the Asian-American and Pacific-Islander Caucus with Governor Wes Moore, 2023

=== Education ===
During the 2020 legislative session, Lam introduced a bill to ban lunch shaming in public schools.

In 2023, Lam introduced legislation to create two appointed positions on the county board of education. The bill died after Lam and Courtney Watson, a cosponsor, decided against bringing it up for a vote on the final work day of the Howard County Delegation.

=== Electoral reform ===
During the 2020 legislative session, Lam introduced legislation that would require special elections to fill vacancies in the Maryland General Assembly. He also introduced the Student Voter Empowerment Act, which would require higher education institutions to encourage students to vote in elections.

In August 2025, amid Republican efforts to redraw Texas's congressional districts to gain five congressional seats in the 2026 United States House of Representatives elections, Lam introduced legislation that would redraw Maryland's congressional districts to make Maryland's 1st congressional district more favorable to Democrats. The bill would also require Maryland to use an independent redistricting commission to redraw its congressional districts if California, Texas, Illinois, New York, Florida, Indiana, Missouri, North Carolina, Pennsylvania, and Ohio all began using independent redistricting commissions. During the 2026 legislative session, Lam supported the map proposed by the Governor's Redistricting Advisory Commission, which would redraw Maryland's 1st congressional district to increase the Democratic Party's chances of winning the district, and supported Arthur Ellis's protest against Senate President Bill Ferguson's decision not to hold a vote on redistricting.

=== Environment ===
During the 2019 legislative session, Lam introduced a bill to ban deliberate balloon releases. The bill was reintroduced by state delegate Wayne A. Hartman in 2021, during which he amended the bill to set penalties for mass balloon releases.

In March 2023, during debate on a bill establishing the framework for the state's recreational cannabis industry, Lam introduced an amendment requiring "on-site consumption" establishments to follow the state's Clean Indoor Air Act. The amendment was adopted.

=== Health care ===
Lam opposes efforts to repeal the Affordable Care Act. During his 2018 Senate candidacy, he ran on a platform that included expanding health care access, especially coverage for pregnant women, and taking steps toward universal health coverage. Lam frequently criticized the Hogan administration's decision-making during the COVID-19 pandemic, including the distribution and contracting of the COVID-19 vaccine. In April 2021, he was one of two state senators to vote against confirming Dennis Schrader as Secretary of the Maryland Department of Health, citing criticism of his COVID-19 vaccine rollout.

During the 2015 legislative session, Lam introduced a bill to make it easier for physicians to screen patients for HIV. The bill passed and was signed into law by Governor Larry Hogan. In 2019, he introduced a bill that would allow medical professionals to prescribe pre-exposure prophylaxis, a HIV-prevent drug, to minors, which passed and became law.

During the 2020 legislative session, Lam introduced legislation to extend temporary unemployment benefits to workers who lost their jobs during the COVID-19 pandemic. The bill passed and became law. In March 2022, Lam said he supported legislation to prevent state health officers from being fired without reason.

During the 2023 legislative session, Lam introduced the Access to Care Act, which would allow undocumented immigrants to buy into the state's health exchange. The bill was reintroduced during the 2024 legislative session.

In December 2025, Lam opposed the One Big Beautiful Bill Act, saying that the law would put at risk "a lot of the gains we've made when it comes to expanding coverage for Medicaid patients".

During the 2026 legislative session, Lam supported the Vax Act, a bill that would allow the Maryland Department of Health to set vaccine recommendations for Marylanders independent of any federal guidelines, criticizing U.S. Health Secretary Robert F. Kennedy Jr. for gutting the "gold standard process that was set up by the federal government, led by the Centers for Disease Control and Prevention".

=== Immigration ===
In 2017, Lam supported the Maryland Trust Act, which would prevent the use of state and local funding for federal immigration enforcement.

During the 2021 legislative session, Lam introduced the Maryland Driver Privacy Act, which would prohibit federal agencies from accessing state databases unless it had a warrant and blocked the state from providing agencies with photos of individuals for immigration investigations. The bill passed, but was vetoed by Governor Larry Hogan. The Maryland General Assembly overrode Hogan's veto during the special legislative session later that year.

During the 2026 legislative session, Lam introduced the Community Trust Act, which would prohibit local law enforcement agencies and jails from detaining any individuals based on immigration status and responding to requests from U.S. Immigration and Customs Enforcement, and the Data Privacy Act, which prohibits businesses from selling personal data of an individual for the purpose of immigration enforcement.

=== Social issues ===
During the 2016 legislative session, Lam introduced legislation to ban dogfighting paraphernalia.

In 2017, Lam introduced legislation to provide immunity to first responders to provide aid to animals during emergencies.

In 2020, Lam introduced legislation to make daylight savings time permanent in Maryland.

In 2021, Lam introduced legislation to ban the use of gay panic defense in criminal court proceedings. The bill passed and went into effect without Governor Larry Hogan's signature.

During the 2022 legislative session and following reports that Governor Larry Hogan and his administration was using the messaging app Wickr, which automatically deletes messages, in official state communications, Lam introduced legislation that would revise the Maryland Public Information Act to include messages sent in the app.

In March 2022, Lam spoke in support of a bill to provide $3.5 million toward training doctors on abortion care.

During the 2023 legislative session, Lam spoke against a proposed amendment that would require minors to get parental consent to receive gender-affirming care. The amendment was rejected in a 14-29 vote. He also introduced legislation to repeal sodomy as a criminal offense, which passed and became law without Governor Wes Moore's signature, and another bill that would cut state funding from school systems that refuse to instruct state-approved curriculum. During the 2024 legislative session, Lam introduced a bill to protect health care providers from liability if they provide gender-affirming care to out-of-state patients.

During the 2026 legislative session, Lam introduced the Birth Certificate Modernization Act, which would allow "X" as a non-binary option on birth certificates.

=== Taxes ===
In March 2014, Lam said he would only support "progressive" tax increases.

== Personal life ==
Lam has a daughter.

== Electoral history ==
Maryland House of Delegates District 12 Democratic primary election, 2014
Party	Candidate	Votes	%
Democratic	Clarence K. Lam	6,307	21.3
Democratic	Terri L. Hill	6,059	20.5
Democratic	Eric Ebersole	4,427	14.9
Democratic	Rebecca P. Dongarra	3,782	12.8
Democratic	Nick Stewart	2,991	10.1
Democratic	Renee McGuirk-Spence	1,908	6.4
Democratic	Brian S. Bailey	1,576	5.3
Democratic	Michael Gisriel	1,246	4.2
Democratic	Adam Sachs	747	2.5
Democratic	Jay Fred Cohen	580	2.0

Maryland House of Delegates District 12 election, 2014
Party	Candidate	Votes	%
Democratic	Eric Ebersole	19,274	18.9
Democratic	Terri L. Hill	19,236	18.9
Democratic	Clarence K. Lam	18,568	18.2
Republican	Joseph D."Joe" Hooe	16,171	15.9
Republican	Rick Martel	14,290	14.0
Republican	Gordon Bull	14,146	13.9
Write-in		110	0.1

Maryland Senate District 12 Democratic primary election, 2018
Party	Candidate	Votes	%
Democratic	Clarence K. Lam	9,658	72.6
Democratic	Mary Kay Sigaty	3,651	27.4

Maryland Senate District 12 election, 2018
Party	Candidate	Votes	%
Democratic	Clarence K. Lam	32,730	66.1
Republican	Joseph D. "Joe" Hooe	16,747	33.8
Write-in		46	0.1

Maryland Senate District 12 election, 2022
Party	Candidate	Votes	%
Democratic	Clarence K. Lam (incumbent)	30,570	70.0
Republican	Bob Cockey	13,078	29.9
Write-in		44	0.1

Maryland's 3rd congressional district Democratic primary results, 2024
Party	Candidate	Votes	%
Democratic	Sarah Elfreth	29,459	36.2
Democratic	Harry Dunn	20,380	25.0
Democratic	Clarence Lam	9,548	11.7
Democratic	Terri Hill	5,318	6.5
Democratic	Mark Chang	4,106	5.0
Democratic	Aisha Khan	2,199	2.7
Democratic	Mike Rogers	2,147	2.6
Democratic	John Morse	1,447	1.8
Democratic	Abigail Diehl	1,379	1.7
Democratic	Lindsay Donahue	1,213	1.5
Democratic	Juan Dominguez	1,205	1.3
Democratic	Michael Coburn (withdrawn)	583	0.7
Democratic	Malcolm Thomas Colombo	527	0.7
Democratic	Don Quinn	408	0.5
Democratic	Kristin Lyman Nabors	397	0.5
Democratic	Jeff Woodard	352	0.4
Democratic	Gary Schuman	286	0.4
Democratic	Mark Gosnell	221	0.3
Democratic	Jake Pretot	162	0.2
Democratic	Matt Libber	159	0.2
Democratic	Stewart Silver	78	0.1
Democratic	Danny Rupli	34	<0.1
