= Terri Hill =

American politician (born 1959)

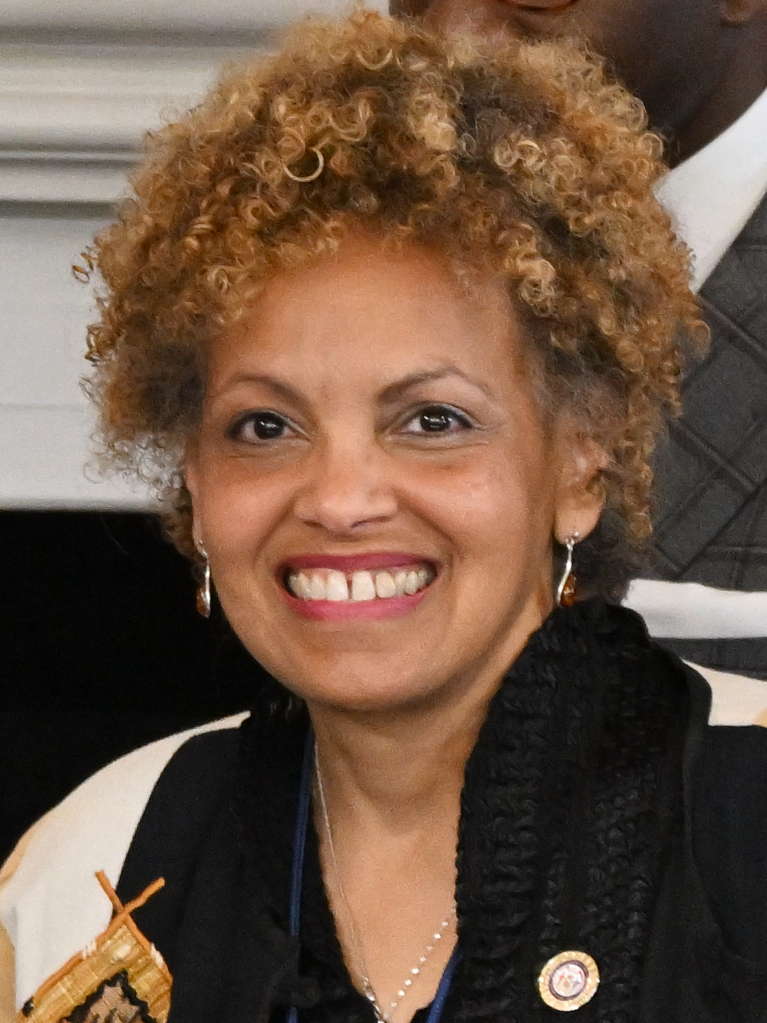

Member of the Maryland House of Delegates
- Incumbent
- Assumed office January 14, 2015 Serving with Jessica Feldmark
- Preceded by: Steven J. DeBoy Sr. (12A); James E. Malone Jr. (12A); Elizabeth Bobo (12B)
- Constituency: District 12 (2015–2023); District 12A (2023–present)

Personal details
- Born: May 3, 1959 (age 67) Philadelphia, Pennsylvania, U.S.
- Party: Democratic
- Education: Harvard University (AB); Columbia University (MD)

Terri Lynn Hill (born May 3, 1959) is an American politician who serves as a member to the Maryland House of Delegates since 2015, first representing the 12th district from 2015 to 2023 and then district 12A since 2023.

A member of the Democratic Party, Hill previously ran for Congress in Maryland's 7th congressional district in the 2020 special election, in which she was defeated by Kweisi Mfume, and in Maryland's 3rd congressional district in 2024, losing to state senator Sarah Elfreth.

== Early life and education ==
Hill was born in Philadelphia on May 3, 1959, where she was raised until her family moved to Columbia, Maryland when she was ten years old. Her mother, Ethel Hill, was a member of the Wilde Lake Village Board, and her sister, Donna Hill Staton, is a former Maryland deputy attorney general and former judge. Hill graduated from Wilde Lake Senior High School and attended Harvard University, where she earned an Bachelor's degree in bioelectric engineering in 1981, and Columbia University, where she earned her Doctor of Medicine degree in 1985.

== Medical career ==
After graduating from Columbia, Hill worked as a plastic surgeon for the Columbia Presbyterian Medical Center until 1990, afterwards completing a fellowship in craniofacial surgery at the University of Miami in 1991. She worked as a surgeon for Operation Smile from 1995 to 1999 and in 2004. Following the September 11 attacks, Hill joined the Maryland Responds Medical Reserve Corps, but was never called on to serve.

Hill has operated her own solo medical practice since 1991, and started her own business, Visage Rejuvenation Spa LLC, in 2006. In March 2021, The Baltimore Sun reported that she had twice participated in a legislative hearing via Zoom while operating on a patient whom she said had given her permission to videoconference into the meetings. An investigation by the Maryland Board of Physicians found that one patient was unaware that she connected to a legislative hearing during surgery, and another was told that she would connect to the meeting 10 minutes before surgery, but no consent paperwork was filed. In October, she was fined $15,000 and reprimanded for again connecting from the operating room. The Joint Committee on Legislative Ethics also declined to charge her with ethics violations for participating in legislative hearings from the operating room.

In addition to her surgery practice, Hill also helps legislators and lobbyists at the Maryland State House with their health issues.

== Political career ==
Hill first got involved in politics as an intern for U.S. Senator Paul Sarbanes.

=== Maryland House of Delegates ===
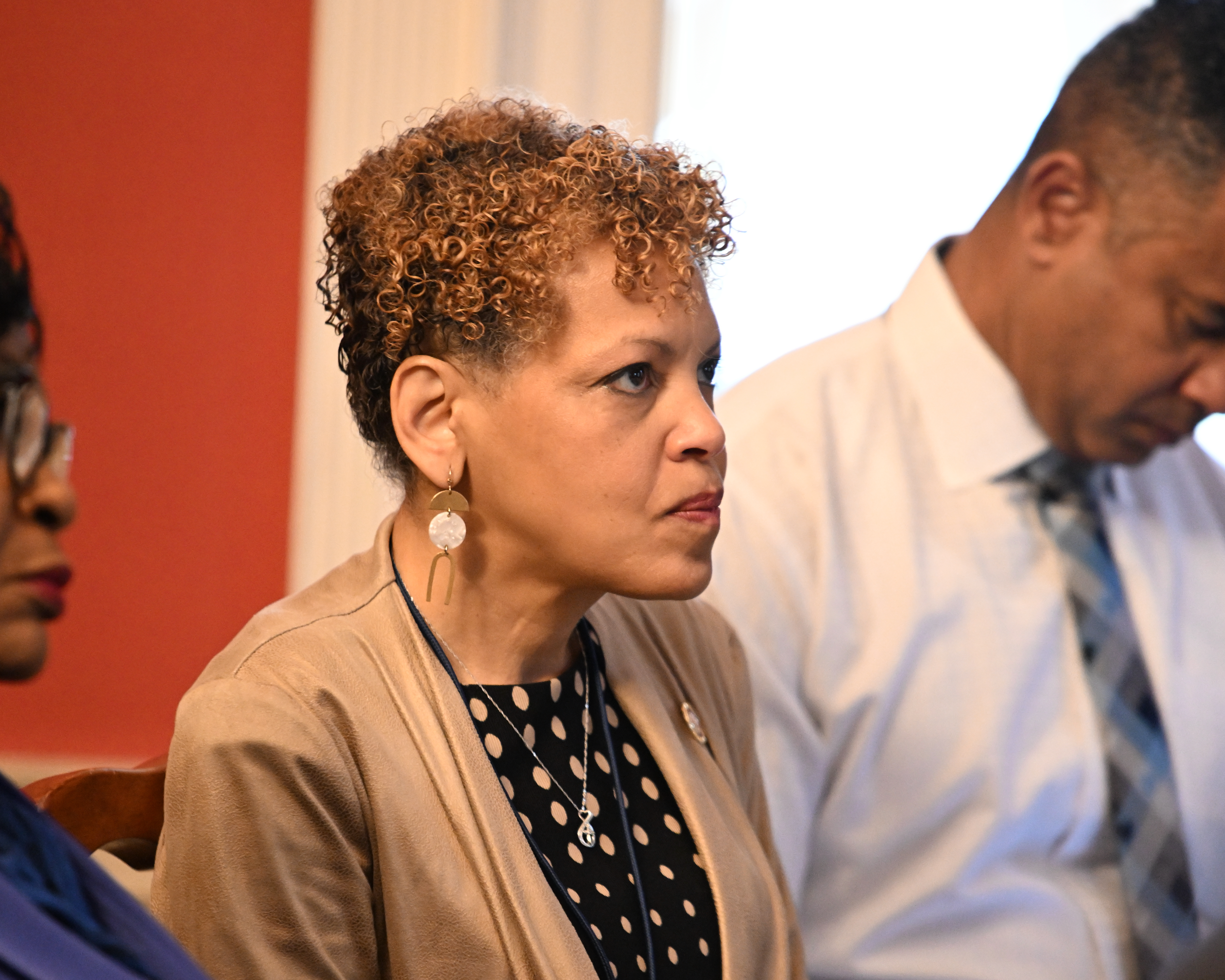
Hill in 2023

Hill was elected alongside newcomers Eric Ebersole and Clarence Lam, with whom she ran on a slate alongside state senator Edward Kasemeyer, in the 2014 Maryland House of Delegates election to succeed state delegates Steve DeBoy, James Malone, and Elizabeth Bobo. She was sworn in on January 14, 2015, and has been a member of the Health and Government Operations Committee during her entire tenure.

=== Congressional campaigns ===
==== 2020 ====
In November 2019, Hill announced that she would run for the U.S. House of Representatives in the special election to succeed the late U.S. Representative Elijah Cummings. Her platform included reforms to health care, social justice, and immigration. The Baltimore Sun described her as a longshot candidate since she was from Howard County and running in a district where Baltimore voters had a significant registration advantage. During the election, she raised just under $50,000 in contributions and spent less than $10,000.

Hill was defeated in the election by former U.S. Representative Kweisi Mfume, placing fourth with 7.4 percent of the vote. She was the top vote-getter in Howard County. Following her defeat, Hill said that she would not run in the overlapping regular 2020 primary election for the same congressional seat.

==== 2024 ====
In November 2023, after John Sarbanes announced that he would not seek re-election in 2024, Hill told The Capital that she would run for Congress in Maryland's 3rd congressional district. She was defeated in the Democratic primary election by state senator Sarah Elfreth on May 14, 2024, placing fourth with 6.5 percent of the vote.

== Political positions ==
=== Education ===
During the 2018 legislative session, Hill introduced legislation that would ban tackle football and other contact sports in elementary and middle schools, citing health risks associated with playing the sports. The bill received an unfavorable report in the House Ways and Means Committee.

In 2019, Hill introduced legislation requiring the Howard County Board of Education to submit annual reports on the rates of children who are "limited English proficient" or enrolled in free or reduced school lunches, and release plans on how the school board intends to reduce disparities in schools. She also supported legislation that would require the school board to notify homeowners of redistricting.

=== Environment ===
During the 2019 legislative session, Hill introduced legislation to allow the Howard County Council to impose a tax on plastic bags. After the bill passed and became law, the county council introduced a bill imposing a 5-cent fee on disposable plastic bags, which passed and was signed into law by County Executive Calvin Ball III.

In 2021, Hill introduced legislation that would prohibit homeowner associations from requiring residents to plant turf grass on their property. The bill passed and became law.

=== Health care ===
During her 2014 House of Delegates campaign, Hill said that she would help make the Affordable Care Act a more effective law.

In 2015, Hill introduced legislation that would provide fertility treatment benefits, including in vitro fertilisation coverage, to married lesbian couples.

In January 2018, Hill expressed concerns with legislation to establish a prescription monitoring program for law enforcement, saying that she thought the bill would have a "chilling effect on doctors" and lead them to under-prescribe.

During the 2019 legislative session, Hill introduced legislation that would allow medical professionals to prescribe pre-exposure prophylaxis, an HIV-prevention strategy, to minors, which passed and became law.

During the 2024 legislative session, Hill supported a bill to legalize medical aid in dying for terminally ill patients.

=== Israel ===
During the 2024 legislative session, Hill supported a resolution calling for an immediate and long–term ceasefire in the Gaza war alongside the return of all hostages and delivery of adequate humanitarian aid to the Palestinian people. AIPAC later stated that Hill's and labor lawyer John Morse's stance on Gaza led the lobbying group to spend over $4 million supporting state senator Sarah Elfreth's 2024 congressional campaign.

=== Social issues ===
In September 2017, following the Unite the Right rally, Hill participated in a rally denouncing hate groups and white supremacy in Catonsville. In October 2020, she called for the removal of a mural at the Catonsville Post Office that depicted slavery.

During the 2021 legislative session, Hill introduced a bill to repeal and replace "Maryland, My Maryland" as the state's official anthem.

During the 2023 legislative session, Hill introduced legislation that would prevent Maryland from aiding other states' criminal investigations into patients and providers who receive health care services in the state. The bill passed and was signed into law by Governor Wes Moore.

During the 2024 legislative session, Hill supported bills to regulate artificial intelligence programs.

During the 2026 legislative session, Hill was the only Democrat to vote against the Protecting Arists' Creative Expression Act, which prevents artistic works from being misinterpreted as literal confessions in trials.

== Personal life ==
Hill is a member of St. Bernardine Catholic Church in Baltimore.

== Electoral history ==
Maryland House of Delegates District 12 Democratic primary election, 2014
Party	Candidate	Votes	%
Democratic	Clarence Lam	6,307	21.3
Democratic	Terri L. Hill	6,059	20.5
Democratic	Eric Ebersole	4,427	14.9
Democratic	Rebecca P. Dongarra	3,782	12.8
Democratic	Nick Stewart	2,991	10.1
Democratic	Renee McGuirk-Spence	1,908	6.4
Democratic	Brian S. Bailey	1,576	5.3
Democratic	Michael Gisriel	1,246	4.2
Democratic	Adam Sachs	747	2.5
Democratic	Jay Fred Cohen	580	2.0

Maryland House of Delegates District 12 election, 2014
Party	Candidate	Votes	%
Democratic	Eric Ebersole	19,274	18.9
Democratic	Terri L. Hill	19,236	18.9
Democratic	Clarence Lam	18,568	18.2
Republican	Joseph D."Joe" Hooe	16,171	15.9
Republican	Rick Martel	14,290	14.0
Republican	Gordon Bull	14,146	13.9
Write-in		110	0.1

Maryland House of Delegates District 12 election, 2018
Party	Candidate	Votes	%
Democratic	Eric Ebersole (incumbent)	30,478	22.7
Democratic	Jessica Feldmark	29,427	21.9
Democratic	Terri Hill (incumbent)	29,313	21.8
Republican	Melanie Harris	16,536	12.3
Republican	Bob Cockey	15,141	11.3
Republican	Michael Russell	13,509	10.0
Write-in		126	0.1

Maryland's 7th congressional district Democratic special primary election, 2020
Party	Candidate	Votes	%
Democratic	Kweisi Mfume	31,415	43.0
Democratic	Maya Rockeymoore Cummings	12,524	17.1
Democratic	Jill P. Carter	11,708	16.0
Democratic	Terri Hill	5,439	7.4
Democratic	F. Michael Higginbotham	3,245	4.4
Democratic	Harry Spikes	2,572	3.5
Democratic	Saafir Rabb	1,327	1.8
Democratic	Jay Jalisi	1,257	1.7
Democratic	Talmadge Branch	810	1.1
Democratic	Mark Steven Gosnell	579	0.8
Democratic	T. Dan Baker	377	0.5
Democratic	Charles Stokes	297	0.4
Democratic	Paul V. Konka	251	0.3
Democratic	Darryl Gonzalez	245	0.3
Democratic	Alicia D. Brown	180	0.2
Democratic	Leslie E. Grant	176	0.2
Democratic	Anthony Carter, Sr.	155	0.2
Democratic	Jay Fred Cohen	150	0.2
Democratic	Matko Lee Chullin, III	79	0.1
Democratic	Charles U. Smith	75	0.1
Democratic	Adrian Petrus	60	0.1
Democratic	Nathaniel M. Costley, Sr.	49	0.1
Democratic	Jermyn Davidson	31	0.0
Democratic	Dan Hiegel	31	0.0

Maryland House of Delegates District 12A election, 2022
Party	Candidate	Votes	%
Democratic	Terri Hill (incumbent)	24,204	53.1
Democratic	Jessica Feldmark (incumbent)	20,674	45.3
Write-in		745	1.6

Maryland's 3rd congressional district Democratic primary results, 2024
Party	Candidate	Votes	%
Democratic	Sarah Elfreth	29,459	36.2
Democratic	Harry Dunn	20,380	25.0
Democratic	Clarence Lam	9,548	11.7
Democratic	Terri Hill	5,318	6.5
Democratic	Mark Chang	4,106	5.0
Democratic	Aisha Khan	2,199	2.7
Democratic	Mike Rogers	2,147	2.6
Democratic	John Morse	1,447	1.8
Democratic	Abigail Diehl	1,379	1.7
Democratic	Lindsay Donahue	1,213	1.5
Democratic	Juan Dominguez	1,205	1.3
Democratic	Michael Coburn (withdrawn)	583	0.7
Democratic	Malcolm Thomas Colombo	527	0.7
Democratic	Don Quinn	408	0.5
Democratic	Kristin Lyman Nabors	397	0.5
Democratic	Jeff Woodard	352	0.4
Democratic	Gary Schuman	286	0.4
Democratic	Mark Gosnell	221	0.3
Democratic	Jake Pretot	162	0.2
Democratic	Matt Libber	159	0.2
Democratic	Stewart Silver	78	0.1
Democratic	Danny Rupli	34	<0.1
