= Eric Ebersole =

American politician (born 1958)

Eric D. Ebersole
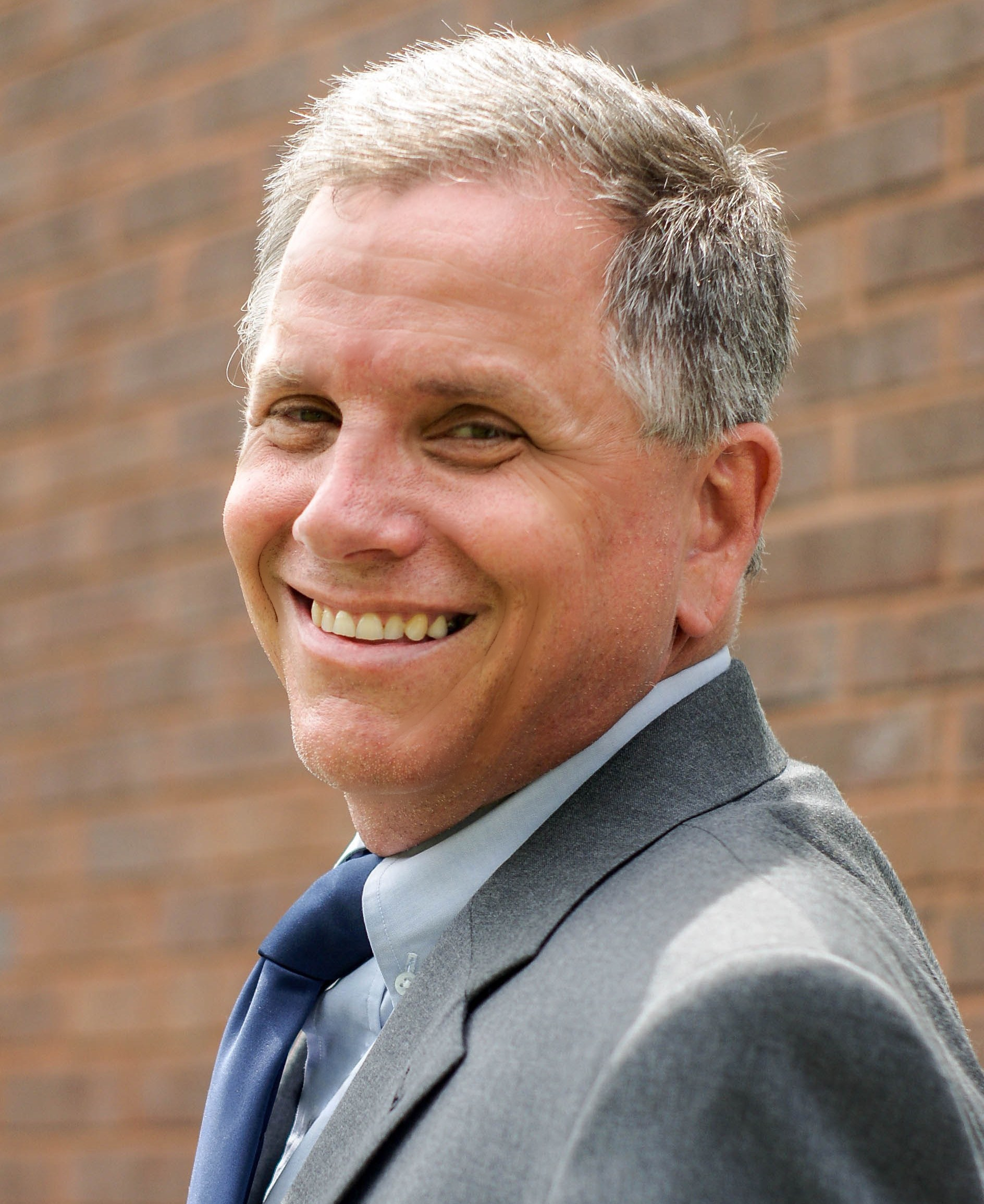

Member of the Maryland House of Delegates
- Incumbent
- Assumed office January 14, 2015
- Preceded by: Steven J. DeBoy Sr. (12A), James E. Malone Jr. (12A), and Elizabeth Bobo (12B)
- Constituency: 12th district (2015–2023); District 44A (2023–present)

Personal details
- Born: Eric Douglas Ebersole; May 20, 1958 (age 68) Baltimore, Maryland, U.S.
- Party: Democratic
- Spouse: Married
- Children: 3
- Education: Catonsville High School
- Alma mater: University of Maryland College Park (BS, MS)
- Profession: Retired Teacher

Eric Douglas Ebersole (born May 20, 1958) is an American politician who serves as a Delegate to the Maryland General Assembly representing District 44A. From 2015 to 2023, he represented the 12th District.

== Early life and career ==
Ebersole was born in Baltimore, Maryland on May 20, 1958, and grew up in Catonsville. He attended the University of Maryland, College Park, earning a B.S. degree in mathematics education in 1980 and an M.S. degree in the same field in 1986.

After graduating, Ebersole worked for more than three decades as a high school math teacher in Howard County, at Wilde Lake, Marriotts Ridge, and Reservoir High Schools. He also served as an adjunct instructor in mathematics education at the University of Maryland, Baltimore County. Among the awards Ebersole won during his time as a teacher was his selection as Outstanding Secondary Mathematics Teachers of the Year in 1987 by the Maryland Council of Teachers of Mathematics and his selection as Wilde Lake High School's Teacher of the Year in 2002.

In addition to his work as a classroom teacher, Ebersole was actively involved in a number of professional and community organizations. He was a member of the Maryland Council of Teachers of Mathematics and served in a number of leadership roles in that organization. In addition he volunteered with the Catonsville Chamber of Commerce, is a life member of the Catonsville Historical Society, and served in a number of leadership roles in the Catonsville Presbyterian Church.. He has served on the Board of the Western Y. He is currently a board member of the non-profit Friends of Patapsco Valley State Park and works to secure state grants for improvements to the Park.

Following redistricting in 2010, the three incumbent legislators representing District 12, which had formerly been divided into two sub-districts, chose not to run for re-election. Ebersole ran for the seat in a crowded primary field, and was elected alongside Terri Hill and Clarence Lam as an all-freshman delegation to the General Assembly.

== In the legislature ==
Ebersole was sworn into the Maryland House of Delegates on January 14, 2015. Since 2022, he has served as Deputy Majority Whip. He has filed to run for re-election in 2022.

In October 2015, Speaker of the Maryland House of Delegates Michael E. Busch appointed Ebersole to a commission to study the use of standardized testing in the state's public schools. The commission submitted its final recommendations, which included reducing the length and testing units for the PARCC test and giving assessments during regular class time, on July 7, 2016.

=== Committee assignments ===
- Member, Ways and Means Committee, 2015- (education subcommittee, 2015-; election law subcommittee, 2015–17; revenues subcommittee, 2017–18; chair, racing and gaming subcommittee, 2019, member, 2015–19, 2021-; chair, early childhood subcommittee, 2020-2022 member 2022- ; chair, education subcommittee 2022-
- Joint Committee on Children, Youth, and Families, 2015- ; Adviory Board, Maryland Commission on School Safety, 2021 - ; Board, Consortium on Coordinated Community Supports (school mental health) 2024- ;Board, Interagency Coordinating Commission on Childcare and Early Education 2021-; Commissioner and Steering Committee, Education Commision of States, 2020- ; Legislative Advisory Council, Southern Regional Education Board 2020-;

=== Other memberships ===
- House Chair, Baltimore County Delegation, 2023–26
- Member, Maryland Legislative Transit Caucus, 2019-

== Political positions ==
=== Education ===
Ebersole introduced legislation in the 2015 legislative session that would create a commission to survey and assess how much time is spent on testing in each grade level and each school system. The bill passed and became law on May 12, 2015.

Ebersole introduced legislation in the 2019 legislative session that would require the appointment of a full-time teacher and parent of a public school student to the Maryland State Board of Education. The bill passed and became law without Governor Larry Hogan's signature on May 28, 2019.

Ebersole introduced legislation in the 2021 legislative session that would require the Maryland State Department of Education to keep track of the number of students restrained or placed in seclusion. The bill unanimously passed the House of Delegates. He later introduced legislation in the 2022 legislative session that would ban the use of seclusion in public Maryland schools. The bill passed and became law on April 9, 2022.

=== Immigration ===
In July 2019, Ebersole attended and spoke at a rally outside the office of U.S. Representative Elijah Cummings to urge Cummings to protest against the immigration policy of Donald Trump. During the 2026 legislative session, he introduced a bill that would prohibit public school security personnel from aiding U.S. Immigration and Customs Enforcement in investigating students and faculty on school property.

=== Social issues ===
During the 2021 legislative session, Ebersole introduced a bill that would require school systems to allow students to participate in peaceful demonstrations. The bill passed the House of Delegates by a vote of 97-39.

== Personal life ==
Ebersole is married and has three children. He attends religious services at the Catonsville Presbyterian Church, where he was previously a deacon, youth leader, and Light Street soup kitchen food server.

== Electoral history ==
Maryland House of Delegates District 12 Democratic Primary Election, 2014
Party	Candidate	Votes	%
Democratic	Clarence Lam	6,307	21.3%
Democratic	Terri Hill	6,059	21.3%
Democratic	Eric Ebersole	4,427	14.9%
Democratic	Rebecca P. Dongarra	3,782	12.8%
Democratic	Nick Stewart	2,991	10.1%
Democratic	Renee McGuirk-Spence	1,908	6.4%
Democratic	Brian S. Bailey	1,576	5.3%
Democratic	Michael Gisriel	1,246	4.2%
Democratic	Adam Sachs	747	2.5%
Democratic	Jay Fred Cohen	580	2.0%

Maryland House of Delegates District 12 General Election, 2014
Party	Candidate	Votes	%
Democratic	Eric Ebersole	19,274	18.9%
Democratic	Terri L. Hill	19,236	18.9%
Democratic	Clarence K. Lam	18,568	18.2%
Republican	Joseph D. "Joe" Hooe	16,171	15.9%
Republican	Rick Martel	14,290	14.0%
Republican	Gordon Bull	14,146	13.9%
N/A	Other Write-Ins	110	0.1%

Maryland House of Delegates District 12 Democratic Primary Election, 2018
Party	Candidate	Votes	%
Democratic	Terri Hill	9,920	29.9%
Democratic	Eric Ebersole	9,326	28.1%
Democratic	Jessica Feldmark	7,104	21.4%
Democratic	Mark Weaver	1,943	5.9%
Democratic	Dario J. Broccolino	1,896	5.7%
Democratic	James Howard	1,283	3.9%
Democratic	Malcolm J. Heflin	892	2.7%
Democratic	Jonathan Bratt	793	2.4%

Maryland House of Delegates District 12 General Election, 2018
Party	Candidate	Votes	%
Democratic	Eric Ebersole	30,478	22.7%
Democratic	Jessica Feldmark	29,427	21.9%
Democratic	Terri Hill	29,313	21.8%
Republican	Melanie Harris	16,536	12.3%
Republican	Bob Cockey	15,141	11.3%
Republican	Michael Russel	13,509	10.0%
N/A	Other Write-Ins	126	0.1%
