= Healthy Howard =

Healthy Howard is a county-sponsored health care program offered to certain uninsured residents of Howard County, Maryland. The program, which provides doctors visits and prescription drugs, has been nationally hailed as a model to offer health care to local lower income people without health insurance.

The program started on October 1, 2008, with a plan to accommodate 2,200 people in a salary range of $35,000 to $63,600 for a family of four. Plans were to increase this number by 2000 enrollees each year thereafter.

Services are also offered to those who become unemployed.

== Details ==
The program is open to those who make between 117% and 300% of the federal poverty income level and are not eligible for Medicaid. It costs between $50 and $80 monthly, and it provides physician visits and prescription drugs.

It is not considered a health insurance program and does not cover any care received outside the boundaries of Howard County.

The program, which costs $2.8 million annually to operate, is funded with a combination of premiums, county funds, and private donations

== Issues ==
The program has shown to be difficult to sell, falling below expectations. Initially, the county had presumed that they would need to hold a lottery to determine which of the county's 15,000 uninsured residents would be getting its 2,200 slots.

It was found that many when they attempted to sign up for the Healthy Howard program were actually eligible for other health care programs.

== Future ==
It has been predicted that if national health care reform is passed, there will be no need for Healthy Howard to continue. Some, however, believe the program can be converted into a health insurance plan.
