= Jessica Feldmark =

American politician (born 1974)

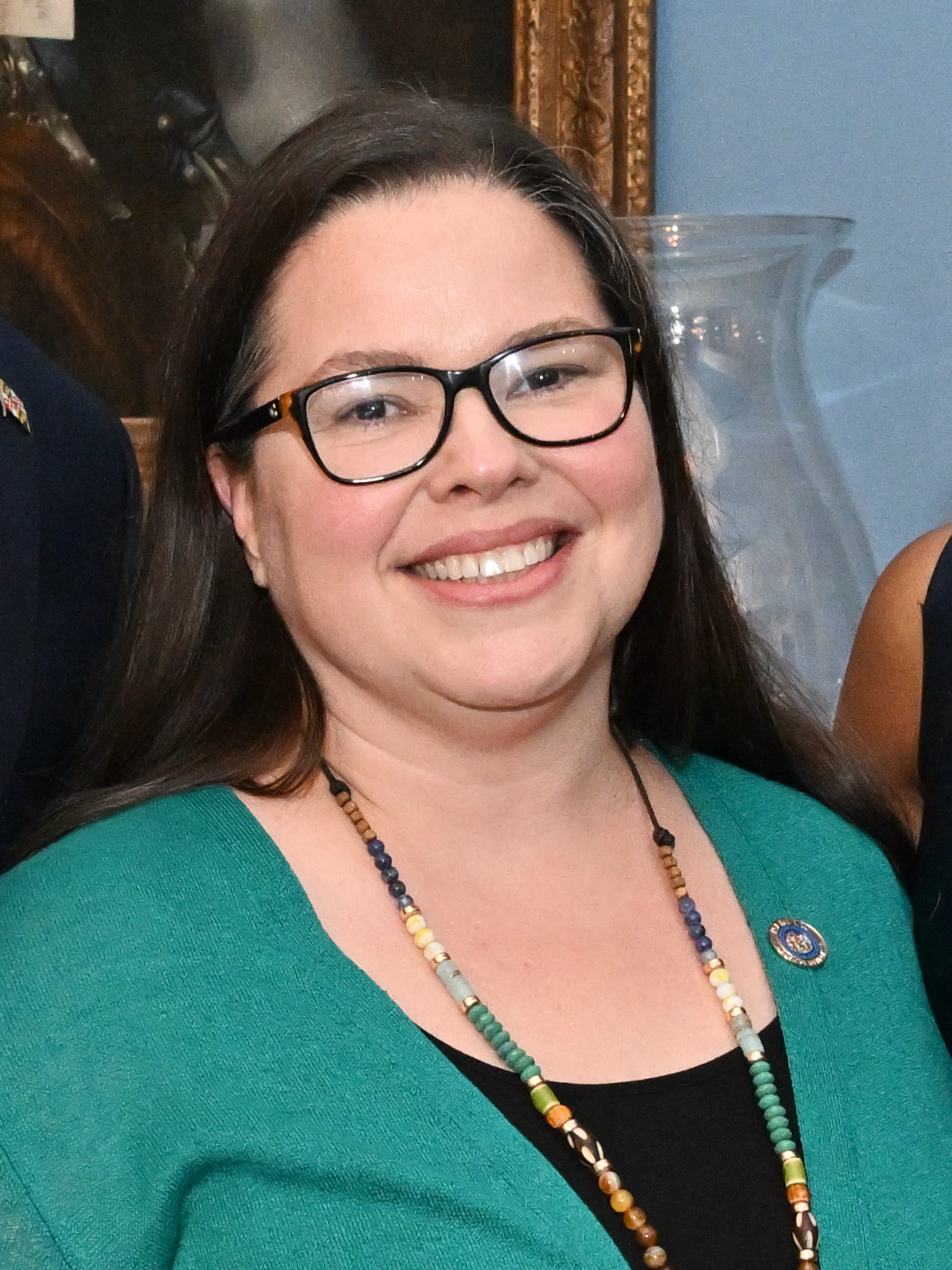
- Feldmark in 2023

Member of the Maryland House of Delegates
- Incumbent
- Assumed office January 9, 2019 Serving with Terri Hill
- Preceded by: Clarence Lam
- Constituency: District 12 (2019–2023); District 12A (2023–present)

Personal details
- Born: Jessica Marie Page; August 1, 1974 (age 52)
- Party: Democratic
- Spouse: Joshua Feldmark
- Education: Goucher College (BA); American University (MS)
- Website: Official website

Jessica Marie Feldmark (née Page; born August 1, 1974) is an American politician who has served as a Democratic member of the Maryland House of Delegates since 2019.

== Early life and career ==
Feldmark was born on August 1, 1974. She attended Goucher College, where she earned a B.A. degree in sociology and international relations, and American University, where she earned a M.S. degree in organization development. She moved to Columbia, Maryland in 1998 and was elected to the Wilde Lake Village Board in 2000. She resigned from the board in November 2002 to become a special assistant to Howard County councilman-elect Kenneth Ulman. Feldmark followed Ulman into the executive's office following his election in 2006, first serving as a senior advisor until 2009, when she became Ulman's chief of staff.

Following the election of Howard County executive Allan Kittleman in 2014, Feldmark was let go from her position to make room for Kittleman chief of staff Diane Wilson. A few hours after her departure, the Howard County Council announced that Feldmark would serve as the council's administrator, replacing Sheila Tolliver.

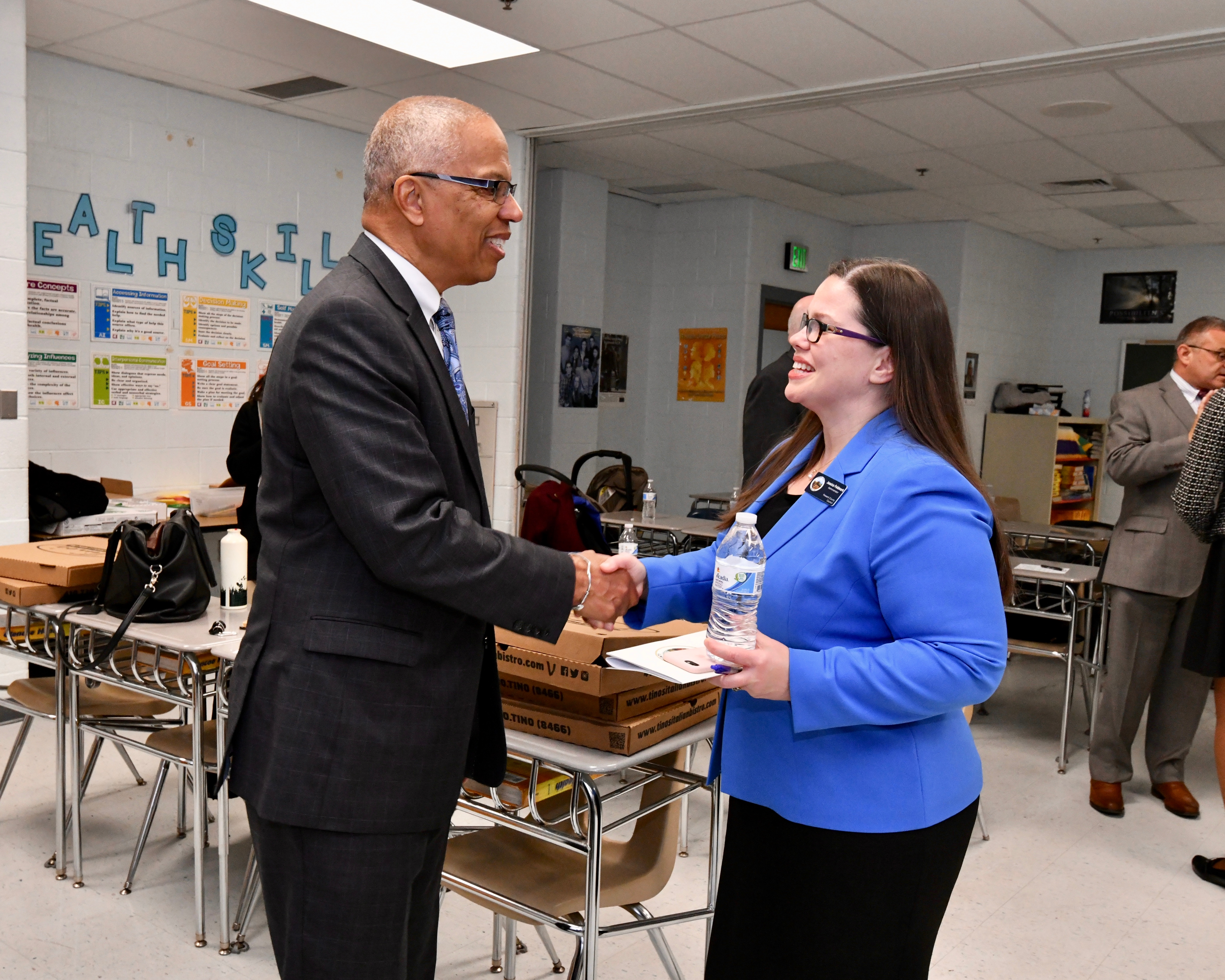
Feldmark with Lieutenant Governor Boyd Rutherford in 2018

In February 2018, Feldmark filed to run for Maryland House of Delegates. She came in third place in the Democratic primary election, receiving 21.4 percent of the vote. Feldmark came in second place in the general election, receiving 21.9 percent of the vote.

== In the legislature ==
Feldmark was sworn into the Maryland House of Delegates on January 9, 2019. She has been a member of the Ways and Means Committee during her entire tenure, including as the committee's vice chair since December 2025. Feldmark is also a member of the Howard County Delegation—serving as its chair from 2020 to 2021 and from 2023 to 2024—the Women Legislators of Maryland, the Maryland Legislative Latino Caucus, the Maryland Legislative Transit Caucus, and the Maryland Legislative Jewish Caucus.

In January 2020, Feldmark filed to run as a convention delegate for Elizabeth Warren at the 2020 Democratic National Convention.

On June 10, 2025, Feldmark announced that she would run for Howard County Executive in 2026, seeking to succeed incumbent Calvin Ball III, who is term-limited. During her campaign, she ran on a platform of increasing county funding for education and bringing jobs to the county. In December 2025, Feldmark withdrew from the race and announced that she would instead be running for re-election to the House of Delegates after being diagnosed with breast cancer.

== Political positions ==
=== Electoral reform ===
During the 2020 legislative session, Feldmark introduced a bill that would expand Maryland's public financing program to candidates other than the governor in statewide elections.

During the 2021 legislative session, Feldmark introduced legislation that would introduce universal ballot marking devices and prevent ballots cast by voters with disabilities from being set apart from ballots cast by voters without disabilities. She also introduced legislation that would codify a temporary policy adopted by the Maryland State Board of Elections during the COVID-19 pandemic that would require local election boards to accept an absentee ballot and reject a provisional ballot if they received both from the same voter.

=== Government shutdown ===
During the 2019 legislative session and amid the 2018–2019 United States federal government shutdown, Feldmark introduced a bill that allow essential government employees to receive temporary assistance through the state during future government shutdowns. The bill passed and was signed into law by Governor Larry Hogan on March 26, 2019.

=== Social issues ===
In July 2020, Feldmark and 12 other state legislators signed onto a letter urging the Baltimore County Board of Education to ban the display of hate symbols, including the Confederate flag and swastikas, in schools across Baltimore County unless it is necessary for educational programming.

=== Taxes ===
During the 2021 legislative session, Feldmark introduced a bill to alter the state's Job Creation Tax Credit program to require new positions that qualify for the credit to pay a local prevailing wage of 150 percent of the state's minimum wage and provide career advancement opportunities, paid leave, and collective bargaining rights. The bill passed, but was vetoed by Governor Hogan on May 28, 2021; the legislature voted to override Hogan's veto on the bill during its 2021 legislative session.

== Personal life ==
Feldmark is married to Joshua Feldmark, who is the former director of community sustainability for the Howard County government. She is Jewish.

== Electoral history ==
2018 Maryland House of Delegates District 12 election
Primary election
Party	Candidate	Votes	%
Democratic	Terri Hill (incumbent)	9,920	29.9
Democratic	Eric Ebersole (incumbent)	9,326	28.1
Democratic	Jessica Feldmark	7,104	21.4
Democratic	Mark Weaver	1,943	5.9
Democratic	Dario J. Broccolino	1,896	5.7
Democratic	James Howard	1,283	3.9
Democratic	Malcolm J. Heflin	892	2.7
Democratic	Jonathan Bratt	793	2.4
Total votes		33,157	100.0
General election
Democratic	Eric Ebersole (incumbent)	30,478	22.7
Democratic	Jessica Feldmark	29,427	21.9
Democratic	Terri Hill (incumbent)	29,313	21.8
Republican	Melanie Harris	16,536	12.3
Republican	Bob Cockey	15,141	11.3
Republican	Michael Russell	13,509	10.0
Write-in		126	0.1
Total votes		134,530	100.0

2022 Maryland House of Delegates District 12A election
Primary election
Party	Candidate	Votes	%
Democratic	Terri Hill (incumbent)	9,107	47.2
Democratic	Jessica Feldmark (incumbent)	8,619	44.7
Democratic	Christopher John Feldwick	1,561	8.1
Total votes		19,287	100.0
General election
Democratic	Terri Hill (incumbent)	24,204	53.1
Democratic	Jessica Feldmark (incumbent)	20,674	45.3
Write-in		745	1.6
Total votes		45,623	100.0
