= Elizabeth Bobo =

American politician (born 1943)

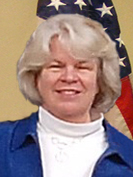

Member of the Maryland House of Delegates from the 12B district
- In office January 11, 1995 – January 14, 2015
- Preceded by: Kenneth H. Masters; Louis P. Morsberger
- Succeeded by: Eric Ebersole, Terri Hill, Clarence Lam
- Constituency: Howard County

5th County Executive of Howard County, Maryland
- In office December 1, 1986 – December 3, 1990
- Preceded by: William E. Eckel
- Succeeded by: Charles I. Ecker

Member, Howard County Council
- In office October 1977 – December 1, 1986

Personal details
- Born: December 21, 1943 (age 82) Baltimore, Maryland, U.S.
- Party: Democratic
- Spouse: Lloyd G. Knowles
- Education: Seton High School; University of Maryland University College (BA); University of Maryland School of Law (JD)
- Occupation: Attorney

Elizabeth Bobo (born December 21, 1943) is an American politician from Maryland and a member of the Democratic Party. She served as Howard County Executive and in the Maryland House of Delegates. Bobo was the first and only female Howard County Executive, serving from 1986 to 1990.

== Early life and law career ==
Bobo was born in Baltimore on December 21, 1943. She graduated from Seton High School in Baltimore before earning a Bachelor of Arts degree in literature from the University of Maryland University College and a Juris Doctor degree from the University of Maryland School of Law. Bobo was admitted to the Maryland Bar in 1992 and practiced as an attorney before her election to the House of Delegates.

== Political career ==
Bobo served one term as Howard County Executive from 1986 to 1990. She was Howard County's first and only female executive. In 1987, Bobo partnered with developer Kingdon Gould III to form a business outreach program. Charles I. Ecker defeated Bobo's bid for reelection as county executive in 1990. In 1993, Bobo married former planning board member and councilperson Lloyd G. Knowles.

In 1994, Bobo was elected to the Maryland House of Delegates. She served four terms there, representing District 12B in Howard County.

As a member of the House of Delegates, Bobo voted in favor of increasing the sales tax whilst simultaneously reducing income tax rates for some income brackets in the Tax Reform Act of 2007 (HB2). She voted in favor of in-state tuition for illegal immigrants in 2007 (HB6). She served on the Environmental Matters Committee, and was noted for distinguishing herself as an advocate for protection of the natural environment.

During the 2008 Democratic presidential primaries, Bobo supported the candidacy of Barack Obama. She served as one of the state's ten electors pledged to Obama in the general election, and cast her vote for him along with the other nine on December 15.

In 2012, Bobo announced her decision not to seek reelection in 2014.
