= Robert A. Zarnoch =

Judge of the Maryland Court of Special Appeals from 2008 to 2015

Judge of the Maryland Court of Special Appeals from the at-large circuit
- In office February 27, 2008 – September 19, 2015
- Nominated by: Martin O'Malley

Personal details
- Born: September 15, 1945 (age 80) Baltimore, Maryland
- Education: Loyola University Maryland (BA); American University (MA); Georgetown University Law Center (JD)

Robert A. Zarnoch (born September 19, 1945) is an American lawyer and judge who served as a judge of the Maryland Court of Special Appeals (now the Appellate Court of Maryland) from 2008 to 2015. After mandatory retirement, he was recalled by the Court to serve as a Senior Judge and has served on the Court for ten more years.

== Biography ==
Zarnoch was born September 19, 1945, in Baltimore, Maryland. He received a Bachelor of Arts in English from Loyola University Maryland in 1967, a Master of Arts in journalism from American University in 1969, and a Juris Doctor from Georgetown University Law Center, where he edited The Georgetown Law Journal from 1973 to 1974, in 1974. He was also a member of the United States Army Reserve from 1968 to 1976.

Zarnoch's legal career began as a clerk for chief judge of the Maryland Court of Appeals (now the Supreme Court of Maryland) Robert C. Murphy from 1974 to 1975. He was admitted to the Maryland and Washington, D.C., bars in 1974 and 1975, respectively. He served in the office of the attorney general of Maryland, first as an assistant in the civil division from 1977 to 1979 then as a counsel to the Maryland General Assembly from 1979 to 2008. He was the chair of the Maryland State Bar Association's Administrative Law Section from 1992 to 1993.

Zarnoch was appointed as an at-large judge of the Court of Special Appeals on February 27, 2008. As a judge, Zarnoch served as chair of the Washington Suburban Sanitary Commission Law Review Committee from 2008 to 2010, a member of the Code Revision Committee from 2008 to 2015, chair of the General Provisions Article Review Committee from 2012 to 2014, and vice-chair of the Standing Committee on Rules of Practice and Procedure from 2012 to 2015. He reached the mandatory retirement age of 70 on September 19, 2015.

Zarnoch was an adjunct professor at the University of Maryland School of Law, University of Baltimore School of Law and Towson State University and a lecturer to the Judicial Institute of Maryland. As an appellate judge, he authored more than 600 opinions. Among his notable cases was Prince George's County v.Longtin, which was the first appellate decision to recognize a cause of action under the Maryland Constitution for a pattern or practice of police misconduct. He also authored an opinion that held that a county law regulating the use of pesticides was not preempted by state law. In his spare time, he wrote a novel, The Earl King, which was published in 2022.
