= Maryland Legislative District 12 =

American legislative district

Maryland's legislative district 12
- Represents parts of Anne Arundel County and Howard County
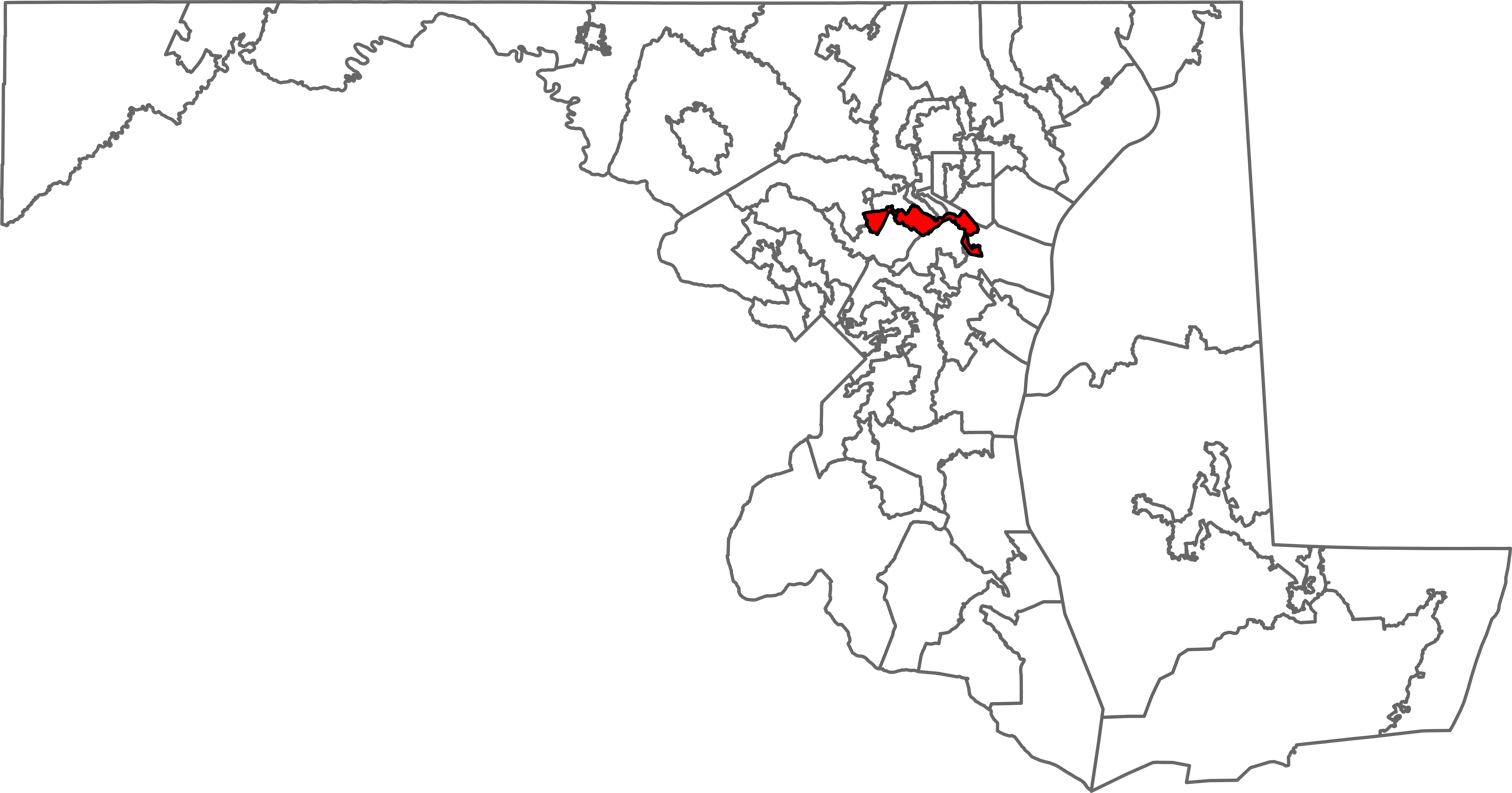
- Senator: Clarence K. Lam (D)
- Delegate(s): Jessica M. Feldmark (D) (District 12A); Terri L. Hill (D) (District 12A); Gary Simmons (D) (District 12B)
- Registration: 54.5% Democratic; 23.0% Republican; 20.7% unaffiliated
- Demographics: 53.5% White; 21.1% Black/African American; 0.4% Native American; 11.6% Asian; 0.1% Hawaiian/Pacific Islander; 5.0% Other race; 8.3% Two or more races; 9.4% Hispanic
- Population (2020): 130,272
- Voting-age population: 101,992
- Registered voters: 83,011

Maryland Legislative District 12 is one of 47 districts in the state for the Maryland General Assembly. It covers parts of Anne Arundel County and Howard County.

== Demographic characteristics ==
As of the 2020 United States census, the district had a population of 130,272, of whom 101,992 (78.3%) were of voting age. The racial makeup of the district was 69,722 (53.5%) White, 27,474 (21.1%) African American, 571 (0.4%) Native American, 15,056 (11.6%) Asian, 69 (0.1%) Pacific Islander, 6,522 (5.0%) from some other race, and 10,851 (8.3%) from two or more races. Hispanic or Latino of any race were 12,261 (9.4%) of the population.

The district had 83,011 registered voters as of October 17, 2020, of whom 17,218 (20.7%) were registered as unaffiliated, 19,094 (23.0%) were registered as Republicans, 45,268 (54.5%) were registered as Democrats, and 895 (1.1%) were registered to other parties.

== Political representation ==
The district is represented for the 2023–2027 legislative term in the State Senate by Clarence K. Lam (D) and in the House of Delegates by Jessica M. Feldmark (D, District 12A), Terri L. Hill (D, District 12A), and Gary Simmons (D, District 12B).

== Election history ==
=== Multi-member Senate district (1967–1975) ===
Years	Senator	Party	Electoral history	Years	Senator	Party	Electoral history
January 18, 1967 – August 12, 1974	William L. Hodges	Democratic	Redistricted from Baltimore City's 6th district and re-elected in 1966. Re-elected in 1970. Died on August 12, 1974.	January 18, 1967 – January 8, 1975	Harry J. McGuirk	Democratic	Elected in 1966. Re-elected in 1970. Redistricted to the 37th district.
October 12, 1974 – January 8, 1975	Joan Vane	Democratic	Appointed to finish Hodges's term. Retired.	January 18, 1967 – January 8, 1975	Harry J. McGuirk	Democratic	Elected in 1966. Re-elected in 1970. Redistricted to the 37th district.

=== Single-member Senate district (1975–present) ===
Years	Senator	Party	Electoral history
January 8, 1975 – January 12, 1983	Melvin A. Steinberg	Democratic	Redistricted from the 13th district and re-elected in 1974. Re-elected in 1978. Redistricted to the 11th district.
January 12, 1983 – May 8, 1989	John C. Coolahan	Democratic	Elected in 1982. Re-elected in 1986. Resigned to become a judge on the Baltimore County Circuit Court.
June 3, 1989 – January 11, 1995	Nancy L. Murphy	Democratic	Appointed to serve the remainder of Coolahan's term. Elected in 1990. Lost renomination.
January 11, 1995 – January 9, 2019	Edward J. Kasemeyer	Democratic	Elected in 1994. Re-elected in 1998. Re-elected in 2002. Re-elected in 2006. Re-elected in 2010. Re-elected in 2014. Retired.
January 9, 2019 – present	Clarence Lam	Democratic	Elected in 2018. Re-elected in 2022. Re-elected in 2026.
