= Edward J. Kasemeyer =

American politician

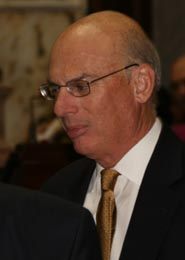
- Edward J. Kasemeyer (2009)

Member of the Maryland Senate
- In office January 11, 1995 – January 9, 2019
- Preceded by: Nancy L. Murphy
- Succeeded by: Clarence Lam
- Constituency: 12th district
- In office January 14, 1987 – January 1991
- Preceded by: James Clark Jr.
- Succeeded by: Christopher J. McCabe
- Constituency: 14th district

Member of the Maryland House of Delegates from District 14B
- In office January 12, 1983 – January 14, 1987 Serving with Robert H. Kittleman
- Succeeded by: Robert L. Flanagan
- Preceded by: Anne E. Baker; Hugh Burgess

Personal details
- Born: July 18, 1945 (age 81) Baltimore, Maryland
- Party: Democratic
- Children: 5
- Education: Western Maryland College, (BA)

Edward J. Kasemeyer (born July 18, 1945) is an American politician from Maryland and a member of the Democratic Party. He served for many years in the Maryland State Senate, most recently representing Maryland's district 12 in Baltimore and Howard counties.

== Background ==
Born in Baltimore, Maryland, on July 18, 1945, Kasemeyer attended Western Maryland College. He has been active with the Howard County Association for Retarded Citizens, the Howard County Chamber of Commerce, and the Howard County General Hospital Advisory Board, as well as in the Democratic Party.

== In the legislature ==
Kasemeyer first served in the Senate as a representative of the 14th district from January 1987 to January 1991, after a single term in the Maryland House of Delegates (elected 1982; served January 1983 to January 1987). Running for re-election to the Senate in 1990, he narrowly lost to Republican Christopher J. McCabe. After redistricting changed the district boundaries, he was elected again to the Senate in 1994, this time from the 12th district. He was re-elected five times. During part of his tenure, Kasemeyer served as the Chair of the Budget and Taxation Committee.
