= Montgomery County Delegation =

Delegation in the Maryland General Assembly

The Montgomery County Delegation refers to the Maryland state delegates and senators who are elected from legislative districts in Montgomery County, Maryland to serve in the Maryland General Assembly, consisting of the Montgomery County House Delegation and the Montgomery County Senate Delegation.

== Authority and responsibilities ==
The delegation is responsible for representing the interests, needs and concerns of the citizens of Montgomery County in the Maryland General Assembly. The delegation considers local and bi-county legislation, that is, Maryland state bills that have effect only in Montgomery County or, in the case of legislation that relates to land use and the functions of the bi-county Maryland-National Capital Parks and Planning Commission, in both Montgomery and Prince George's Counties. The delegation has four committees, the Economic Development Committee; Education, Elections, and Housing Committee; Land Use, Transportation, and Public Safety Committee; and Metro Washington Area Committee, which review local and bi-county legislation within their areas of responsibility.

== 2019-22 members ==
District	Counties represented	Delegate	Party	Member Since	Committee
14	Montgomery	Anne R. Kaiser	Democratic	2003	Ways and Means
14	Montgomery	Pamela Queen	Democratic	2016	Economic Matters
14	Montgomery	Eric Luedtke	Democratic	2011	Ways and Means
15	Montgomery	David Fraser-Hidalgo	Democratic	2013	Environment and Transportation
15	Montgomery	Linda Foley	Democratic	2021	Environment and Transportation
15	Montgomery	Lily Qi	Democratic	2019	Economic Matters
16	Montgomery	Ariana Kelly	Democratic	2011	Health and Government Operations
16	Montgomery	Marc Korman	Democratic	2015	Appropriations
16	Montgomery	Sara Love	Democratic	2019	Environment and Transportation
17	Montgomery	Kumar P. Barve	Democratic	1991	Environment and Transportation
17	Montgomery	James W. Gilchrist	Democratic	2007	Environment and Transportation
17	Montgomery	Julie Palakovich Carr	Democratic	2019	Ways and Means
18	Montgomery	Emily Shetty	Democratic	2019	Judiciary
18	Montgomery	Alfred C. Carr, Jr.	Democratic	2007	Health and Government Operations
18	Montgomery	Jared Solomon	Democratic	2019	Appropriations
19	Montgomery	Bonnie Cullison	Democratic	2011	Health and Government Operations
19	Montgomery	Charlotte Crutchfield	Democratic	2019	Judiciary
19	Montgomery	Vaughn Stewart	Democratic	2019	Environment and Transportation
20	Montgomery	David Moon	Democratic	2015	Judiciary
20	Montgomery	Lorig Charkoudian	Democratic	2019	Economic Matters
20	Montgomery	Jheanelle Wilkins	Democratic	2017	Ways and Means
39	Montgomery	Gabriel Acevero	Democratic	2019	Appropriations
39	Montgomery	Kirill Reznik	Democratic	2007	Appropriations
39	Montgomery	Lesley Lopez	Democratic	2019	Judiciary

== See also ==
- Current members of the Maryland State Senate
