= Maryland Legislative District 14 =

American legislative district

Maryland's legislative district 14
- Represents part of Montgomery County
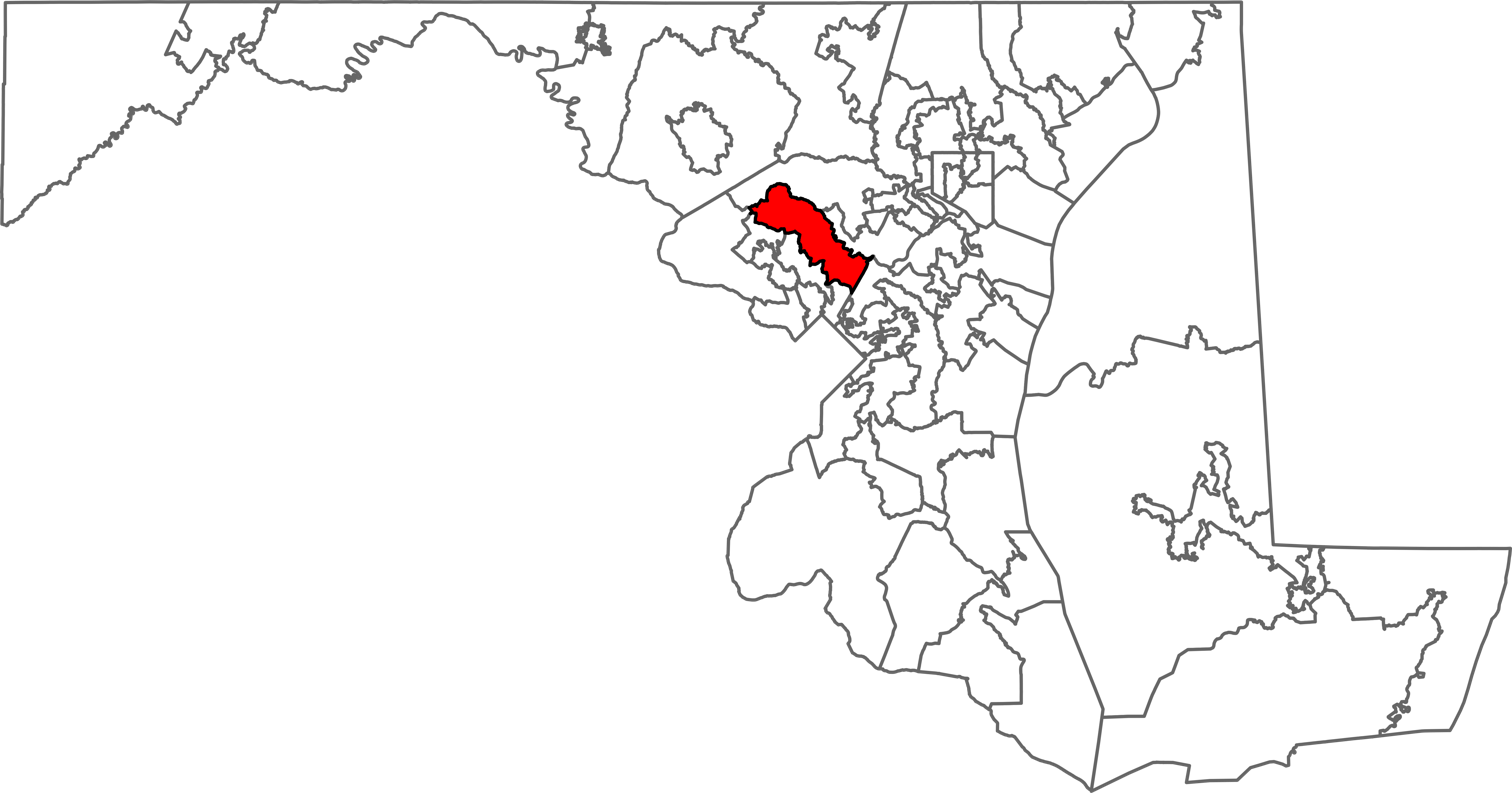
- Senator: Craig J. Zucker (D)
- Delegate(s): Anne R. Kaiser (D); Bernice Mireku-North (D); Pamela E. Queen (D)
- Registration: 56.7% Democratic; 21.5% Republican; 20.6% unaffiliated
- Demographics: 43.4% White; 27.1% Black/African American; 0.4% Native American; 12.4% Asian; 0.0% Hawaiian/Pacific Islander; 6.8% Other race; 9.7% Two or more races; 14.1% Hispanic
- Population (2020): 130,784
- Voting-age population: 101,203
- Registered voters: 93,228

Maryland Legislative District 14 is one of 47 districts in the state for the Maryland General Assembly. It covers part of Montgomery County. The district is represented by three delegates in the Maryland House of Delegates.

== Demographic characteristics ==
As of the 2020 United States census, the district had a population of 130,784, of whom 101,203 (77.4%) were of voting age. The racial makeup of the district was 56,800 (43.4%) White, 35,475 (27.1%) African American, 588 (0.4%) Native American, 16,160 (12.4%) Asian, 50 (0.0%) Pacific Islander, 8,934 (6.8%) from some other race, and 12,741 (9.7%) from two or more races. Hispanic or Latino of any race were 18,392 (14.1%) of the population.

The district had 93,228 registered voters as of October 17, 2020, of whom 19,215 (20.6%) were registered as unaffiliated, 20,010 (21.5%) were registered as Republicans, 52,824 (56.7%) were registered as Democrats, and 733 (0.8%) were registered to other parties.

== Political representation ==
The district is represented for the 2023–2027 legislative term in the State Senate by Craig Zucker (D) and in the House of Delegates by Anne R. Kaiser (D), Bernice Mireku-North (D), and Pamela E. Queen (D).

== Election history ==
| Years | Senator | Party | Electoral history |
|---|---|---|---|
| January 18, 1967 – January 8, 1975 | William S. James | Democratic | Redistricted from Harford County at-large and re-elected in 1966. Re-elected in 1970. Retired. |
| January 8, 1975 – January 14, 1987 | James Clark Jr. | Democratic | Elected in 1974. Re-elected in 1978. Re-elected in 1982. Retired. |
| January 14, 1987 – January 9, 1991 | Edward J. Kasemeyer | Democratic | Elected in 1986. Lost re-election. |
| January 14, 1987 – January 7, 2002 | Christopher J. McCabe | Republican | Elected in 1990. Re-elected in 1994. Re-elected in 1998. Resigned. |
| January 11, 2002 – January 8, 2003 | Robert H. Kittleman | Republican | Appointed to serve the remainder of McCabe's term. Redistricted to the 9th district. |
| January 8, 2003 – January 12, 2011 | Rona E. Kramer | Democratic | Elected in 2002. Re-elected in 2006. Lost renomination. |
| January 12, 2011 – January 1, 2016 | Karen S. Montgomery | Democratic | Elected in 2010. Re-elected in 2014. Resigned. |
| February 4, 2016 – present | Craig Zucker | Democratic | Appointed to serve the remainder of Montgomery's term. Elected in 2018. Re-elected in 2022. Re-elected in 2026. |
