= Senator Kittleman =

Senator Kittleman may refer to:

- Allan H. Kittleman (born 1958), Maryland State Senate
- Robert H. Kittleman (1926–2004), Maryland State Senate
