= 427th =

427th may refer to:

- 427th Aircraft Sustainment Group, inactive United States Air Force unit
- 427th Air Refueling Squadron, inactive United States Air Force unit
- 427th Bombardment Squadron, active United States Air Force unit
- 427th (Durham) Coast Regiment, Royal Artillery
- 427th (East Lancashire) Field Company, Royal Engineers
- 427th Maryland General Assembly, convened in a regular session on January 13, 2010
- 427th Reconnaissance Squadron, active United States Air Force unit
- 427th Special Operations Squadron (427th SOS), direct reporting unit of the Air Force Special Operations Command

== See also ==
- 427 (number)
- 427, the year 427 (CDXXVII) of the Julian calendar
- 427 BC
