= Anne Kaiser =

American politician (born 1968)

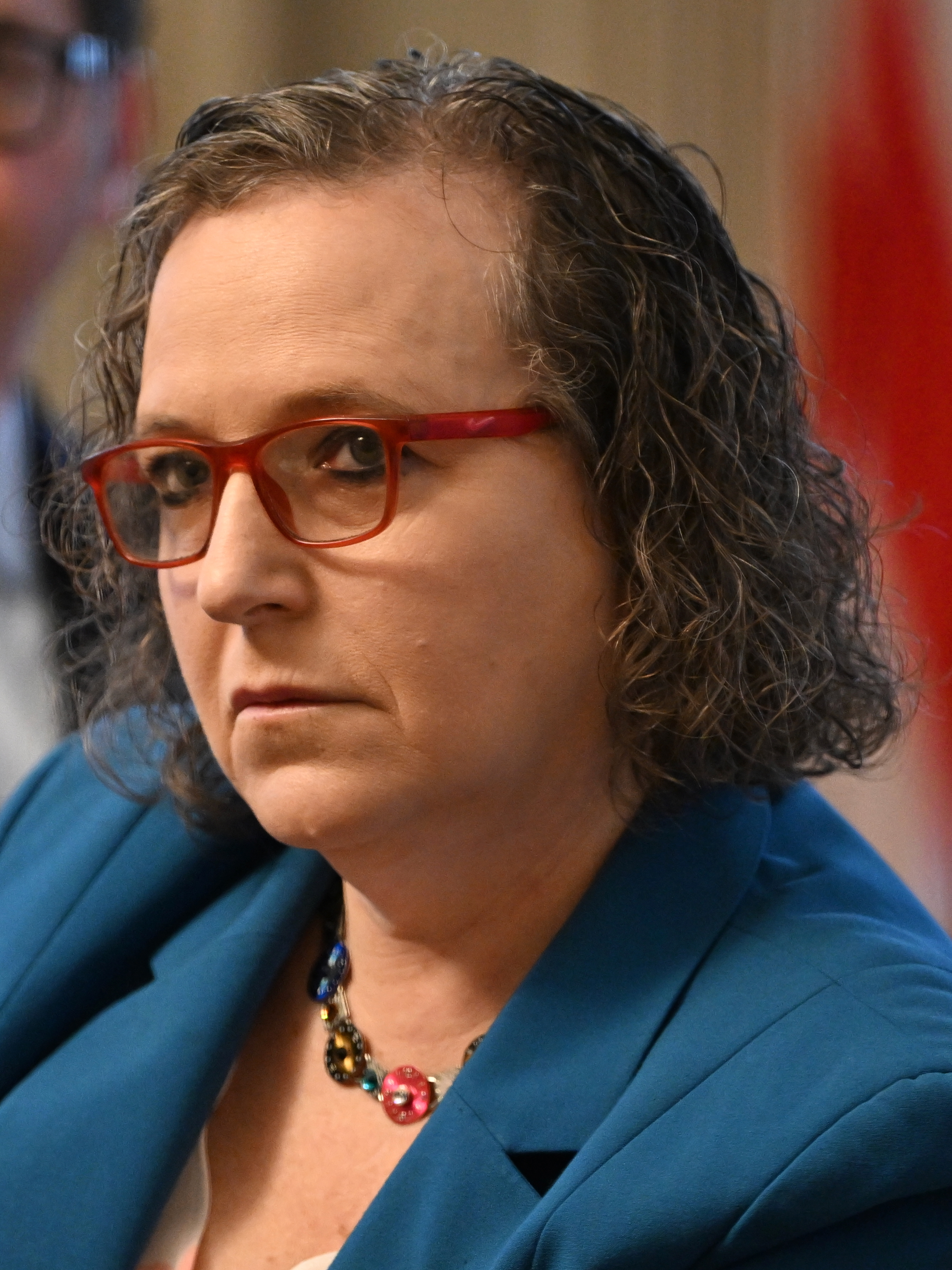
- Kaiser in 2025

Majority Leader of the Maryland House of Delegates
- In office January 14, 2015 – January 20, 2017
- Preceded by: Kumar P. Barve
- Succeeded by: William Frick

Member of the Maryland House of Delegates from the 14th district
- Incumbent
- Assumed office January 10, 2003 Serving with Bernice Mireku-North and Pamela E. Queen
- Preceded by: Tod Sher

Personal details
- Born: February 10, 1968 (age 58) Washington, D.C., U.S.
- Party: Democratic
- Spouse: Nancy Lineman
- Education: University of Chicago (BA); University of Michigan (MA, MPP)
- Website: Campaign website

Anne R. Kaiser (born February 10, 1968) is an American politician who has served as a member of the Maryland House of Delegates representing District 14 since 2003.

== Early life and education ==
Kaiser was born in Washington, D.C. on February 10, 1968, to father Jesse and mother Marian. She was raised in a Republican household, graduating from Rockville High School and later attending the University of Chicago, where she earned a Bachelor of Arts degree in political science in 1990, and the University of Michigan, where she earned a Master of Public Policy degree and a Master of Arts degree in educational studies in 1995.

== Career ==
After graduating from the University of Chicago, Kaiser worked as a staff assistant to U.S. Representative Neal Smith and Maryland state delegate Henry B. Heller, and as an intern for the Congressional Budget Office. While attending the University of Michigan, she worked as a teaching assistant for the university and as a policy analyst for the Maryland Department of Education. After graduating from the University of Michigan, Kaiser worked as a policy analyst for the United States Department of the Treasury until 2002. As of 2022, Kaiser works as a teacher at the University of Maryland School of Public Policy.

Kaiser first became involved in politics during her sophomore year in college, when she encouraged her parents to vote in local elections despite being opposite political parties. From 1997 to 1998, she was the president of the Montgomery County Political Action Committee and the District 19 Democratic Central Club. Afterwards, Kaiser was elected to serve as a member of the Montgomery County Democratic Central Committee until 2002.

=== Maryland House of Delegates ===
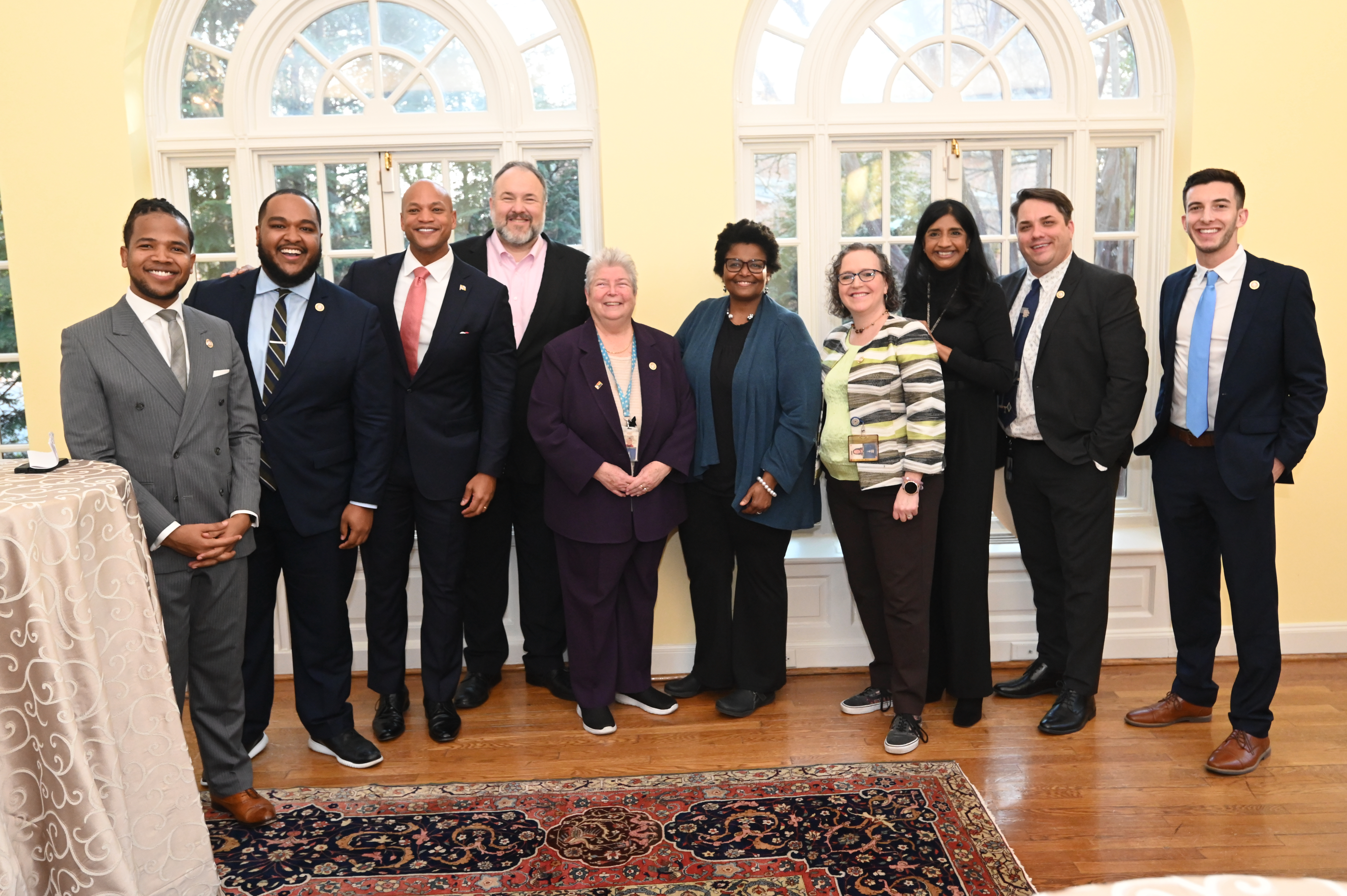
Kaiser (center right) and other members of the LGBTQ+ Caucus with Governor Wes Moore, 2023

Kaiser was sworn into the Maryland House of Delegates on January 8, 2003. She served as a member of the Ways and Means Committee from 2003 to 2021, and as its chair from 2017 to 2021, afterwards serving as a member of the Health and Government Operations Committee until 2025. In December 2025, House Speaker Joseline Peña-Melnyk named Healey as the vice chair of the Appropriations Committee.

From 2015 to 2017, Kaiser served as the majority leader of the Maryland House of Delegates.

Kaiser served as a delegate to the Democratic National Convention in 2004 and 2020.

== Political positions ==
=== Education ===
During the 2006 legislative session, Kaiser supported a bill that would weigh kids in schools.

In April 2011, Kaiser spoke in support of Maryland's Dream Act, a bill that extended in-state tuition for undocumented immigrants.

During the 2012 legislative session, Kaiser introduced a bill that would allow the Comptroller of Maryland to "garnish" a county's tax revenues to fully fund its school systems. The bill passed and was signed into law by Governor Martin O'Malley.

In December 2014, Kaiser said that she would not support proposals by Governor-elect Larry Hogan to remove school boards' ability to authorize charter schools, but expressed openness to removing regulations from private schools. In November 2019, she criticized Hogan's objections to the Blueprint for Maryland's Future education reforms. During the 2020 legislative session, Kaiser opposed legislation that would mandate a post-Labor Day start day for school districts.

=== Israel ===
In November 2023, Kaiser was one of 19 Jewish members of the Maryland General Assembly to sign onto a letter condemning a statement released by CASA de Maryland calling for an immediate ceasefire in the Gaza war.

=== Social issues ===
In February 2006, Kaiser voted against a bill that would amend the Maryland Constitution to ban same-sex marriage in the state. She supported the Civil Marriage Protection Act, which legalized same-sex marriage in Maryland, and bills to ban discrimination against transgender people. Kaiser has also criticized Florida's "Don't Say Gay" bill and opposed attempts to pass similar legislation in Maryland. During the 2023 legislative session, she introduced the Trans Health Equity Act, which would require the state's Medicaid program to cover gender-affirming treatment.

During the 2006 legislative session, Kaiser voted for a bill to provide $25 million a year toward stem cell research.

In 2012, Kaiser supported a bill that would allow the Montgomery County Council to ban panhandling.

During the 2015 legislative session, Kaiser introduced legislation that would create a ballot referendum on holding special elections when there is a vacancy in a county executive's seat.

=== Taxes ===
During the 2004 legislative session, Kaiser voted for a bill to raise over $1 billion in taxes by increasing the state sales tax and creating higher income tax brackets for wealthier Marylanders. In 2013, she supported legislation to index the state's gas tax to inflation to pay for transportation projects.

During the 2018 legislative session, Kaiser voted for a bill that would provide $5.6 billion in tax incentives to Amazon to build their second headquarters in Montgomery County.

In January 2019, Kaiser rejected calls from Governor Larry Hogan during his State of the State Address to pass more than $500 million in tax cuts, including in retirees' income and small business, calling them "pure fantasy".

In November 2019, Kaiser said that she supported the legalization and taxation of marijuana to fund the Blueprint for Maryland's Future education reforms.

=== Transportation ===
During the 2004 legislative session, Kaiser supported legislation to block construction of the Intercounty Connector. In December 2018, she criticized Governor Larry Hogan for not consulting with Montgomery County officials in creating a plan to expand Interstate 270 and the Capital Beltway, and said that she favored a proposal by Montgomery County Executive Marc Elrich on improving the American Legion Memorial Bridge.

== Personal life ==
Kaiser came out as lesbian in March 2004, while testifying for a bill that would allow domestic partners to make medical decisions for each other. She is married to her wife, Nancy Lineman, and together they have one child, born in May 2019.

Kaiser is Jewish and is a member of the Tikvat Israel Congregation.

== Electoral history ==
Maryland House of Delegates District 14 Democratic primary election, 2002
Party	Candidate	Votes	%
Democratic	Herman L. Taylor Jr. (incumbent)	5,352	16.6
Democratic	Karen S. Montgomery	4,678	14.5
Democratic	Anne Kaiser	4,280	13.3
Democratic	Craig Zucker	3,953	12.3
Democratic	Allan Mulligan	2,970	9.2
Democratic	Robert "Bo" Newsome	2,391	7.4
Democratic	Holly Reed	2,217	6.9
Democratic	A. Michael Kelley	2,151	6.7
Democratic	Michael B. Dupuy	1,420	4.4
Democratic	Mike Cafarelli	1,137	3.5
Democratic	Peter G. Esser	848	2.6
Democratic	Harold H. Huggins	794	2.5

Maryland House of Delegates District 14 election, 2002
Party	Candidate	Votes	%
Democratic	Herman L. Taylor Jr. (incumbent)	21,278	20.1
Democratic	Karen S. Montgomery	20,198	19.1
Democratic	Anne Kaiser	19,978	18.9
Republican	Patricia Cummings	15,260	14.4
Republican	Patricia Anne Faulkner	15,005	14.2
Republican	Jim Goldberg	14,162	13.4
Write-in		67	0.1

Maryland House of Delegates District 14 election, 2006
Party	Candidate	Votes	%
Democratic	Anne Kaiser (incumbent)	24,500	21.8
Democratic	Karen S. Montgomery (incumbent)	24,478	21.8
Democratic	Herman L. Taylor Jr. (incumbent)	24,273	21.6
Republican	John McKinnis	13,471	12.0
Republican	John R. Austin	12,963	11.5
Republican	Jim Goldberg	12,603	11.2
Write-in		61	0.1

Maryland House of Delegates District 14 election, 2010
Party	Candidate	Votes	%
Democratic	Anne Kaiser (incumbent)	23,503	21.5
Democratic	Craig Zucker	22,148	20.2
Democratic	Eric Luedtke	21,165	19.3
Republican	Patricia A. Fenati	14,866	13.6
Republican	Henry Kahwaty	14,152	12.9
Republican	Maria Peña-Faustino	13,639	12.4
Write-in		79	0.1

Maryland House of Delegates District 14 election, 2014
Party	Candidate	Votes	%
Democratic	Anne Kaiser (incumbent)	21,988	20.2
Democratic	Craig Zucker (incumbent)	20,917	19.3
Democratic	Eric Luedtke (incumbent)	20,012	18.4
Republican	Patricia Fenati	15,392	14.2
Republican	Sharon Trexler Begosh	15,096	13.9
Republican	Michael A. Ostroff	15,086	13.9
Write-in		114	0.1

Maryland House of Delegates District 14 Democratic primary election, 2018
Party	Candidate	Votes	%
Democratic	Anne Kaiser (incumbent)	11,845	33.3
Democratic	Pamela Queen (incumbent)	11,198	31.5
Democratic	Eric Luedtke (incumbent)	9,498	26.7
Democratic	Paul Ransom	3,064	8.6

Maryland House of Delegates District 14 election, 2018
Party	Candidate	Votes	%
Democratic	Anne Kaiser (incumbent)	37,733	24.5
Democratic	Pamela Queen (incumbent)	35,991	23.4
Democratic	Eric Luedtke (incumbent)	35,104	22.8
Republican	Patricia Fenati	15,895	10.3
Republican	Kevin Dorrance	14,546	9.5
Republican	Michael A. Ostroff	14,347	9.3
Write-in		144	0.1

Maryland House of Delegates District 14 Democratic primary election, 2022
Party	Candidate	Votes	%
Democratic	Anne Kaiser (incumbent)	12,843	29.0
Democratic	Pamela Queen (incumbent)	12,038	27.2
Democratic	Eric Luedtke (incumbent)	10,824	24.4
Democratic	Tom B. Smith	5,564	12.6
Democratic	Joshua Dowling	3,050	6.9

Maryland House of Delegates District 14 election, 2022
Party	Candidate	Votes	%
Democratic	Anne Kaiser (incumbent)	31,659	26.9
Democratic	Eric Luedtke (incumbent)	30,547	25.9
Democratic	Pamela Queen (incumbent)	30,304	25.7
Republican	Kathy Gugulis	12,614	10.7
Republican	Kate Walshe	12,282	10.4
Write-in		351	0.3

Maryland House of Delegates
Preceded by Kumar P. Barve	Majority Leader of the Maryland House of Delegates; 2015–2017	Succeeded by William Frick
