= Bernice Mireku-North =

American politician (born 1981)

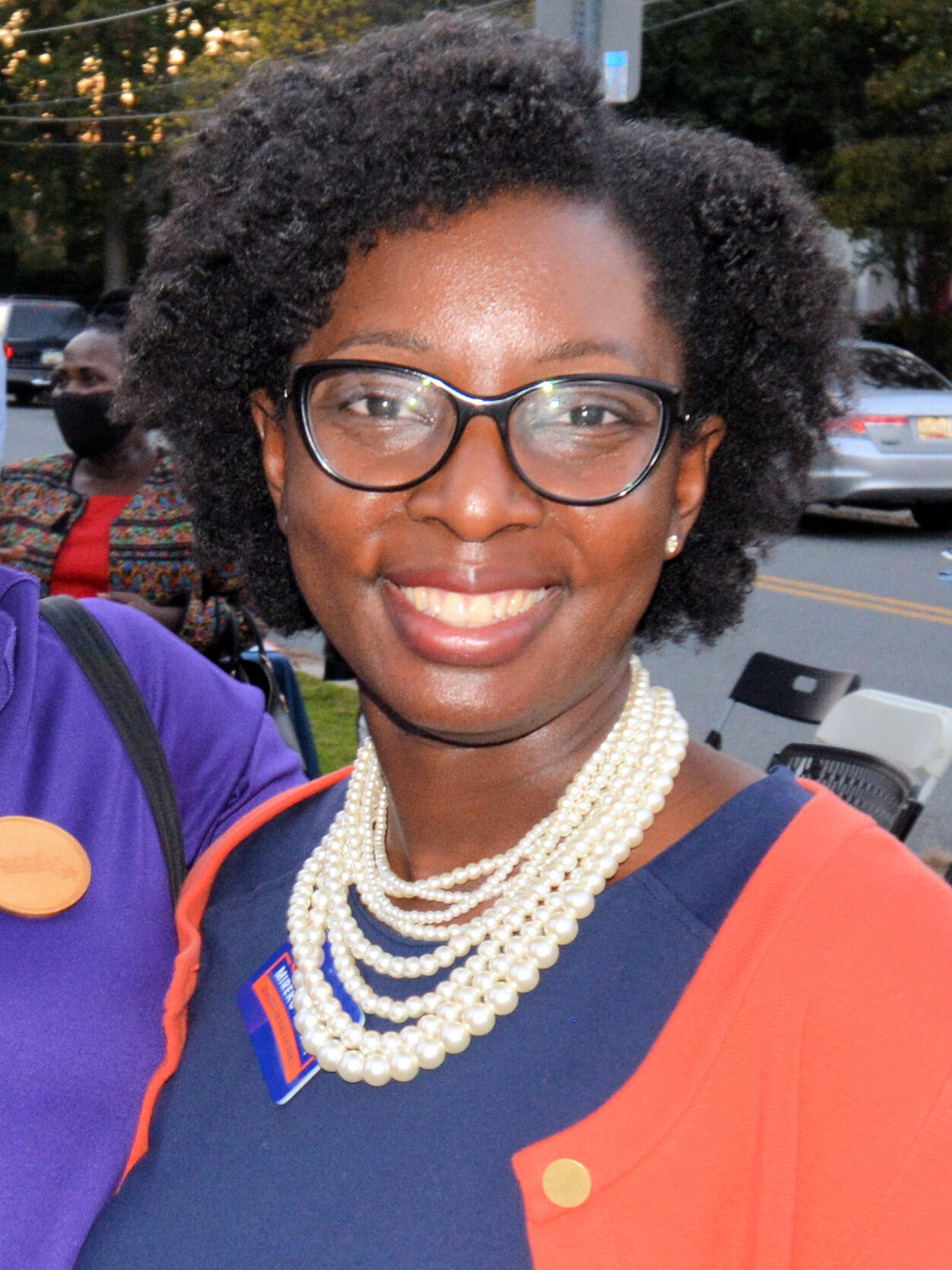

Member of the Maryland House of Delegates from the 14th district
- Incumbent
- Assumed office January 11, 2023 Serving with Anne Kaiser and Pamela E. Queen
- Appointed by: Larry Hogan
- Preceded by: Eric Luedtke

Personal details
- Born: October 29, 1981 (age 45)
- Party: Democratic
- Spouse: Terrill North
- Children: 1
- Education: University of Maryland, College Park (BA); Howard University School of Law (JD)
- Occupation: Criminal defense attorney
- Website: Campaign website

Bernice D. Mireku-North (born October 29, 1981) is an American politician. She is currently a Democratic member of the Maryland House of Delegates, appointed by Governor Larry Hogan to fill the term of Eric Luedtke, who resigned on January 2, 2023, to serve as the chief legislative officer of governor-elect Wes Moore. She was previously a candidate for Montgomery County State's Attorney in 2022.

== Early life and education ==
Mireku-North was born on October 29, 1981. Her parents were Ghanaian immigrants. She attended Montgomery County public schools and graduated from the University of Maryland, College Park with a B.A. degree in government and politics in 2003, and the Howard University School of Law with a J.D. degree in 2006. She also studied abroad at the University of Oxford in the summer of 2002, studying British and U.S. judicial systems. She also served as a judicial law clerk to D.C. Superior Court Associate Judge Hiram E. Puig-Lugo and Prince George's Circuit Court Judge Dwight D. Jackson.

== Career ==
Mireku-North served as the assistant state's attorney in Anne Arundel County from 2009 to 2015, then joined the Law Office of Aileen Oliver. Since 2019, she has run her own law firm, the North Law Group, and worked as a criminal defense attorney.

In 2020, Mireku-North was named co-chair of the Reimagining Public Safety Task Force organized by Montgomery County Executive Marc Elrich. The 41-member task force released its final report on February 5, 2021; its 87 recommendations included redirecting some 911 calls to non-law enforcement agencies, eliminating police training programs with connections to military training, and increasing recruitment at historically Black colleges and universities.

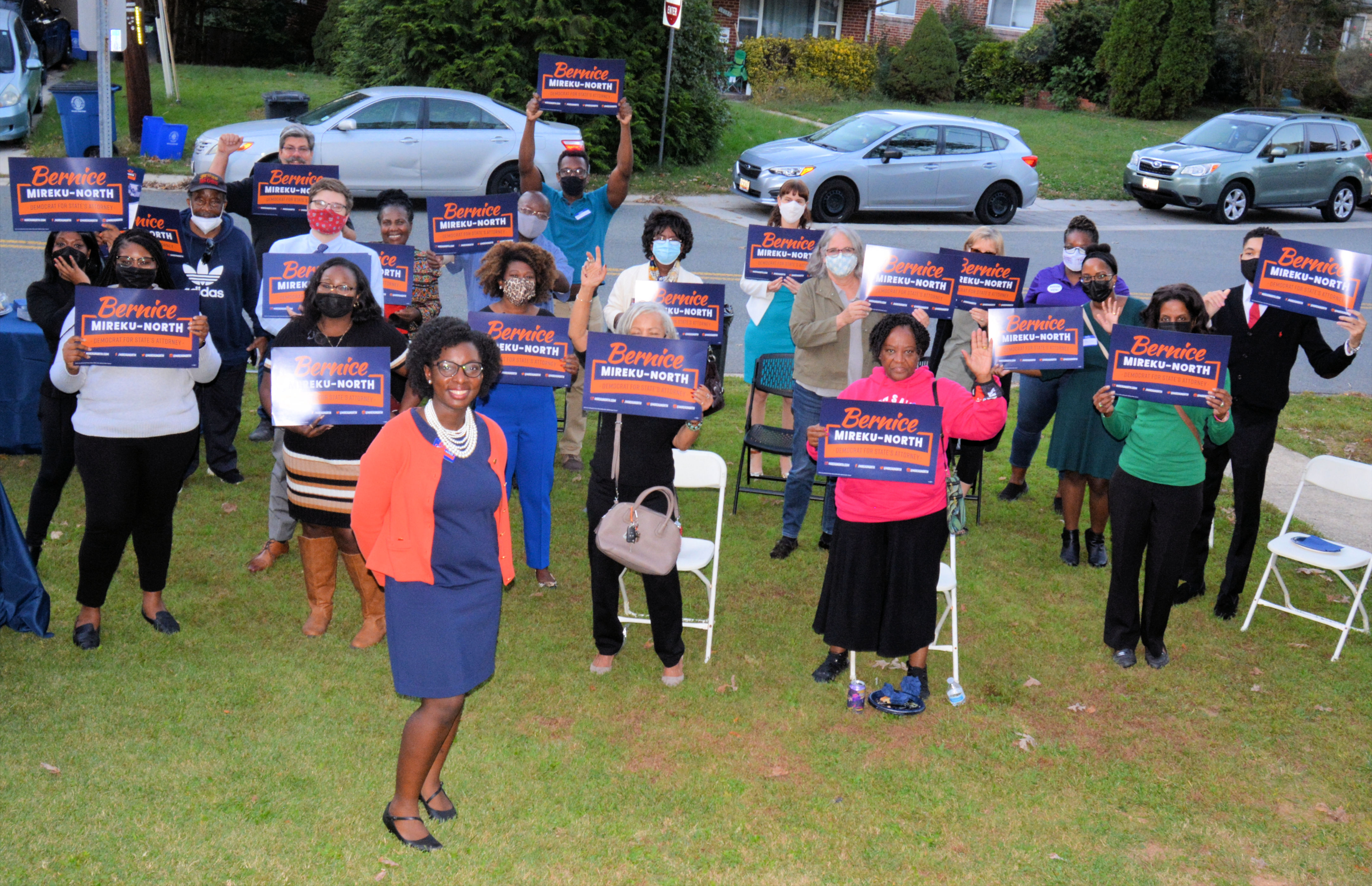
Mireku-North campaigning in October 2021

In June 2021, Mireku-North filed to run for Montgomery County State's Attorney, challenging incumbent John McCarthy. She pledged to reform criminal justice, increase diversity in the state's attorney's office, and divert minor offenders from jail. Mireku-North was defeated by McCarthy in the Democratic primary on July 19, 2022.

In October 2022, Mireku-North applied to fill a vacancy in the Montgomery County Planning Commission.

== In the legislature ==
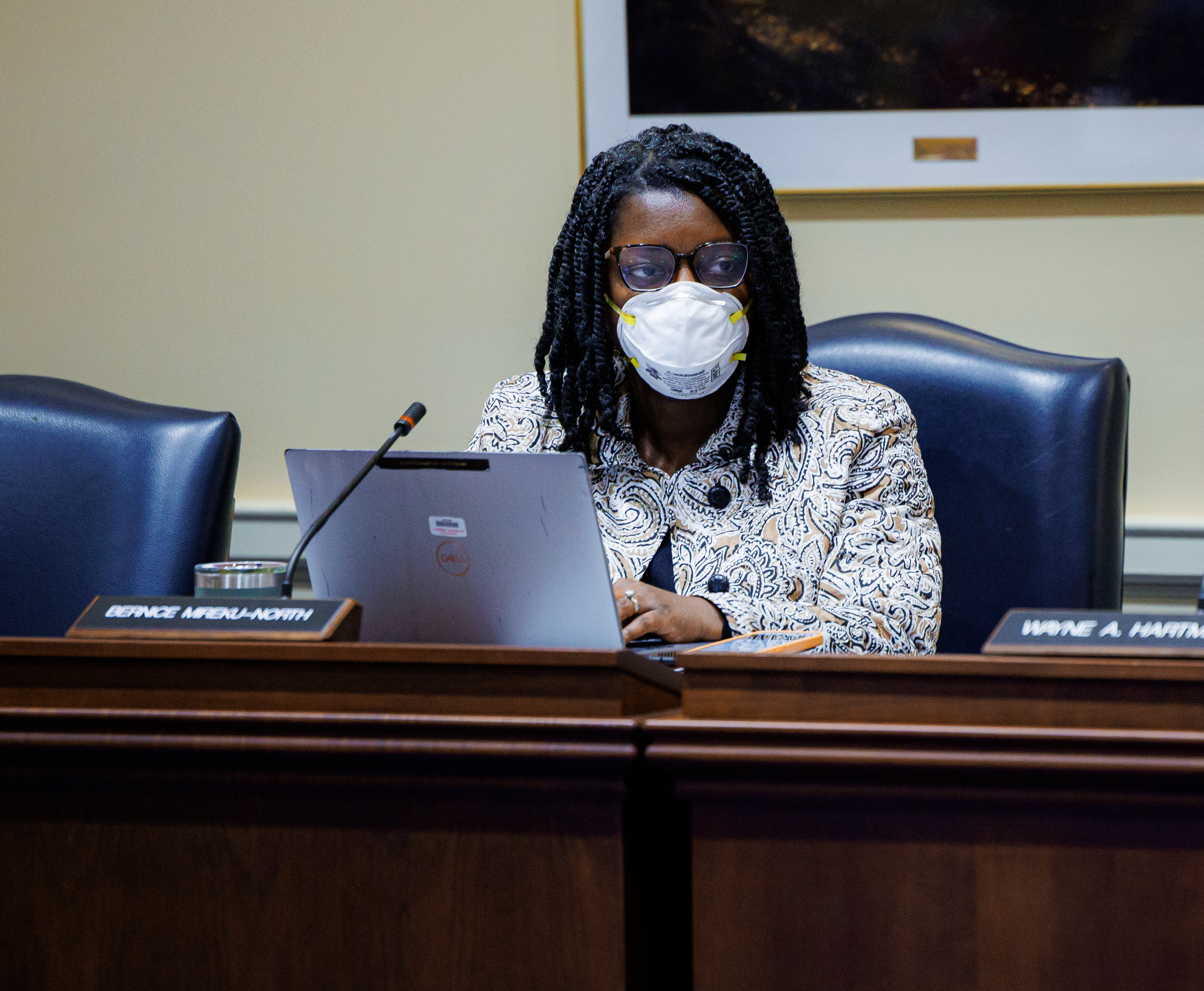
Mireku-North in the Ways and Means Committee, 2025

In December 2022, Mireku-North filed to fill the vacancy left by the resignation of then-Majority Leader of the Maryland House of Delegates Eric Luedtke, seeking to serve out his four-year term in the Maryland House of Delegates. On January 3, 2023, the Montgomery County Democratic Central Committee voted to nominate Mireku-North to fill the vacancy, and on January 6, Governor Larry Hogan appointed her to fill the seat.

Mireku-North has served as a member of the Ways and Means Committee since 2023, including as the chair of its child care subcommittee since 2026. She is also a member of the Legislative Black Caucus of Maryland, Women Legislators of Maryland, and the Maryland Legislative Latino Caucus.

== Political positions ==
During the 2026 legislative session, Mireku-North supported a bill to prohibit counties from entering into 287(g) program agreements with U.S. Immigration and Customs Enforcement (ICE), referring to ICE's enforcement tactics as "a weapon of white supremacy".

== Electoral history ==
Montgomery County State's Attorney Democratic primary election, 2022
Party	Candidate	Votes	%
Democratic	John McCarthy (incumbent)	65,598	52.05
Democratic	Bernice Mireku-North	23,972	19.02
Democratic	Perry Paylor	18,648	14.80
Democratic	Tom DeGonia	17,817	14.14
