= Craig Zucker =

American politician (born 1975)

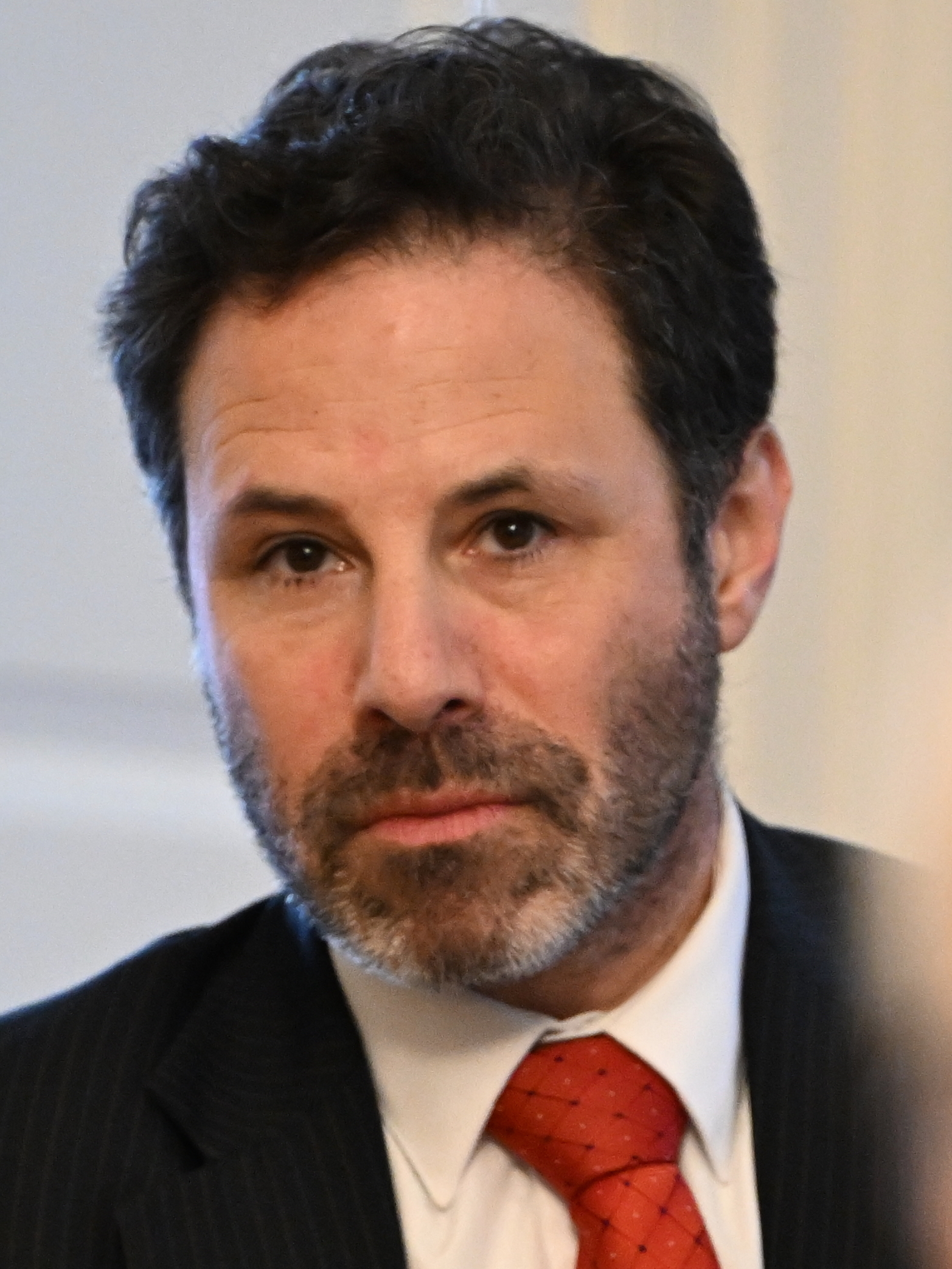

Member of the Maryland Senate from the 14th district
- Incumbent
- Assumed office February 4, 2016
- Preceded by: Karen S. Montgomery

Member of the Maryland House of Delegates from the 14th district
- In office January 12, 2011 – February 4, 2016
- Preceded by: Herman L. Taylor Jr.; Karen S. Montgomery
- Succeeded by: Pamela E. Queen

Personal details
- Born: Craig Jason Zucker; March 23, 1975 (age 51) Englewood, New Jersey, U.S.
- Party: Democratic
- Spouse: Jenny
- Children: 2
- Education: St. Thomas Aquinas College (BS); Johns Hopkins University (MA)
- Website: Campaign website

Craig Jason Zucker (born March 23, 1975) is an American politician who has represented District 14 in the Maryland Senate since 2016. A member of the Democratic Party, he previously represented the district in the Maryland House of Delegates from 2011 to 2016.

== Early life and education ==
Zucker was born in Englewood, New Jersey, and raised in nearby Teaneck. He earned his Bachelor of Science from St. Thomas Aquinas College in 1997, and his masters degree in government from Johns Hopkins University in 2004.

== Political career ==
Zucker first got involved in politics as a college intern for U.S. Senators Bill Bradley and Carl Levin, and later worked as a scheduler for Senator Barbara Boxer. He worked as a legislative director to Maryland state delegate Peter Franchot from 1999 to 2000, afterwards working as a deputy district director for U.S. Representative Albert Wynn until 2004. Zucker served as the vice-chair of the Mid-County Recreation Advisory Board in Montgomery County, Maryland from 2004 to 2006, and as the deputy chief of staff to Comptroller Peter Franchot until 2010.

In 2002, Zucker unsuccessfully ran for the Maryland House of Delegates in District 14, placing fourth with 12.3 percent of the vote in the Democratic primary election.

In August 2024, Zucker became a senior vice president of strategic development and government relations at Service Coordination Inc.

=== Maryland General Assembly ===
Zucker was sworn into the Maryland House of Delegates on January 12, 2011, and was a member of the Appropriations Committee during his entire tenure. From 2015 to 2016, he served as the House chair of the Joint Audit Committee.

In December 2015, following the resignation of state senator Karen S. Montgomery, Zucker applied to serve the remainder of her term in the Maryland Senate. His candidacy was backed by Senate president Thomas V. Miller Jr. In January 2016, the Montgomery County Democratic Central Committee voted to nominate Zucker to fill the seat, and Governor Larry Hogan appointed him to the seat at the end of the week. Zucker was sworn in on February 4, 2016.

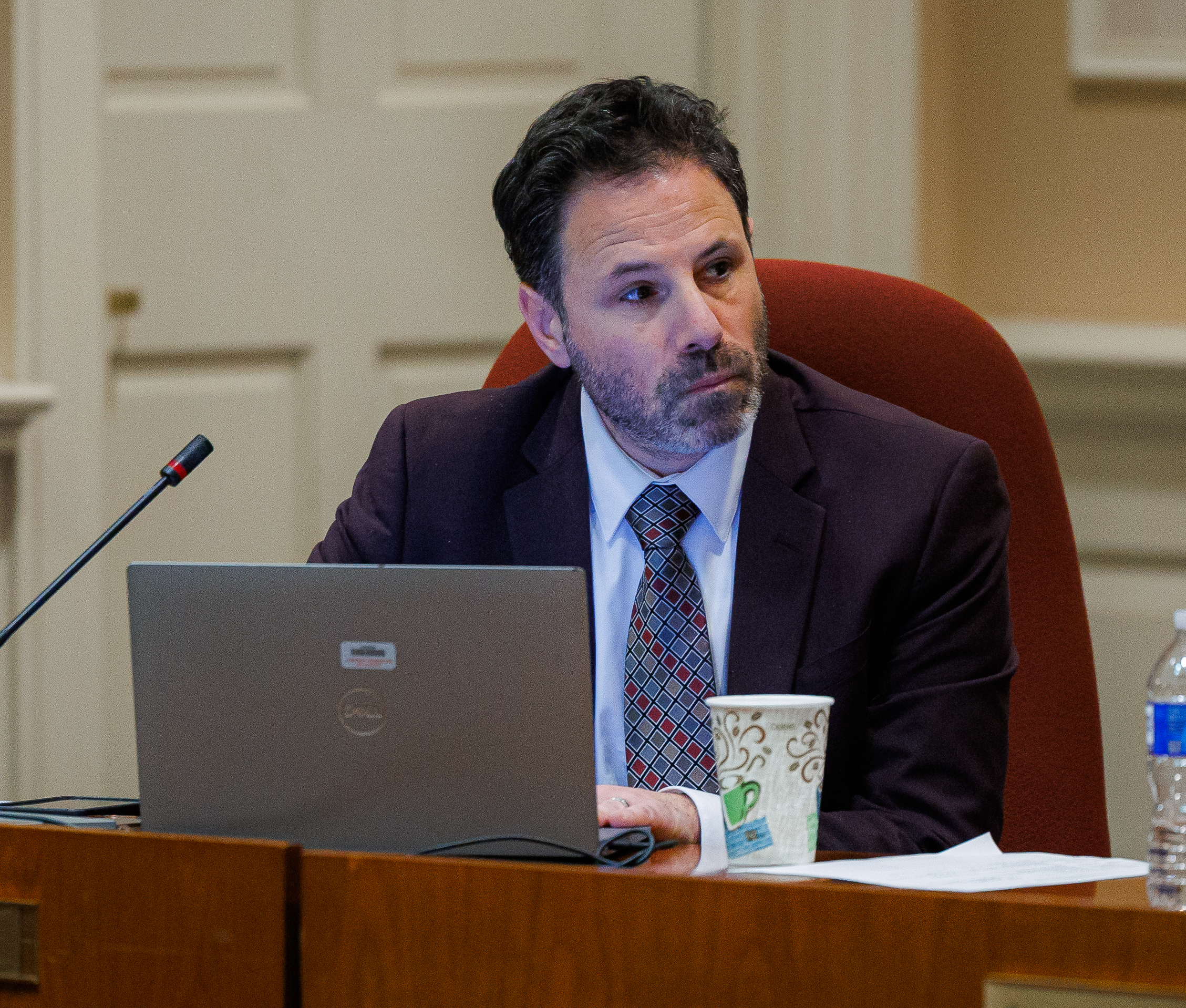
Zucker in the Senate Budget and Taxation Committee, 2025

Zucker was a member of the Education, Health, and Environmental Affairs Committee until 2018, afterwards serving in the Budget and Taxation Committee. In December 2019, following the election of Bill Ferguson as President of the Maryland Senate, Zucker was named as the chair of the Senate Democratic Caucus. In August 2021, Ferguson appointed Zucker as the chair of the Capital Budget Subcommittee following the resignation of Douglas J. J. Peters.

Since 2016, Zucker serves as the Senate member on the Maryland Commission on Disabilities.

== Political positions ==
=== Education ===
In 2018, Zucker introduced a bill that would require the state to teach sexual consent. The bill passed and became law.

During the 2019 legislative session, Zucker introduced legislation that would add seats for a parent and teachers to the Maryland State Board of Education, and the Ready to Read Act, which requires school systems to provide additional support to kindergarten and first grade students with reading challenges. Both bills passed and became law.

In 2022, Zucker introduced a bill that would prohibit public schools from secluding other students except under certain conditions.

=== Electoral reform ===
In 2016, Zucker voted to override Governor Larry Hogan's veto on a bill that would restore voting rights to released felons.

During the 2017 legislative session, Zucker introduced a bill that would require Maryland to use an independent redistricting commission to draw its congressional and legislative districts if New York, New Jersey, Virginia, North Carolina, and Pennsylvania all passed legislation to do the same. The bill passed, but was vetoed by Governor Hogan.

In 2018, Zucker introduced a bill that would require social media websites to record data on political advertisements and users targeted by them, which passed and became law without Governor Hogan's signature.

=== Gambling ===
During the 2020 legislative session, Zucker introduced a bill to authorize the state to issue sports betting licenses to fund the state's sports wagering industry and public schools. The bill passed and became law. After voters approved a statewide referendum to legalize sports betting in the 2020 general election, Zucker led a workgroup to develop a bill regulating the state's sports wagering industry, which passed and was signed into law by Governor Larry Hogan.

=== Housing ===
During the 2022 legislative session, Zucker introduced a bill that would require the Comptroller of Maryland to redirect $14 million from abandoned property funds to a fund providing the right to counsel in eviction cases. The bill passed and became law.

=== Israel ===
In November 2023, Zucker and all of the Montgomery County State Senators signed a joint letter that threatened to withhold state money to CASA de Maryland because a member o f their staff, at a rally, held up a sign calling for the elimination of Jews from the West Bank. Since then, Zucker has been endorsed by CASA de Maryland and helped secure more than $3 million for their Welcome Centers for security enhancements to combat the overreach of the Trump Administration.

=== National politics ===
Zucker (left) and U.S. senator Angela Alsobrooks at the U.S. Capitol, 2026

In December 2019, Zucker participated in and spoke at a rally in Olney, Maryland, to support of the first impeachment of Donald Trump.

=== Social issues ===
In March 2011, Zucker said he supported the Civil Marriage Protection Act, which legalized same-sex marriage in Maryland.

In 2013, Zucker voted for a bill to repeal the death penalty in Maryland.

During the 2018 legislative session and amid the MeToo movement, Zucker introduced legislation that would ban employers from imposing non-disclosure agreements on workers reporting sexual harassment and require employers with more than 50 workers to disclose information about their records in maintaining harassment-free workplaces. The bill passed and was signed into law by Governor Larry Hogan.

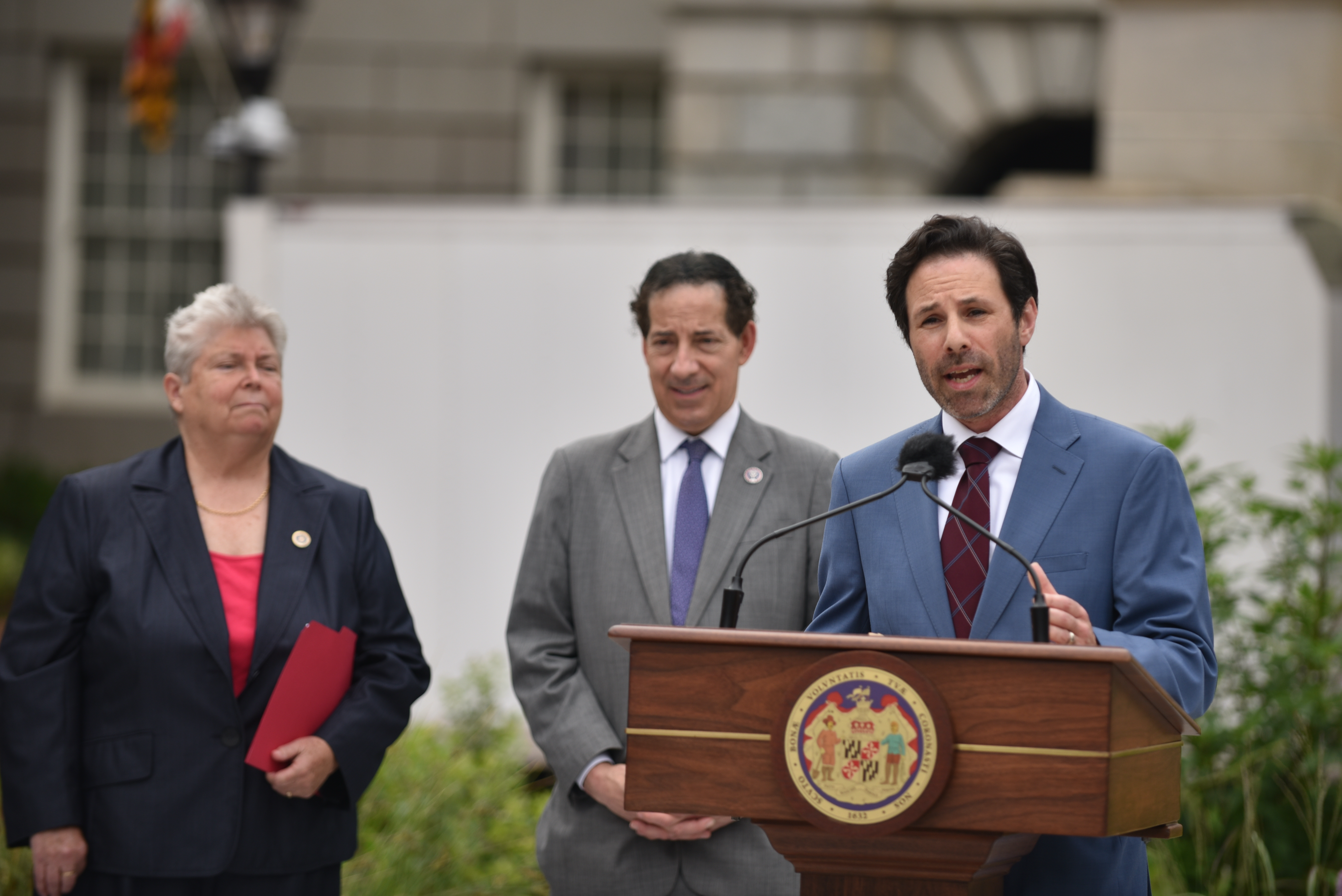
Zucker and Jamie Raskin at the signing of the Tommy Bloom Raskin Act

During the 2021 legislative session and following the suicide of Jamie Raskin's son, Tommy, Cullison introduced a bill named for Tommy that would allow people to opt into periodic calls from 2-1-1 crisis counselors. The bill passed and was signed into law by Governor Hogan.

During the 2026 legislative session, Zucker introduced a bill to codify federal protections drawn from the U.S. Supreme Court's 1999 decision in Olmstead v. L.C., which made it illegal to discriminate against people with disabilities in community settings.

=== Taxes ===
During the 2012 legislative session, Zucker introduced legislation that would provide income tax breaks on up to $2 million of forgiven mortgage debt. The bill passed and was signed into law by Governor Martin O'Malley.

In 2013, Zucker voted for a bill to index the state's fuel taxes to inflation to pay for transportation projects.

=== Transportation ===
During the 2020 legislative session, Zucker introduced a bill that would require the state to provide at least $500 million toward Maryland Transit Administration projects annually for five years. The bill died in committee.

In 2021, Zucker introduced legislation that would prohibit the Maryland Transit Administration from purchasing buses that are not zero-emission.

== Personal life ==
Zucker is married to his wife, Jenny. Together, they have two children and live in Brookeville, Maryland. His son is autistic. Zucker is Jewish.

== Electoral history ==
Maryland House of Delegates District 14 Democratic primary election, 2002
Party	Candidate	Votes	%
Democratic	Herman L. Taylor Jr. (incumbent)	5,352	16.6
Democratic	Karen S. Montgomery	4,678	14.5
Democratic	Anne Kaiser	4,280	13.3
Democratic	Craig Zucker	3,953	12.3
Democratic	Allan Mulligan	2,970	9.2
Democratic	Robert "Bo" Newsome	2,391	7.4
Democratic	Holly Reed	2,217	6.9
Democratic	A. Michael Kelley	2,151	6.7
Democratic	Michael B. Dupuy	1,420	4.4
Democratic	Mike Cafarelli	1,137	3.5
Democratic	Peter G. Esser	848	2.6
Democratic	Harold H. Huggins	794	2.5

Maryland House of Delegates District 14 Democratic primary election, 2010
Party	Candidate	Votes	%
Democratic	Anne Kaiser (incumbent)	6,380	24.1
Democratic	Craig Zucker	6,216	23.5
Democratic	Eric Luedtke	3,696	14.0
Democratic	Jodi Finkelstein	3,154	11.9
Democratic	Robert Bo Newsome	2,834	10.7
Democratic	Gerald Roper	1,660	6.3
Democratic	Neeta Datt	1,288	4.9
Democratic	Vanessa Ali	1,244	4.7

Maryland House of Delegates District 14 election, 2010
Party	Candidate	Votes	%
Democratic	Anne Kaiser (incumbent)	23,503	21.5
Democratic	Craig Zucker	22,148	20.2
Democratic	Eric Luedtke	21,165	19.3
Republican	Patricia A. Fenati	14,866	13.6
Republican	Henry Kahwaty	14,152	12.9
Republican	Maria Peña-Faustino	13,639	12.4
Write-in		79	0.1

Maryland House of Delegates District 14 election, 2014
Party	Candidate	Votes	%
Democratic	Anne Kaiser (incumbent)	21,988	20.2
Democratic	Craig Zucker (incumbent)	20,917	19.3
Democratic	Eric Luedtke (incumbent)	20,012	18.4
Republican	Patricia Fenati	15,392	14.2
Republican	Sharon Trexler Begosh	15,096	13.9
Republican	Michael A. Ostroff	15,086	13.9
Write-in		114	0.1

Maryland Senate District 14 Democratic primary election, 2018
Party	Candidate	Votes	%
Democratic	Craig Zucker (incumbent)	13,261	100.0

Maryland Senate District 14 election, 2018
Party	Candidate	Votes	%
Democratic	Craig Zucker (incumbent)	40,262	72.6
Republican	Robert Drozd	15,177	27.4
Write-in		52	0.1

Maryland Senate District 14 election, 2022
Party	Candidate	Votes	%
Democratic	Craig Zucker (incumbent)	40,262	73.3
Republican	Alex Bieber	12,099	26.6
Write-in		55	0.1
