= Pamela E. Queen =

American politician (born 1960)

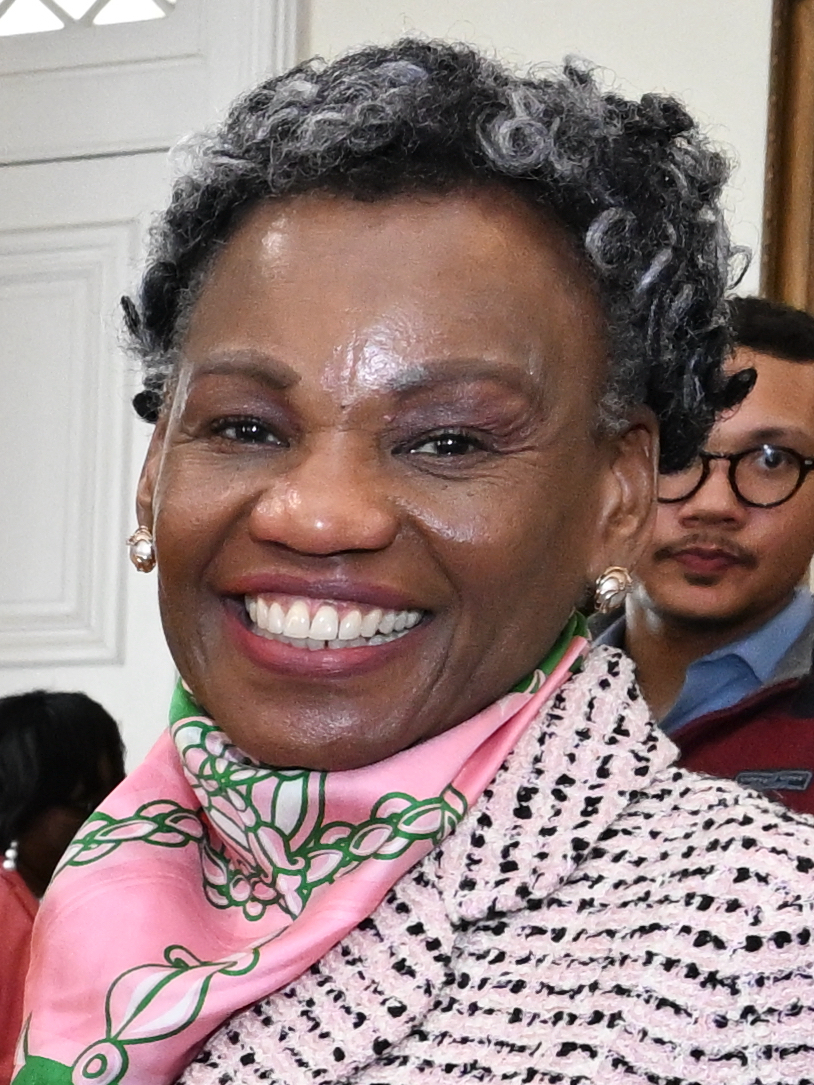
- Queen in 2025

Member of the Maryland House of Delegates from the 14th district
- Incumbent
- Assumed office February 26, 2016 Serving with Anne Kaiser and Bernice Mireku-North
- Appointed by: Larry Hogan
- Preceded by: Craig Zucker

Personal details
- Born: 1960 (age 65–66) New York City, New York, U.S.
- Party: Democratic
- Relatives: Madison Scott (granddaughter)
- Occupation: Professor

Pamela E. Queen (born 1960) is an American politician who has served as a member of the Maryland House of Delegates since 2016, representing the 14th district in northern Montgomery County. She is a member of the Democratic Party.

== Personal life ==
Queen was born in New York City in 1960 and attended Tuskegee University, where she earned a B.S. in mathematics. She later went on to earn two master's degrees from Johns Hopkins University in computer science and management and a Ph.D. in finance from the George Washington University. Since 2010, she has worked as a professor of finance at Morgan State University in Baltimore, Maryland. Queen has been involved in a number of community and professional organizations.

== In the legislature ==
In 2016, following the appointment of Delegate Craig Zucker to the Maryland Senate, Queen, a member of the Montgomery County Democratic Central Committee, was appointed by that committee to serve in the House of Delegates. She is the second African American woman to represent Montgomery County in the Maryland General Assembly. She was sworn in on February 26, 2016. Queen was elected to a full four-year term in 2018, becoming one of the first Black women from Montgomery County to win election to the House of Delegates, alongside Jheanelle Wilkins and Charlotte Crutchfield.

Queen was a member of the Judiciary Committee from 2016 to 2018, afterwards serving in the Economic Matters Committee, including as the chair of its banking, consumer protection, and commercial law subcommittee since 2020. She is also a member of the Montgomery County Delegation, the Legislative Black Caucus of Maryland, the Women Legislators of Maryland, and the Maryland Legislative Latino Caucus.

In September 2025, Queen announced that she would not run for re-election in 2026.

== Political positions ==
=== Abortion ===
In January 2019, Queen was one of nine Maryland lawmakers to add their names to a manifesto signed by 326 state legislators to reaffirm their commitment to protecting abortion rights.

=== Education ===
Queen introduced legislation in the 2019 legislative session that would begin teaching students about organ donation at the age of 14.

=== Energy ===
During the 2026 legislative session, Queen introduced a bill that would allow the Maryland Public Service Commission to allow or require energy companies to own, lease, or operate an energy-generating facility.

=== National politics ===
In September 2018, Queen called for a county investigation into sexual assault allegations made against Supreme Court nominee Brett Kavanaugh. Montgomery County law enforcement officials declined to investigate the matter unless the alleged victim filed a complaint.

In December 2019, Queen attended a rally in Olney, Maryland to call for the impeachment and removal of Donald Trump.

=== Redistricting ===
In 2019, Queen co-sponsored legislation that would place a referendum to add an amendment to the Constitution of Maryland prohibiting partisan redistricting on the 2020 ballot. In December 2025, she expressed concerns with mid-decade redistricting in Maryland, warning that Democrats could risk losing a congressional seat due to the unpredictability of unaffiliated voters.

=== Social issues ===
Queen introduced legislation in the 2019 legislative session that would provide additional Supplemental Nutrition Assistance Program benefits to low-income children during summer months and winter break. The bill passed and became law on May 28, 2019.

Queen introduced legislation in the 2021 legislative session that would remove the governor from the state's parole board. The bill passed the House of Delegates by a vote of 93-41.

== Personal life ==
Queen's granddaughter is Madison Scott, a professional college basketball player. In March 2025, Queen traveled to Waco, Texas, to cheer on Scott during the Ole Miss–Baylor women's basketball game.

== Electoral history ==
Maryland House of Delegates District 14 Democratic Primary Election, 2018
Party	Candidate	Votes	%
Democratic	Anne Kaiser	11,845	33.3%
Democratic	Pamela Queen	11,198	31.5%
Democratic	Eric Luedtke	9,498	26.7%
Democratic	Paul Ransom	3,064	8.6%

Maryland House of Delegates District 14 General Election, 2018
Party	Candidate	Votes	%
Democratic	Anne Kaiser	37,733	24.5%
Democratic	Pamela Queen	35,991	23.4%
Democratic	Eric Luedtke	35,104	22.8%
Republican	Patricia Fenati	15,895	10.3%
Republican	Kevin Dorrance	14,546	9.5%
Republican	Michael A. Ostroff	14,347	9.3%
N/A	Other Write-Ins	144	0.1%
