= The Arc Montgomery County =

U.S. nonprofit organization

The Arc Montgomery County is a nonprofit organizations in the U.S. state of Maryland that serves individuals, families and employers affected by intellectual and developmental disabilities. Since 1958, The Arc has been the leading provider of lifelong educational, residential, vocational, and support programs and resources in Montgomery County.

A day program for adults, the precursor of today's employment-oriented Vocational Services Division, opened in 1960. In the 1970s, the organization put more emphasis on helping entire families, establishing a family support program and opening its first residential group home. The agency now operates more than 50 residential sites.

The organization underwent several name changes over the years, as its mission expanded to include adults and the national organization voted for terminology changes. In 1992, the agency became "The Arc" deleting the word "retarded" from its name as the result of self-advocates' efforts.

The last two decades have been a time of expansion, especially in the area of children's programs. In 1991, The Arc launched the Family and Infant Child Care Center, a nursing and child care program for infants with severe medical conditions. In 1992, the Karasik Child Care Center opened its doors to include children with and without special needs. In 1998, a partnership with the Boys and Girls Clubs of Greater Washington led to the opening of After All, an inclusive after-school program for youth and adolescents.

In 2001, the agency began providing Community Supported Living Arrangement (CSLA) services. These efforts allow for individuals to live independently and receive direct support in their own homes.

The Arc continues to look for new ways to create a more inclusive community and to broaden its comprehensive services. In 2007, The Arc opened The Arc Recycling Solutions and in 2009 opened its first thrift store.

Each year The Arc serves more than 2,500 individuals with a broad range of comprehensive services.
