= Eric Luedtke =

American politician

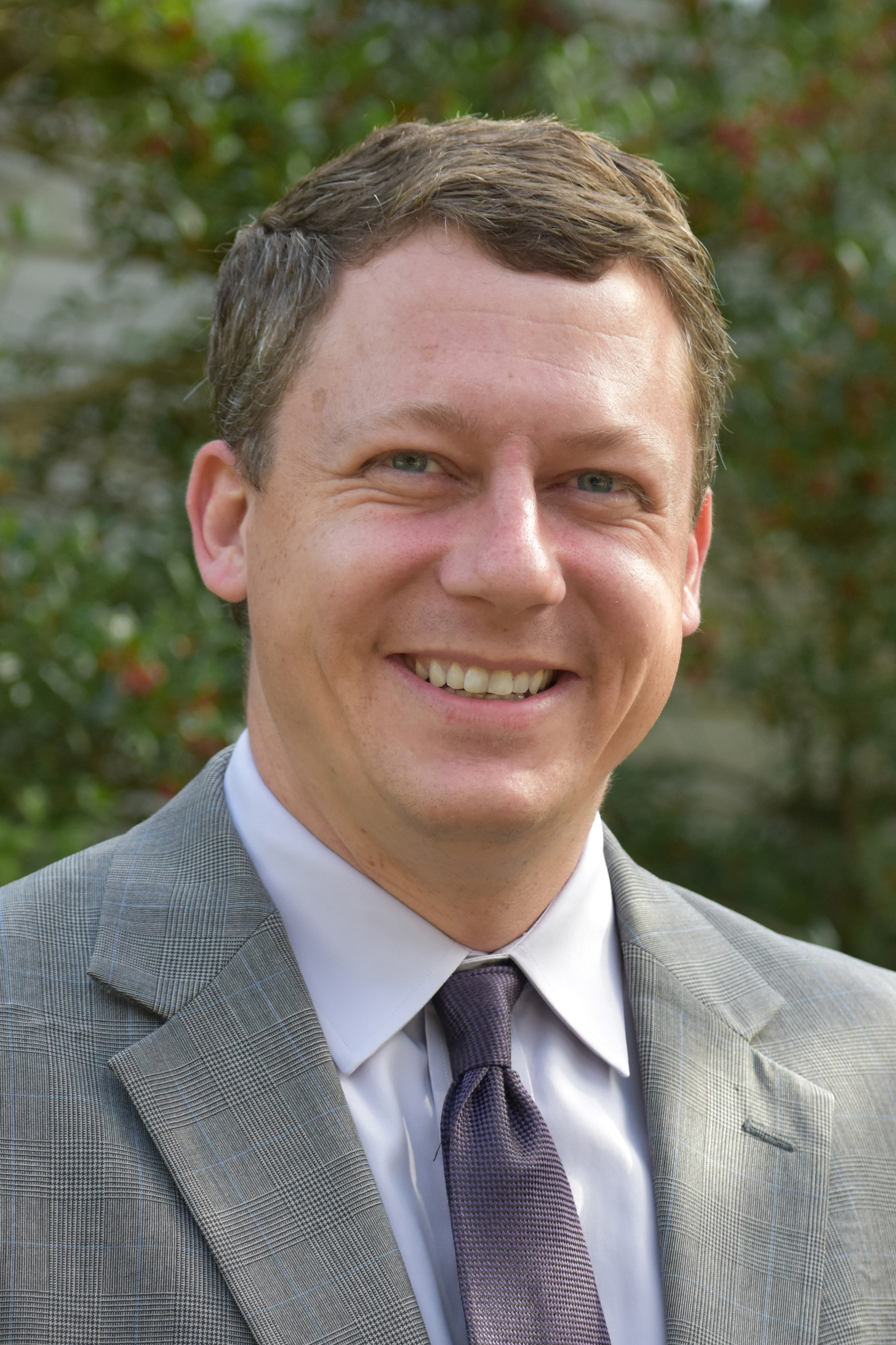

Majority Leader of the Maryland House of Delegates
- In office September 9, 2019 – January 2, 2023
- Preceded by: Kathleen Dumais
- Succeeded by: Marc Korman

Member of the Maryland House of Delegates from the 14th district
- In office January 13, 2011 – January 2, 2023 Serving with Anne Kaiser, Pamela E. Queen
- Preceded by: Herman L. Taylor Jr.
- Succeeded by: Bernice Mireku-North

Personal details
- Born: November 13, 1981 (age 44) Washington, D.C., U.S.
- Party: Democratic
- Spouse: Dawn Luedtke
- Children: 4
- Education: University of Maryland, College Park (BA, MEd)

Eric Luedtke (born November 13, 1981) is an American politician and educator from Maryland. A member of the Democratic Party, he served as chief legislative officer for Governor Wes Moore from 2023 to 2024. He previously served in the Maryland House of Delegates, representing District 14 in Montgomery County and serving as a member of the Ways and Means Committee and as Chair of the Revenues Subcommittee, from 2011 to 2023. He also served as the House Majority Leader from 2019 and 2023.

== Personal life ==
Luedtke was born in Washington, D.C., and grew up in Montgomery County, Maryland, attending Thomas S. Wootton High School in Rockville, Maryland and later the University of Maryland, College Park. He worked as a middle school social studies teacher for Montgomery County Public Schools from 2004 to 2015. After becoming a teacher, he became involved with the Montgomery County Education Association, where he served on the board of directors. He also served on Montgomery County's East County Citizens Advisory Board, advocated on environmental issues with the local Sierra Club, and served as a member of the board of trustees of the Sandy Spring Museum. Following his election, he continued to work as a classroom teacher for a number of years prior to returning to his alma mater, the University of Maryland, first as an adjunct instructor and then as a clinical professor.

== Political career ==
In the fall of 2009, Luedtke explored a run against incumbent State Senator Rona E. Kramer. He dropped out of the Senate race, but in early 2010 two seats in the House of Delegates became open when incumbent Delegate Karen S. Montgomery decided to challenge Kramer and Delegate Herman L. Taylor, Jr. began a campaign against Congresswoman Donna Edwards. Luedtke entered the campaign for one of the district's three seats in the House of Delegates, competing against seven other Democrats in the primary. In the primary election on September 14, 2010, Luedtke finished in third place, behind incumbent Delegate Anne Kaiser and political staffer Craig Zucker. Democrats swept the general election in the district, winning the three Delegate seats as well as the Senate seat. Luedtke was sworn into the House of Delegates on January 12, 2011.

During his first term in the House of Delegates, Luedtke was assigned to the House Ways and Means Committee, which oversees tax policy, education, election law, and gambling. He participated in debates on a number of major issues in his first year. During the floor debate on the Civil Marriage Protection Act, which would have legalized same-sex marriage in Maryland, Luedtke helped defeat hostile amendments. He also played a role in passage of the Maryland Dream Act, giving undocumented immigrants the right to in state tuition at Maryland Universities. In that debate, he was quoted by the Baltimore Sun as arguing that, "We are talking about children. They didn't make the decision to cross the border," and therefore should not be punished for decisions their parents made. He was among the leaders of the effort led by backbenchers in 2014 that resulted in the partial decriminalization of marijuana possession in the state.

In January 2013, Luedtke was appointed to chair the Financial Resources Subcommittee, which oversees the lottery, casino gambling, and horse racing. He was also appointed as co-chair of the Joint Committee on Gaming Oversight. He continued to serve as chair of that subcommittee until 2017, when he was appointed to chair the Education Subcommittee, which oversees education policy in the state from pre-kindergarten through 12th grade. As Chair of the Education Subcommittee, Luedtke authored a range of legislation related to education policy. In 2017, he led successful efforts to place limits on standardized testing in schools through the Less Testing, More Learning Act. That year, he also authored and led the effort to pass and override a veto on the Protect Our Schools Act, which aimed to force the state to assess the quality of schools using a range of criteria rather than simply test scores, and banned the state from attempting to privatize public schools. In 2019, he coordinated efforts by legislators to apply pressure to the State Department of Education to update their history curriculum to ensure that students are taught about the history of the LGBT and disability rights movements.

In January 2019, Luedtke was selected to chair the Democratic Caucus in the House of Delegates. Later that spring, following the unexpected passing of long time Speaker Michael E. Busch, he presided over a contentious caucus meeting convened to choose a new Speaker. That meeting resulted in the selection of a compromise candidate, Adrienne A. Jones, who became the first woman and the first black legislator to serve in the role of Speaker in Maryland. Later that year, Speaker Jones then elevated Luedtke to serve as House Majority Leader.

Luedtke has advocated in the legislature on a broad range of issues, most notably education, the environment, and for the rights of people with disabilities. During the 2012 legislative session, he argued during floor debate for passage of a bill increasing Maryland's minimum legal age for dropping out of school. He was the lead sponsor in the House of Delegates of Maryland's successful ban on possession and sale of shark fin, part of an international effort to protect shark populations. In 2019, during debate on legislation to legalize physician-assisted suicide in Maryland, Luedtke gave a key floor speech in support of the bill. The bill later passed the House of Delegates but failed in the Senate.

On November 14, 2022, Governor-elect Wes Moore announced that Luedtke would serve as his chief legislative officer. He resigned from the Maryland House of Delegates on January 2, 2023. Former state's attorney candidate Bernice Mireku-North was appointed by outgoing governor Larry Hogan to succeed Luedtke effective January 11, 2023. In December 2024, ahead of the 2025 legislative session, Luedtke stepped down as Moore's chief legislative officer, but remained in the Moore administration as a senior advisor. He was succeeded by Jeremy Baker, who was previously the chief of staff to House Speaker Adrienne A. Jones.

Luedtke was a delegate to the 2024 Democratic National Convention, pledged to Kamala Harris.

== Election results ==
=== 2010 Democratic Primary ===
In 2010, Luedtke ran for the House of Delegates after then-Delegates Herman L. Taylor, Jr. and Karen S. Montgomery decided to run for higher offices. Luedtke was successful in the Democratic primary, coming in third behind incumbent Delegate Anne Kaiser and political staffer Craig Zucker.

Name	Votes	Percent	Outcome
Anne Kaiser (incumbent)	6380	24.1%	Won
Craig Zucker	6216	23.5%	Won
Eric Luedtke	3696	14%	Won
Jodi Finkelstein	3154	11.9%	Lost
Robert "Bo" Newsome	2834	10.7%	Lost
Gerald Roper	1660	6.3%	Lost
Neeta Datt	1288	4.9%	Lost
Vanessa Ali	1244	4.7%	Lost

=== 2010 General Election ===
In the 2010 General Election, Democratic nominees Anne Kaiser, Eric Luedtke and Craig Zucker faced Republican nominees Patricia Fenati, Henry Kahwaty and Maria Peña-Faustino. All Democratic candidates won in a landslide, with Luedtke placing third.

Name	Votes	Percent	Outcome
Anne Kaiser (incumbent)	23503	21.5%	Won
Craig Zucker	22148	20.2%	Won
Eric Luedtke	21165	19.3%	Won
Patricia Fenati	14866	13.6	Lost
Henry Kahwaty	14152	12.9%	Lost
Maria Peña-Faustino	13639	12.5%	Lost

=== 2014 Elections ===
In 2014, Luedtke, Kaiser, and Zucker ran for re-election. They faced only a single challenger in the primary, winning by wide margins. In the General Election, the three incumbents beat back a strong challenge from Republican candidates buoyed by the off-year wave election and the election of Republican Governor Larry Hogan.

Maryland House of Delegates
Preceded by Kathleen Dumais	Majority Leader of the Maryland House of Delegates; 2019–2023	Succeeded by Marc Korman
