= Robert H. Kittleman =

American politician

Member of the Maryland Senate from the 9th district
- In office January 8, 2003 – September 11, 2004
- Preceded by: Andy Harris
- Succeeded by: Allan H. Kittleman

Member of the Maryland Senate from the 14th district
- In office January 11, 2002 – January 8, 2003
- Preceded by: Christopher J. McCabe
- Succeeded by: Rona E. Kramer

Member of the Maryland House of Delegates from the 14B district
- In office January 12, 1983 – January 10, 2002 Serving with Edward J. Kasemeyer, Robert Flanagan
- Preceded by: Hugh Burgess; Anne E. Baker
- Succeeded by: Gail H. Bates

Personal details
- Born: January 31, 1926 Omaha, Nebraska, U.S.
- Died: September 11, 2004 (aged 78) Baltimore, Maryland, U.S.
- Party: Republican
- Spouse(s): Sue Kittleman, Patrica Pyles Kittleman, Trent Kittleman
- Children: 5, including Allan H. Kittleman

Robert H. Kittleman (January 31, 1926 – September 11, 2004) was a state senator in Maryland's District 9, which covers parts of Carroll County and Howard County for the two years prior to his death. Prior to that he was a Maryland state delegate for nearly 19 years in District 14B, which covered parts of Howard and Montgomery County. In the House he served as minority leader for a number of years. He was the father of Maryland former state senator and former Howard County executive Allan H. Kittleman.

== Education ==
Kittleman received his B.S. in engineering from the University of Oklahoma in 1947.

== Career ==
Kittleman served in the United States Navy from 1943-46 stationed at Guam. He then worked for Westinghouse Electric Company for 26 years until 1984. He also was a farmer during this time.

Bob was an active participant in the civil rights movement, pursuing desegregation of Howard County Schools which lasted more than a decade past the 1954 Brown v. Board of Education ruling. As chair of the NAACP Education Committee, he argued their case to the Board of Education (see BOE minutes, page 154) and later became the only white president of the Howard County branch of the NAACP.

He was a chair of the Howard County Republican Central Committee, and was also a member of the Veterans of Foreign Wars (VFW). In 1978 Kittleman ran for the Howard County Council, In 1982, he made his first run for Maryland House of Delegates.

Kittleman received many awards including First Life Achievement Award in 1986 and the John W. Holland Humanitarian Award in 2004.

== Election results ==
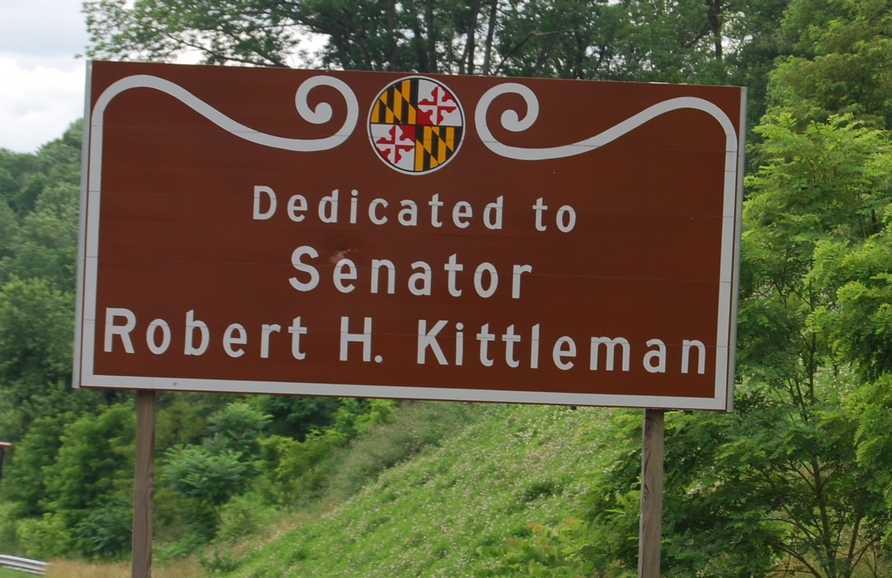
Maryland Route 32 in Howard County is dedicated to former Senator Robert Kittleman.

Year	Office	Election	Subject	Party	Votes	%	Opponent	Party	Votes	%	Opponent	Party	Votes	%
1978	Howard County Council, District 5	General	Robert H. Kittleman	Republican										
2002	Maryland State Senate	General	Robert Kittleman	Republican	40,133	98.2%	Write Ins		746					

- 2002 Race for Maryland State Senate – District 4

Name	Votes	Percent	Outcome
Robert H. Kittleman, Rep.	40,133	98.2%	Won
Other Write-Ins	746	1.8%	Lost

== References and notes ==
Maryland House of Delegates
Preceded by Hugh Burgess; Anne E. Baker	Member of the Maryland House of Delegates from the 14B district 1983–2002; Served alongside: Edward J. Kasemeyer, Robert Flanagan	Succeeded by Gail H. Bates
Maryland Senate
Preceded by Christopher J. McCabe	Member of the Maryland Senate from the 14th district 2002–2003	Succeeded by Rona E. Kramer
Preceded by Andy Harris	Member of the Maryland Senate from the 9th district 2003–2004	Succeeded by Allan H. Kittleman
