= Herman L. Taylor Jr. =

American politician

Herman Taylor
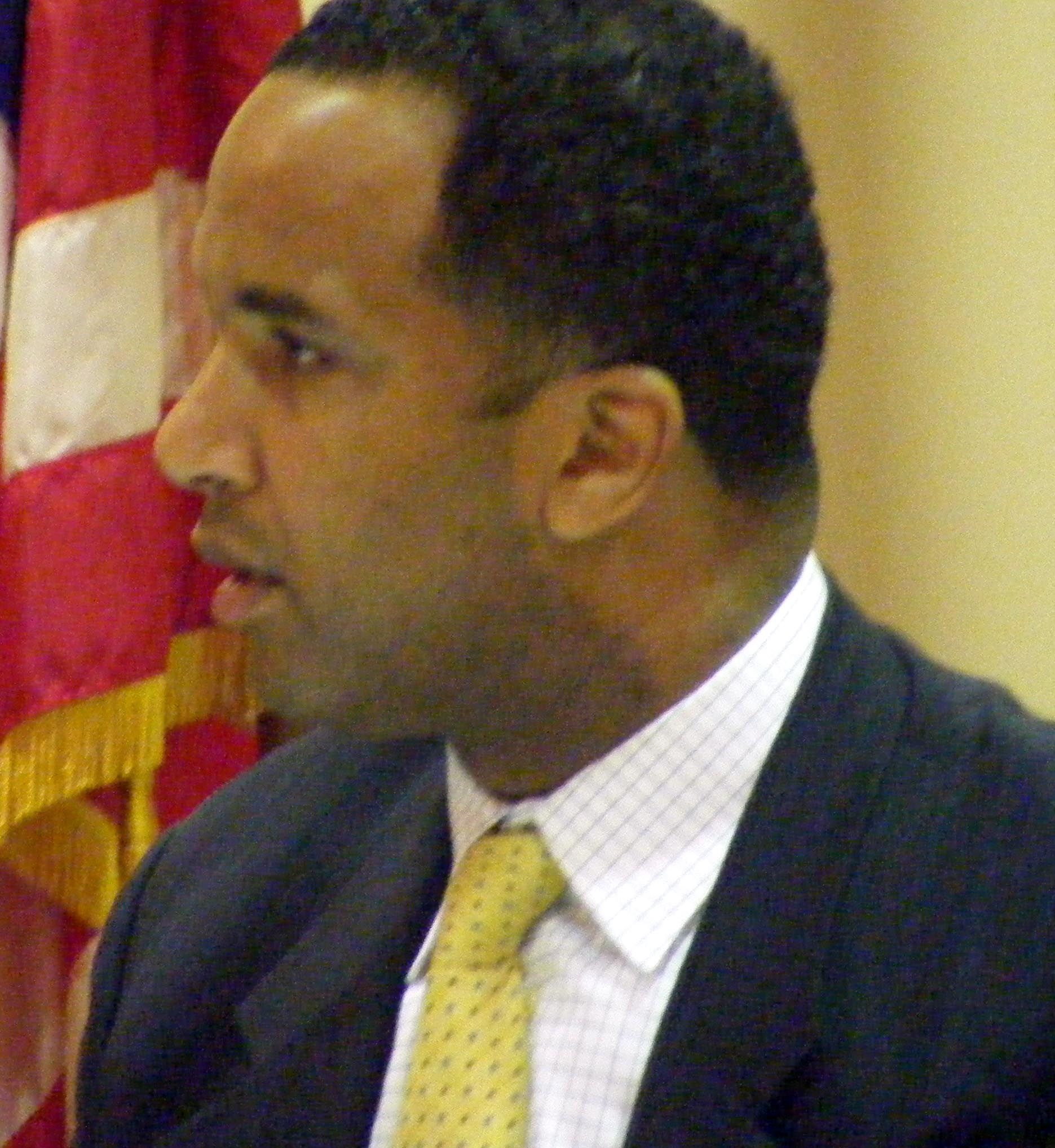

Member of the Maryland House of Delegates from the 14th district
- In office January 10, 2003 – January 12, 2011
- Preceded by: Tod David Sher
- Succeeded by: Craig Zucker, Eric Luedtke
- Constituency: Montgomery County, Maryland

Personal details
- Born: December 9, 1966 (age 59) United States
- Party: Democratic
- Profession: Small business owner

Herman L. Taylor Jr. is an American politician who served as a member of the Maryland House of Delegates from 2003-2011 in Maryland's 14th Legislative District. District 14 includes parts of Silver Spring, Calverton, Colesville, Cloverly, Fairland, Burtonsville, Olney, Brookeville, Laytonsville, Damascus, Ashton and Sandy Spring in Montgomery County. He is the founder of the Minority Business Economic Council.

== In the Legislature ==
Delegate Taylor was first elected to the Maryland House of Delegates in 2002 and re-elected in 2006. He serves on the House Economic Matters Committee and is Chairman of the Subcommittee on Unemployment Insurance. He is the current Co-Chair of the Joint Committee on Unemployment Insurance Oversight. He has served on the Banking, Economic Development, Science & Technology Subcommittee, and is currently a member of the Business Regulation Subcommittee and the Public Utilities Subcommittee.

Delegate Taylor served as the Historian of the Legislative Black Caucus of Maryland in 2003. From 2006–2008 he was the Second Vice Chair of that Caucus and is currently Chairman of the Economic Development Committee and Co-Chair of the Legislative Review Committee. He is also a member of the Maryland Veterans Caucus and the Maryland Democratic Business Caucus.

Delegate Taylor has received several prominent awards while serving in public office. In 2003, the Maryland State Department of Education presented him with the 2003 Award of Excellence in Education. In 2004, he was named Legislator of the Month by the Center for Policy Alternatives for his work on the Living Wage bill. In 2006, he was given the Clean Energy Partnership Award. Recently, he was awarded the Bethune-DuBois Institute Award and The Arc of Montgomery County Community Builder Award. He also received the 2008 Public Service Award by the Alpha Phi Alpha fraternity for his work on securing funding for the Washington, DC Martin Luther King Jr. National Memorial. He was named the 2008 Legislator of the Year by the Washington DC Building and Construction Trades Council.

Taylor retired from the House of Delegates to run for Congress in 2010.

=== Legislative notes ===
- voted for the Clean Indoor Air Act of 2007 (HB359)
- voted for the Healthy Air Act in 2006 (SB154)
- voted against slots in 2005 (HB1361)
- voted in favor of in-state tuition for illegal immigrants in 2007 (HB6)
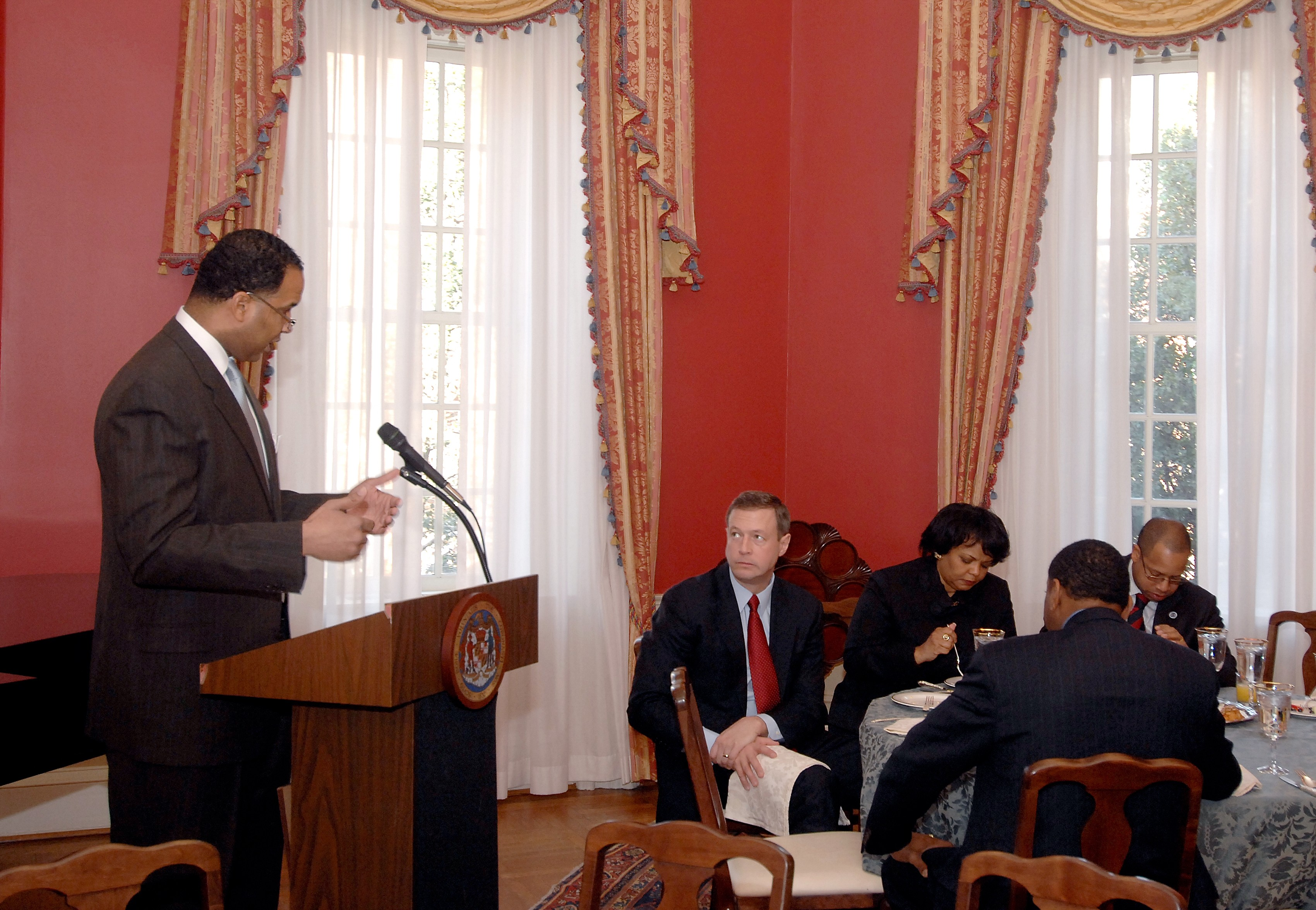
- Herman Taylor speaking
  voted in favor of increasing the sales tax by 20% - Tax Reform Act of 2007(HB2)

== Personal background ==
In addition to his public service, Delegate Taylor was the President & CEO of his Deskmate Office Products company for 20 years. His company is one of the largest minority owned office products distributors in the Washington metropolitan area. Delegate Taylor received The Washington Metropolitan Top Forty under 40 Award for his business and, in 1995, he was named one of the 50 Leaders of Tomorrow in the golden anniversary issue of Ebony magazine. He has served on advisory boards for Capital Bank and FCNB Bank, and has been a member of the Task Force on Lending Equity within Financial Institutions Providing State Depository Services since 2005. Taylor's community service has included involvement with the Rainbow/Push Coalition's Wall Street Project, the National Coalition of Minority Businesses, the Smithsonian Anacostia Museum, the African-American History and Culture, the Washington Adventist Hospital Foundation, the Olney Theatre, the Boys and Girls Club of Greater Washington, and the ARC (formerly Association for Retarded Citizens). He is currently the Managing Director of the Minority Business Economic Council and serves the minority owned businesses around the Maryland area.

Taylor also made appearances on Bravo's The Real Housewives of Potomac as Gizelle Bryant's boyfriend

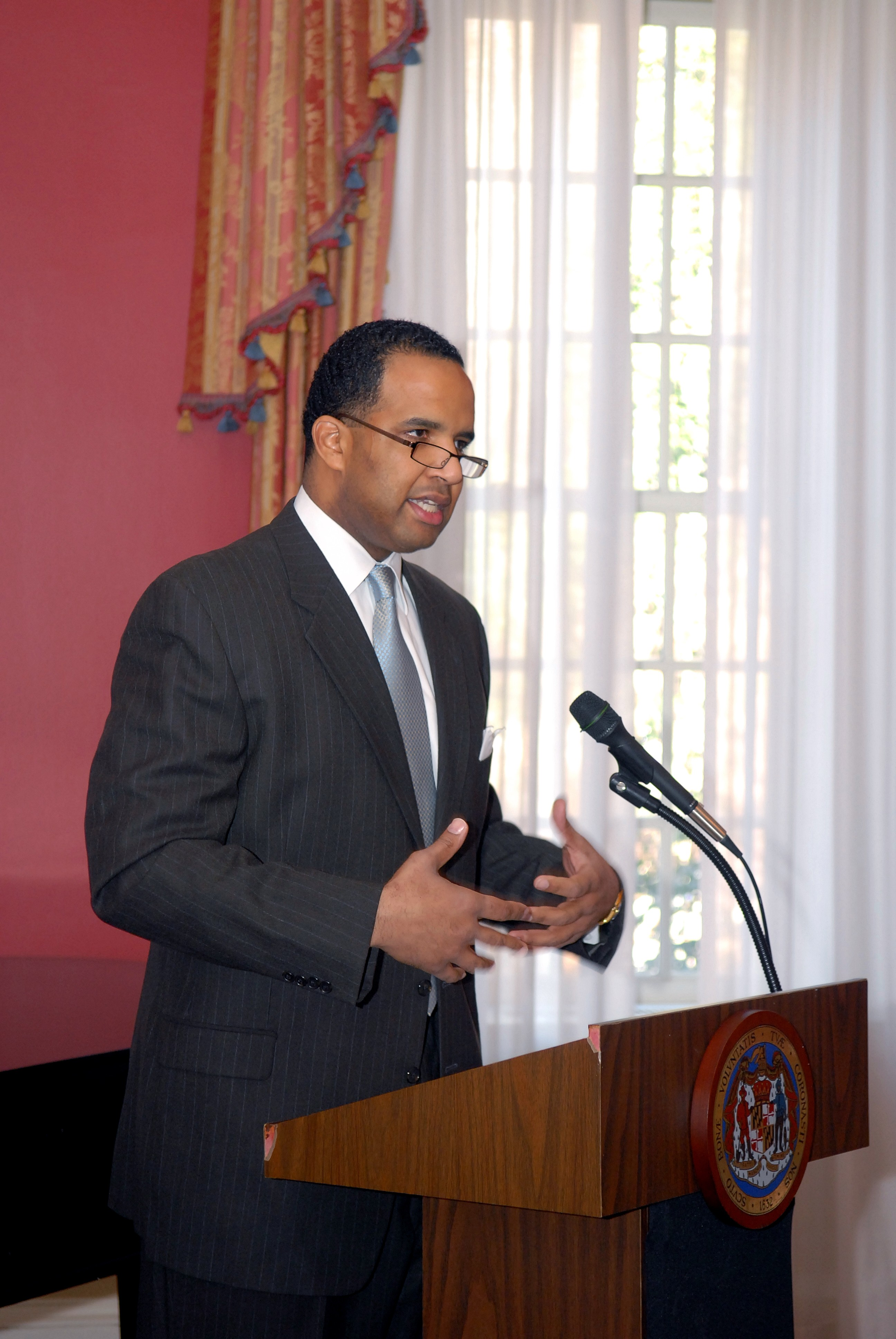
Herman Taylor Talking

== 2010 Congressional Campaign ==
In 2010, Herman Taylor announced he was retiring from the House of Delegates to run for Congress in Maryland's 4th congressional district. He was defeated in the Democratic primary by Donna Edwards.
