= Karen S. Montgomery =

American politician (1935–2026)

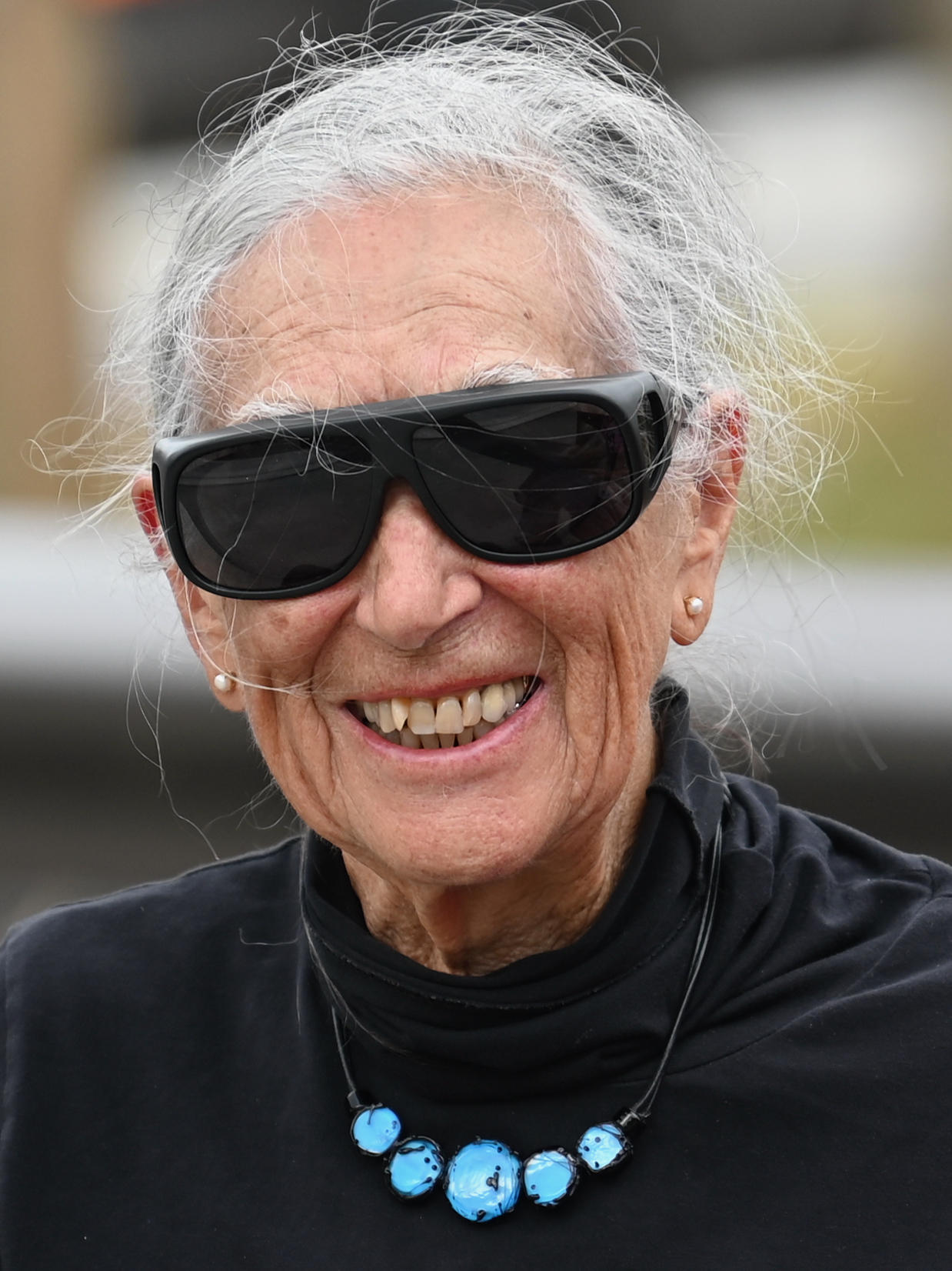
- Montgomery in 2023

Member of the Maryland Senate from the 14th district
- In office January 12, 2011 – January 1, 2016
- Preceded by: Rona E. Kramer
- Succeeded by: Craig Zucker

Personal details
- Born: August 23, 1935
- Died: June 21, 2026 (aged 90)
- Party: Democratic
- Spouse: Harry

Karen Slater Montgomery (August 23, 1935 – June 21, 2026) was an American politician and artist from the state of Maryland. A member of the Democratic Party, she served as the state senator for the Maryland State Senate from Maryland's 14th District, which includes parts of Silver Spring, Burtonsville, Olney, Barnesville, Brookeville, Laytonsville, and Damascus in Montgomery County in the Washington, D.C. suburbs. She was elected in 2010 and reelected in 2014. From 2002 to 2010 she served as a member of the Maryland House of Delegates. She resigned from her senate position on January 1, 2016, because of vision problems that limited her ability to drive at night.

== Education and professional life ==
Montgomery earned her undergraduate degree from Towson University and later a Master of Fine Arts degree from the George Washington University. She would serve as a part-time faculty member in the Fine Arts Department at George Washington University until 1987, also working at the Art Barn and the National Building Museum. In 1987, Montgomery switched careers to work in the non-profit sector for a number of organizations including the Olney Theatre Center, Arts for the Aging, and the Arthritis Foundation, from which she retired in 1999. Both prior to and since her election to public office, Montgomery has volunteered with a variety of community organizations related to the arts, women's issues, and people with developmental disabilities.

She was married and has three grown children. One of her children has autism, which has driven Montgomery's involvement in community organizations that serve people with developmental disabilities, and her political advocacy related to the issue.

== Political career ==
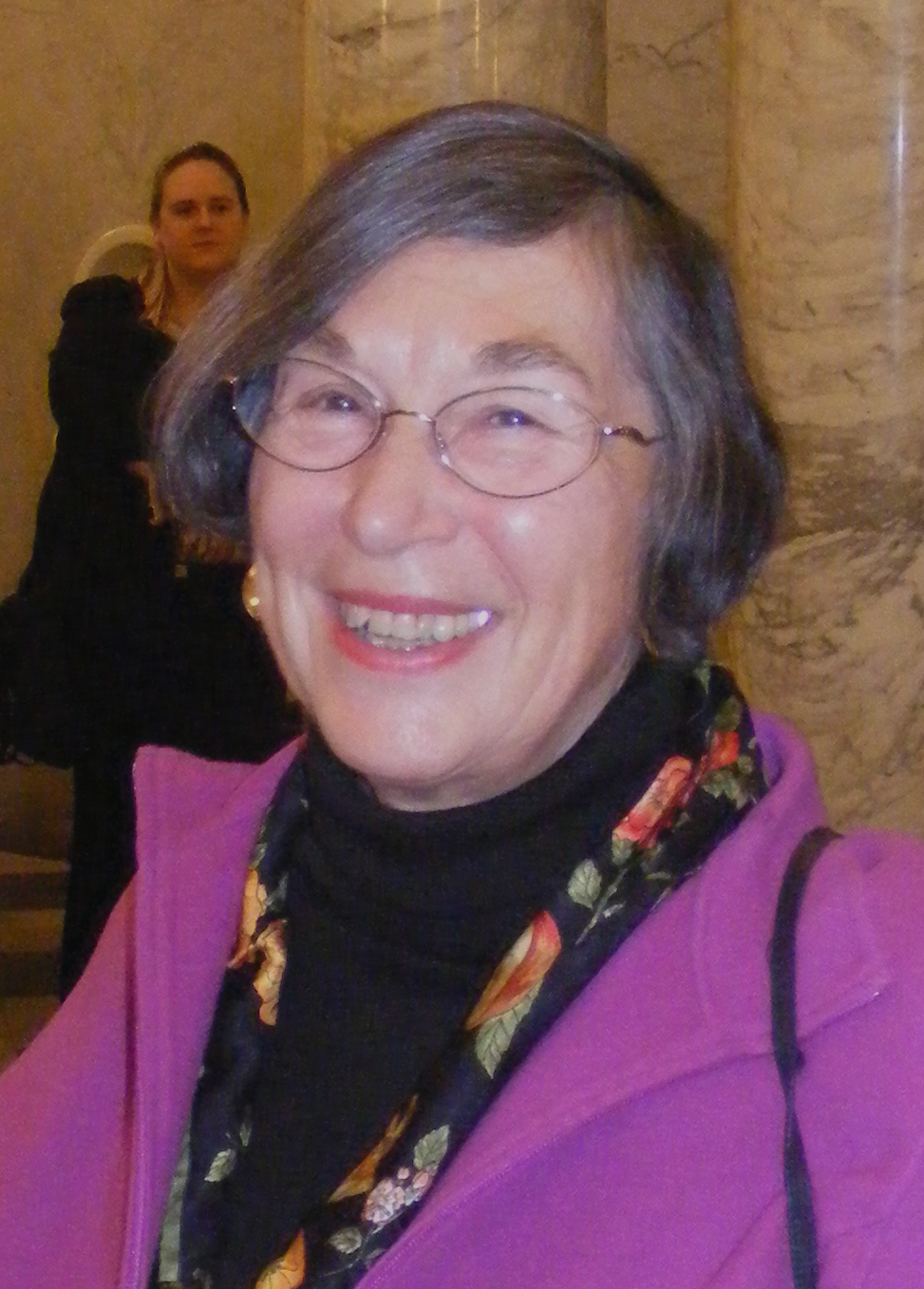
Montgomery in 2008

In 2000, the reapportionment of Maryland state legislative districts following the United States Census led to the creation of a new district in Montgomery County, Maryland, called District 14. Montgomery was one of twelve candidates in the Democratic primary election for the district's three house seats. She finished in second place and won the general election for the seat as well.

During her first term, Montgomery served on the Environmental Matters Committee, and served on a commission on sustainable forestry appointed by the Governor. Following her re-election in 2006, she moved to the Health and Government Operations Committee. There, she has worked on a number of issues related to health care, including funding for the Developmental Disabilities Administration, support for veterans with behavioral health needs, and shortages in the state's health care workforce. She has also served in leadership positions in the Women Legislators of Maryland, the caucus of female legislators in the General Assembly.

Inspired by her son who has autism, Montgomery has been an advocate for better services for people with developmental disabilities. She has argued for better access to early intervention service for young children with autism. In 2009, Montgomery worked to limit state budget cuts to mental health programs and services to people with developmental disabilities. These programs were under threat due to a budget deficit in the state related to the late 2000s recession.

In addition to her work on behalf of people with developmental disabilities, Montgomery has been active on health care, good government, and environmental issues. She has been the lead sponsor of a bill that would create a single payer universal health care system in the state of Maryland. In 2008, she introduced a bill giving certain property owners the right to install solar panels despite historic designations on their properties. Montgomery also worked to ensure that touch screen voting machines had a voter-verifiable paper record for use in recounts.

In the 2010 elections, Montgomery challenged incumbent Senator Rona E. Kramer in the Democratic primary and defeated her by less than 200 votes. Herman L. Taylor, Jr. also left the House of Delegates that year, leaving two Delegate seats open in District 14. Craig Zucker and Eric Luedtke won the two open House of Delegates seats in November 2010. In early 2016, Zucker was appointed to the District 14 senate office, replacing Montgomery after she resigned on January 1, 2016.

== Death ==
Montgomery died on June 21, 2026.

== Legacy ==
In October 2023, the Brookeville Bypass along Maryland Route 97 was officially dedicated to Montgomery and former Brookville town commissioner Clyde Unglesbee.
