= Amy Brooks =

American politician (born 1977/1978)

Member-elect of the Maryland House of Delegates from the 13th district
- Assuming office January 13, 2027
- Succeeding: Jen Terrasa

Personal details
- Born: 1977 or 1978 (age 48–49)
- Party: Democratic
- Children: 3

Amy R. Brooks (born 1977 or 1978) is an American politician and teacher who is a member-elect of Maryland House of Delegates from the 13th district. She is a member of the Democratic Party.

== Background ==
Brooks was born in 1977 or 1978. She holds a Bachelor of Arts degree in English and African-American studies, and a Master of Arts degree in teaching. Brooks was an English teacher at Mergenthaler Vocational-Technical High School, Frederick Douglass High School, Oakland Mills High School. She was also a member of the Howard County Library System's Racial Equity Alliance.

Brooks first ran for the Maryland House of Delegates in the 13th district in 2022, placing fourth in the Democratic primary with 17.3 percent of the vote. In December 2025, after state delegate Vanessa Atterbeary announced that she would resign from the Maryland House of Delegates, Brooks applied to serve the remainder of Atterbeary's term. The Howard County Democratic Central Committee voted to nominate immigration attorney Gabriel Moreno to the seat in January 2026, with Moreno receiving thirteen votes and Brooks receiving two votes. Brooks ran for the district again in 2026, this time running on a slate with incumbents Guy Guzzone, Pam Guzzone, and Moreno.

Brooks will be sworn in on January 13, 2027. She will be a member of the Environment and Transportation Committee.

== Personal life ==
Brooks has three sons. She and her family moved to Columbia, Maryland, in 2008.

== Electoral history ==
Maryland House of Delegates District 13 Democratic primary election, 2022
Party	Candidate	Votes	%
Democratic	Vanessa Atterbeary (incumbent)	11,663	29.9
Democratic	Jennifer R. Terrasa (incumbent)	9,249	23.7
Democratic	Pam Guzzone	7,760	19.9
Democratic	Amy R. Brooks	6,756	17.3
Democratic	Becca Niburg	3,561	9.1
