= Howard County Delegation =

Delegation in the Maryland General Assembly

Howard County

The Howard County Delegation refers to the delegates and senators who represent the legislative districts in or shared by Howard County, Maryland in the Maryland General Assembly. In each county's Senate and House Delegation, a chair is chosen from the party that has a majority within the delegation.

== Authority and responsibilities ==
The Delegation is responsible for representing the interests, needs and concerns of the citizens of Howard County in the Maryland General Assembly.

== Current members ==
As of 2023, the current members of the Howard County Delegation are:

=== Senate ===
District	Counties represented	Senator	Party	First elected	Committee
9	Howard, Montgomery	Katie Fry Hester	Democratic	2018	Education, Energy, and the Environment
12	Anne Arundel, Howard	Clarence Lam	Democratic	2018	Finance
13	Howard	Guy Guzzone	Democratic	2014	Budget and Taxation (Chair)

=== House of Delegates ===
District	Counties represented	Delegate	Party	First elected	Committee
9A	Howard, Montgomery	Chao Wu	Democratic	2022	Ways and Means
9A	Howard, Montgomery	Natalie Ziegler	Democratic	2022	Environment and Transportation
9B	Howard	Courtney Watson (politician)	Democratic	2018	Appropriations
12A	Howard	Jessica Feldmark	Democratic	2018	Ways and Means
12A	Howard	Terri Hill	Democratic	2014	Health and Government Operations
13	Howard	Vanessa Atterbeary	Democratic	2014	Ways and Means (Chair)
13	Howard	Pam Lanman Guzzone	Democratic	2022	Health and Government Operations
13	Howard	Jen Terrasa	Democratic	2018	Environment and Transportation

== See also ==
- Current members of the Maryland State Senate
- Current members of the Maryland House of Delegates
