= Guzzone =

Guzzone is a surname. Notable people with the surname include:

- Guy Guzzone (born 1964), American politician
- Pam Guzzone (born 1963), American politician
