= Neil F. Quinter =

American politician

Member of the Maryland House of Delegates from the 13th district
- In office January 8, 2003 – January 10, 2007 Serving with Shane Pendergrass, Frank S. Turner
- Preceded by: John A. Giannetti Jr.
- Succeeded by: Guy Guzzone

Personal details
- Born: 1962 (age 63–64) New Haven, Connecticut
- Party: Democratic Party (United States)
- Spouse: Married
- Children: 3 children

Neil F. Quinter is an American politician who formerly served in the Maryland House of Delegates.

== Background ==
Born in New Haven, Connecticut in 1962. Quinter attended Montgomery County, Maryland, public schools, Colgate University, (B.A. international relations/political science, summa cum laude, 1985), and the Harvard University Law School (J.D., cum laude, 1988). He was a law clerk to Judge Herbert F. Murray, U.S. District Court for the District of Maryland from 1988 to 1989. and was admitted to Maryland Bar in 1988.

He is of Counsel at McDermott Will & Emery.

== Political history ==
Quinter had been a member of House of Delegates from January 8, 2003, to January 10, 2007. He served on the Judiciary Committee with Joseph F. Vallario, Jr., Curt Anderson and Jill P. Carter. He chaired the Howard County Delegation from 2004 to 2005. He introduced a bill increasing penalties against video voyeurism.

=== Bid for Congress ===
Quinter had announced that he was laying the groundwork for a campaign for the nomination for Maryland's Third Congressional District in 2006. A seat being vacated by 10 term Congressman Ben Cardin who was running for U.S. Senate. His primary opponents would have been former Baltimore Health Commissioner Peter Beilenson, State Senator Paula Hollinger and John Sarbanes; however, Quinter withdrew from the race and tried to regain his seat in the House of Delegates. He was unseated by County Councilman Guy Guzzone, who had considered a race for County Executive, but chose to run for the House of Delegates, as that post would allow Mr. Guzzone to spend more time with his family. The race was fairly close, but Mr. Guzzone prevailed as he was well known in Howard county having been county council president.

== See also ==
- Politics of the United States
