= Shane Pendergrass =

American politician (born 1950)

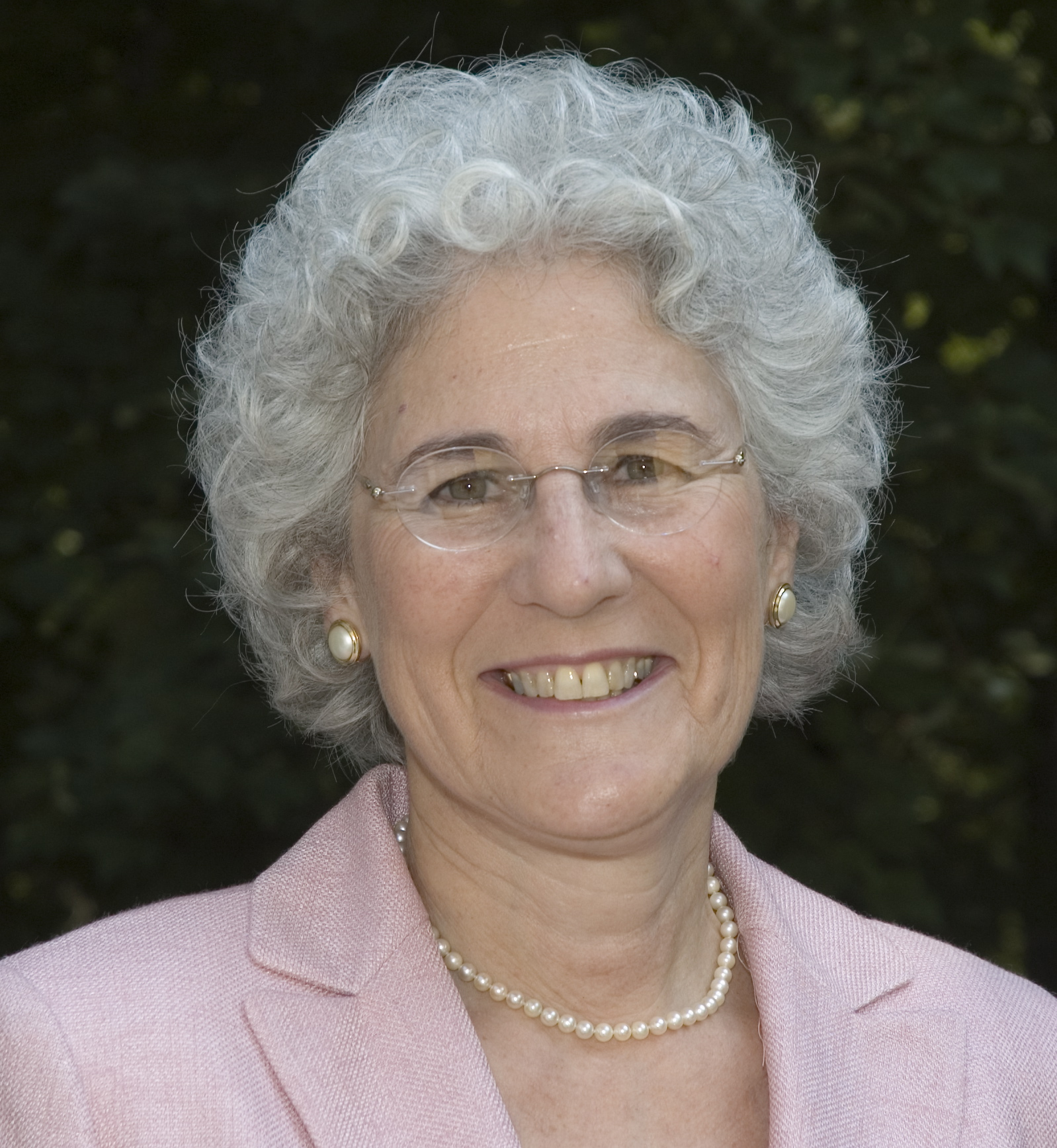

Member of the Maryland House of Delegates from the 13th district
- In office January 11, 1995 – January 11, 2023 Serving with Frank S. Turner (1995–2019); Vanessa Atterbeary (2015–2023) and Jennifer R. Terrasa (2019–2023)
- Preceded by: Martin G. Madden
- Succeeded by: Pam Guzzone

Member, Howard County Council, 1st district
- In office December 1986 – December 1994
- Preceded by: Ruth U. Keeton
- Succeeded by: Darrel E. Drown

Personal details
- Born: March 14, 1950 (age 76) Los Angeles, California
- Party: Democratic
- Children: 2
- Education: University of Illinois (BFA, MA)
- Occupation: Politician, art teacher

Shane Pendergrass is an American politician from Maryland and a member of the Democratic Party. She served seven terms in the Maryland House of Delegates, representing Maryland's District 13 in Howard County. She retired in January 2023 as Chair Emeritus of the Health and Government Operations Committee.

== Political career ==
Shane Pendergrass began her career in government and politics as a community activist for slower growth and an adequate number of public schools in the county. She decided to run for office after learning that her daughter and other students were taking tests not at a desk but while seated on the cafetorium floor of their crowded school. She was elected to the Howard County Council in 1986 and served until 1994, when she won a seat representing Maryland's Legislative District 13 in the Maryland General Assembly.

Pendergrass served as Vice Chair of the Health and Government Operations (HGO) Committee from 2007 to 2016, until she was appointed Chair in 2017. During her tenure on the HGO committee, she has served in various capacities. Since 2003, she has been a member of the Insurance Subcommittee, including serving as chair from 2005 to 2016. From 2015 to 2016, she was a member of the Estates and Trusts Committee; from 2007 to 2015, she was on the Health Facilities & Occupations Subcommittee; in 2006, she was member of the Minority Health Disparities Subcommittee; from 2003 to 2005, she was a member of the Pharmaceuticals Subcommittee and the Joint Committee on Health Care Delivery and Financing; in 2005, she chaired the Health Occupations Subcommittee; and from 2003 to 2004, she served on the Long Term Care Subcommittee.

Pendergrass served on the Economic Matters Committee Committees - Legislative Policy Committee from 1995 to 2002, including as Vice Chair of the Science and Technology Subcommittee from 1999 until 2002, when she was assigned to the newly created Health and Government Operations Committee.

Pendergrass served as the House of Delegates' Deputy Majority Leader in 2007. She has also served since 2007 on the Legislative Policy Committee Committees - Legislative Policy Committee, which supervises and coordinates the standing committees of the General Assembly, and the Rules and Executive Nominations Committee Committees - Rules and Executive Nominations Committee. In 2014, she served on the Joint Oversight Committee of the Maryland Health Benefit Exchange. From 2005 to 2007, she was a member of the Task Force to Study Electronic Health Records and of the Joint Legislative Task Force on Small Group Market Health Insurance. In 2004, she was a member of the House Medical Malpractice Workgroup. She is a member of the Women's Caucus. She has served as chair of the Howard County Delegation from 1997-2000, 2005-2006 and 2015-2016.

Pendergrass' committee assignments led her to develop an interest and expertise in health insurance issues. Over the course of her legislative career, she has sponsored numerous bills with the goal of making health care accessible and effective for Marylanders, including a 2001 bill to provide affordable prescription drug coverage to seniors. That bill was ultimately incorporated into a comprehensive health bill that became law. In 2007, she was among the first legislators to begin advocating for Electronic Health Records, including sponsoring a law passed in 2008 Search - Legislation that allowed for electronic signatures. Pendergrass also sponsored successful legislation halting the proposed conversion of CareFirst Blue Cross/Blue Shield to a for-profit company, and a subsequent bill establishing increased oversight of the CareFirst Board of Directors. She was active in the Medical Malpractice workgroup and sponsored a successful law in 2006 requiring public reporting of Healthcare-Associated Infections rates in the state-mandated "Hospital Report Card."

Pendergrass was a strong defender of abortion rights, including co-sponsoring the Abortion Care Access Act in 2022, which the General Assembly passed over the veto of Gov. Larry Hogan. The law allows nurse practitioners, licensed certified midwives, and other trained professionals to perform abortions, in addition to physicians. It also provides $3.5 million for training of abortion providers. In May 2022, after a leaked draft of a decision in the Supreme Court's Dobbs v Jackson Women's Health Organization portended the end of a constitutional right to an abortion, lawmakers in the Women's Legislative Caucus of Maryland called on Hogan to release the training funding a year early, in July 2022. He refused to do so.

In 2017, she sponsored legislation guaranteeing funding for Planned Parenthood services in the event the Trump administration carried out its threat to end Title X funding.

She also took steps to safeguard the separation of church and state, objecting to prayers "in Jesus' name, Amen." Early in her career, she objected to these explicitly sectarian prayers by slamming her desk top in the House chamber. Instead of clergy delivering religious prayers, the House of Delegates members now offer reflections.

During the COVID-19 pandemic, she criticized the Hogan administration's handling of reimbursements for behavioral health services. On July 30, 2021, she issued a rebuke to Maryland Secretary of Health Dennis Schrader for his failure to appear at a joint legislative briefing about reimbursement rates, home health care programs and telehealth during the Covid State of Emergency. Instead, the deputy secretary Webster Ye attended. After 5 minutes and 42 seconds, Pendergrass ended the meeting and rescheduled it.

During the 2022 session, she rebuked Delegate Dan Cox, who would later mount a failed run for governor of Maryland on the Republican Party ticket, after he compared a bill related to children seeking mental health services without a parents' consent to the Nazi experiments on children during Holocaust.

On November 29, 2021, Pendergrass announced that she would not seek an eighth term in 2022. The Maryland House of Delegates honored her on the House floor, including with a speech from Delegate Joseline Peña-Melnyk, then vice chair of the Health and Government Operations Committee.

== Legislative notes ==
- Co-sponsored the Abortion Care Access Act, allowing nurse-midwives, physicians assistants and other qualified providers to perform abortions, along with physicians. It also mandates $3.5 million for the state Department of Mental Health to operate an Abortion Care Clinical Training Program Fund. She was among the lawmakers who called on Governor Hogan to release the training funding a year early, in July 2022, after the leaked draft of the Dobbs decision indicated the Supreme Court would overturn the constitutional right to an abortion
- Sponsored a bill (HB1083)Legislation - HB1083 in 2017 to make $2.7 million available for family planning through Planned Parenthood, guaranteeing women access to health care in the event the federal government revokes Title X funding.
- Has sponsored the End of Life Option Act, which would allow terminally ill adult patients to take medication to aid in dying under certain conditions. This bill was unsuccessful in the 2015, 2016, 2017 and 2019 General Assembly sessions. In the 2019 General Assembly session, however, the bill HB0399 passed in the House of Delegates but failed in a tie vote in the Senate. (2020 : HB643; 2019 : HB399; 2017: HB 370 Legislation - HB0370; 2016: HB 0404 Legislation - HB0370; and 2015: HB 1021 )
- Sponsored a bill (HB0403)Legislation - HB0403 in 2017 that allows exceptions to the prohibition on doctors referring patients to health-care entities where they have a compensation arrangement. The goal is better coordination of patient care. The Maryland Insurance Commissioner reviews all exceptions.
- Co-sponsored a bill (HB1325) Legislation - HB1325 in 2017 that bans hydraulic fracturing (fracking) in Maryland.
- Co-sponsored a bill (HB0429) Legislation - HB0429 in 2017 that ensures that physical resistance is not needed to prove a sexual crime has been committed.
- Co-sponsored the Maryland Defense Act of 2017 (HB0913) Legislation - HB0913, which authorizes the Attorney General to sue the federal government to defend the welfare and public interests of Maryland residents.
- Sponsored a bill (HB0356)Legislation - HB0356 in 2016 to create a pilot project, using a federal grant, that would offer incentives for Supplemental Nutrition Assistance Program (SNAP) participants to buy and eat more fruits and vegetables.
- Co-sponsored the Civil Marriage Protection Act (HB 438) Search - Legislation in 2012 to legalize same-sex marriage.
- Co-sponsored several bills related to the Maryland Health Benefit Exchange Act, including its creation in 2011 (HB 166)Search - Legislation, privacy and security of medical records (HB 784)Search - Legislation, and updates in 2012 (HB 443)Search - Legislation to add dental and vision plans.
- Sponsored a bill (HB 196) to repeal Computer Service Sales Tax in 2008's Special Session
- Co-sponsored Motor Vehicle Excise Tax exemption for returning military members in 2008 (HB669)
- Sponsored a bill (HB 510) Search - Legislation in 2008 that allowed for electronic signatures on medical documents.
- Voted in favor of mortgage reform bills in 2008 to increase oversight of mortgage-lending industry and to establish preemptive measures to help homeowners at risk of foreclosure (HB360, HB 361, & HB 365) , ,
- Voted in 2007 for in-state tuition for undocumented immigrants who graduate from Maryland high schools after attending for at least two years, whose parents pay Maryland taxes and who commit to apply for permanent resident status 30 days after becoming eligible to do so (HB6)
- Voted in favor the Tax Reform Act of 2007(HB2)

== Early life, education and career ==
Pendergrass was born in Los Angeles, CA. She graduated from Fenger High School in Chicago. At the University of Illinois, she earned a Bachelor of Fine Art, graduating cum laude, and a Master of Arts. She was an art instructor at Aurora University and an art therapist and program coordinator at Edgemont Psychiatric Hospital Children's Unit. Later, she was an art instructor at Severn School, Severna Park, MD. She also worked as a professional artist for many years. She lives in Columbia with her husband, Bill Pendergrass. They have two children and three grandchildren

== Awards ==
- 2013 Public Policy Champion of the Year, Maryland Works Inc.
- 2012 Outstanding Conservation Award, Audubon Society of Central Maryland, 2004, 2009, 2011, 2012
- 2009 Certificate of Appreciation, Howard County NAACP Youth Council
- 2007 The Ruth Keeton Award for Dedicated Service to the Citizens of Howard County, Howard County Women's Bar Association
- 2006 Advocacy Award, Healthcare Information and Management Systems Society
- 2005 Maryland's Top 100 Women, The Daily Record
- 2003 Senator James Clark Award for distinguished public service to the people of Columbia, Howard County Democratic Party
- 2000 Tera Partner Award for spearheading creation of Howard County Technology Incubator, Center for Business and Technology Development

== General election results, 2006 ==
- 2006 Race for Maryland House of Delegates – 13th District

Voters to choose three:

Name	Votes	Percent	Outcome
Guy Guzzone, Democratic	26,891	22.3%	Won
Shane Pendergrass, Democratic	26,633	22.1%	Won
Frank S. Turner, Democratic	24,437	20.3%	Won
Mary Beth Tung, Republican	15,216	12.6%	Lost
Rick Bowers, Republican	13,665	11.4%	Lost
Loretta Gaffney, Republican	13,466	11.2%	Lost
other write-ins	84	0.1%	Lost

- 2010 Race for Maryland House of Delegates – 13th District

Name	Votes	Percent	Outcome
Guy Guzzone, Democratic	27,140	21.9%	Won
Shane Pendergrass, Democratic	25,894	20.9%	Won
Frank S. Turner, Democratic	24,823	20.1%	Won
Mary Beth Tung, Republican	16,225	13.1%	Lost
Rick Bowers, Republican	14,844	12.0%	Lost
Loretta Gaffney, Republican	14,680	11.9%	Lost
other write-ins	91	0.1%	Lost

- 2014 Race for Maryland House of Delegates – 13th District

Name	Votes	Percent	Outcome
Shane Pendergrass, Democratic	23,167	20.8%	Won
Vanessa Atterbeary, Democratic	22,626	20.4%	Won
Frank S. Turner, Democratic	22,169	20.0%	Won
Chris Yates, Republican	14,598	13.1%	Lost
Danny Eaton, Republican	14,434	13.0%	Lost
Jimmy Williams, Republican	14,031	12.6%	Lost
other write-ins	94	0.1%	Lost

- 2018 Race for Maryland House of Delegates – 13th District

Name	Votes	Percent	Outcome
Shane Pendergrass, Democratic	39,470	30.7%	Won
Vanessa Atterbeary, Democratic	36,519	28.4%	Won
Frank S. Turner, Democratic	34,921	27.1%	Won
Chris Yates, Republican	17,258	13.4%	Lost
other write-ins	513	0.4%	Lost
