= Vanessa Atterbeary =

American politician (born 1975)

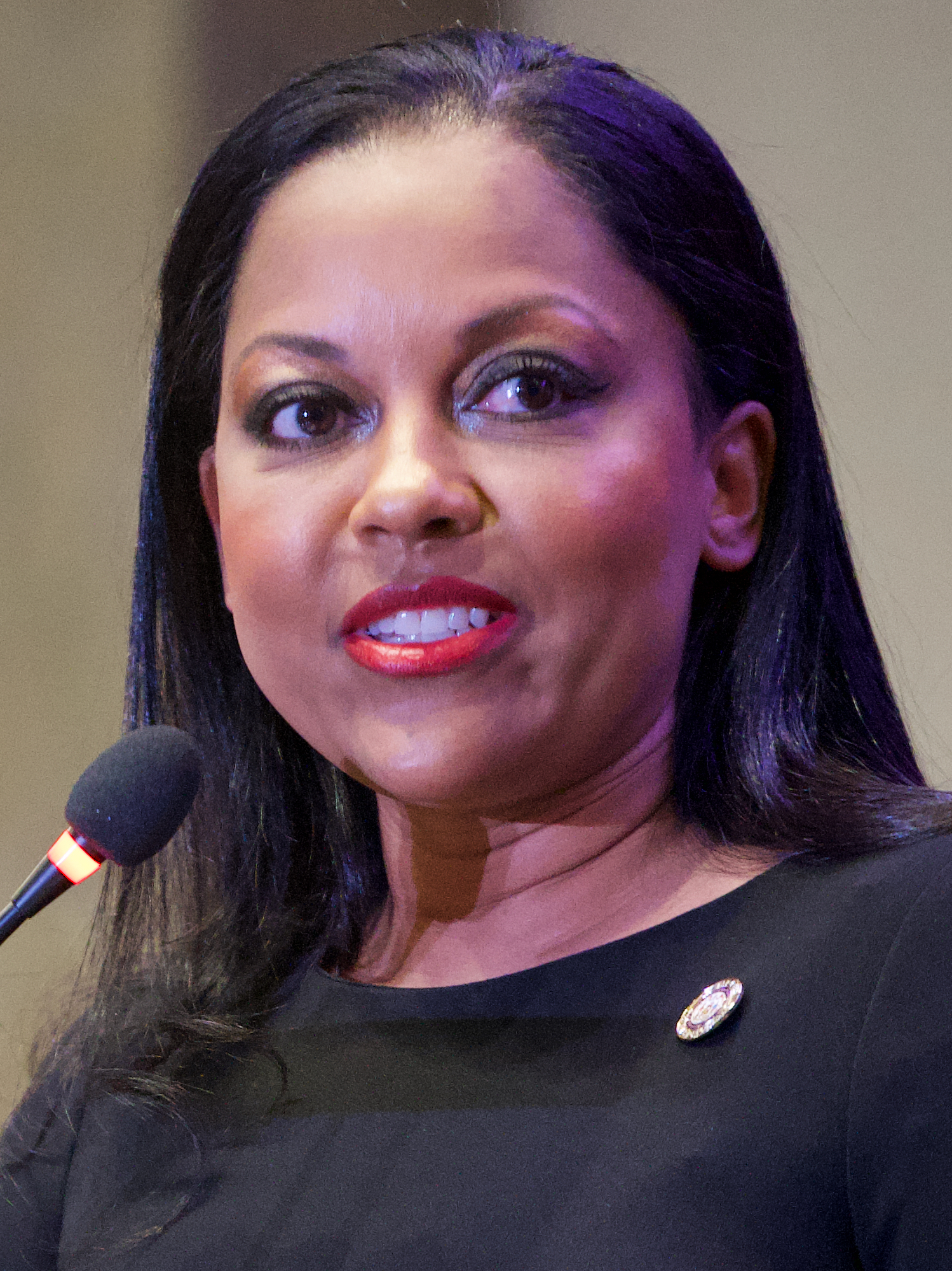
- Atterbeary in 2023

11th County Executive of Howard County
- Assuming office December 7, 2026
- Succeeding: Brandee Ganz (acting)

Member of the Maryland House of Delegates from the 13th district
- In office January 14, 2015 – January 14, 2026
- Preceded by: Guy Guzzone
- Succeeded by: Gabriel Moreno

Personal details
- Born: June 24, 1975 (age 51) Columbia, Maryland, U.S.
- Party: Democratic
- Children: 3
- Education: College of William and Mary (BA); Villanova University (JD)
- Website: Campaign website

Vanessa Elaine Atterbeary (born June 24, 1975) is an American attorney and politician who is the county executive-elect of Howard County, Maryland. A member of the Democratic Party, she previously served as a member of the Maryland House of Delegates representing District 13 from 2015 to 2026.

Born and raised in Columbia, Maryland, she graduated from the College of William and Mary and the Villanova University School of Law. She began her career as a circuit court clerk before becoming an attorney for a local law firm. She was elected to the Maryland House of Delegates in 2014, where she served as the chair of the House Ways and Means Committee from 2021 until her resignation in December 2025. In 2026, Atterbeary was elected as the county executive of Howard County after defeating Green Party nominee Nater Kane in the general election.

== Early life and career ==
Atterbeary was born on June 24, 1975, in Columbia, Maryland. She attended Clemens Crossing Elementary School, Clarksville Middle School, and graduated from Atholton High School. She attended the College of William and Mary, where she earned a bachelor's degree in government in 1997, and the Villanova University School of Law, where she earned a Juris Doctor three years later. While in law school, she started working at a shelter and participated in a clinic to help women gain protective orders. She is a member of the Alpha Kappa Alpha sorority.

After graduating from law school, Atterbeary clerked for Judge David W. Young of the Baltimore City Circuit Court. Atterbeary was admitted to the Maryland Bar in 2001 and the District of Columbia Bar in 2002. In 2002, Atterbeary joined the law firm Bulman, Dunie, Burke & Feld, where she worked as general counsel for five years. At the same time, she served on the Montgomery County Commission for Women, including as president.

Atterbeary first ran for the Maryland House of Delegates in 2010, for the District 18 delegate seat. She came in fifth place in a field of six candidates, receiving 13 percent of the vote in the primary election. In February 2014, Delegate Frank S. Turner approached her about filing to run in District 13, saying that he thought her Howard County roots would make her a more desirable candidate than she was in Montgomery County. She filed to run in the district on February 25, 2014, and ran on a "Team 13" slate with incumbent Delegates Guy Guzzone, Shane Pendergrass, and Turner. She won the Democratic primary with 27.3 percent of the vote.

== Maryland House of Delegates ==
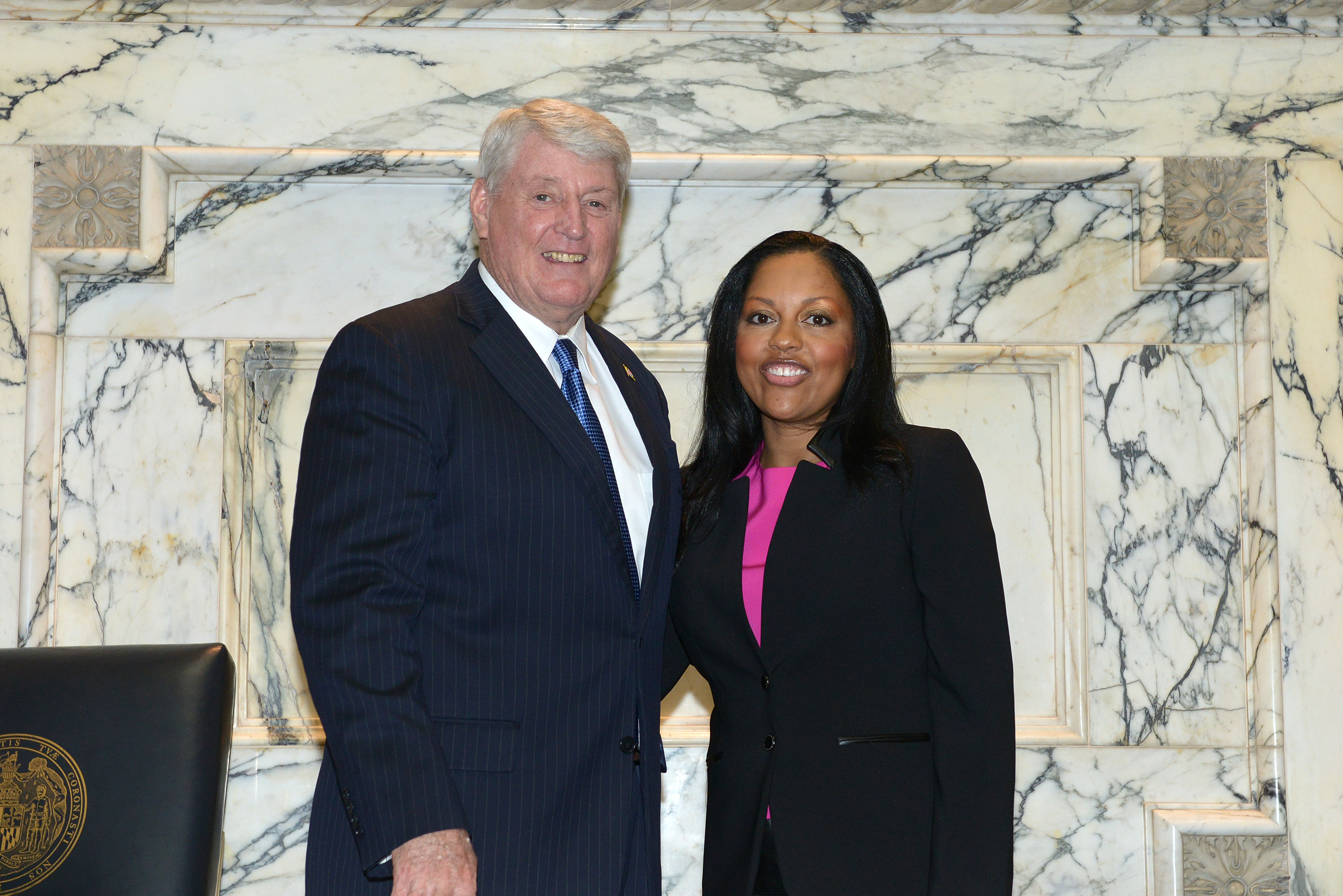
House Speaker Michael E. Busch swears Atterbeary into the Maryland House of Delegates, 2015

Atterbeary was sworn into the Maryland House of Delegates on January 14, 2015. She served as the vice chair of the House Judiciary Committee from 2018 to 2021, afterwards becoming the chair of the House Ways and Means Committee until December 2025. Atterbeary was also a member of the Rules and Executive Nominations Committee, the Women Legislators of Maryland, and the Legislative Black Caucus of Maryland, and previously served as the chair of the Howard County Delegation from 2016 to 2017 and from 2019 to 2020.

In October 2023, after U.S. Representative John Sarbanes announced that he would not run for reelection in 2024, Atterbeary said that she was planning to run to succeed him in Congress. She withdrew from the race in December, saying that she wanted to focus on passing gun control and education funding bills in the upcoming legislative session.

== Howard County Executive ==
=== Elections ===
==== 2026 ====
In September 2025, Atterbeary announced she would not run for reelection in 2026 and would instead run for Howard County executive. In December 2025, she announced that she would resign from the Maryland House of Delegates on January 14, 2026, to focus on her campaign for county executive. The Maryland Reporter and The Baltimore Sun described Atterbeary as the frontrunner of the Democratic primary, during which she supported funding public schools and improving public safety by working closely with police, and received endorsements from U.S. senator Angela Alsobrooks, Governor Wes Moore, and outgoing county executive Calvin Ball III. She was also the only candidate in the race to choose not to use public financing through the Citizens' Election Fund, which prohibits candidates from accepting contributions from political action committees, businesses, or labor organizations. She argued using the Citizens' Election Fund would be "unfair" because she already had resources in an existing campaign account and using public financing would limit her relationship with labor groups.

Atterbeary won the Democratic primary election with 54.9% of the vote on June 23, 2026. She defeated Green Party nominee Nater Kane in the general election with 81.5% percent of the vote, becoming the first African-American woman to serve as Howard County executive.

=== Tenure ===
Atterbeary will be sworn in on December 7, 2026.

== Political positions ==
=== Education ===
Atterbeary introduced legislation in the 2016 legislative session that would put five of the seven members of the Howard County school board up for election. The bill was voted down, but was reintroduced in the 2019 legislative session where it passed unanimously.

Atterbeary introduced legislation in the 2019 legislative session that would remove school resource officers from school buildings.

Atterbeary introduced legislation in the 2019 legislative session that would allow the Howard County Council to raise fees against developers to cover the costs of school construction. Following amendments proposed by her colleagues, she voted against advancing the bill to the House floor. In 2020, she introduced a bill that would require the school board to submit a report addressing its deferred maintenance to the Howard County leaders in October. The bill failed to receive a vote.

In 2020, Atterbeary introduced legislation that would prevent the Howard County school board from enrolling students at schools with capacities greater than 115 percent.

=== Marijuana ===
As chair of the House Ways and Means Committee, Atterbeary helped craft the state's recreational marijuana industry framework bill after voters approved Question 4 in 2022. In February 2023, she admitted that she had reservations on the legalization of recreational marijuana use, citing her tenure on the Judiciary Committee, but said she would focus on making sure the state's marijuana industry was "equitable".

=== Gun policy ===
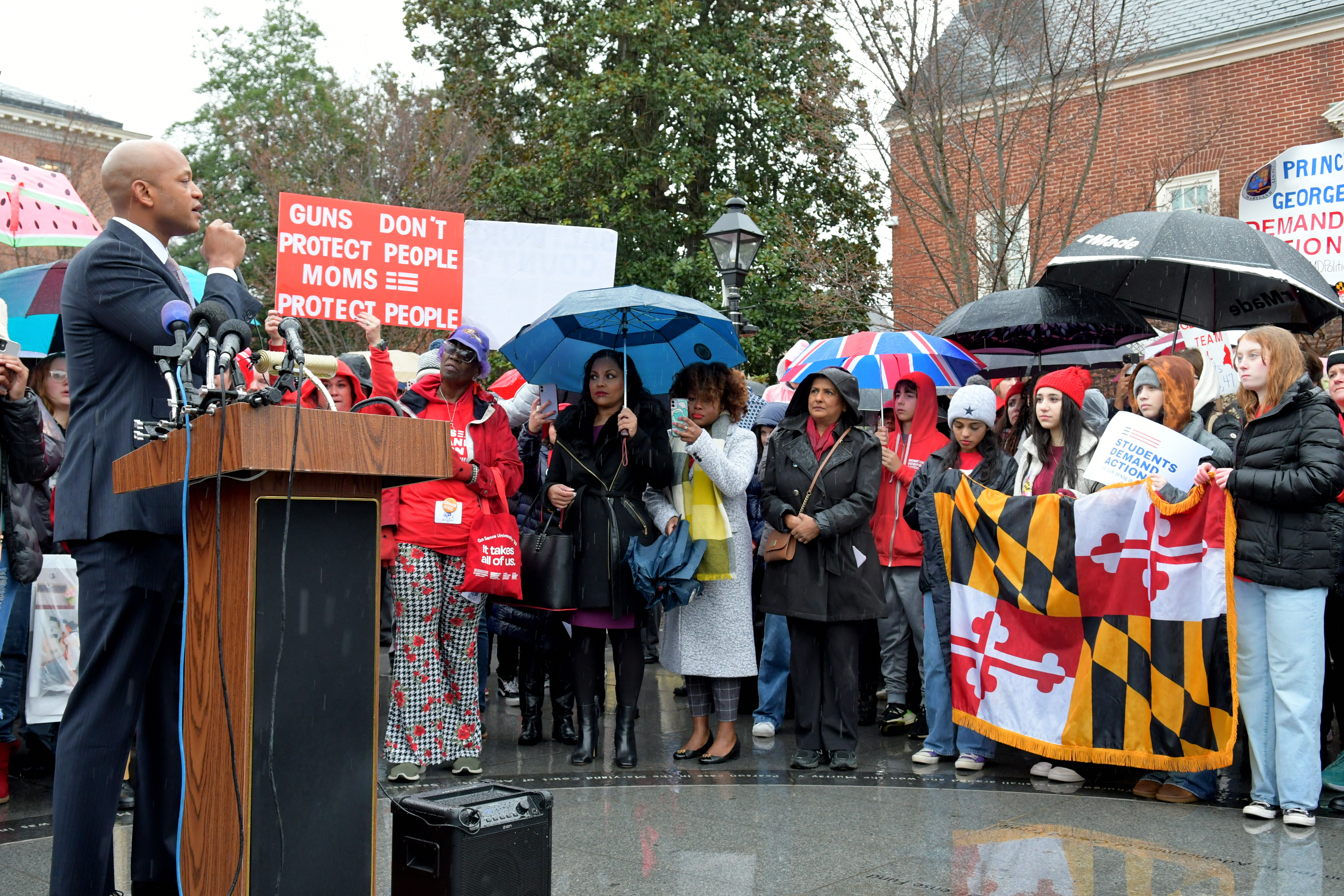
Atterbeary (center) at a Moms Demand Action rally in Annapolis, 2023

Atterbeary introduced legislation in the 2020 legislative session that would require background checks for private sales of long guns. The bill passed and became law through a gubernatorial veto override on February 10, 2021.

In June 2022, Atterbeary condemned the U.S. Supreme Court's ruling in New York State Rifle & Pistol Association, Inc. v. Bruen, calling it "scary". In February 2023, she participated in a Moms Demand Action rally in front of the Maryland State House to support legislation regulating how firearms could be carried and stored.

=== Policing ===
In May 2020, Atterbeary was appointed to chair the Work Group to Address Police Reform and Accountability in Maryland, where she helped craft the Maryland Police Accountability Act of 2021. She opposed a proposed provision that would give jurisdictions the ability to allow independent police oversight boards to make disciplinary decisions. The bill passed and became law through a gubernatorial veto override on April 10, 2021.

In December 2021, Atterbeary said that agencies that did not comply with Anton's Law by issuing high fees or denying access to police records could have funding withheld.

=== Social issues ===
Atterbeary introduced legislation in the 2018 legislative session that would allow judges to admit evidence of past acts in trials of defendants accused of sexual assault.

Atterbeary introduced legislation in the 2019 legislative session that would raise the minimum age for marriage from 15 to 18 years. The bill failed, but was reintroduced in 2021, this time lowering the minimum age to 17 years. The bill was reintroduced and finally became law on April 21, 2022.

During the 2023 legislative session, Atterbeary introduced a bill that would allow spouses to uncouple based on "irreconcilable differences".

== Personal life ==
Atterbeary is married and has three children. She lives in Maple Lawn, Fulton, Maryland.

== Electoral history ==
Maryland House of Delegates District 18 Democratic primary election, 2010
Party	Candidate	Votes	%
Democratic	Ana Sol Gutierrez (incumbent)	7,879	24.1
Democratic	Jeff Waldstreicher (incumbent)	7,386	22.6
Democratic	Al Carr (incumbent)	6,756	20.7
Democratic	Dana Beyer	5,450	16.7
Democratic	Vanessa Atterbeary	4,247	13.0
Democratic	Michael K. Heney	932	2.9

Maryland House of Delegates District 13 Democratic primary election, 2014
Party	Candidate	Votes	%
Democratic	Vanessa Atterbeary	7,399	27.3
Democratic	Shane Pendergrass (incumbent)	7,364	27.1
Democratic	Frank S. Turner (incumbent)	6,941	25.6
Democratic	Nayab Siddiqui	4,204	15.5
Democratic	Fred Eiland	1,225	4.5

Maryland House of Delegates District 13 election, 2014
Party	Candidate	Votes	%
Democratic	Shane Pendergrass (incumbent)	23,167	20.8
Democratic	Vanessa Atterbeary	22,626	20.4
Democratic	Frank S. Turner (incumbent)	22,169	20.0
Republican	Chris Yates	14,598	13.1
Republican	Danny Eaton	14,434	13.0
Republican	Jimmy Williams	14,031	12.6
Write-in		94	0.1

Maryland House of Delegates District 13 election, 2018
Party	Candidate	Votes	%
Democratic	Vanessa Atterbeary (incumbent)	39,470	30.7
Democratic	Shane Pendergrass (incumbent)	36,519	28.4
Democratic	Jennifer R. Terrasa	34,921	27.1
Republican	Chris Yates	17,258	13.4
Write-in		513	0.4

Maryland House of Delegates District 13 election, 2022
Party	Candidate	Votes	%
Democratic	Vanessa Atterbeary (incumbent)	33,045	27.9
Democratic	Jen Terrasa (incumbent)	31,259	26.4
Democratic	Pam Guzzone	31,128	26.2
Republican	Chris Yates	11,874	10.0
Republican	Padraic Walsh	10,792	9.1
Write-in		539	0.5
