= Reid Novotny =

American politician (born 1978)

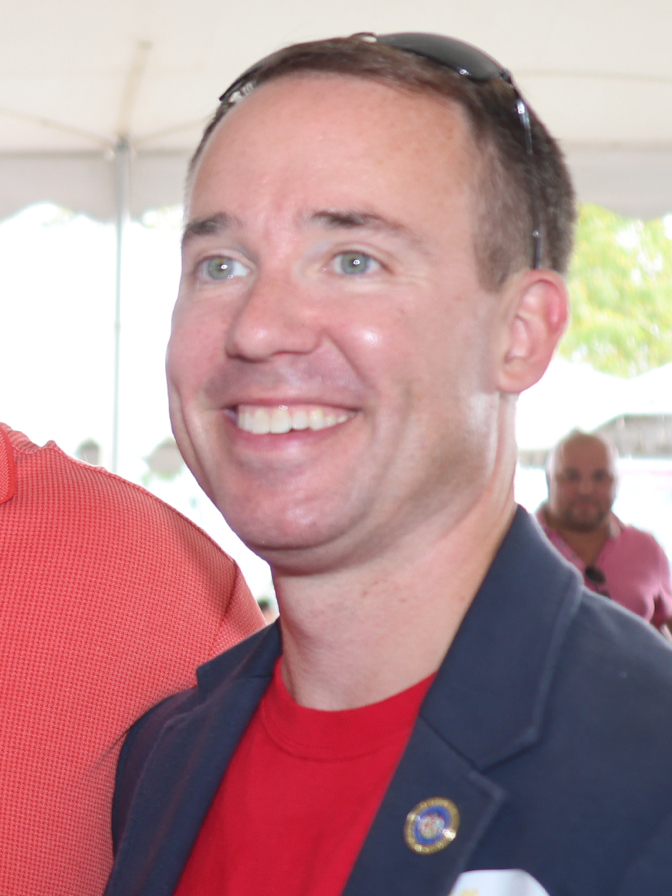

Member of the Maryland House of Delegates from the 9A district
- In office January 13, 2021 – January 11, 2023 Serving with Trent Kittleman
- Preceded by: Warren E. Miller
- Succeeded by: Natalie Ziegler

Personal details
- Born: Reid Justin Novotny; March 22, 1978 (age 48) Anniston, Alabama, U.S.
- Party: Republican
- Spouse: Married
- Children: 1
- Parents: Raymond John Novotny II (father); Linda Ann O'Brien (mother)
- Relatives: Ray, April, Ryan and Ross Novotny
- Education: George Washington University, B.S. (computer science), 2000, M.A. (computer security), 2001; George Mason University, M.A. (strategic communications), 2012.
- Profession: Cybersecurity

Military service
- Branch/service: U.S. Air Force and Maryland Air National Guard
- Rank: Brigadier General
- Unit: 175th Cyberspace Operations Group

Reid Justin Novotny (born March 22, 1978) is an American politician who was a member of the Maryland House of Delegates from District 9A, which includes parts of Howard and Carroll counties, from 2021 to 2023.

== Early life and career ==
Novotny was born on March 22, 1978, in Anniston, Alabama to Raymond John Novotny Jr. and Linda Ann O'Brien. His father is of Czech and Scottish ancestry. His grandfather was American football player Ray Novotny. Novotny graduated from Sandy High School in Sandy, Oregon in 1996 and attended George Washington University in Washington, D.C., where he earned a B.S. degree in computer science in 2000 and a M.S. degree in computer security in 2001, and George Mason University in Fairfax, Virginia, where he earned a M.A. degree in strategic communications in 2012.

After graduating, he commissioned in the United States Air Force, where he served as a Public Affairs Officer until 2013, when he was promoted to serve as Commander of the 35th Communications Squadron at the Misawa Air Base in Misawa, Aomori, Japan until 2015. He worked as the Director of Staff for the Air Force Chief Information Officer until 2017. Afterwards, he worked as a cybersecurity policy analyst for the United States Department of Justice until 2018 and served as Deputy Group Commander for the 175th Cyberspace Operations Group of the Maryland Air National Guard at the Camp Fretterd Military Reservation in Reisterstown, Maryland until 2019.

Novotny first got involved with politics in 2017 by becoming the vice president of the Howard County Republican Club. Around the same time, he began working as a strategic legislative communication assistant for U.S. Representative Don Bacon, who represents Nebraska's 2nd congressional district. He ran in the 2018 Republican primary for state Senate in the 9th district, losing to incumbent Gail H. Bates. In 2019, he became a member of the Howard County Republican Central Committee. Following the resignation of Delegate Warren E. Miller on December 30, 2020, the Republican central committees of Howard and Carroll counties selected Novotny, who had Miller's support, to serve the rest of her term in the House of Delegates. He was appointed to fill the seat by Governor Larry Hogan on January 13, 2021.

Novotny is close to his brothers, Ryan (Colonel USAF Retired) and Ross (Entrepreneur), along with his half-brother Raymond and half-sister April. While serving, he and Ryan made the sport of long-distance running into a friendly competition. They both participated in the 2013 Boston Marathon and were present during the Boston Marathon bombing. Both brothers were unharmed in the attack. Novotny is married and has one child.

== In the legislature ==
Novotny was sworn into the Maryland House of Delegates on January 13, 2021. He was a member of the Appropriations Committee.

In January 2022, Novotny announced another run for state Senate in the 9th district Republican primary for the seat now held by Democrat Katie Fry Hester rather than seek election to his current appointed seat. He was defeated by Hester in the general election on November 8, 2022.

== Political positions ==
=== COVID-19 pandemic ===
In February 2022, Novotny attended a rally outside of a meeting for the Howard County Board of Education to call for an end to mask mandates in schools. At the rally, he said he supported parents who want their kids to wear a mask, but wanted parents to have the option to choose whether to do so.

=== Elections ===
In May 2021, Novotny and Delegate Haven Shoemaker wrote a letter to Westminster city representatives that questioned the integrity of the city's municipal election results. City officials responded to the letter by dismissing their concerns, saying that they had no merit.

Novotny introduced legislation during the 2022 legislative session that would give Marylands the ability to recall state and local officials. The bill received an unfavorable report from the Ways and Means Committee by a vote of 15-7.

=== Government ===
Novotny introduced legislation in the 2021 legislative session that would remove the voting rights of student school board members if their vote was a "deciding vote" on a motion. The bill received an unfavorable report from the Ways and Means committee in a 14-7 vote, killing the bill.

=== Policing ===
Novotny opposed a bill that would reduce school resource officers from schools, reallocating their funding towards mental health and counseling programs at schools, arguing that school resource officers should stay in schools and to reform when there are issues.

== Electoral history ==
Maryland Senate District 9 Republican Primary Election, 2018
| Party | Candidate | Votes | % |
|---|---|---|---|
| Republican | Gail H. Bates | 4,222 | 53.9% |
| Republican | Reid J. Novotny | 3,605 | 46.1% |
