= Chao Wu (politician) =

American politician

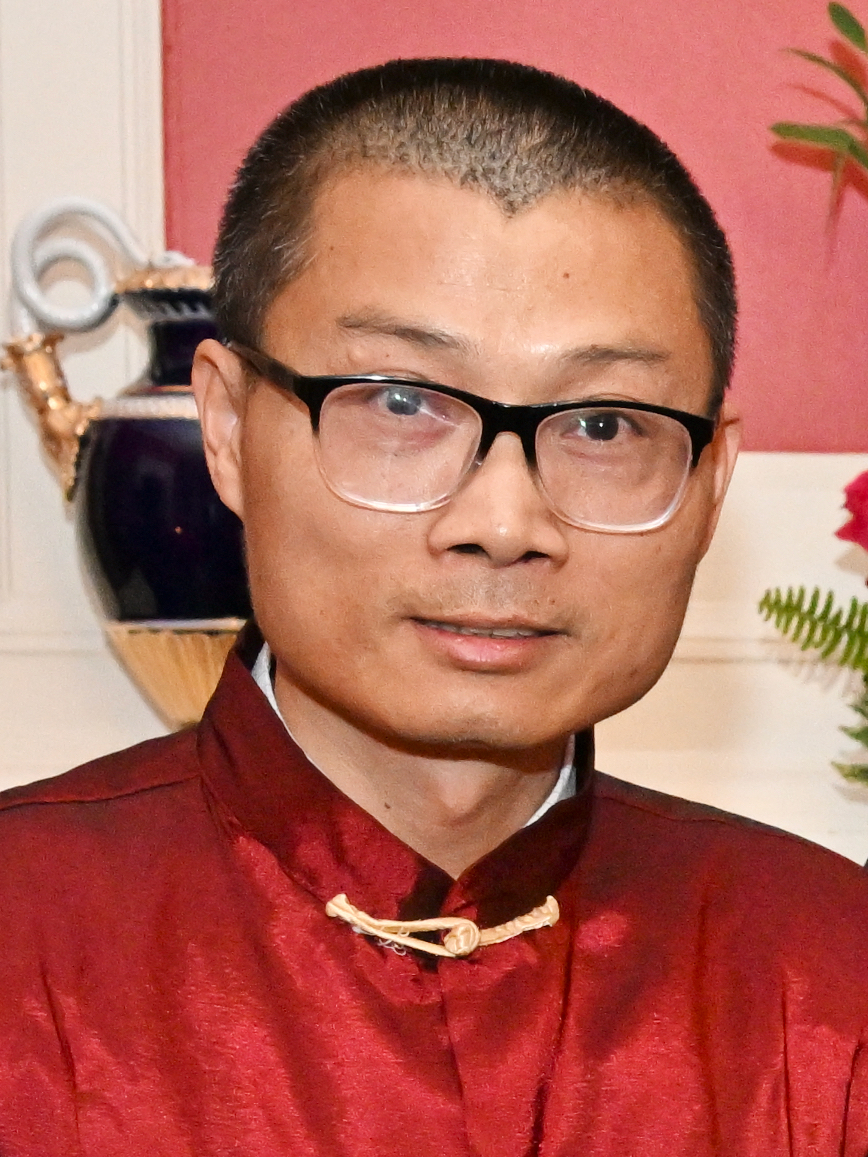
- Wu in 2023

Member of the Maryland House of Delegates from the 9A district
- Incumbent
- Assumed office January 11, 2023 Serving with Natalie Ziegler
- Preceded by: Trent Kittleman

Member of the Howard County Board of Education at-large
- In office December 3, 2018 – December 5, 2022
- Preceded by: Bess Altwerger; Sandra French; Christine O'Connor; Cynthia Vaillancourt
- Succeeded by: Jacky McCoy; Linfeng Chen

Personal details
- Born: 1977 (age 48–49) Yingshan County, Hubei, China
- Citizenship: China; United States (since 2016)
- Party: Democratic
- Children: 2
- Education: University of Science and Technology of China (BE); National University of Singapore (ME); University of Maryland, College Park (PhD)
- Profession: Engineer, data scientist
- Website: Campaign website

Chao Wu (born 1977) is an American politician who has served as a member of the Maryland House of Delegates since 2023, representing District 9A in Howard and Montgomery counties. A member of the Democratic Party, he was previously a member of the Howard County Board of Education from 2018 to 2022.

== Early life and education ==
Wu was born in 1977 in Yingshan County, Hubei, China. He attended the University of Science and Technology of China, where he earned a Bachelor of Engineering degree in 2001; the National University of Singapore, where he earned a master degree in electrical and computer engineering in 2003. Wu came to Maryland in 2003 to attend the University of Maryland, College Park, where he received a Doctor of Philosophy degree in electrical and computer engineering in 2009. While at the University of Maryland, Wu served as president of the local Chinese Students and Scholars Association (CSSA) chapter. As CSSA president, Wu stated that he helped other Chinese graduate students find places to live and learn to how pay tuition and register for classes. He also campaigned against Tibetan independence and perceived biased content in The Diamondback towards the 2008 Summer Olympics being held in Beijing.

== Career ==
After graduating, Wu served as an Oak Ridge Institute for Science and Education Fellow for the Food and Drug Administration from 2009 to 2010, afterwards working as a senior electrical engineer for defense contractor Maryland Aerospace until 2011. He also worked as an aviation software engineer for Garmin from April to June 2011. Wu became a U.S. citizen in 2016.

=== Political involvement ===
Wu represented the River Hill community of Columbia, Maryland on the Columbia Association's board of directors until 2018, and served as a board member of the River Hill Village Association from 2012 to 2018. During this time, Wu was instrumental in initiating Columbia's sister city agreement with Liyang. In November 2017, Wu filed to run for the Howard County Board of Education. He won the nonpartisan primary election on June 27, 2018, and later won election to the board on November 6. In December 2020, Wu was elected as the Board of Education's chairperson, becoming the first Asian American to lead the board. In October 2021, Wu was named to serve as a board member to the Maryland Association of Boards of Education.

=== Maryland House of Delegates ===
In February 2022 Wu filed to run for the Maryland House of Delegates. He won the Democratic primary on July 19, 2022, and later won the general election on November 8, narrowly defeating incumbent state delegate Trent Kittleman with Natalie Ziegler.

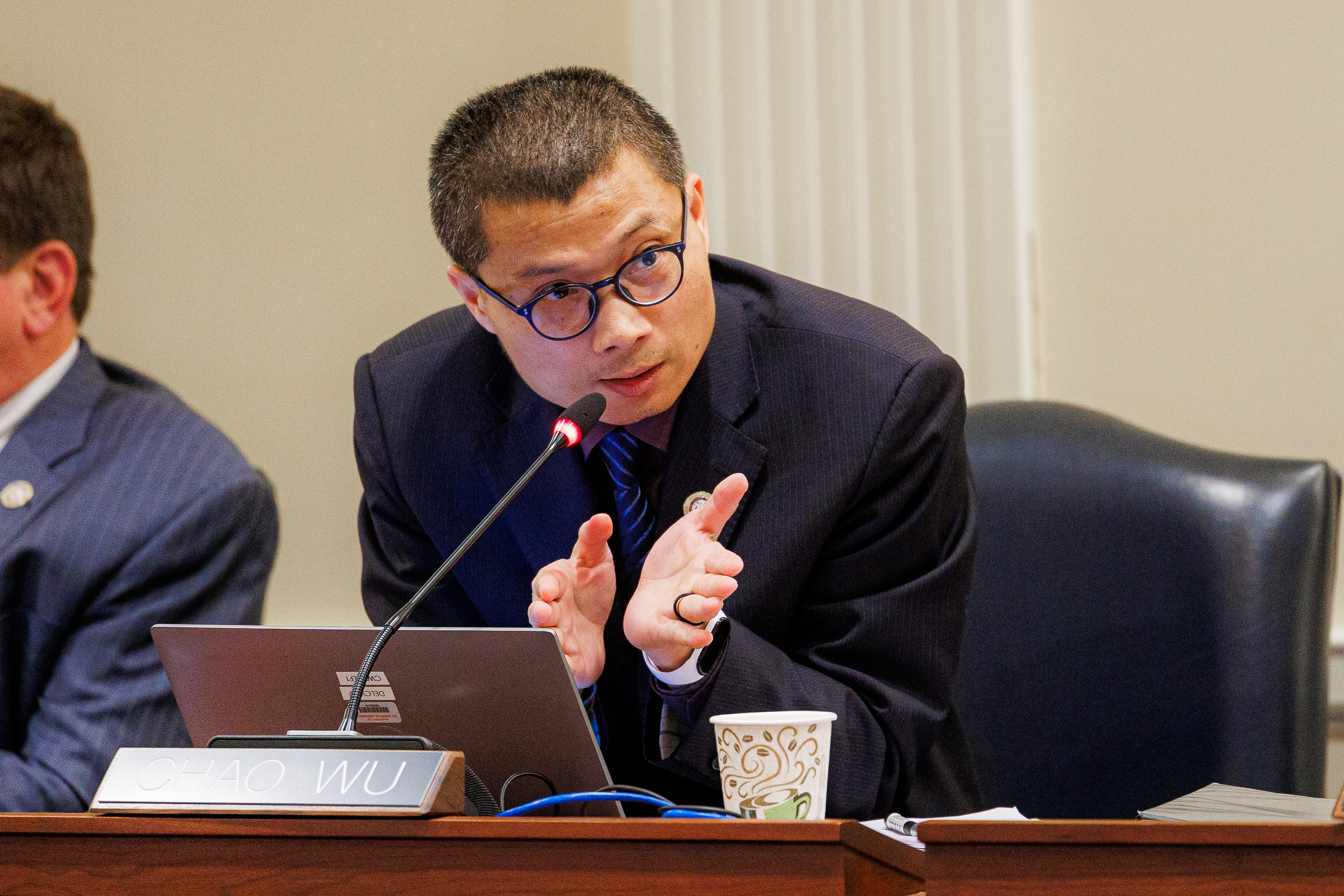
Wu in the Ways and Means Committee, 2024

Wu was sworn into the Maryland House of Delegates on January 11, 2023. During his tenure, he has maintained a relatively low profile and been described by colleagues as a moderate. He has served in the House Ways and Means Committee since 2023, and as a deputy majority whip since 2026.

== Political positions ==
In June 2021, Wu voted against ending the school system's school resource officer program. The school board voted 5–3 to continue the program.

During the 2025 legislative session, Wu introduced a bill that would require generative AI developers to publish specific information detailing data and datasets used to train their AI products.

== Personal life ==
Wu lives in Clarksville, Maryland. He is a father of two children, a son and a daughter.

== Electoral history ==
Howard County Board of Education primary election, 2018
| Candidate | Votes | % |
|---|---|---|
| Vicky Cutroneo | 20,602 | 14.1 |
| Bob Glascock | 17,503 | 12.0 |
| Robert Wayne Miller | 16,469 | 11.3 |
| Chao Wu | 15,600 | 10.7 |
| Jen Mallo | 13,545 | 9.3 |
| Sabina Taj | 13,326 | 9.2 |
| Anita Pandey | 10,041 | 6.9 |
| Danny Mackey | 9,980 | 6.9 |
| Carleen Pena | 8,301 | 5.7 |
| Saif Rehman | 7,582 | 5.2 |
| Mavourene Robinson | 5,828 | 4.0 |
| Timothy Hodgson Hamilton | 3,691 | 2.5 |
| Christopher Michael Hilfiger | 3,171 | 2.2 |

Howard County Board of Education general election, 2018
| Candidate | Votes | % |
|---|---|---|
| Vicky Cutroneo | 58,426 | 15.1 |
| Chao Wu | 54,254 | 14.1 |
| Jen Mallo | 53,766 | 13.9 |
| Sabina Taj | 51,842 | 13.4 |
| Bob Glascock | 46,929 | 12.2 |
| Robert Wayne Miller | 43,847 | 11.4 |
| Anita Pandey | 38,109 | 9.9 |
| Danny Mackey | 36,923 | 9.6 |
| Write-in | 1,685 | 0.4 |

Maryland House of Delegates District 9A Democratic primary election, 2022
| Party | Candidate | Votes | % |
|---|---|---|---|
| Democratic | Natalie Ziegler | 5,308 | 41.8 |
| Democratic | Chao Wu | 3,942 | 31.0 |
| Democratic | Steven M. Bolen | 3,448 | 27.2 |

Maryland House of Delegates District 9A general election, 2022
| Party | Candidate | Votes | % |
|---|---|---|---|
| Democratic | Natalie Ziegler | 17,767 | 26.68 |
| Democratic | Chao Wu | 17,486 | 26.43 |
| Republican | Trent Kittleman (incumbent) | 17,373 | 26.26 |
| Republican | Jianning Zeng | 13,609 | 20.56 |
| Write-in | | 44 | 0.07 |
