= Frank S. Turner =

American politician (1947–2025)

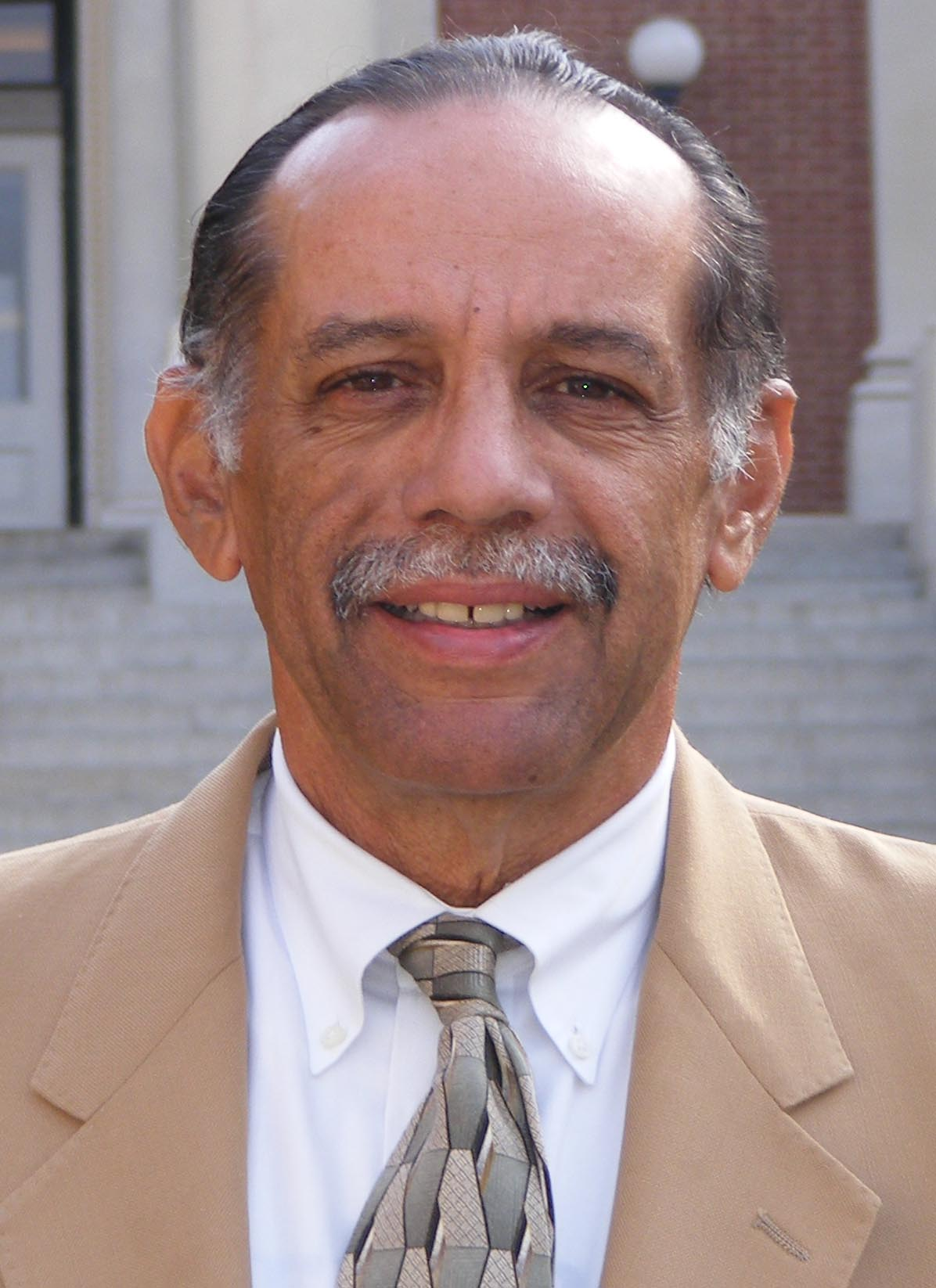

Member of the Maryland House of Delegates from District 13
- In office January 11, 1995 – January 9, 2019
- Preceded by: Martin G. Madden, Virginia M. Thomas
- Succeeded by: Jennifer R. Terrasa

Personal details
- Born: July 6, 1947 Mount Pleasant, New York, U.S.
- Died: February 14, 2025 (aged 77) Columbia, Maryland, U.S.
- Party: Democratic
- Spouse: Kimberlee
- Children: 4
- Education: North Carolina Central University (BA, JD)
- Occupation: Educator

Frank Seaton Turner (July 6, 1947 – February 14, 2025) was an American politician who represented District 13 in the Maryland House of Delegates and was a onetime chairman of the Howard County Delegation.

== In the legislature ==
Turner was a member of House of Delegates from January 11, 1995, to January 9, 2019, and a member of the Ways and Means Committee (chair, gambling subcommittee), 2007–2019. Turner was the first African-American elected to the Maryland General Assembly from Howard County and was a member of the Legislative Black Caucus of Maryland.

=== Legislative notes ===
- Voted for legalized gambling in Maryland (HB359)
- Voted to increase taxes in 2007 (HB2)
- Voted in favor of in-state tuition for illegal immigrants in 2007 (HB6)

== Personal life and death ==
In 2014, the ballfields at Blandair regional park were named after Turner for securing Program Open Space funding for the project.

Turner died in Columbia, Maryland on February 14, 2025, at the age of 77. His death was announced by state delegate Vanessa Atterbeary on the floor of the Maryland House of Delegates.

== Election results ==
=== General election results, 2006 ===
- 2006 Race for Maryland House of Delegates – 13th District

Voters to choose three:

Name	Votes	Percent	Outcome
Guy Guzzone, Democratic	26,891	22.3%	Won
Shane E. Pendergrass, Democratic	26,633	22.1%	Won
Frank S. Turner, Democratic	24,437	20.3%	Won
Mary Beth Tung, Republican	15,216	12.6%	Lost
Rick Bowers, Republican	13,665	11.4%	Lost
Loretta Gaffney, Republican	13,466	11.2%	Lost
Other write-ins	84	0.1%	Lost
