= Natalie Ziegler =

American politician (born 1955)

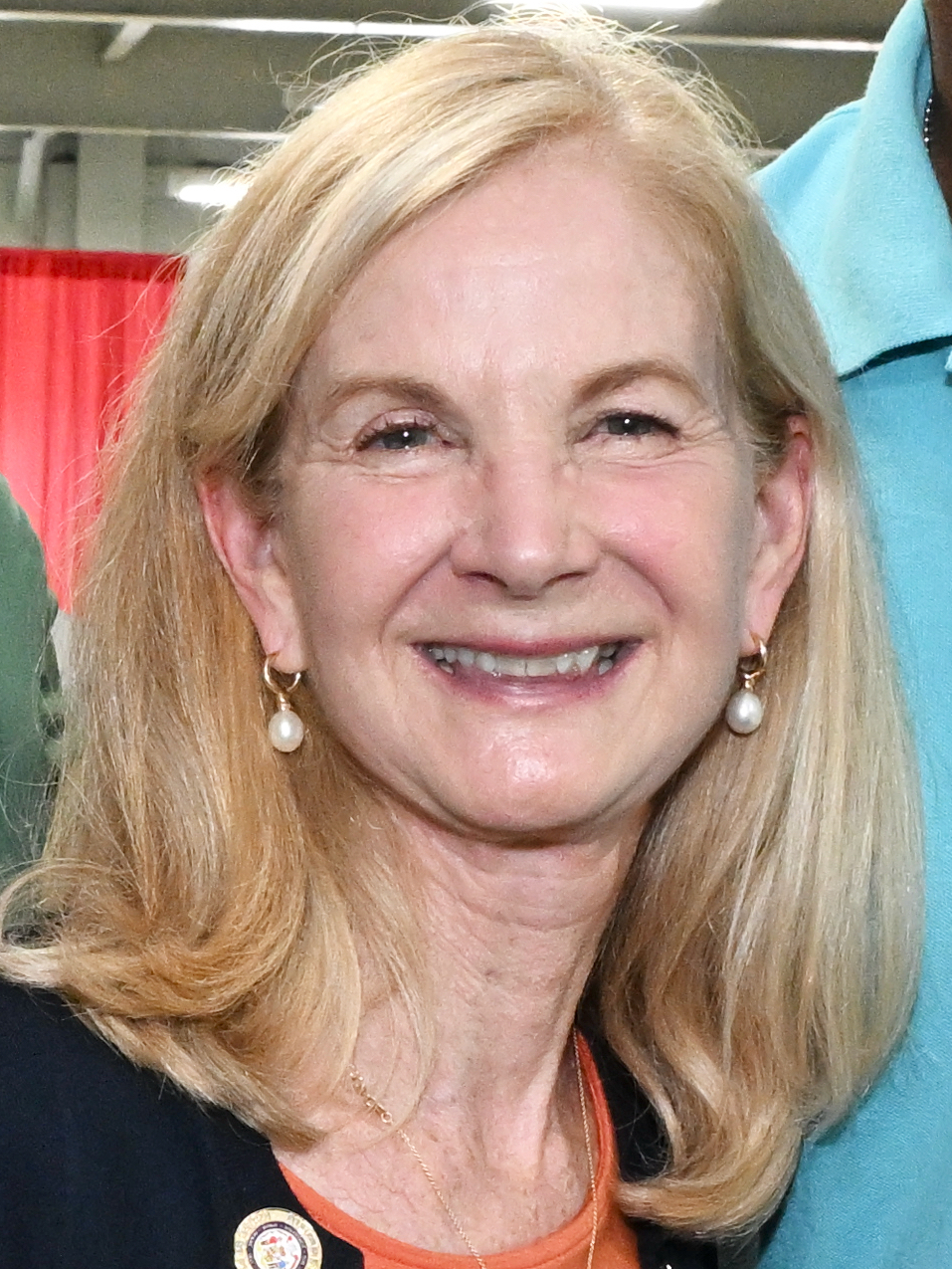

Member of the Maryland House of Delegates from the 9A district
- Incumbent
- Assumed office January 11, 2023 Serving with Chao Wu
- Preceded by: Reid Novotny

Personal details
- Born: September 5, 1955 (age 71) New York, New York, U.S.
- Party: Democratic
- Spouse: John Zirschky
- Children: 2
- Occupation: Farmer
- Website: Campaign website

Natalie Carroll Ziegler (born September 5, 1955) is an American politician and farmer. She is a member of the Maryland House of Delegates for District 9A in Howard and Montgomery counties.

== Background ==
Born in 1955 to mother Mary Carter Carroll and father John C. Ziegler, Ziegler was raised in New York City and Boston. She graduated from Abbot Academy in 1972 and Oberlin College in 1977, receiving a bachelor's degree with high honors in psychology, and later attended the Johns Hopkins University School of Advanced International Studies, where she earned a master's degree in economics and American foreign policy in 1986. She worked as a journalist and a guest booker for CNN, and founded a jewelry manufacturing company with her husband in 2001.

Ziegler is a fifth-generation descendant of Charles Carroll of Carrollton, a former U.S. Senator from Maryland and a signer of the Declaration of Independence. She owns Carroll Mill Farm, a feed grain operation in Ellicott City, Maryland.

In 2018, Ziegler ran for the Maryland House of Delegates in District 9A, challenging incumbent Republican state delegates Trent Kittleman and Warren E. Miller. She won the Democratic primary on June 26, 2018, but was defeated by Kittleman and Miller in the general election on November 6. Shortly after her loss, county executive-elect Calvin Ball III named Ziegler to serve on the county's public works subcommittee transition team.

In January 2020, Ziegler was appointed to the Howard Community College Board of Trustees. She was reappointed to the board in October 2021.

In November 2021, Ziegler filed to run for state delegate in District 9A, seeking to succeed outgoing state delegate Reid Novotny, who ran unsuccessfully for Maryland Senate. She won a tight general election on November 8, 2022, coming in first.

== In the legislature ==
Ziegler was sworn into the Maryland House of Delegates on January 11, 2023. She is a member of the House Environment and Transportation Committee. In January 2026, House Speaker Joseline Peña-Melnyk named Ziegler as the co-chair of the newly-created Rural Caucus, alongside Republican Jefferson L. Ghrist.

== Political positions ==
In September 2016, Ziegler supported and testified for a proposal to expand solar development on Howard County farmland.

During the 2023 legislative session, Ziegler pushed back against a bill that would ban foreign governments from buying farmland in Maryland, worrying that the bill would "demonize people unfairly".

In February 2026, Ziegler introduced a bill that would establish the Rural Maryland Capacity Building Fund and the Rural Readiness Program, which would provide assistance to individuals and small businesses in rural communities.

== Personal life ==
Ziegler lives in Ellicott City with her husband, John Zirschky. Together, they have two children.

== Electoral history ==
Maryland House of Delegates District 9A Democratic Primary Election, 2018
Party	Candidate	Votes	%
Democratic	Natalie Ziegler	4,860	51.7
Democratic	Steven M. Bolen	2,848	30.3
Democratic	Michael David Gross	1,696	18.0

Maryland House of Delegates District 9A General Election, 2018
Party	Candidate	Votes	%
Republican	Trent Kittleman (incumbent)	24,531	30.6
Republican	Warren E. Miller (incumbent)	19,563	24.4
Democratic	Natalie Ziegler	18,891	23.6
Democratic	Steven M. Bolen	17,019	21.3
Write-in		56	0.1

Maryland House of Delegates District 9A Democratic Primary Election, 2022
Party	Candidate	Votes	%
Democratic	Natalie Ziegler	5,308	41.8
Democratic	Chao Wu	3,942	31.0
Democratic	Steven M. Bolen	3,448	27.2

Maryland House of Delegates District 9A General Election, 2022
Party	Candidate	Votes	%
Democratic	Natalie Ziegler	17,767	26.68
Democratic	Chao Wu	17,486	26.43
Republican	Trent Kittleman (incumbent)	17,373	26.26
Republican	Jianning Zeng	13,609	20.56
Write-in		44	0.07
