= Gabriel Moreno (politician) =

American politician (born 1984)

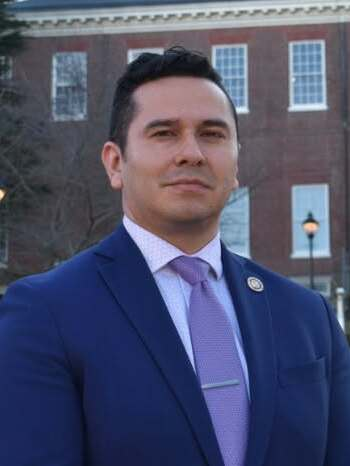
- Moreno in 2026

Member of the Maryland House of Delegates from the 13th district
- Incumbent
- Assumed office January 13, 2026 Serving with Jennifer R. Terrasa and Pam Guzzone
- Appointed by: Wes Moore
- Preceded by: Vanessa Atterbeary

Personal details
- Born: October 1, 1984 (age 41) El Paso, Texas, U.S.
- Party: Democratic
- Spouse: Jessica Terrazas-Moreno
- Children: 2
- Education: Texas A&M University (BA); University of Texas at El Paso (BA); Massachusetts School of Law (JD)

Gabriel Maximilian Moreno (born October 1, 1984) is an American politician, nonprofit executive, and attorney who has served as a member of the Maryland House of Delegates from the 13th district since 2026. He is a member of the Democratic Party.

== Early life and education ==
Moreno was born and raised in El Paso, Texas, on October 1, 1984, to immigrant parents from Mexico. He graduated from Irvin High School in 2003, afterwards attending Texas A&M University, where he was a member of Lambda Chi Alpha and earned a Bachelor of Arts degree in philosophy; the University of Texas at El Paso, where he graduated with a Bachelor of Arts in organizational and corporate communication; and the Massachusetts School of Law, where he earned a Juris Doctor degree.

== Career ==
After graduating from Texas A&M, Moreno worked as a floating substitute teacher before leaving Texas to attend MSLAW. After his wife got a job in human resources at the University of Maryland, College Park, they moved to Baltimore and eventually settled in Elkridge. Moreno worked at various law firms before becoming a national senior attorney on the Family Separation Response Team at Kids in Need of Defense until 2023. In July 2023, he became the CEO of Luminus, a nonprofit that provides services to immigrants from over 90 countries. From 2021 to 2023, he served on the steering committee for the family separation response established under the "Ms. L. settlement agreement". Moreno stepped down from Luminus in January 2026, after being appointed to the Maryland House of Delegates.

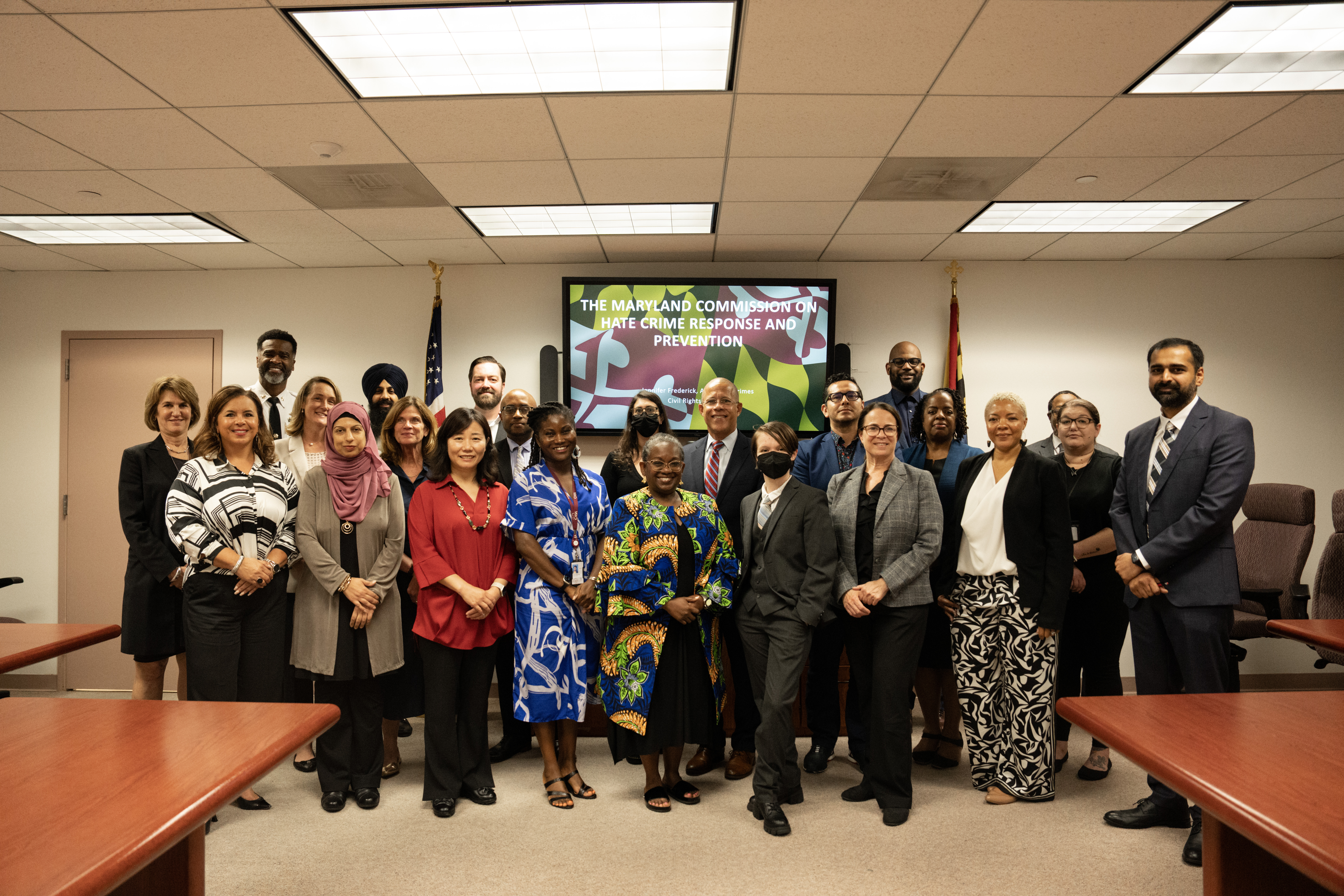
Moreno and other members of the Maryland Commission on Hate Crime Response and Prevention, 2024

Moreno was elected to the Howard County Democratic Central Committee in 2018 and reelected in 2022. He also served as an alternate delegate to the 2020 Democratic National Convention and at-large delegate to the 2024 Democratic National Convention. In August 2024, Moreno was appointed to the Maryland Commission on Hate Crime Response and Prevention. He was also a member of the Governor's Commission on Hispanic and Latin American Community Affairs.

== Maryland House of Delegates ==
In July 2025, Moreno filed to run for the Maryland House of Delegates in District 13, seeking to succeed Jen Terrasa, who retired to run for clerk of the Howard County circut court. After being appointed to the House of Delegates, Moreno was added to a slate alongside other District 13 incumbents and Amy Brooks.

In December 2025, after state delegate Vanessa Atterbeary announced that she would resign to focus on her campaign for Howard County Executive, he applied to serve the remainder of Atterbeary's term. Moreno was nominated to the seat by the Howard County Democratic Central Committee on January 7, 2026. Governor Wes Moore appointed Moreno to the seat on January 12, 2026, and he was sworn in the next day. Moreno is a member of the Judiciary Committee.

== Political positions ==
During the 2026 legislative session, Moreno introduced a bill that would prohibit the Maryland Department of Juvenile Services from using of seclusion rooms and restraints as a form of punishment.

== Personal life ==
Moreno is married to his wife, Jessica. Together, they have two children and live in Columbia, Maryland.
