= Jennifer R. Terrasa =

American politician (born 1969)

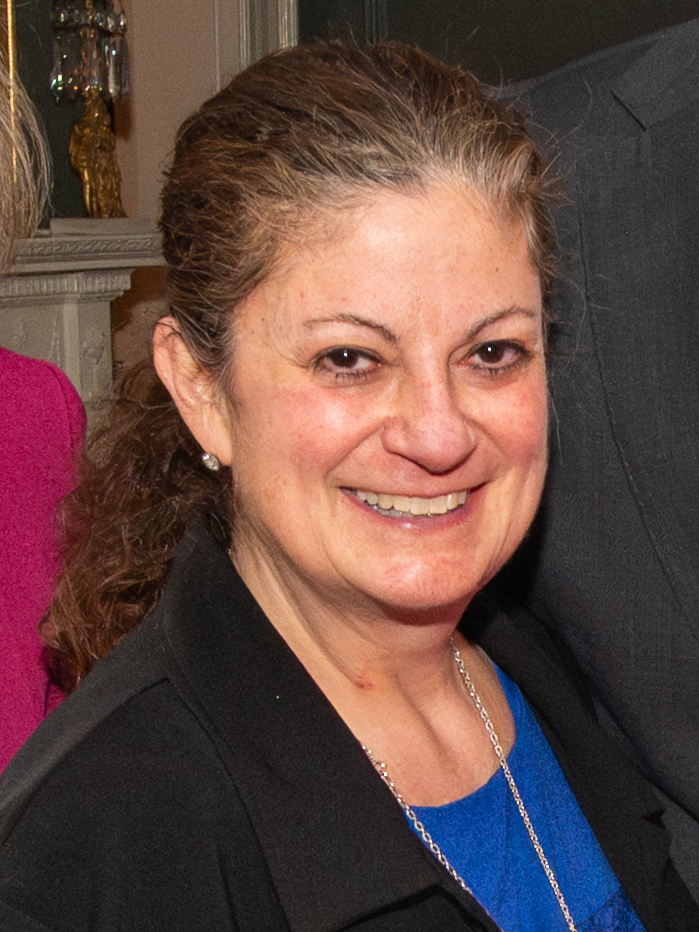
- Terrasa in 2026

Clerk-elect of the Howard County Circuit Court
- Assuming office December 7, 2026
- Succeeding: Wayne A. Robey

Member of the Maryland House of Delegates from the 13th district
- Incumbent
- Assumed office January 9, 2019 Serving with Gabriel Moreno and Pam Guzzone
- Preceded by: Frank S. Turner

Member of the Howard County Council from the 3rd district
- In office December 4, 2006 – December 3, 2018
- Preceded by: Guy Guzzone
- Succeeded by: Christiana Rigby

Personal details
- Born: June 6, 1969 (age 57) New York, New York, U.S.
- Party: Democratic
- Children: 3
- Education: University of Maryland at College Park (BA); University of Baltimore School of Law (JD)

Jennifer R. Terrasa (born June 6, 1969) is an American politician who is the clerk-elect of the Howard County Circuit Court. A member of the Democratic Party, she has served as a member of the Maryland House of Delegates representing the 13th district since 2019. She was previously a member of the Howard County Council from 2006 to 2018.

== Early life and career ==
Terrasa was born on June 6, 1969, in New York City. Her family moved to Columbia, Maryland when she was a toddler, where she graduated from Oakland Mills High School. She attended the University of Maryland at College Park in College Park, Maryland, where she earned a B.A. degree in sociology in 1992, and the University of Baltimore School of Law, where she earned a J.D. degree in law review in 1997. She was admitted to the Maryland Bar in the same year.

After graduating, she served as a law clerk to Maryland Court of Appeals judge Howard S. Chasanow until 1998 and Howard County Circuit Court judge Lenore R. Gelfman until 1999. From 2000 to 2006, Terrasa served as a family law hotline attorney for the Women's Law Center of Maryland.

== Howard County Council ==
In 1994, Terrasa moved to the Kings Contrivance neighborhood of Columbia. She was appointed to the neighborhood's Village Board in December 2001, succeeding Victoria Dieringer, who resigned for personal reasons. She resigned from the Village Board in December 2005 to run for the Howard County Council, seeking to succeed councilmember Guy Guzzone, who announced plans to run for the Maryland House of Delegates. She won the general election with 62.0 percent of the vote.

Terrasa was a national delegate for Barack Obama at the 2008 Democratic National Convention. Before the 2008 Maryland Democratic presidential primary, Terrasa canvassed alongside county council member Calvin Ball III in Oakland Mills for Obama.

Terrasa faced a tough re-election campaign in 2010, facing off against Republican moderate Dennis R. Schrader in the general election. She defeated Schrader in the general election, receiving 67.1 percent of the vote.

In January 2018, Terrasa declared her candidacy for the Maryland House of Delegates, seeking to succeed delegate Frank Turner. who announced plans to retire at the end of his term. Turner endorsed Terrasa's campaign in January 2018. She won the Democratic primary with 27.7 percent of the vote, coming in third out of a field of four Democrats. She won the general election with 27.1 percent of the vote, defeating Republican Chris Yates.

== In the legislature ==
Terrasa was sworn into the Maryland House of Delegates on January 9, 2019. She served on the Appropriations Committee during the 2019 legislative session, afterwards serving on the Environment and Transportation Committee. Terrasa is also a member of the Maryland Legislative Latino Caucus, the Maryland Legislative Transit Caucus, and the Women Legislators of Maryland. In February 2022, House Speaker Adrienne A. Jones assigned Terrasa and Vaughn Stewart to lead the newly created Progressive Policy Forum within the House Democratic Caucus.

Terrasa was reelected in 2022. In December 2025, Terrasa announced that she would not seek re-election to the House of Delegates, opting instead to run for clerk of the Howard County Circuit Court in 2026. She is running unopposed.

== Political positions ==
=== Elections ===
Terrasa, alongside Howard County Council chairman Jon Weinstein, introduced legislation in February 2016 that would create a public financing system for candidates who swear off large donations. The legislation was reintroduced in 2017.

=== Environment ===
In March 2021, Terrasa, alongside Delegates Lorig Charkoudian, Dana Stein, and Vaughn Stewart, joined the Leaders for Climate Accountability, a national work of public officials who support holding corporate polluters accountable for their contributions to the climate crisis. She introduced legislation in the 2021 legislative session that would allow the Attorney General of Maryland to sue companies that have contributed to the climate crisis through fraud or deception. The bill was reintroduced in the 2022 legislative session.

=== Healthcare ===
Terrasa supports universal health care and Medicare for All. She co-sponsored the Healthy Maryland Act of 2019, which would institute Medicare-for-all, single-payer healthcare legislation in Maryland.

=== Housing ===
In October 2015, Terrasa introduced legislation that would require 15 percent of all new housing units developed in downtown Columbia to be affordable to families earning between 40 and 80 percent of the county's median income.

In October 2018, Terrasa introduced a bill that would require new single-family houses and apartments to have infrastructure to support charging stations for electric vehicles.

=== Immigration ===
Following the election of President-elect Donald Trump, Terrasa introduced legislation that would designate Howard County a sanctuary jurisdiction.

=== Marijuana ===
Terrasa supports the legalization and regulation of recreational marijuana.

=== Redistricting ===
Terrasa supports using an independent redistricting commission to draw Maryland's legislative and congressional district maps.

=== Taxes ===
In July 2018, Terrasa introduced legislation that would repeal Howard County's tax on mobile home rental sites. The County Council voted to kill the bill in September 2018.

== Electoral history ==
Kings Contrivance Village Board Election, 2004
Candidate	Votes	%
Jennifer Terrasa	136	31.8%
Heidi Gaasch	123	28.7%
Buna Cumbie	108	25.2%
Heather Ryan	61	14.3%

Howard County Council Councilmanic District 3 General Election, 2006
Party	Candidate	Votes	%
Democratic	Jennifer Terrasa	9,846	62.0%
Republican	Donna Thewes	6,037	38.0%
Other Write-Ins	Other Write-Ins	10	0.1%

Howard County Council Councilmanic District 3 Democratic Primary Election, 2010
Party	Candidate	Votes	%
Democratic	Jennifer Terrasa	3,022	100.0%

Howard County Council Councilmanic District 3 General Election, 2010
Party	Candidate	Votes	%
Democratic	Jennifer Terrasa	11,071	67.1%
Democratic	Dennis R. Schrader	5,413	32.8%
Other Write-Ins	Other Write-Ins	13	0.1%

Howard County Council Councilmanic District 3 Democratic Primary Election, 2014
Party	Candidate	Votes	%
Democratic	Jennifer Terrasa	3,947	100.0%

Howard County Council Councilmanic District 3 General Election, 2014
Party	Candidate	Votes	%
Democratic	Jennifer Terrasa	14,107	97.8%
Other Write-Ins	Other Write-Ins	324	2.2%

Maryland House of Delegates District 13 Democratic Primary Election, 2018
Party	Candidate	Votes	%
Democratic	Vanessa Atterbeary	10,856	32.7%
Democratic	Shane Pendergrass	10,020	30.2%
Democratic	Jen Terrasa	9,169	27.7%
Democratic	Larry Pretlow, II	3,110	9.4%

Maryland House of Delegates District 13 General Election, 2018
Party	Candidate	Votes	%
Democratic	Vanessa Atterbeary	39,470	30.7%
Democratic	Shane Pendergrass	36,519	28.4%
Democratic	Jen Terrasa	34,921	27.1%
Republican	Chris Yates	17,258	13.4%
Other Write-Ins	Other Write-Ins	513	0.4%

Maryland House of Delegates District 13 Democratic Primary Election, 2022
Party	Candidate	Votes	%
Democratic	Vanessa Atterbeary (incumbent)	11,663	29.9
Democratic	Jennifer R. Terrasa (incumbent)	9,249	23.7
Democratic	Pam Lanman Guzzone	7,760	19.9
Democratic	Amy R. Brooks	6,756	17.3
Democratic	Becca Niburg	3,561	9.1

Maryland House of Delegates District 13 General Election, 2022
Party	Candidate	Votes	%
Democratic	Vanessa Atterbeary (incumbent)	33,045	27.85%
Democratic	Jennifer R. Terrasa (incumbent)	31,259	26.35%
Democratic	Pam Lanman Guzzone	31,128	26.24%
Republican	Chris Yates	11,874	10.01%
Republican	Padraic Walsh	10,792	9.10%
Write-in		539	0.45%
