= Maryland Legislative District 13 =

American legislative district

Maryland's legislative district 13
- Represents part of Howard County
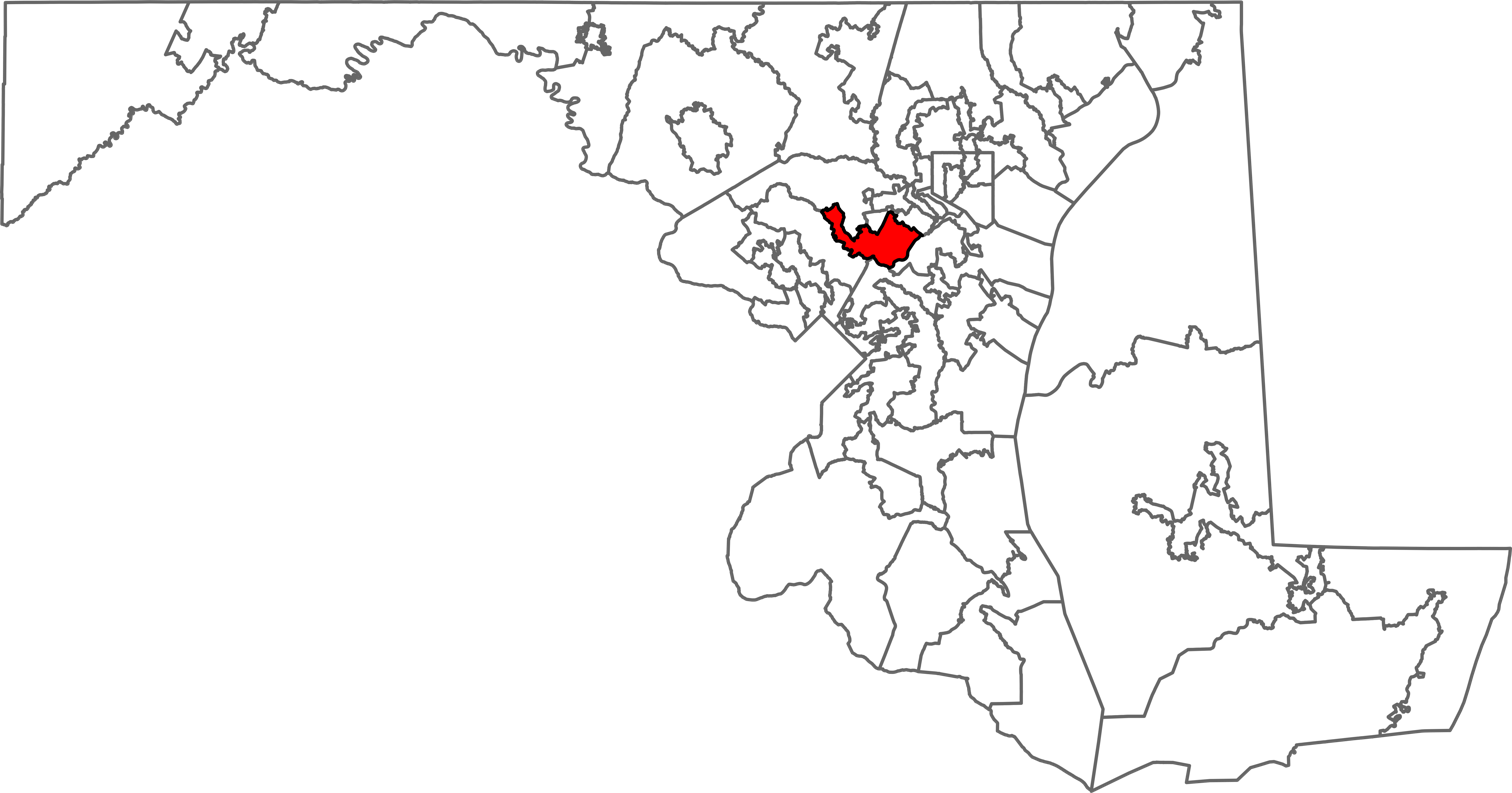
- Senator: Guy J. Guzzone (D)
- Delegate(s): Gabriel M. Moreno (D); Pam Guzzone (D); Jennifer R. Terrasa (D)
- Registration: 56.6% Democratic; 18.8% Republican; 23.1% unaffiliated
- Demographics: 41.0% White; 25.8% Black/African American; 0.5% Native American; 17.8% Asian; 0.0% Hawaiian/Pacific Islander; 5.9% Other race; 9.1% Two or more races; 11.2% Hispanic
- Population (2020): 146,321
- Voting-age population: 109,653
- Registered voters: 94,769

Maryland Legislative District 13 is one of 47 districts in the state for the Maryland General Assembly. It covers part of Howard County. The district is represented by three delegates in the Maryland House of Delegates.

== Demographic characteristics ==
As of the 2020 United States census, the district had a population of 146,321, of whom 109,653 (74.9%) were of voting age. The racial makeup of the district was 59,988 (41.0%) White, 37,765 (25.8%) African American, 663 (0.5%) Native American, 26,004 (17.8%) Asian, 58 (0.0%) Pacific Islander, 8,564 (5.9%) from some other race, and 13,265 (9.1%) from two or more races. Hispanic or Latino of any race were 16,422 (11.2%) of the population.

The district had 94,769 registered voters as of October 17, 2020, of whom 21,901 (23.1%) were registered as unaffiliated, 17,775 (18.8%) were registered as Republicans, 53,677 (56.6%) were registered as Democrats, and 864 (0.9%) were registered to other parties.

== Political representation ==
The district is represented for the 2023–2027 legislative term in the State Senate by Guy J. Guzzone (D) and in the House of Delegates by Gabriel M. Moreno (D), Pam Guzzone (D) and Jennifer R. Terrasa (D).

== Election history ==
=== Multi-member Senate district (1967–1975) ===
District A			District B			District C			District D			District E			District F			District G		
Senator	Party	Years	Senator	Party	Years	Senator	Party	Years	Senator	Party	Years	Senator	Party	Years	Senator	Party	Years	Senator	Party	Years
Harry J. Connolly Sr.	Dem.	January 18, 1967 – January 13, 1971	Melvin A. Steinberg	Dem.	January 18, 1967 – January 8, 1975	Jervis S. Finney	Rep.	January 18, 1967 – January 8, 1975	John J. Bishop Jr.	Rep.	January 18, 1967 – January 8, 1975	James A. Pine	Dem.	January 18, 1967 – January 8, 1975	Norman R. Stone Jr.	Dem.	January 18, 1967 – January 8, 1975	Roy N. Staten	Dem.	January 18, 1967 – January 8, 1975
John C. Coolahan	Dem.	January 13, 1971 – January 8, 1975	Melvin A. Steinberg	Dem.	January 18, 1967 – January 8, 1975	Jervis S. Finney	Rep.	January 18, 1967 – January 8, 1975	John J. Bishop Jr.	Rep.	January 18, 1967 – January 8, 1975	James A. Pine	Dem.	January 18, 1967 – January 8, 1975	Norman R. Stone Jr.	Dem.	January 18, 1967 – January 8, 1975	Roy N. Staten	Dem.	January 18, 1967 – January 8, 1975

=== Single-member Senate district (1975–present) ===
Years	Senator	Party	Electoral history
January 8, 1975 – January 10, 1979	John C. Coolahan	Democratic	Redrawn from District 13-A and elected in 1974. Retired to run for Baltimore County Executive.
January 10, 1979 – January 12, 1983	Timothy R. Hickman	Democratic	Elected in 1978. Redistricted to the 12th district.
January 12, 1983 – January 11, 1995	Thomas M. Yeager	Democratic	Elected in 1982. Re-elected in 1986. Re-elected in 1990. Lost renomination.
January 11, 1995 – January 7, 2002	Martin G. Madden	Republican	Elected in 1994. Re-elected in 1998. Resigned.
January 9, 2002 – January 10, 2007	Sandra B. Schrader	Republican	Appointed to serve the remainder of Madden's term. Elected in 2002. Lost re-election.
January 10, 2007 – January 14, 2015	James N. Robey	Democratic	Elected in 2006. Re-elected in 2010. Retired.
January 14, 2015 – present	Guy Guzzone	Democratic	Elected in 2014. Re-elected in 2018. Re-elected in 2022. Re-elected in 2026.
