= Pam Guzzone =

American politician (born 1963)

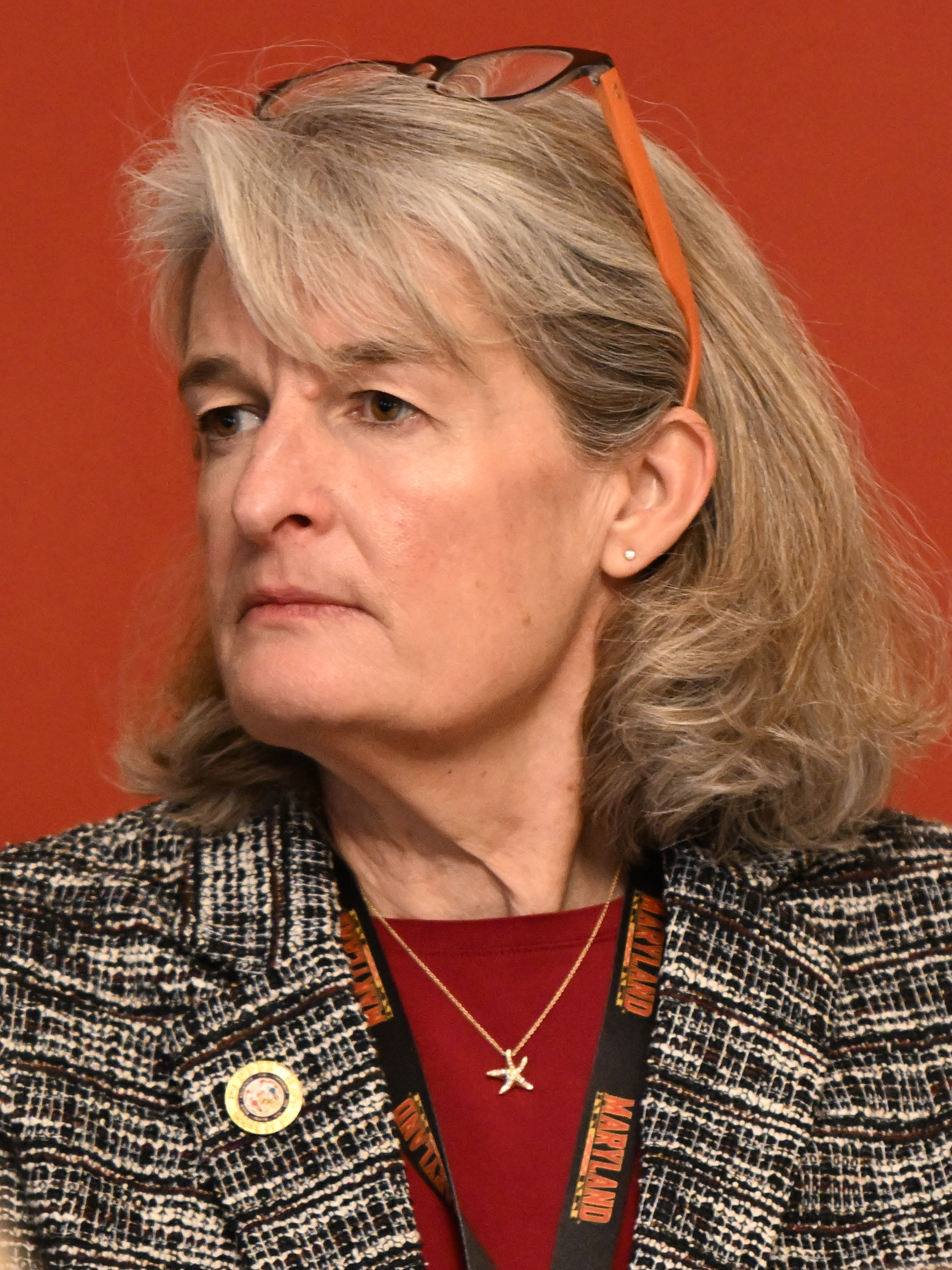
- Guzzone in 2023

Member of the Maryland House of Delegates from the 13th district
- Incumbent
- Assumed office January 11, 2023 Serving with Gabriel Moreno and Jen Terrasa
- Preceded by: Shane Pendergrass

Personal details
- Born: January 4, 1963 (age 63) Boston, Massachusetts, U.S.
- Party: Democratic
- Spouse: Guy Guzzone (divorced)
- Children: 3
- Education: Tufts University (BA); University of Maryland School of Public Policy (MPP)
- Occupation: Retired management professional

Pamela Lanman Guzzone (born January 4, 1963) is an American politician and management professional who is a member of the Maryland House of Delegates for District 13.

== Background ==
Guzzone graduated from Duxbury High School in 1981. She later attended Tufts University, where she received a Bachelor of Arts degree in English and political science in 1985, and the University of Maryland School of Public Policy, where she received a Masters of Public Policy degree in 1989.

Guzzone is a public management professional who worked for NASA's Goddard Space Flight Center until her retirement in 2019. She also previously worked as a community and civic activist, serving on her local parent–teacher association and working with the Domestic Violence Center of Howard County and other groups. Since her retirement, she has run a professional coaching and consulting firm.

In July 2004, Guzzone attended the Democratic National Convention as a national delegate pledged to U.S. Senator John Kerry. During the 2008 presidential primary elections, Guzzone supported former First Lady of the United States Hillary Clinton.

In December 2021, Guzzone filed to run for the Maryland House of Delegates in District 13, seeking to succeed retiring state delegate Shane Pendergrass. Before declaring her candidacy, she spoke to her ex-husband, Guy Guzzone (who currently represents the district in the Maryland Senate), who gave her advice on the prospect of running. She ran on a slate with Guzzone and incumbent state delegates Vanessa Atterbeary and Jen Terrasa during the primary election.

== In the legislature ==
Guzzone was sworn into the Maryland House of Delegates on January 11, 2023. She is a member of the House Health and Government Operations Committee.

== Electoral history ==
Maryland House of Delegates District 13 Democratic primary election, 2022
Party	Candidate	Votes	%
Democratic	Vanessa Atterbeary	11,663	29.9
Democratic	Jennifer R. Terrasa	9,249	23.7
Democratic	Pam Lanman Guzzone	7,760	19.9
Democratic	Amy R. Brooks	6,756	17.3
Democratic	Becca Niburg	3,561	9.1

Maryland House of Delegates District 13 election, 2022
Party	Candidate	Votes	%
Democratic	Vanessa Atterbeary	33,045	27.85
Democratic	Jennifer R. Terrasa	31,259	26.35
Democratic	Pam Lanman Guzzone	31,128	26.24
Republican	Chris Yates	11,874	10.01
Republican	Padraic Walsh	10,792	9.10
Write-in		539	0.45
