= Guy Guzzone =

American politician (born 1964)

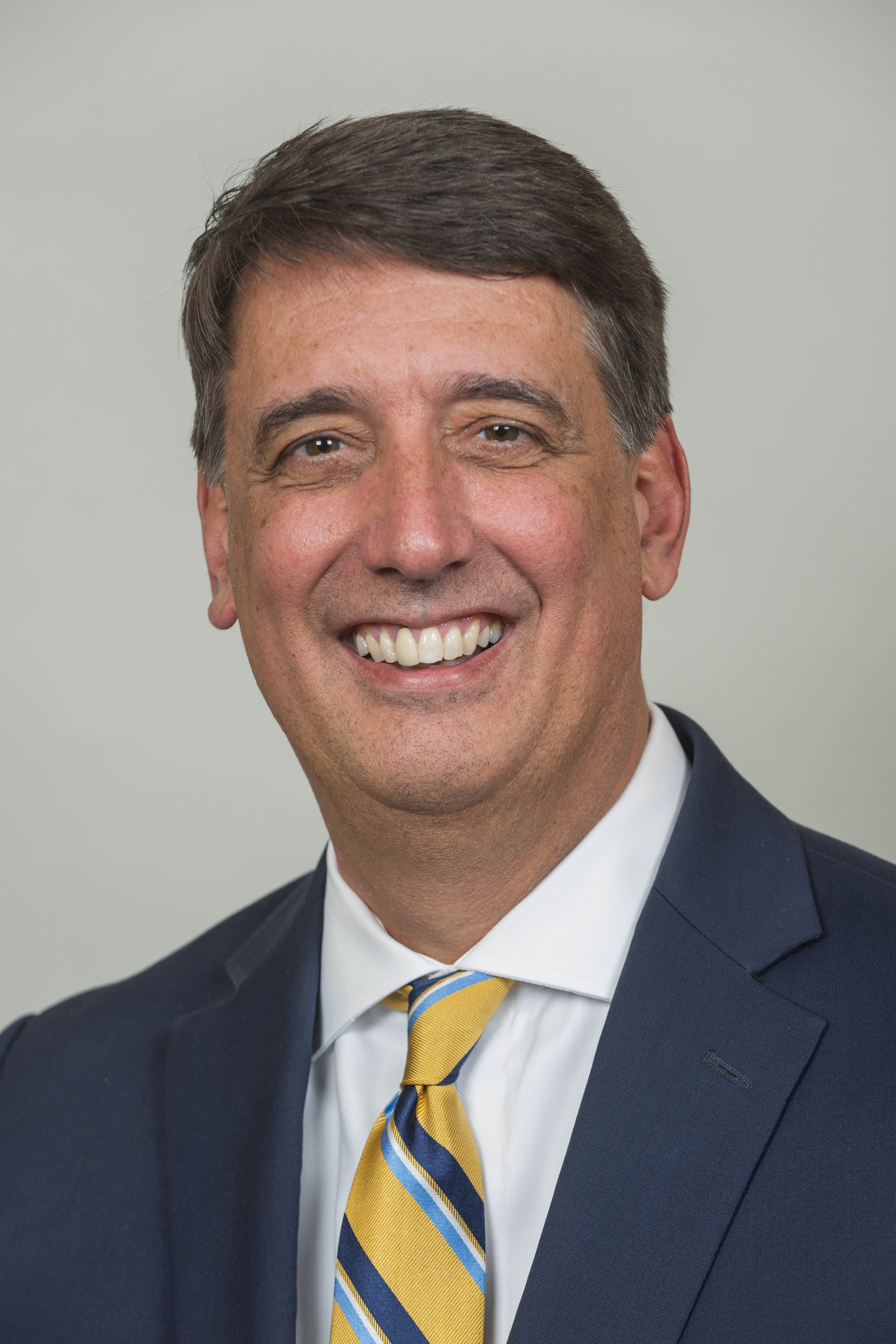

Majority Leader of the Maryland Senate
- In office January 9, 2019 – January 8, 2020
- Preceded by: Douglas J. J. Peters
- Succeeded by: Nancy J. King

Member of the Maryland Senate from the 13th district
- Incumbent
- Assumed office January 14, 2015
- Preceded by: James N. Robey

Member of the Maryland House of Delegates from the 13th district
- In office January 10, 2007 – January 14, 2015 Serving with Shane Pendergrass, Frank S. Turner
- Preceded by: Neil F. Quinter
- Succeeded by: Vanessa Atterbeary

Member of the Howard County Council from the 3rd district
- In office December 1998 – December 4, 2006
- Preceded by: Dennis R. Schrader
- Succeeded by: Jennifer R. Terrasa

Personal details
- Born: Guy Joseph Guzzone; March 27, 1964 (age 62) Baltimore, Maryland, U.S.
- Party: Democratic
- Spouse: Pam Guzzone (divorced)
- Children: 3
- Education: University of Maryland, College Park (BA, MPA)

Guy Joseph Guzzone (born March 27, 1964) is an American politician who has served as a member of the Maryland Senate representing District 13 since 2015, and as its majority leader from 2019 to 2020. A member of the Democratic Party, he previously represented the district in the Maryland House of Delegates from 2007 to 2015, and as a member of the Howard County Council from 1998 to 2006.

== Early life and education ==
Guzzone was born in Baltimore on March 27, 1964. He graduated from Parkville High School and attended the University of Maryland, College Park, where he earned his Bachelor of Arts degree in economics and government & politics in 1986, and later his Master of Public Administration degree in public management as a MacArthur Graduate Fellow in 1988. Guzzone also attended Georgetown University, where he earned an executive certificate in juvenile justice and multi-system integration in 2008.

== Political career ==
Guzzone first got involved in politics as a college intern for U.S. Representative Bill Nelson. He later served as a special assistant to county councilmember Shane Pendergrass from 1991 to 1995. In 1994, Guzzone was appointed to the Kings Contrivance village board of directors, serving as its chair from 1995 to 1998. From 1996 to 1998, he served as the state director of the Maryland Sierra Club.

=== Howard County Council ===
On October 26, 1997, Guzzone announced that he would run for the Howard County Council in District 3, seeking to succeed Republican Dennis R. Schrader, who unsuccessfully ran for county executive. He ran unopposed the Democratic primary in September 1998, and faced Republican Wanda Hurt in the general election. The election was seen as the most competitive in the county, as the winning candidate would decide who held the majority on the county council. Guzzone defeated Hurt in the general election on November 5, 1998, with 58.1 percent of the vote. He was sworn into the county council in December 1998, and served as the council's chair in 2001 and from 2003 to 2005.

In 2006, Guzzone chaired the transition team of Howard County Executive-elect Kenneth Ulman.

=== Maryland House of Delegates ===
In November 2005, after initially considering a run for county executive, Guzzone announced that he would run for the Maryland House of Delegates in District 13, challenging Neil F. Quinter, who briefly ran for Congress in 2006. During the Democratic primary, he ran on a slate with incumbent state delegates Shane Pendergrass and Frank S. Turner. Guzzone won the Democratic primary in September 2006, placing third and edging out Quinter, and defeated Republican challengers in the general election. Guzzone was sworn in on January 10, 2007, and was a member of the Appropriations Committee during his entire tenure.

In October 2013, Guzzone was named to the Howard County organizing team for Lieutenant Governor Anthony Brown's gubernatorial campaign.

=== Maryland Senate ===
On June 14, 2013, Guzzone announced that he would run for the Maryland Senate in District 13, seeking to succeed retiring state senator James N. Robey. During his campaign, he ran on a slate with Vanessa Atterbeary and state delegates Shane Pendergrass and Frank S. Turner. Guzzone ran in the Democratic primary unopposed and won the general election on November 4, 2014, defeating Republican challenger Jody Venkatesan with 62.3 percent of the vote.

Guzzone was sworn in on January 14, 2015, and has been a member of the Budget and Taxation Committee during his entire tenure.

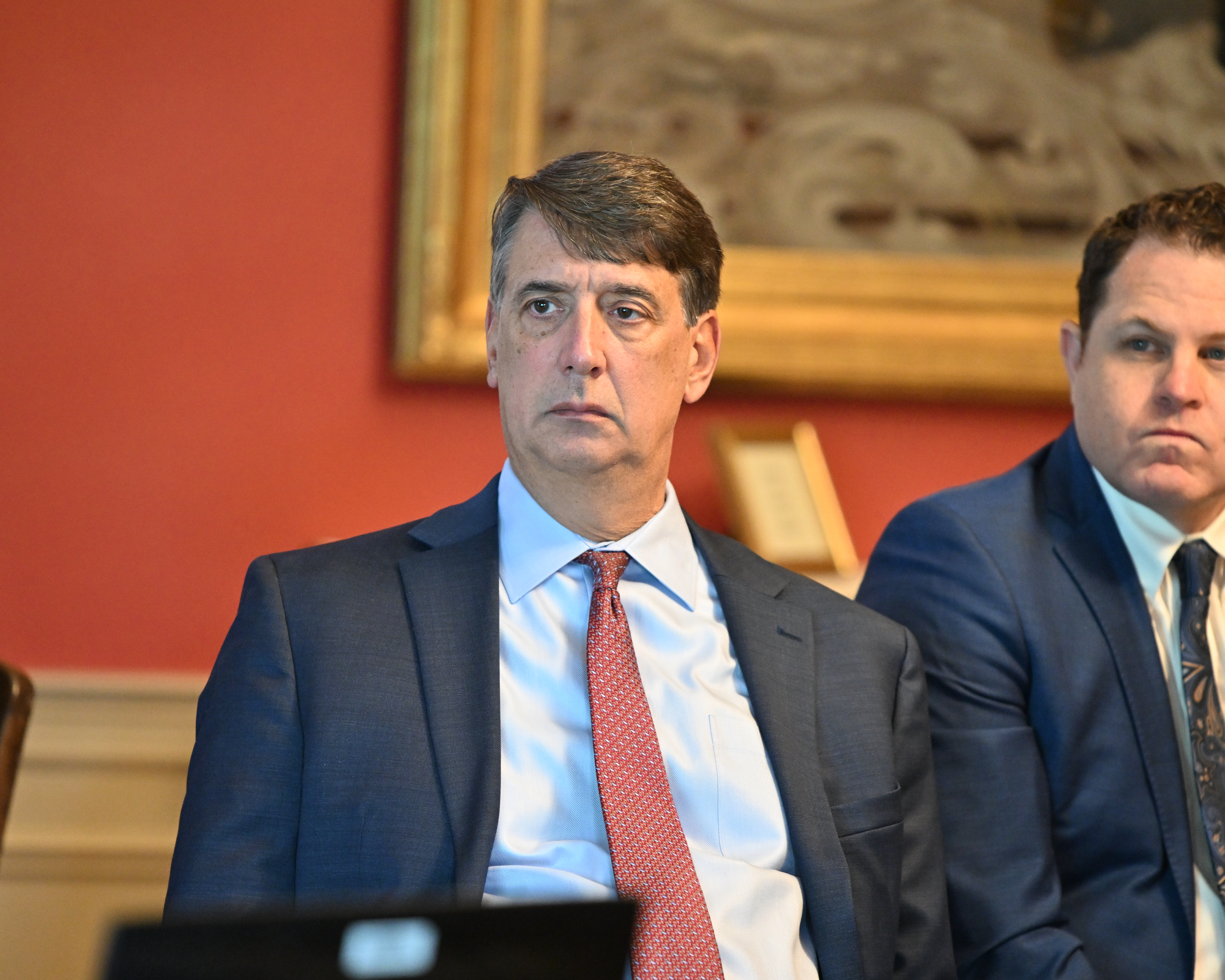
Guzzone in 2023

In November 2018, Senate President Thomas V. Miller Jr. announced that he would appoint Guzzone as majority leader of the Maryland Senate. After Miller announced that he had been diagnosed with prostate cancer, he was seen as a likely candidate to succeed him if Miller was to step down, but he declined, instead endorsing eventual Senate President Bill Ferguson, who returned the favor by appointing Guzzone to chair the Senate Budget and Taxation Committee following his election. During his tenure as chair, he implemented a three-minute limit on testimonies and frequently utilized work groups to develop policy.

In 2018, Guzzone chaired the transition team of Howard County Executive-elect Calvin Ball III.

Guzzone was a delegate to the 2024 Democratic National Convention, pledged to Kamala Harris.

== Personal life ==
Guzzone was married to Pam Guzzone, whom he moved from Parkville to Columbia with in 1992 and later divorced. Pam was elected to the Maryland House of Delegates in 2022. Together, they have three children.

Guzzone has Lyme disease.

== Political positions ==
=== Budgets ===
During the 2017 legislative session, Guzzone introduced legislation to increase funding for the Maryland Legal Services Corporation, the state's largest funder of civil legal aid, which passed and became law.

During the 2021 legislative session, Guzzone said he supported Governor Hogan's RELIEF Act, which provided $750 stimulus checks to low-income families in Maryland, calling it a "good place for us to start". He supported the "Maryland Senate Recovery Now" amendment to the bill, which added $520 million in grants to businesses and workers on unemployment insurance to the bill.

In February 2023, Guzzone said that the Budget and Taxation Committee would begin interpreting bills with funding mandates through the lens of a constitutional amendment passed by voters in 2020 that gave the legislature increased power over fiscal policy.

=== Education ===
In January 2012, Guzzone criticized Governor Martin O'Malley's plan to shift responsibility for teachers' pensions to local jurisdictions, saying that he would need to be "really convinced" to vote for it.

In January 2020, after Prince George's County Executive Angela Alsobrooks and Baltimore mayor Jack Young expressed concern about the cost of the Blueprint for Maryland's Future, Guzzone promised to get "every county and city" on board with the funding formulas in the bill. Legislators would later amend the bill's funding formulas to lessen its impacts on poorer areas of the state, which decreased the bill's cost to Prince George's County to $183 million and to Baltimore to $170 million by 2030. Guzzone also supported legislation to creating a tax on online advertising and expanding the state sales tax to include online streaming services, and an amendment that would limit the Blueprint's implementation if state revenues dropped by more than 7.5 percent.

=== Electoral reform ===
During the 2019 legislative session, Guzzone supported legislation that would designate Maryland's votes in the Electoral College to the winner of the national popular vote provided a red state agrees to do the same.

In 2020, Guzzone supported a resolution calling on Congress to hold a convention to overturn Citizens United v. FEC.

=== Environment ===
During the 2019 legislative session, Guzzone introduced legislation to establish a Forest Conservation Task Force to develop recommendations on how to address deforestation without disrupting development. The bill passed and became law. In 2021, he introduced legislation to establish the Clean Water Commerce Fund to reduce pollution in state waterways, which passed and became law.

In February 2019, Guzzone voted for a bill that would allow the Howard County Council to impose a tax on plastic bags, but said he would have preferred if the bill banned plastic bags instead of charging a fee.

=== Gambling ===
In August 2012, Guzzone said he was undecided on legislation to expand gambling in Maryland.

During the 2020 legislative session, Guzzone introduced the Racing and Community Development Act, a bill that would provide $375.5 million in state funding to refurbish Pimlico Race Course and Laurel Park, financed by revenues from slot machines and gambling. He also supported legislation to legalize sports betting in Maryland, which was overwhelming approved by voters in the 2020 elections.

=== Gun policy ===
During the 2013 legislative session, Guzzone supported the Firearm Safety Act, a bill that placed restrictions on firearm purchases and magazine capacity in semi-automatic rifles.

=== Healthcare ===
In February 2011, Guzzone supported legislation to establish a single-payer healthcare system in Maryland.

During the 2017 legislative session, Guzzone introduced, but later withdrew, legislation that would provide terminally ill patients with palliative care. He also introduced the "Keep the Door Open Act", which would increase state payments to community behavioral health clinics and organizations.

=== Labor ===
During the 2013 legislative session, Guzzone introduced legislation to give library workers in Howard County collective bargaining rights.

In June 2020, Guzzone expressed concerns with provisions of Governor Larry Hogan's 2021 budget that reduced worker salaries by $95 million and eliminated 92 positions. He supported a proposal in Hogan's 2022 budget to give state employees a $1,000 bonus.

During the 2021 legislative session, Guzzone introduced legislation that would give community college employees collective bargaining rights. The bill passed and became law after legislators voted to override Hogan's veto on the bill during the special legislative session later that year.

=== Marijuana ===
In June 2019, Guzzone was appointed to a task force to study the legalize recreational cannabis in Maryland. During the 2021 legislative session, he supported legislation to legalize recreational cannabis in Maryland.

=== Social issues ===
During the 2011 legislative session, Guzzone voted for legislation that would ban discrimination against transgender and non-binary people. In 2012, he campaigned against Question 6, which sought to repeal same-sex marriage in Maryland.

In September 2016, following a report that accused Howard County Sheriff James Fitzgerald of discrimination and harassment toward his employees, Guzzone said that he hoped Fitzgerald would resign. After the Howard County Council began considering impeaching him from office, Fitzgerald announced that he would resign in October.

During the 2026 legislative session, Guzzone introduced a bill to codify federal protections drawn from the U.S. Supreme Court's 1999 decision in Olmstead v. L.C., which made it illegal to discriminate against people with disabilities in community settings.

=== Taxes ===
In 2005, Guzzone supported legislation to cut property taxes for seniors. In 2006, he introduced legislation to provide tax credits to homeowners who install solar or geothermal energy equipment, which was unanimously approved by the county council and became law. Guzzone also opposed a bill that would further cut property taxes for seniors, supporting a motion to table the bill.

During the 2013 legislative session, Guzzone voted for legislation to index the state's fuel taxes to inflation to pay for state transportation projects. In 2023, he opposed an amendment to the state budget that would have decoupled the fuel tax, saying that the state needed the tax for another two years while expressing support for a new funding mechanism to pay for state transportation projects.

=== Transportation ===
In April 2021, Guzzone blocked legislation that would codify promises made by the Maryland Department of Transportation toward highway expansion projects on Interstate 270 and the Capital Beltway, saying that there were "too many issues" with the bill.

== Electoral history ==
Howard County Council District 3 Democratic primary election, 1998
| Party | Candidate | Votes | % |
|---|---|---|---|
| Democratic | Guy Guzzone | 2,283 | 100.0 |

Howard County Council District 3 election, 1998
| Party | Candidate | Votes | % |
|---|---|---|---|
| Democratic | Guy Guzzone | 7,679 | 58.1 |
| Republican | Wanda Hurt | 5,522 | 41.8 |
| Write-in | | 14 | 0.1 |

Howard County Council District 3 election, 2002
| Party | Candidate | Votes | % |
|---|---|---|---|
| Democratic | Guy Guzzone (incumbent) | 9,778 | 65.7 |
| Republican | Diane Wilson | 5,091 | 34.2 |
| Write-in | | 9 | 0.1 |

Maryland House of Delegates District 13 Democratic primary election, 2006
| Party | Candidate | Votes | % |
|---|---|---|---|
| Democratic | Shane Pendergrass (incumbent) | 8,301 | 27.4 |
| Democratic | Guy Guzzone | 7,502 | 24.7 |
| Democratic | Frank S. Turner (incumbent) | 7,027 | 23.2 |
| Democratic | Neil F. Quinter (incumbent) | 5,252 | 17.3 |
| Democratic | Nina Basu | 2,242 | 7.4 |

Maryland House of Delegates District 13 election, 2006
| Party | Candidate | Votes | % |
|---|---|---|---|
| Democratic | Guy Guzzone | 26,891 | 22.3 |
| Democratic | Shane Pendergrass (incumbent) | 26,633 | 22.1 |
| Democratic | Frank S. Turner (incumbent) | 24,437 | 20.3 |
| Republican | Mary Beth Tung | 15,216 | 12.6 |
| Republican | Rick Bowers | 13,665 | 11.4 |
| Republican | Loretta Gaffney | 13,466 | 11.2 |
| Write-in | | 84 | 0.1 |

Maryland House of Delegates District 13 election, 2010
| Party | Candidate | Votes | % |
|---|---|---|---|
| Democratic | Guy Guzzone (incumbent) | 27,140 | 21.9 |
| Democratic | Shane Pendergrass (incumbent) | 25,894 | 20.9 |
| Democratic | Frank S. Turner (incumbent) | 24,823 | 20.1 |
| Republican | Ed Priola | 16,225 | 13.1 |
| Republican | Loretta Gaffney | 14,844 | 12.0 |
| Republican | Jeff Robinson | 14,680 | 11.9 |
| Write-in | | 91 | 0.1 |

Maryland Senate District 13 Democratic primary election, 2014
| Party | Candidate | Votes | % |
|---|---|---|---|
| Democratic | Guy J. Guzzone | 9,423 | 100.0 |

Maryland Senate District 13 election, 2014
| Party | Candidate | Votes | % |
|---|---|---|---|
| Democratic | Guy J. Guzzone | 25,026 | 62.3 |
| Republican | Jody Venkatesan | 15,126 | 37.6 |
| Write-in | | 26 | 0.1 |

Maryland Senate District 13 election, 2018
| Party | Candidate | Votes | % |
|---|---|---|---|
| Democratic | Guy Guzzone (incumbent) | 47,309 | 97.4 |
| Write-in | | 1,267 | 2.6 |

Maryland Senate District 13 election, 2022
| Party | Candidate | Votes | % |
|---|---|---|---|
| Democratic | Guy Guzzone (incumbent) | 37,241 | 97.1 |
| Write-in | | 1,095 | 2.9 |

Maryland Senate
| Preceded by Douglas J. J. Peters | Majority Leader of the Maryland Senate; 2019–2020 | Succeeded by Nancy J. King |
