= Anne Arundel County Delegation =

Legislative body in Maryland, USA

The Anne Arundel County Delegation refers to the members of the Maryland House of Delegates who reside in or represent legislative districts that are made of all or parts of Anne Arundel County, Maryland in the United States of America. Three delegates are elected from each district, though some districts are divided into sub-districts.

== Authority and responsibilities ==
The Delegation is responsible for representing the interests, needs and concerns of the citizens of Anne Arundel County in the Maryland House of Delegates, the lower chamber of the Maryland General Assembly.

== Current members ==
As of 2025, the current members of the Anne Arundel County Delegation are:

=== Senate ===
District	Counties represented	Senator	Party	First elected	Committee
12	Anne Arundel, Howard	Clarence Lam	Democratic	2018	Finance
21	Anne Arundel, Prince George's	James Rosapepe	Democratic	2006	Budget and Taxation
30	Anne Arundel	Shaneka Henson	Democratic	2025	Judicial Proceedings
31	Anne Arundel	Bryan Simonaire	Republican	2006	Education, Energy, and the Environment
32	Anne Arundel	Pamela Beidle	Democratic	2018	Finance
33	Anne Arundel	Dawn Gile	Democratic	2022	Finance

=== House of Delegates ===
District	Counties represented	Delegate	Party	First elected	Committee
12B	Anne Arundel	Gary Simmons	Democratic	2022	Judiciary
21	Anne Arundel, Prince George's	Mary A. Lehman	Democratic	2018	Environment and Transportation
21	Anne Arundel, Prince George's	Ben Barnes	Democratic	2006	Appropriations
21	Anne Arundel, Prince George's	Joseline Pena-Melnyk	Democratic	2006	Health and Government Operations
30A	Anne Arundel	Dylan Behler	Democratic	2025	
30A	Anne Arundel	Dana Jones	Democratic	2022	Appropriations
30B	Anne Arundel	Seth A. Howard	Republican	2014	Economic Matters
31	Anne Arundel	Nic Kipke	Republican	2006	Health and Government Operations
31	Anne Arundel	Brian Chrisholm	Republican	2018	Health and Government Operations
31	Anne Arundel	LaToya Nkongolo	Republican	2025	Judiciary
32	Anne Arundel	J. Sandy Bartlett	Democratic	2018	Judiciary
32	Anne Arundel	Mark S. Chang	Democratic	2014	Appropriations
32	Anne Arundel	Michael J. Rogers	Democratic	2018	Economic Matters
33A	Anne Arundel	Andrew Pruski	Democratic	2022	Economic Matters
33B	Anne Arundel	Stuart Schmidt Jr.	Republican	2022	Judiciary
33C	Anne Arundel	Heather Bagnall	Democratic	2018	Health and Government Operations

== Former members ==
District	Member	Party	Years	Lifespan
30	Sarah Elfreth	Democratic	2019–2025	1988–present
31	Rachel Muñoz	Republican	2021–2025	1986–present
31A	Ned Carey	Democratic	2015–2023	1962–present
33	Sid Saab	Republican	2015–2023	1971–present
33	Michael E. Malone	Republican	2015–2021	1967–present
30A	Alice J. Cain	Democratic	2019–2020	1967–present
30A	John C. Astle	Democratic	1995–2019	1943–present
30A	Michael E. Busch	Democratic	1987–2019	1947–2019
21	Barbara A. Frush	Democratic	1995–2019	1945–present
33	Tony McConkey	Republican	2003–2019	1963–present
30A	Herbert H. McMillan	Republican	2003–2007; 2011–2019	1958–present
31B	Meagan Simonaire	Democratic (Note: Changed party affiliation from Republican to Democrat on October 15, 2018)	2014–2019	1990–present
32	Theodore J. Sophocleus	Democratic	1993–1995; 1999–2018	1939–2018
31	Don H. Dwyer Jr.	Republican	2003–2015	1958–present
33B	Robert A. Costa	Republican	2003–2015	1958–present
33B	Ron George	Republican	2007–2015	1953–present
32	Mary Ann Love	Democratic	1993–2015	1940–2022
31	Steve Schuh	Republican	2007–2014	1960–present
30	Virginia P. Clagett	Republican	1995–2011	1943–present
21	Pauline Menes	Democratic	1967–2007	1924–2009
33A	David G. Boschert	Republican	1999–2007	1947–2011
31	Joan Cadden	Republican	1991–2007	1941–present
33A	Terry R. Gilleland Jr.	Republican	2003–2007	1977–present
31	Philip C. Jimeno	Democratic	1985–2007	1947–present
21	Brian R. Moe	Democratic	1998–2007	1962–present
31	John R. Leopold	Republican	1983–1990; 1995–2006	1943–present
30	Phillip D. Bissett	Republican	1991–1999	1956–present
32	C. Edward Middlebrooks	Republican	1995–1999	1955–present
