= 2018 Maryland House of Delegates election =

- November 6, 2018

All 141 seats in the Maryland House of Delegates 71 seats needed for a majority
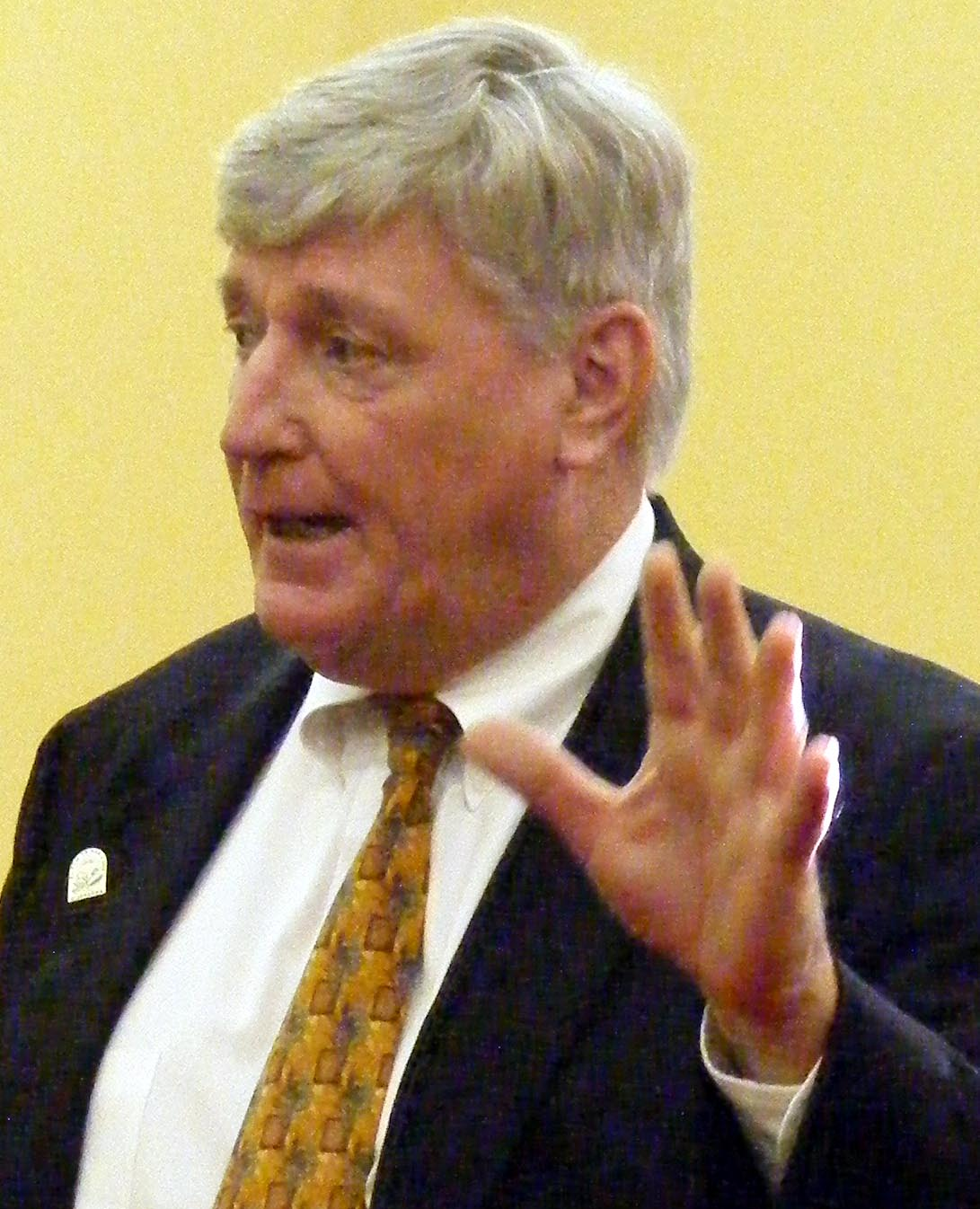

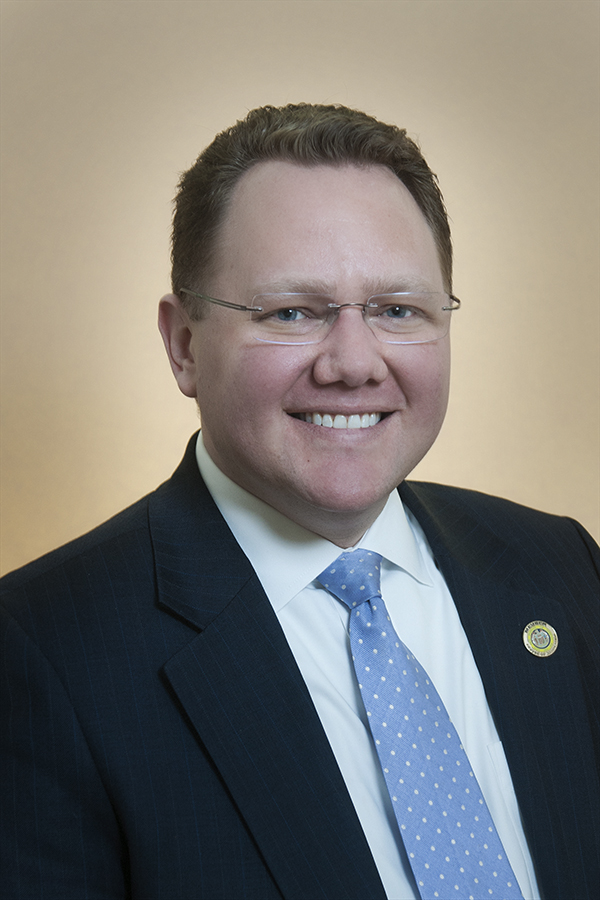
	Majority party	Minority party
Leader	Michael E. Busch	Nic Kipke
Party	Democratic	Republican
Last election	91	50
Seats before	92	49
Seats won	99	42
Seat change	▲7	▼7
Popular vote	2,940,371	1,462,097
Percentage	65.5%	32.6%
Swing	▲8.01%	▼9.30%
- Results: Democratic gain Republican gain Democratic hold Republican hold
Speaker before election
Michael E. Busch
Democratic
Elected Speaker
Michael E. Busch
Democratic

The 2018 Maryland House of Delegates elections were held on November 6, 2018, as part of the biennial United States elections. All 141 of Maryland's state delegates were up for reelection.

Prior to the election, there was little doubt that Democrats would hold their majority in the chamber. Maryland's House of Delegates has had a Democratic majority since the elections of 1920, and it remains a solidly Democratic in elections at both the national and state level. Still, there was some discussion about whether or not Republicans would be able to make inroads in the chamber, especially considering that popular incumbent governor Larry Hogan was running for reelection at the top of the ticket simultaneously. These hopes were not met; though Hogan won his race by double digits, there was very little down-ballot appetite for Republicans, including in the House of Delegates.

Democrats picked off eight seats from Republicans, while Republicans flipped one seat from Democrats. The result was a net gain of seven seats for the Democrats, which came from across the state. Six counties had seats flip to the Democrats, including two in Baltimore County. The one seat Republicans did pick up was in a conservative Anne Arundel County district where a retiring incumbent had switched parties from Republican to Democratic the month before the election.

Overall, the results were a seen as a disappointment for Republicans, who had hoped Hogan's success would carry more Republicans to Annapolis. After the elections, Democrats held 99 seats to the Republicans' 42, meaning Democrats were in possession of more than 70% of seats in the chamber—maintaining their three-fifths supermajority capable of overriding gubernatorial vetoes. Many factors contributed to the Democrats' gains, but President Donald Trump's unpopularity in Maryland, as well as the state's large and growing minority population and its heavily suburban nature, were among the most important.

== Retiring incumbents ==
=== Democrats ===
1. District 11: Dan K. Morhaim retired.
2. District 12: Clarence Lam retired to run for state senator in District 11.
3. District 13: Frank S. Turner retired.
4. District 15: Aruna Miller retired to run for Congress in Maryland's 6th congressional district.
5. District 16: William Frick retired to run for Montgomery County Executive.
6. District 17: Andrew Platt retired.
7. District 18: Ana Sol Gutierrez retired to run for the Montgomery County Council in District 1.
8. District 18: Jeff Waldstreicher retired to run for state senator in District 18.
9. District 19: Benjamin F. Kramer retired to run for state senator in District 19.
10. District 20: Sheila E. Hixson retired.
11. District 21: Barbara A. Frush retired.
12. District 24: Carolyn J. B. Howard retired.
13. District 25: Angela Angel retired to run for state senator in District 25.
14. District 26: Tony Knotts retired to run for the Prince George's County Council in District 8.
15. District 28: Sally Y. Jameson retired.
16. District 31B: Meagan Simonaire retired.
17. District 32: Alice Sophocleus retired.
18. District 32: Pamela Beidle retired to run for state senator in District 32.
19. District 39: Charles E. Barkley retired to run for an at-large seat on the Montgomery County Council.
20. District 40: Antonio Hayes retired to run for state senator in District 40.
21. District 43: Mary L. Washington retired to run for state senator in District 43.
22. District 45: Cory McCray retired to run for state senator in District 45.

=== Republicans ===
1. District 4: Kathy Afzali retired to run for Frederick County Executive.
2. District 4: David E. Vogt III retired.
3. District 7: Pat McDonough retired to run for Baltimore County Executive.
4. District 8: Christian Miele retired to run for state senator in District 8.
5. District 30: Herbert H. McMillan retired.
6. District 38C: Mary Beth Carozza retired to run for state senator in District 38.
7. District 42B: Chris West retired to run for state senator in District 42.
8. District 42B: Susan L. M. Aumann retired.

== Incumbents defeated ==
=== In primaries ===
==== Democrats ====
1. District 19: Maricé Morales lost renomination to Charlotte Crutchfield, Vaughn Stewart, and incumbent Bonnie Cullison.
2. District 23B: Joseph F. Vallario Jr. lost renomination to Ron Watson and incumbent Marvin E. Holmes Jr.
3. District 39: Shane Robinson lost renomination to Gabriel Acevero, Lesley Lopez, and incumbent Kirill Reznik.
4. District 40: Bilal Ali and Angela Gibson lost renomination to Dalya Attar, Tony Bridges, and incumbent Samuel I. Rosenberg.
5. District 47A: Jimmy Tarlau lost renomination to Julian Ivey and incumbent Diana M. Fennell.
6. District 47B: Carlo Sanchez lost renomination to Wanika B. Fisher.

=== In the general election ===
==== Republicans ====
1. District 3B: William Folden lost to Kenneth P. Kerr.
2. District 8: Joe Cluster lost to Harry Bhandari, Joseph C. Boteler III, and incumbent Eric M. Bromwell.
3. District 9B: Robert Flanagan lost to Courtney Watson.
4. District 29B: Deb Rey lost to Brian M. Crosby.
5. District 33: Tony McConkey lost to Heather Bagnall and incumbents Michael E. Malone and Sid Saab.
6. District 34A: Glen Glass lost to Steven C. Johnson and incumbent Mary Ann Lisanti.

== Predictions ==
Source	Ranking	As of
Governing	Safe D	October 8, 2018

== List of districts ==
All election results are from the Maryland Board of Elections.

=== District 1A ===
2018 Maryland's 1A House of Delegates district election
Party	Candidate	Votes	%
Republican	Wendell R. Beitzel (incumbent)	11,149	77.6%
Democratic	Michael Dreisbach	3,190	22.2%
Write-in		21	0.1%
Total votes		14,360	100%
Republican hold			

=== District 1B ===
2018 Maryland's 1B House of Delegates district election
Party	Candidate	Votes	%
Republican	Jason C. Buckel (incumbent)	8,074	62.6%
Democratic	Penny Lyn Walker	4,826	37.4%
Write-in		5	0.0%
Total votes		12,905	100%
Republican hold			

=== District 1C ===
2018 Maryland's 1C House of Delegates district election
Party	Candidate	Votes	%
Republican	Mike McKay (incumbent)	10,228	82.1%
Green	Daniel DelMonte	2,177	17.5%
Write-in		54	0.4%
Total votes		12,459	100%
Republican hold			

=== District 2A ===
2018 Maryland's 2A House of Delegates district election
Party	Candidate	Votes	%
Republican	Neil Parrott (incumbent)	22,422	40.0%
Republican	William J. Wivell (incumbent)	19,453	34.7%
Green	Andrew J. Barnhart	7,371	13.1%
Green	Charlotte McBrearty	6,683	11.9%
Write-in		141	0.3%
Total votes		56,070	100%
Republican hold			
Republican hold			

=== District 2B ===
2018 Maryland's 2B House of Delegates district election
Party	Candidate	Votes	%
Republican	Paul D. Corderman (incumbent)	5,457	51.9%
Democratic	Peter E. Perini, Sr.	5,028	47.8%
Write-in		25	0.2%
Total votes		10,510	100%
Republican hold			

=== District 3A ===
2018 Maryland's 3A House of Delegates district election
Party	Candidate	Votes	%
Democratic	Karen Lewis Young (incumbent)	18,725	31.4%
Democratic	Carol L. Krimm (incumbent)	18,705	31.3%
Republican	Mike Bowersox	11,157	18.7%
Republican	James Dvorak	9,568	16.0%
Libertarian	Jeremy Harbaugh	1,492	2.5%
Write-in		64	0.1%
Total votes		59,711	100%
Democratic hold			
Democratic hold			

=== District 3B ===
2018 Maryland's 3B House of Delegates district election
Party	Candidate	Votes	%
Democratic	Kenneth P. Kerr	10,091	52.4%
Republican	William Folden (incumbent)	9,168	47.6%
Write-in		13	0.1%
Total votes		19,272	100%
Democratic gain from Republican			

=== District 4 ===
2018 Maryland's 4th House of Delegates district election
Party	Candidate	Votes	%
Republican	Dan Cox	33,303	20.6%
Republican	Barrie Ciliberti (incumbent)	31,817	19.7%
Republican	Jesse Pippy	31,071	19.2%
Democratic	Lois Jarman	22,807	14.1%
Democratic	Ysela Bravo	21,901	13.6%
Democratic	Darrin Ryan Smith	20,462	12.7%
Write-in		92	0.1%
Total votes		161,453	100%
Republican hold			
Republican hold			
Republican hold			

=== District 5 ===
2018 Maryland's 5th House of Delegates district election
Party	Candidate	Votes	%
Republican	Susan W. Krebs (incumbent)	39,236	30.9%
Republican	April Rose (incumbent)	33,991	26.8%
Republican	Haven Shoemaker (incumbent)	33,658	26.5%
Democratic	Emily Shank	19,484	15.4%
Write-in		516	0.4%
Total votes		126,885	100%
Republican hold			
Republican hold			
Republican hold			

=== District 6 ===
2018 Maryland's 6th House of Delegates district election
Party	Candidate	Votes	%
Republican	Robert B. Long (incumbent)	18,291	19.7%
Republican	Robin Grammer Jr. (incumbent)	18,084	19.5%
Republican	Richard W. Metzgar (incumbent)	17,803	19.2%
Democratic	Nicholas C. D'Adamo Jr.	12,847	13.9%
Democratic	Megan Ann Mioduszewski	12,213	13.2%
Democratic	Diane DeCarlo	12,000	12.9%
Libertarian	Michael J. Lyden	1,459	1.6%
Write-in		59	0.1%
Total votes		92,756	100%
Republican hold			
Republican hold			
Republican hold			

=== District 7 ===
2018 Maryland's 7th House of Delegates district election
Party	Candidate	Votes	%
Republican	Kathy Szeliga (incumbent)	38,617	25.4%
Republican	Lauren Arikan	35,476	23.3%
Republican	Richard Impallaria (incumbent)	34,223	22.5%
Democratic	Allison Berkowitz	19,550	12.8%
Democratic	Gordon Koerner	15,614	10.3%
Green	Ryan Sullivan	8,443	5.5%
Write-in		324	0.2%
Total votes		152,247	100%
Republican hold			
Republican hold			
Republican hold			

=== District 8 ===
2018 Maryland's 8th House of Delegates district election
Party	Candidate	Votes	%
Democratic	Eric M. Bromwell (incumbent)	22,485	18.0%
Democratic	Harry Bhandari	22,094	17.7%
Republican	Joseph C. Boteler III	20,802	16.7%
Democratic	Carl W. Jackson	20,232	16.2%
Republican	Joe Cluster (incumbent)	20,084	16.1%
Republican	Joe Norman	18,898	15.2%
Write-in		99	0.1%
Total votes		124,694	100%
Democratic hold			
Democratic gain from Republican			
Republican hold			

=== District 9A ===
2018 Maryland's 9A House of Delegates district election
Party	Candidate	Votes	%
Republican	Trent Kittleman (incumbent)	24,531	30.6%
Republican	Warren E. Miller (incumbent)	19,563	24.4%
Democratic	Natalie Ziegler	18,891	23.6%
Democratic	Steven M. Bolen	17,019	21.3%
Write-in		56	0.1%
Total votes		80,060	100%
Republican hold			
Republican hold			

=== District 9B ===
2018 Maryland's 9B House of Delegates district election
Party	Candidate	Votes	%
Democratic	Courtney Watson	11,742	57.4%
Republican	Robert Flanagan (incumbent)	8,680	42.4%
Write-in		26	0.1%
Total votes		20,448	100%
Democratic gain from Republican			

=== District 10 ===
2018 Maryland's 10th House of Delegates district election
Party	Candidate	Votes	%
Democratic	Adrienne A. Jones (incumbent)	33,830	27.4%
Democratic	Benjamin Brooks (incumbent)	33,066	26.8%
Democratic	Jay Jalisi (incumbent)	32,587	26.4%
Republican	George H. Harman	8,525	6.9%
Republican	Brian Marcos	7,706	6.2%
Republican	Matthew Kaliszak	7,458	6.0%
Write-in		159	0.1%
Total votes		123,331	100%
Democratic hold			
Democratic hold			
Democratic hold			

=== District 11 ===
2018 Maryland's 11th House of Delegates district election
Party	Candidate	Votes	%
Democratic	Jon S. Cardin	33,077	29.3%
Democratic	Shelly L. Hettleman (incumbent)	31,957	28.3%
Democratic	Dana Stein (incumbent)	30,364	26.9%
Republican	Jonathan Porter	16,852	14.9%
Write-in		521	0.5%
Total votes		112,771	100%
Democratic hold			
Democratic hold			
Democratic hold			

=== District 12 ===
2018 Maryland's 12th House of Delegates district election
Party	Candidate	Votes	%
Democratic	Eric Ebersole (incumbent)	30,478	22.7%
Democratic	Jessica Feldmark	29,427	21.9%
Democratic	Terri L. Hill (incumbent)	29,313	21.8%
Republican	Melanie Harris	16,536	12.3%
Republican	Bob Cockey	15,141	11.3%
Republican	Michael Russell	13,509	10.0%
Write-in		126	0.1%
Total votes		134,530	100%
Democratic hold			
Democratic hold			
Democratic hold			

=== District 13 ===
2018 Maryland's 13th House of Delegates district election
Party	Candidate	Votes	%
Democratic	Vanessa Atterbeary (incumbent)	39,470	30.7%
Democratic	Shane Pendergrass (incumbent)	36,519	28.4%
Democratic	Jennifer R. Terrasa	34,921	27.1%
Republican	Chris Yates	17,258	12.3%
Write-in		513	0.4%
Total votes		128,681	100%
Democratic hold			
Democratic hold			
Democratic hold			

=== District 14 ===
2018 Maryland's 14th House of Delegates district election
Party	Candidate	Votes	%
Democratic	Anne Kaiser (incumbent)	37,733	24.5%
Democratic	Pamela E. Queen (incumbent)	35,991	23.4%
Democratic	Eric Luedtke (incumbent)	35,104	22.8%
Republican	Patricia Fenati	15,895	10.3%
Republican	Kevin Dorrance	14,546	9.5%
Republican	Michael A. Ostroff	14,347	9.3%
Write-in		144	0.1%
Total votes		153,760	100%
Democratic hold			
Democratic hold			
Democratic hold			

=== District 15 ===
2018 Maryland's 15th House of Delegates district election
Party	Candidate	Votes	%
Democratic	Kathleen Dumais (incumbent)	36,331	24.6%
Democratic	Lily Qi	34,888	23.6%
Democratic	David Fraser-Hidalgo (incumbent)	33,808	22.9%
Republican	Laurie Halverson	15,678	10.6%
Republican	Harvey Jacobs	14,096	9.5%
Republican	Marc A. King	12,993	8.8%
Write-in		139	0.1%
Total votes		147,933	100%
Democratic hold			
Democratic hold			
Democratic hold			

=== District 16 ===
2018 Maryland's 16th House of Delegates district election
Party	Candidate	Votes	%
Democratic	Ariana Kelly (incumbent)	45,617	30.6%
Democratic	Marc Korman (incumbent)	43,861	29.4%
Democratic	Sara N. Love	43,760	29.4%
Republican	Bill Day	15,321	10.3%
Write-in		520	0.3%
Total votes		149,079	100%
Democratic hold			
Democratic hold			
Democratic hold			

=== District 17 ===
2018 Maryland's 17th House of Delegates district election
Party	Candidate	Votes	%
Democratic	Kumar P. Barve (incumbent)	32,544	30.5%
Democratic	James W. Gilchrist (incumbent)	32,156	30.1%
Democratic	Julie Palakovich Carr	31,508	29.5%
Republican	George Ivan Hernandez	10,228	9.6%
Write-in		437	0.4%
Total votes		106,873	100%
Democratic hold			
Democratic hold			
Democratic hold			

=== District 18 ===
2018 Maryland's 18th House of Delegates district election
Party	Candidate	Votes	%
Democratic	Emily Shetty	36,284	30.4%
Democratic	Alfred C. Carr Jr. (incumbent)	35,988	30.1%
Democratic	Jared Solomon	33,476	28.0%
Republican	Linda Willard	9,836	8.2%
Green	Jon Cook	3,547	3.0%
Write-in		417	0.3%
Total votes		119,548	100%
Democratic hold			
Democratic hold			
Democratic hold			

=== District 19 ===
2018 Maryland's 19th House of Delegates district election
Party	Candidate	Votes	%
Democratic	Charlotte Crutchfield	34,507	25.7%
Democratic	Bonnie Cullison (incumbent)	33,690	25.1%
Democratic	Vaughn Stewart	32,636	24.3%
Republican	Dave Pasti	12,234	9.1%
Republican	Martha Schaerr	10,651	7.9%
Republican	Helen Domenici	10,460	7.8%
Write-in		132	0.1%
Total votes		134,310	100%
Democratic hold			
Democratic hold			
Democratic hold			

=== District 20 ===
2018 Maryland's 20th House of Delegates district election
Party	Candidate	Votes	%
Democratic	David Moon (incumbent)	38,892	35.0%
Democratic	Jheanelle Wilkins (incumbent)	36,750	33.1%
Democratic	Lorig Charkoudian	34,749	31.3%
Write-in		718	0.6%
Total votes		111,109	100%
Democratic hold			
Democratic hold			
Democratic hold			

=== District 21 ===
2018 Maryland's 21st House of Delegates district election
Party	Candidate	Votes	%
Democratic	Ben Barnes (incumbent)	27,567	26.3%
Democratic	Joseline Peña-Melnyk (incumbent)	26,889	25.7%
Democratic	Mary A. Lehman	26,809	25.6%
Republican	Richard Douglas	8,519	8.1%
Republican	Chike Anyanwu	8,313	7.9%
Independent	Ray Ranker	6,472	6.2%
Write-in		234	0.2%
Total votes		104,803	100%
Democratic hold			
Democratic hold			
Democratic hold			

=== District 22 ===
2018 Maryland's 22nd House of Delegates district election
Party	Candidate	Votes	%
Democratic	Tawanna P. Gaines (incumbent)	29,461	33.6%
Democratic	Alonzo T. Washington (incumbent)	27,401	31.2%
Democratic	Anne Healey (incumbent)	26,209	29.9%
Republican	Winnie Obike	4,416	5.0%
Write-in		278	0.3%
Total votes		87,765	100%
Democratic hold			
Democratic hold			
Democratic hold			

=== District 23A ===
2018 Maryland's 23A House of Delegates district election
Party	Candidate	Votes	%
Democratic	Geraldine Valentino-Smith (incumbent)	12,002	74.9%
Republican	Kathleen Kositzky Crank	2,336	14.6%
Democratic	Shabnam Ahmed (write-in)	1,642	10.2%
Write-in		44	0.3%
Total votes		16,024	100%
Democratic hold			

=== District 23B ===
2018 Maryland's 23B House of Delegates district election
Party	Candidate	Votes	%
Democratic	Ron Watson	30,579	50.5%
Democratic	Marvin E. Holmes Jr. (incumbent)	29,235	48.3%
Write-in		685	1.1%
Total votes		60,499	100%
Democratic hold			
Democratic hold			

=== District 24 ===
2018 Maryland's 24th House of Delegates district election
Party	Candidate	Votes	%
Democratic	Andrea Harrison	38,365	36.7%
Democratic	Erek Barron (incumbent)	33,069	31.7%
Democratic	Jazz Lewis (incumbent)	32,406	31.0%
Write-in		586	0.6%
Total votes		104,426	100%
Democratic hold			
Democratic hold			
Democratic hold			

=== District 25 ===
2018 Maryland's 25th House of Delegates district election
Party	Candidate	Votes	%
Democratic	Darryl Barnes (incumbent)	36,845	34.8%
Democratic	Dereck E. Davis (incumbent)	35,229	33.2%
Democratic	Nick Charles	33,411	31.5%
Write-in		474	0.4%
Total votes		105,959	100%
Democratic hold			
Democratic hold			
Democratic hold			

=== District 26 ===
2018 Maryland's 26th House of Delegates district election
Party	Candidate	Votes	%
Democratic	Veronica L. Turner	35,748	35.1%
Democratic	Jay Walker (incumbent)	32,523	32.0%
Democratic	Kris Valderrama (incumbent)	31,153	30.6%
Democratic	Diedra Henry-Spires (write-in)	1,852	1.8%
Write-in		509	0.5%
Total votes		101,785	100%
Democratic hold			
Democratic hold			
Democratic hold			

=== District 27A ===
2018 Maryland's 27A House of Delegates district election
Party	Candidate	Votes	%
Democratic	Susie Proctor (incumbent)	17,534	98.2%
Write-in		322	1.8%
Total votes		17,856	100%
Democratic hold			

=== District 27B ===
2018 Maryland's 27B House of Delegates district election
Party	Candidate	Votes	%
Democratic	Michael A. Jackson (incumbent)	12,335	59.3%
Republican	Michael A. Thomas	8,437	40.6%
Write-in		24	0.1%
Total votes		20,796	100%
Democratic hold			

=== District 27C ===
2018 Maryland's 27C House of Delegates district election
Party	Candidate	Votes	%
Republican	Mark N. Fisher (incumbent)	10,563	55.8%
Democratic	Jason T. Fowler	8,349	44.1%
Write-in		11	0.1%
Total votes		18,923	100%
Republican hold			

=== District 28 ===
2018 Maryland's 28th House of Delegates district election
Party	Candidate	Votes	%
Democratic	Debra Davis	34,236	23.8%
Democratic	Edith J. Patterson (incumbent)	33,383	23.2%
Democratic	C. T. Wilson (incumbent)	32,793	22.8%
Republican	Jim Crawford	15,059	10.5%
Republican	Dave Campbell	15,010	10.4%
Republican	Maureen Janette Woodruff	13,318	9.3%
Write-in		159	0.1%
Total votes		143,958	100%
Democratic hold			
Democratic hold			
Democratic hold			

=== District 29A ===
2018 Maryland's 29A House of Delegates district election
Party	Candidate	Votes	%
Republican	Matthew Morgan (incumbent)	11,471	69.0%
Democratic	Roberta Miles Loker	5,145	30.9%
Write-in		12	0.1%
Total votes		16,628	100%
Republican hold			

=== District 29B ===
2018 Maryland's 29B House of Delegates district election
Party	Candidate	Votes	%
Democratic	Brian M. Crosby	7,351	53.4%
Republican	Deb Rey (incumbent)	6,409	46.5%
Write-in		16	0.1%
Total votes		13,776	100%
Democratic gain from Republican			

=== District 29C ===
2018 Maryland's 29C House of Delegates district election
Party	Candidate	Votes	%
Republican	Jerry Clark (incumbent)	10,087	57.0%
Democratic	Julia Margaret Nichols	7,580	42.8%
Write-in		31	0.2%
Total votes		17,698	100%
Republican hold			

=== District 30A ===
2018 Maryland's 30A House of Delegates district election
Party	Candidate	Votes	%
Democratic	Michael E. Busch (incumbent)	20,080	32.6%
Democratic	Alice J. Cain	18,070	29.3%
Republican	Chelsea Gill	12,097	19.6%
Republican	Bob O'Shea	11,324	18.4%
Write-in		53	0.1%
Total votes		61,624	100%
Democratic hold			
Democratic gain from Republican			

=== District 30B ===
2018 Maryland's 30B House of Delegates district election
Party	Candidate	Votes	%
Republican	Seth A. Howard (incumbent)	10,046	54.4%
Democratic	Mike Shay	8,420	45.6%
Write-in		17	0.1%
Total votes		18,483	100%
Republican hold			

=== District 31A ===
2018 Maryland's 31A House of Delegates district election
Party	Candidate	Votes	%
Democratic	Ned Carey (incumbent)	6,976	56.8%
Republican	Brooks Bennett	5,278	43.0%
Write-in		24	0.2%
Total votes		12,278	100%
Democratic hold			

=== District 31B ===
2018 Maryland's 31B House of Delegates district election
Party	Candidate	Votes	%
Republican	Brian Chisholm	20,573	33.2%
Republican	Nic Kipke (incumbent)	20,434	33.0%
Democratic	Karen Patricia Simpson	11,257	18.2%
Democratic	Harry E. Freeman	9,602	15.5%
Write-in		49	0.1%
Total votes		61,915	100%
Republican gain from Democratic			
Republican hold			

=== District 32 ===
2018 Maryland's 32nd House of Delegates district election
Party	Candidate	Votes	%
Democratic	Mark S. Chang (incumbent)	24,498	20.9%
Democratic	J. Sandy Bartlett	24,220	20.7%
Democratic	Mike Rogers	23,316	19.9%
Republican	Patty Ewing	16,340	13.9%
Republican	Mark E. Bailey	14,520	12.4%
Republican	Tim Walters	14,158	12.1%
Write-in		112	0.1%
Republican	Sandra Lee German (write-in)	38	0.0%
Total votes		117,202	100%
Democratic hold			
Democratic hold			
Democratic hold			

=== District 33 ===
2018 Maryland's 33rd House of Delegates district election
Party	Candidate	Votes	%
Republican	Michael E. Malone (incumbent)	31,581	18.1%
Republican	Sid Saab (incumbent)	28,837	16.5%
Democratic	Heather Bagnall	28,138	16.1%
Republican	Tony McConkey (incumbent)	27,953	16.0%
Democratic	Pam Luby	27,827	16.0%
Democratic	Tracie Cramer Hovermale	26,675	15.3%
Green	Liv Romano	3,083	1.8%
Write-in		174	0.1%
Total votes		174,268	100%
Republican hold			
Republican hold			
Democratic gain from Republican			

=== District 34A ===
2018 Maryland's 34A House of Delegates district election
Party	Candidate	Votes	%
Democratic	Mary Ann Lisanti (incumbent)	13,558	28.5%
Democratic	Steven C. Johnson	11,857	24.9%
Republican	Glen Glass (incumbent)	11,692	24.6%
Republican	J.D. Russell	9,606	20.2%
Democratic	Sarahia Benn (write-in)	740	1.6%
Write-in		85	0.2%
Total votes		47,538	100%
Democratic hold			
Democratic gain from Republican			

=== District 34B ===
2018 Maryland's 34B House of Delegates district election
Party	Candidate	Votes	%
Republican	Susan K. McComas (incumbent)	12,533	65.0%
Democratic	Jeff Dinger	6,706	34.8%
Write-in		57	0.3%
Total votes		19,296	100%
Republican hold			

=== District 35A ===
2018 Maryland's 35A House of Delegates district election
Party	Candidate	Votes	%
Republican	Kevin Hornberger (incumbent)	9,065	63.2%
Democratic	Jobeth Rocky Bowers	5,260	36.7%
Write-in		11	0.1%
Total votes		14,336	100%
Republican hold			

=== District 35B ===
2018 Maryland's 35B House of Delegates district election
Party	Candidate	Votes	%
Republican	Andrew Cassilly (incumbent)	26,494	48.6%
Republican	Teresa E. Reilly (incumbent)	18,107	33.2%
Democratic	Ronnie Teitler Davis	9,834	18.0%
Write-in		128	0.2%
Total votes		54,563	100%
Republican hold			
Republican hold			

=== District 36 ===
2018 Maryland's 36th House of Delegates district election
Party	Candidate	Votes	%
Republican	Steven J. Arentz (incumbent)	29,092	22.6%
Republican	Jay Jacobs (incumbent)	28,897	22.5%
Republican	Jefferson L. Ghrist (incumbent)	27,087	21.1%
Democratic	Crystal Woodward	16,032	12.5%
Democratic	Michael Ian Welker	14,201	11.0%
Democratic	Keirien Taylor	13,246	10.3%
Write-in		72	0.1%
Total votes		128,627	100%
Republican hold			
Republican hold			
Republican hold			

=== District 37A ===
2018 Maryland's 37A House of Delegates district election
Party	Candidate	Votes	%
Democratic	Sheree Sample-Hughes (incumbent)	7,462	68.5%
Republican	Frank E. Cooke	3,413	31.3%
Write-in		15	0.1%
Total votes		10,890	100%
Democratic hold			

=== District 37B ===
2018 Maryland's 37B House of Delegates district election
Party	Candidate	Votes	%
Republican	Johnny Mautz (incumbent)	25,031	43.6%
Republican	Christopher T. Adams (incumbent)	19,498	33.9%
Democratic	Dan O'Hare	12,796	22.3%
Write-in		128	0.2%
Total votes		57,453	100%
Republican hold			
Republican hold			

=== District 38A ===
2018 Maryland's 38A House of Delegates district election
Party	Candidate	Votes	%
Republican	Charles J. Otto (incumbent)	8,707	59.4%
Democratic	Kirkland J. Hall, Sr.	5,939	40.5%
Write-in		20	0.1%
Total votes		14,666	100%
Republican hold			

=== District 38B ===
2018 Maryland's 38B House of Delegates district election
Party	Candidate	Votes	%
Republican	Carl Anderton Jr. (incumbent)	10,021	94.3%
Write-in		611	5.7%
Total votes		10,632	100%
Republican hold			

=== District 38C ===
2018 Maryland's 38C House of Delegates district election
Party	Candidate	Votes	%
Republican	Wayne A. Hartman	15,247	95.4%
Write-in		395	2.5%
Republican	Ed Tinus (write-in)	335	2.1%
Total votes		15,977	100%
Republican hold			

=== District 39 ===
2018 Maryland's 39th House of Delegates district election
Party	Candidate	Votes	%
Democratic	Gabriel Acevero	28,554	31.0%
Democratic	Lesley Lopez	27,722	30.1%
Democratic	Kirill Reznik (incumbent)	25,236	27.4%
Republican	Verelyn Gibbs Watson	10,316	11.2%
Write-in		324	0.4%
Total votes		92,152	100%
Democratic hold			
Democratic hold			
Democratic hold			

=== District 40 ===
2018 Maryland's 40th House of Delegates district election
Party	Candidate	Votes	%
Democratic	Nick Mosby (incumbent)	19,726	30.5%
Democratic	Melissa Wells	18,952	29.3%
Democratic	Frank M. Conaway Jr. (incumbent)	16,767	25.9%
Green	Joshua Harris	8,833	13.6%
Write-in		337	0.5%
Independent	Will Hanna (write-in)	148	0.2%
Total votes		64,763	100%
Democratic hold			
Democratic hold			
Democratic hold			

=== District 41 ===
2018 Maryland's 41st House of Delegates district election
Party	Candidate	Votes	%
Democratic	Dalya Attar	26,605	31.3%
Democratic	Samuel I. Rosenberg (incumbent)	26,333	31.0%
Democratic	Tony Bridges	26,194	30.9%
Green	Drew A. Pate	5,350	6.3%
Write-in		409	0.5%
Total votes		84,891	100%
Democratic hold			
Democratic hold			
Democratic hold			

=== District 42A ===
2018 Maryland's 42A House of Delegates district election
Party	Candidate	Votes	%
Democratic	Stephen W. Lafferty (incumbent)	11,736	70.0%
Republican	Stephen A. McIntire	5,003	29.9%
Write-in		18	0.1%
Total votes		16,757	100%
Democratic hold			

=== District 42B ===
2018 Maryland's 42B House of Delegates district election
Party	Candidate	Votes	%
Republican	Nino Mangione	20,267	28.6%
Democratic	Michele Guyton	18,815	26.5%
Republican	Tim Robinson	18,090	25.5%
Democratic	Sachin Hebbar	13,670	19.3%
Write-in		53	0.1%
Total votes		70,895	100%
Republican hold			
Democratic gain from Republican			

=== District 43 ===
2018 Maryland's 43rd House of Delegates district election
Party	Candidate	Votes	%
Democratic	Regina T. Boyce	28,500	32.0%
Democratic	Maggie McIntosh (incumbent)	28,348	31.8%
Democratic	Curt Anderson (incumbent)	24,229	27.2%
Green	Bonnie "Raven" Lane	7,490	8.4%
Write-in		545	0.6%
Total votes		89,112	100%
Democratic hold			
Democratic hold			
Democratic hold			

=== District 44A ===
2018 Maryland's 44A House of Delegates district election
Party	Candidate	Votes	%
Democratic	Keith E. Haynes (incumbent)	8,982	99.2%
Write-in		70	0.8%
Total votes		9,052	100%
Democratic hold			

=== District 44B ===
2018 Maryland's 44B House of Delegates district election
Party	Candidate	Votes	%
Democratic	Pat Young (incumbent)	24,226	55.4%
Democratic	Charles E. Sydnor III (incumbent)	19,082	43.6%
Write-in		418	1.0%
Total votes		43,726	100%
Democratic hold			
Democratic hold			

=== District 45 ===
2018 Maryland's 45th House of Delegates district election
Party	Candidate	Votes	%
Democratic	Cheryl Glenn (incumbent)	22,818	27.6%
Democratic	Stephanie M. Smith	22,524	27.3%
Democratic	Talmadge Branch (incumbent)	21,654	26.2%
Green	Glenn L. Ross	4,026	4.9%
Green	Steven "Andy" Ellis	3,735	4.5%
Republican	Ronald M. Owens-Bey	2,825	3.4%
Republican	Jewel Rucker	2,485	3.0%
Republican	Andy Zipay	2,375	2.9%
Write-in		136	0.2%
Total votes		82,578	100%
Democratic hold			
Democratic hold			
Democratic hold			

=== District 46 ===
2018 Maryland's 46th House of Delegates district election
Party	Candidate	Votes	%
Democratic	Brooke Lierman (incumbent)	23,711	28.6%
Democratic	Luke Clippinger (incumbent)	23,023	27.8%
Democratic	Robbyn Lewis (incumbent)	22,582	27.3%
Republican	Jeremy Baron	6,879	8.3%
Republican	Nicholas Wentworth	6,324	7.6%
Write-in		289	0.3%
Total votes		82,808	100%
Democratic hold			
Democratic hold			
Democratic hold			

=== District 47A ===
2018 Maryland's 47A House of Delegates district election
Party	Candidate	Votes	%
Democratic	Julian Ivey	15,981	52.2%
Democratic	Diana M. Fennell (incumbent)	14,192	46.4%
Write-in		429	1.4%
Total votes		30,602	100%
Democratic hold			
Democratic hold			

=== District 47B ===
2018 Maryland's 47B House of Delegates district election
Party	Candidate	Votes	%
Democratic	Wanika B. Fisher	5,065	99.1%
Write-in		48	0.9%
Total votes		5,113	100%
Democratic hold			
