= Sid Saab =

American politician (born 1971)

Sid A. Saab
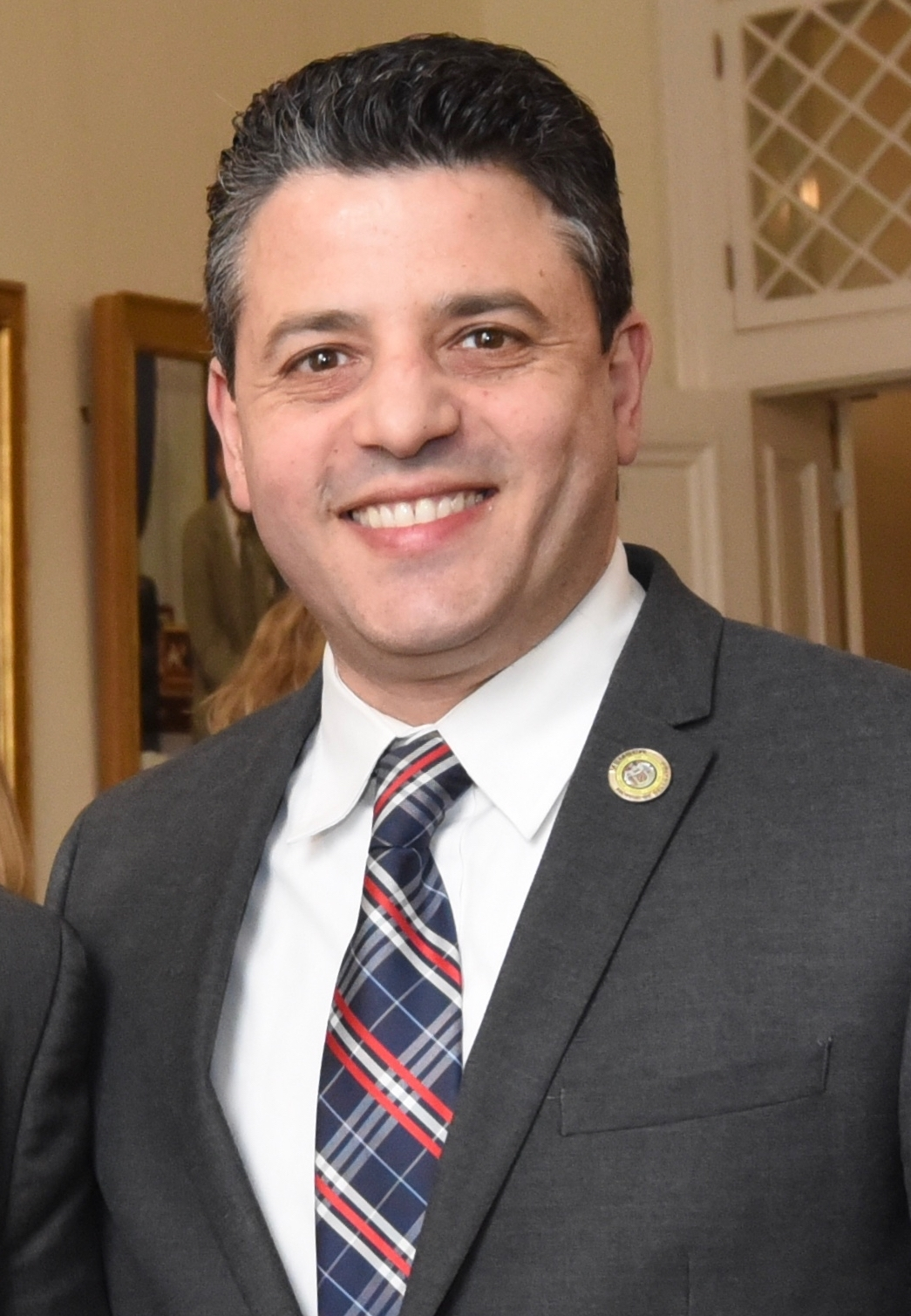
- Saab in 2018

Member of the Maryland House of Delegates from the 33rd district
- In office January 14, 2015 – January 11, 2023
- Preceded by: Robert A. Costa
- Succeeded by: Andrew Pruski

Personal details
- Born: February 20, 1971 (age 55) Lebanon
- Party: Republican
- Spouse: Sarah
- Children: 3
- Website: https://www.sidsaab.com/

Sid A. Saab (born February 20, 1971) is an American politician who was a Republican member of the Maryland House of Delegates, representing district 33 (Anne Arundel County).

== Early life ==
Said Amal Saab was born in Lebanon on February 20, 1971, and migrated to the United States in 1990.

== In the legislature ==
Saab was elected to the House of Delegates in the 2014 General Assembly elections, succeeding delegate Robert A. Costa and becoming the first member of the Maryland General Assembly to have been born in Lebanon.

In January 2020, Saab worked with delegate Bonnie Cullison to introduce a bill that would require hospitals or nursing facilities in the state to begin ensuring personnel wear an identification tag when providing patient care. The bill would pass the House of Delegates and Senate by votes of 136-0 and 45-0, respectively, and would be signed by Governor Larry Hogan. In April 2020, Saab joined delegates Brian Crisholm, Susan Krebs, Matthew Morgan, Teresa Reilly, Kathy Szeliga, and Nic Kipke in pressing the Hogan administration to release data on the 2,000 inmates released at the beginning of the COVID-19 pandemic and COVID-19 case outbreaks in nursing homes and other elder care facilities.

In February 2021, Saab joined delegates Kathy Szeliga and Dan Cox at a protest against abortion at the Maryland State House.

In April 2021, Saab told Maryland Matters that he was actively considering a run for Anne Arundel County executive. In December 2021, he announced that he would seek a third term in the House of Delegates instead of running for executive, but later announced in April 2022 that he would run for Maryland Senate in 2022, seeking to succeed outgoing state Senator Edward R. Reilly.

In October 2022, Saab filed a $2 million defamation lawsuit against his Democratic opponent, Dawn Gile, alleging that some of her campaign literature contained false information about him and his business, including the suggestion that he was under federal indictment. Gile, in a statement to Maryland Matters, called Saab's lawsuit a "distraction and a misuse of the legal system" and implied that his allegations were an act of desperation. Saab was defeated by Gile in the general election. Saab dropped the lawsuits once the election was over.

== Personal life ==
Saab is married to Sarah. They have three children.

Saab co-owns, with state delegate Brian Chisholm, a fitness gym in Severna Park. In February 2021, a former employee filed a lawsuit against the two lawmakers, alleging that she was retaliated against for reporting sexual harassment by another co-worker. A federal jury ruled for the employee in September 2023.

== Electoral history ==
Maryland House of Delegates 33rd District Republican Primary Election, 2014
Party	Candidate	Votes	%
Republican	Cathy Vitale	8,188	29
Republican	Sid Saab	5,917	21
Republican	Tony McConkey	4,142	15
Republican	Jeff Ferguson	3,608	13
Republican	Jamie Falcon	3,595	13
Republican	Nora Keenan	1,414	5
Republican	Jeff Gauges	1,339	5

Maryland House of Delegates 33rd District General Election, 2014
Party	Candidate	Votes	%
Republican	Cathy Vitale	35,987	26
Republican	Sid Saab	29,519	21
Republican	Tony McConkey	27,262	20
Democratic	Henry Green	15,966	12
Democratic	Tom Angelis	15,138	11
Democratic	Kostas Alexakis	13,631	10
Other/Write-Ins	Other/Write-Ins	198	0

Maryland House of Delegates 33rd District Republican Primary Election, 2018
Party	Candidate	Votes	%
Republican	Sid Saab	6,799	27
Republican	Michael Malone	5,145	20
Republican	Tony McConkey	4,249	17
Republican	Stacie MacDonald	3,925	15
Republican	Jerry Walker	3,304	13
Republican	Tom Angelis	1,214	5
Republican	Connor McCoy	798	3

Maryland House of Delegates 4th District General Election, 2018
Party	Candidate	Votes	%
Republican	Michael Malone	31,581	18
Republican	Sid Saab	28,837	17
Democratic	Heather Bagnall	28,138	16
Republican	Tony McConkey	27,953	16
Democratic	Pam Luby	27,827	16
Democratic	Tracie Cramer Hovermale	26,675	15
Green	Liv Romano	3,083	2
Other/Write-Ins	Other/Write-Ins	174	0
