= 2018 Maryland General Assembly election =

2018 Maryland General Assembly election may refer to:

- 2018 Maryland Senate election
- 2018 Maryland House of Delegates election
