= Rachel Muñoz =

American politician (born 1986)

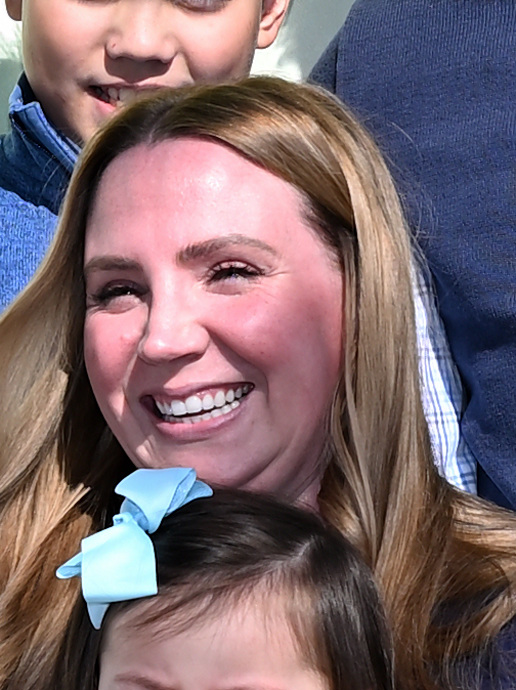

Member of the Maryland House of Delegates
- In office November 8, 2021 – January 1, 2025 Serving with Nic Kipke and Brian Chisholm
- Appointed by: Larry Hogan
- Preceded by: Michael E. Malone
- Succeeded by: LaToya Nkongolo
- Constituency: 33rd district (2021–2023); 31st district (2023–2025)

Personal details
- Born: November 24, 1986 (age 39) Fort Lewis, Washington, U.S.
- Party: Republican
- Spouse: Andrew Muñoz
- Children: 6
- Education: University of Maryland, College Park (BA); University of Maryland, Baltimore (JD)

Rachel Parker Muñoz (born November 24, 1986) is an American politician and lawyer who was a member of the Maryland House of Delegates from 2021 to 2025. A member of the Republican Party, she first represented the 33rd district from 2021 to 2023, and then the 31st district until her resignation in 2025.

== Background ==
Muñoz was born on November 24, 1986, at Fort Lewis in Tacoma, Washington. She was raised in Severna Park, Maryland, where she graduated from Severna Park High School and later attended the University of Maryland, College Park, earning a Bachelor of Arts degree in 2009. She then graduated from the University of Maryland Francis King Carey School of Law in 2021 with a Juris Doctor degree.

Muñoz served as a law clerk at Simons & Campbell in 2019, afterwards working as an editor of the Maryland Journal of International Law from 2019 to 2021. She was a law clerk at Schulte Booth PC from 2021 to 2022, afterwards starting her own law firm, Munoz & Mackenzie.

== In the legislature ==
In June 2021, Muñoz announced that she would run for the Maryland House of Delegates in District 33, and officially filed her candidacy a week later. In August, following the resignation of state delegate Michael E. Malone to serve as a state circuit court judge, she applied to serve the remainder of his term in the Maryland House of Delegates. Her candidacy quickly gained the support of state senator Edward R. Reilly and state delegate Nic Kipke, and she was nominated to fill the vacancy by the Anne Arundel County Republican Central Committee in October. Muñoz was appointed to the Maryland House of Delegates by Governor Larry Hogan on November 4, and was sworn in on November 8. She ran for election to a full four-year term in District 31 and won election in November 2022.

Muñoz served as a member of the Judiciary Committee during her entire tenure. In 2023, Muñoz was nominated for a position on the Women's Caucus of Maryland's executive board, but declined the nomination after consulting with her Republican colleagues.

Muñoz missed nearly 35 percent of House roll call votes during the 2024 legislative session, which she attributed to health-related issues and discovering that she was pregnant. In September 2024, she announced that she would resign from the Maryland House of Delegates on January 1, 2025, to "spend more time with my young family".

== Personal life ==
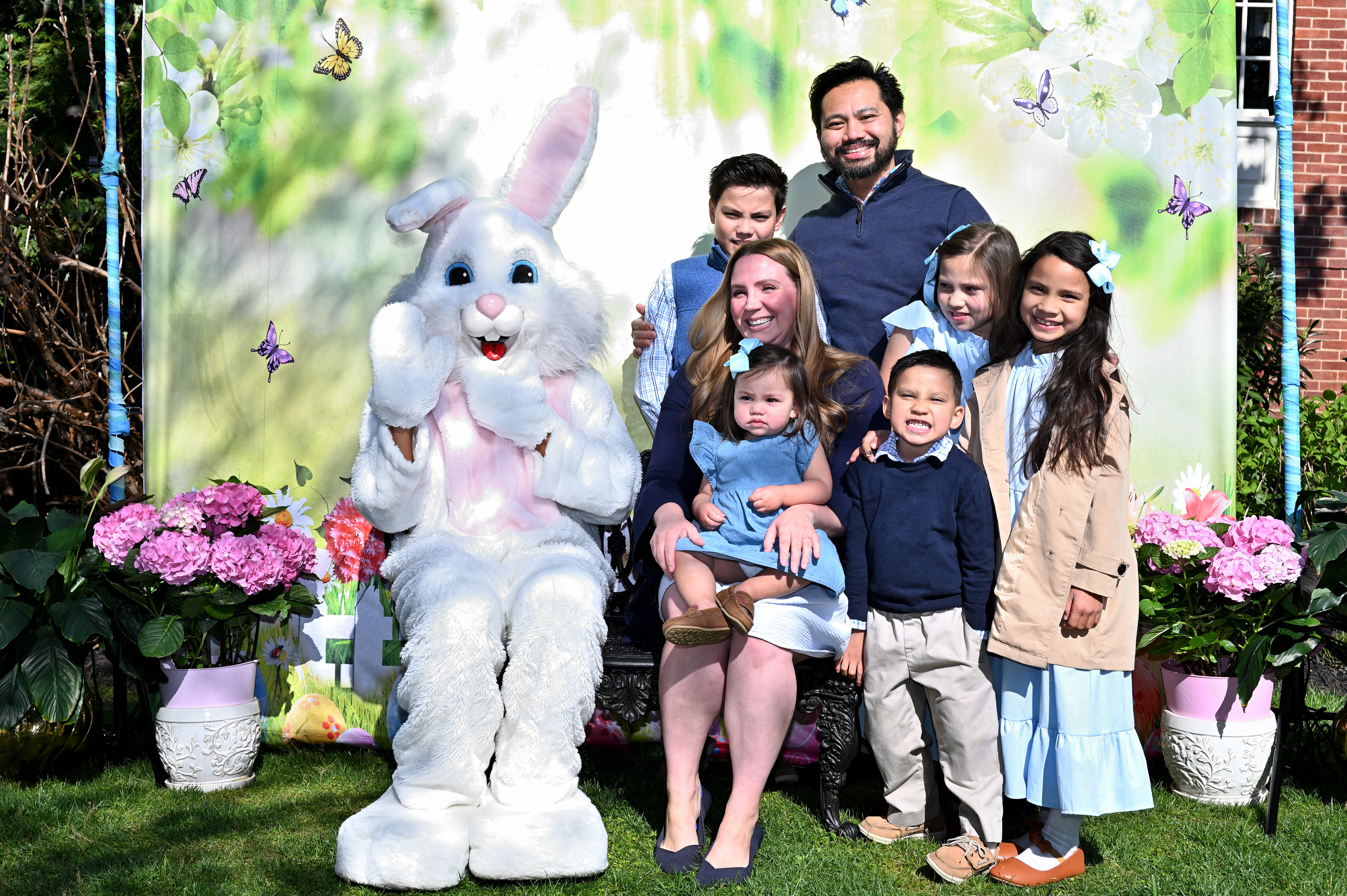
Muñoz's family at an Easter celebration at the Government House, 2024

Muñoz is married and has six children.

In April 2023, Muñoz was diagnosed with melanoma, which was removed during surgery in the following month.

== Political positions ==
Muñoz supports efforts to discourage illegal immigration and opposes providing illegal immigrants with taxpayer-funded benefits.

In March 2022, during debate on the Abortion Care Access Act, Muñoz proposed an amendment that would ban abortions after 24 weeks. The amendment was rejected by a 40–85 vote.

During the 2023 legislative session, Muñoz backed legislation to repeal the Juvenile Justice Reform Act, a bill that was introduced and passed in the previous year's legislative session that restricted the state's ability to charge juveniles for most offenses, and introduced a bill that would make firearm theft a felony. She also introduced a bill that would ban TikTok on state-owned devices and networks, which passed the House of Delegates but did not receive a vote in the state Senate.

During the 2024 legislative session, Muñoz introduced the Gun Theft Felony Act, which would make possessing a stolen firearm a felony offense.

== Electoral history ==
Maryland House of Delegates District 31 Republican primary election, 2022
Party	Candidate	Votes	%
Republican	Nic Kipke (incumbent)	8,764	33.0
Republican	Brian Chisholm (incumbent)	8,261	31.1
Republican	Rachel Muñoz (incumbent)	7,067	26.6
Republican	LaToya Nkongolo	2,465	9.3

Maryland House of Delegates District 31 election, 2022
Party	Candidate	Votes	%
Republican	Nic Kipke (incumbent)	28,518	22.2
Republican	Brian Chisholm (incumbent)	27,570	21.5
Republican	Rachel Muñoz (incumbent)	26,117	20.4
Democratic	Kevin Burke	19,953	15.6
Democratic	Milad Pooran	17,213	15.6
Libertarian	Travis S. Lerol	8,509	6.6
Write-in		356	0.3
