= Cathy Vitale =

American politician

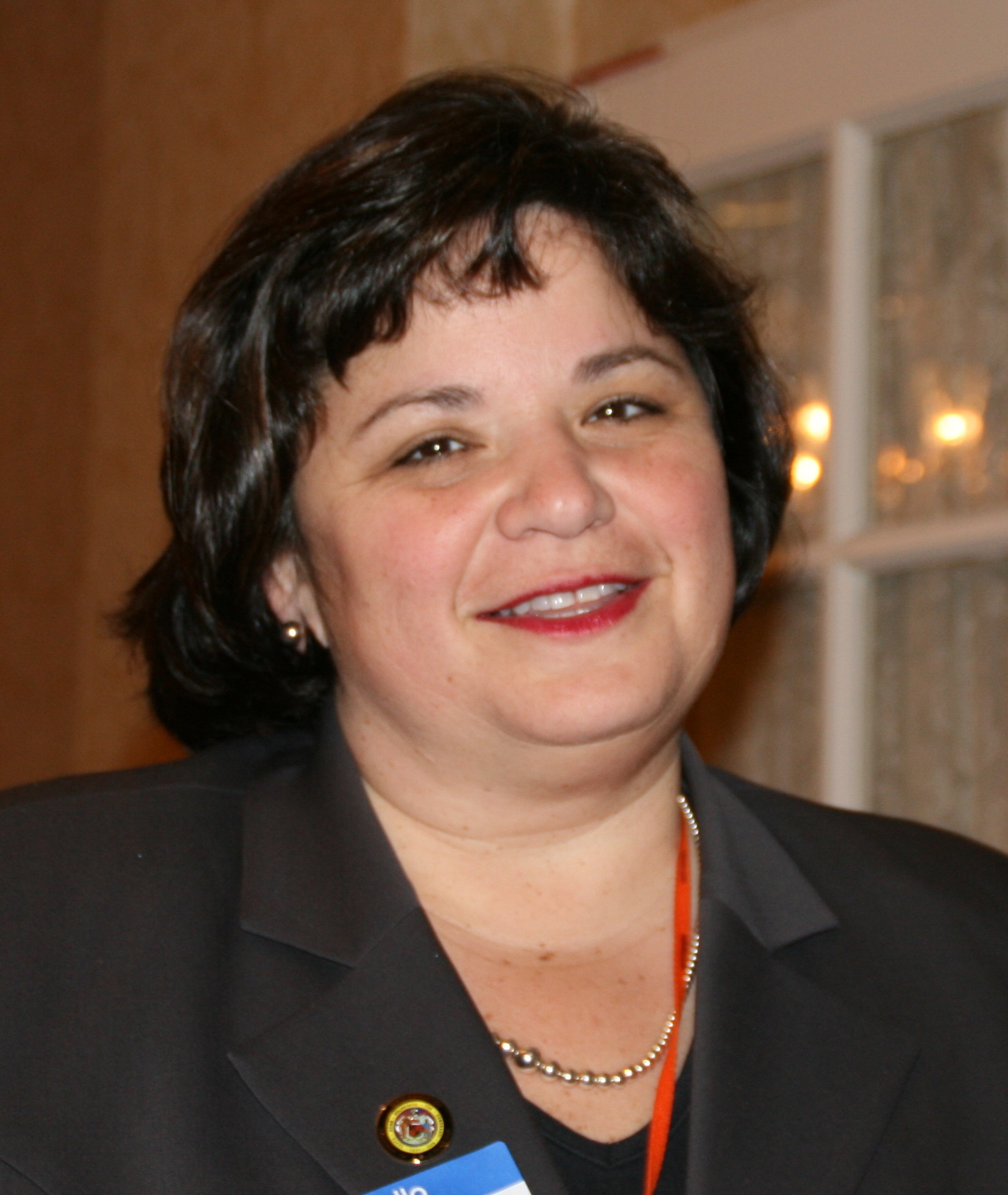

Associate Judge, Anne Arundel County Circuit Court, 5th Judicial Circuit
- Incumbent
- Assumed office February 23, 2015
- Appointed by: Martin O'Malley

Member of the Maryland House of Delegates from the 33A district
- In office January 12, 2011 – February 23, 2015
- Preceded by: James King
- Succeeded by: Michael E. Malone

Personal details
- Born: August 13, 1964 (age 62) Long Island, New York
- Party: Republican
- Spouse: Mark Muckellbauer
- Children: Mark Muckellbauer Jr.
- Education: University of Maryland, College Park; University of Baltimore School of Law
- Occupation: Lawyer
- Website: Cathy Vitale – Circuit Court Judge, Anne Arundel County, MD

Cathy Vitale (born August 13, 1964) is a Circuit Court Judge for Anne Arundel County, Maryland. A Republican, she represented District 33A in the Maryland House of Delegates from January 12, 2011, to February 23, 2015, resigning to serve on the bench.

Vitale began her public service in 1994, when she was elected to serve as a member of the Anne Arundel County Republican Central Committee. She was the chairman for the committee from 1998 to 2000.

She was the appointed to the County Council following a vacancy from the 5th District. She was then elected in her own right in 2002, and again in 2006. During her time there, she served as the council vice chair from 2008 to 2009, and as its chair in 2009.

Due to term limits, Vitale was barred from running for the county council again. Instead she ran for the open seat of District 33A, in the Maryland House of Delegates. Vitale served on the Environmental Matters Committee from 2011 to 2014 and then the Environment and Transportation Committee in 2015. She was also a member of the Anne Arundel County Delegation Committee, where she served as the subcommittee chair for Alcoholic Beverages.

She is a graduate of the University of Maryland (1985) and the University of Baltimore School of Law (1989).
