= Michael E. Malone =

American politician (born 1967)

Associate Judge, Anne Arundel County Circuit Court, 5th Judicial Circuit
- Incumbent
- Assumed office October 1, 2021
- Appointed by: Larry Hogan
- Preceded by: Laura S. Ripken

Member of the Maryland House of Delegates from the 33rd district
- In office March 16, 2015 – October 1, 2021
- Preceded by: Cathy Vitale
- Succeeded by: Rachel Muñoz

Personal details
- Born: November 14, 1967 (age 58) Steubenville, Ohio, U.S.
- Party: Republican
- Children: 4
- Education: West Virginia University (B.S., M.S.); University of Baltimore School of Law (J.D.)

Michael E. Malone (born November 14, 1967) is an American politician. He is a Republican who previously served as a member of the Maryland House of Delegates representing district 33 (Anne Arundel County) from March 2015 to October 2021. Malone resigned from the House of Delegates on October 1, 2021, after being appointed to serve as an associate judge for the Anne Arundel County Circuit Court by Governor Larry Hogan.

== Early life ==
Michael E. Malone was born in Steubenville, Ohio on November 14, 1967. He has been a resident of Anne Arundel County since his father, who attained the rank of Lieutenant Colonel in the Army, was stationed at Fort Meade. At a young age, he became an Eagle Scout by completing a project to raise funds for the Arc of Anne Arundel County. He attended West Virginia University, earning a B.S. degree in accounting in 1988 and a M.S. in industrial and labor relations in 1989. He also attended the University of Baltimore School of Law, earning a J.D. in 1992.

== Career ==
Malone has been a member of the Maryland Bar since 1992. He has been active in the legal field since college, interning for federal judge Herbert Murry and the Maryland Attorney General's Office. He also completed a clerkship for Anne Arundel Circuit Court judge Marvin Kamenetz. Malone runs his own law firm that specializes in family law and general litigation. He also worked as an associate for the Law Office of Robert J. Fuoco from 1993 to 2007.

In 2002, Malone was defeated in his run for the Anne Arundel County Council in 2002, but was elected to the Anne Arundel County Republican Central Committee, where he worked until 2006. In 2004, he was an at-large delegate at the Republican Party National Convention. In 2011, he was appointed to the Anne Arundel County Board of Elections and served until 2015.

== Maryland Legislature ==
Malone was appointed to the House of Delegates following the resignation of Cathy Vitale, who stepped down after Governor Hogan appointed her to serve as an Associate Judge on the Anne Arundel County Circuit Court.

In February 2017, Malone introduced House Bill 881, which would re-instate the death penalty in Maryland in limited circumstances. The bill died in the House Judiciary Committee after receiving an unfavorable report.

In June 2018, Maryland Matters listed Malone as one of the ten most vulnerable House incumbents in the June 2018 General Assembly primaries. Malone survived his primary with 20.2% of the vote, and was re-elected with 18.1% of the vote in the general election.

In January 2019, following the 2018–2019 partial government shutdown, Malone joined a group of 54 bipartisan Maryland lawmakers in signing a letter requesting the state send some money back to nonprofits that supported unpaid federal workers and contractors.

Prior to joining the House of Delegates, Malone was an anti-gerrymandering activist. In February 2019, Malone introduced House Bill 463, which would have placed a referendum on ballots in the 2020 United States elections that, if approved, would add an amendment to the Maryland Constitution requiring future legislatures to adhere to the same standards when drawing congressional districts that the Maryland Constitution requires of state legislative districts. His bill had 64 cosponsors, but died in the House Rules and Executive Nominations Committee. In March 2020, Malone reintroduced the bill with 64 cosponsors; his bill once again died in the House Rules and Executive Nominations Committee after receiving an unfavorable report.

In April 2021, Malone was appointed to serve as the Minority Parliamentarian in the House Republican Caucus.

== Personal life ==
Malone is married, and has four children.

== Electoral history ==
Maryland House of Delegates 33rd District Republican Primary Election, 2018
Party	Candidate	Votes	%
Republican	Sid Saab	6,799	27
Republican	Michael Malone	5,145	20
Republican	Tony McConkey	4,249	17
Republican	Stacie MacDonald	3,925	15
Republican	Jerry Walker	3,304	13
Republican	Tom Angelis	1,214	5
Republican	Connor McCoy	798	3

Maryland House of Delegates 4th District General Election, 2018
Party	Candidate	Votes	%
Republican	Michael Malone	31,581	18
Republican	Sid Saab	28,837	17
Democratic	Heather Bagnall	28,138	16
Republican	Tony McConkey	27,953	16
Democratic	Pam Luby	27,827	16
Democratic	Tracie Cramer Hovermale	26,675	15
Green	Liv Romano	3,083	2
Other/Write-Ins	Other/Write-Ins	174	0
