= Stuart Schmidt Jr. =

American politician

Stuart Schmidt, Jr.
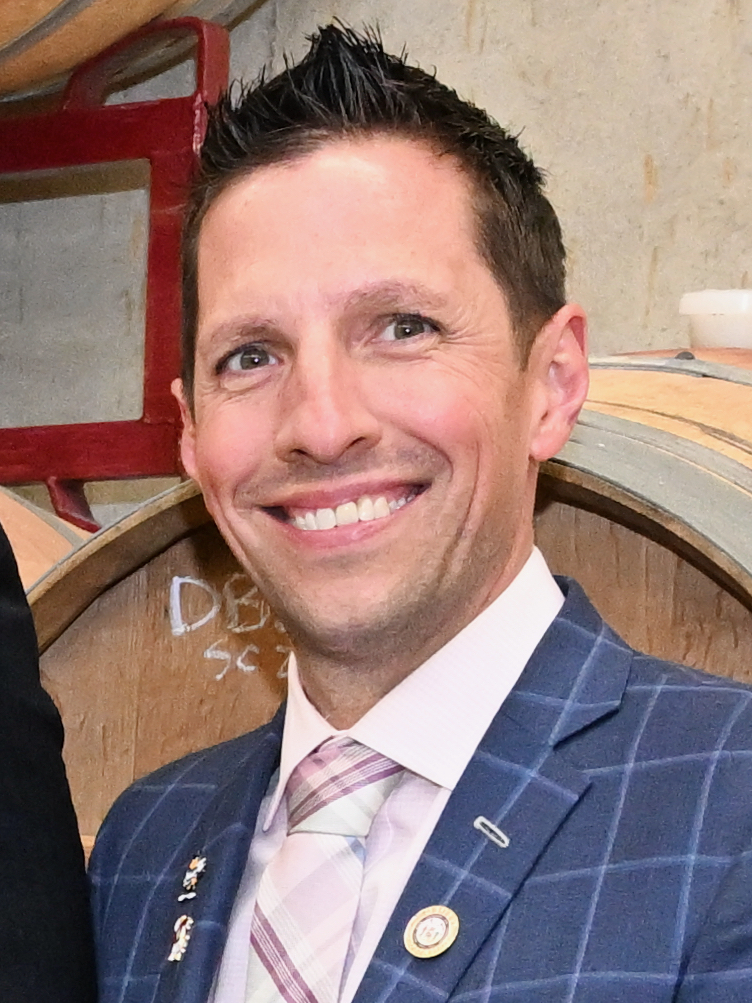

Member of the Maryland House of Delegates from the 33B district
- Incumbent
- Assumed office January 11, 2023
- Preceded by: Redistricting

Personal details
- Born: Anne Arundel County, Maryland, U.S.
- Party: Republican
- Spouse: Michelle
- Children: 1
- Education: Salisbury University (BS); University of Baltimore (MBA)
- Occupation: Real estate professional
- Website: Campaign website

Stuart Michael Schmidt, Jr. is an American politician. He is a member of the Maryland House of Delegates for District 33B in Anne Arundel County, Maryland.

== Background ==
Schmidt was born in Anne Arundel County, Maryland. He grew up playing sports in the Harundale Youth Sports League and graduated from Glen Burnie High School in 1998. Schmidt later attended Salisbury University, where he earned his Bachelor's degree, and the University of Baltimore, where he received his Master of Business Administration degree. He operates his own realty business, called Schmidt Home Consultants (a Keller Williams Realty independent franchise).

In 2022, Schmidt filed to run for the Maryland House of Delegates in District 33, later being redrawn into District 33B. He won the Republican primary on July 19, 2022, receiving 70.4 percent of the vote, and later won the general election on November 8.

In October 2026, Schmidt was one of several defendants mentioned in a civil lawsuit alleging that a concealed heating oil spill in the plaintiffs' residential home caused health problems for the homeowners and their infant daughter. In the lawsuit, plaintiffs Rachel and Zachary Calvert allege that Precision Renovation & Design—a company the plaintiffs alleged was co-owned by Schmidt and his wife—performed unpermitted renovation and construction work on a property before it was sold to the Calverts, during which a "significant quantity of heating oil was spilled or otherwise removed improperly" in the process of removing a basement heating oil tank and replacing it with an electric heat pump. The Calverts say they began enduring persistent odors a few months after the tank's removal and experiencing health issues, and vacated the property in October 2025 after a contractor encountered strong petroleum odors and visibly contaminated soil after cutting into a concrete slab to add a drain to a basement bathroom. The Maryland Department of the Environment later determined that the oil tank had been improperly removed from the property, releasing heating oil onto the basement floor and allowing it to infiltrate the soil beneath the home. The Schmidts denied the allegations in the lawsuit, including that the Schmidts co-own Precision and that an oil spill occurred during the oil tank's removal.

== In the legislature ==
Schmidt was sworn into the Maryland House of Delegates on January 11, 2023. He was a member of the House Judiciary Committee.

Schmidt ran for a second term in 2026, but was defeated in the general election by Democratic challenger Chuck Cook.

== Political positions ==
In January 2026, during debate on a bill to redraw Maryland's congressional districts, Schmidt introduced an amendment to reject the proposed map, which would have redrawn Maryland's 1st congressional district to improve the Democratic Party's chances of winning it, and ban mid-decade redistricting in Maryland. The amendment was rejected in a 37–95 vote.

In February 2026, Schmidt was one of three Republicans delegates to support a bill that would prohibit investor-owned utilities from paying employee bonuses and supervisor compensation with ratepayer dollars. In March 2026, he was one of 10 Republicans to support the Utility RELIEF Act—a legislative package aimed at lowering electricity costs through a series of reforms to EmPOWER Maryland, delays to clean energy goals, and limits on what costs utility companies could pass onto consumers—though he said he believed the bill did not go far enough.

In August 2026, during debate on a proposed constitutional amendment on redistricting, Schmidt introduced an amendment that would impose a 60-day gas tax holiday.

== Personal life ==
Schmidt is married to his wife, Michele. Together, they have one child and live in Crofton, Maryland.

== Electoral history ==
Maryland House of Delegates District 33B Republican primary election, 2022
Party	Candidate	Votes	%
Republican	Stuart Michael Schmidt, Jr.	2,498	70.4
Republican	Tyler Bailey	1,050	29.6

Maryland House of Delegates District 33B election, 2022
Party	Candidate	Votes	%
Republican	Stuart Michael Schmidt, Jr.	10,501	50.66
Democratic	John Wakefield	10,204	49.23
Write-in		24	0.12
