= Dawn Gile =

American politician (born 1980)

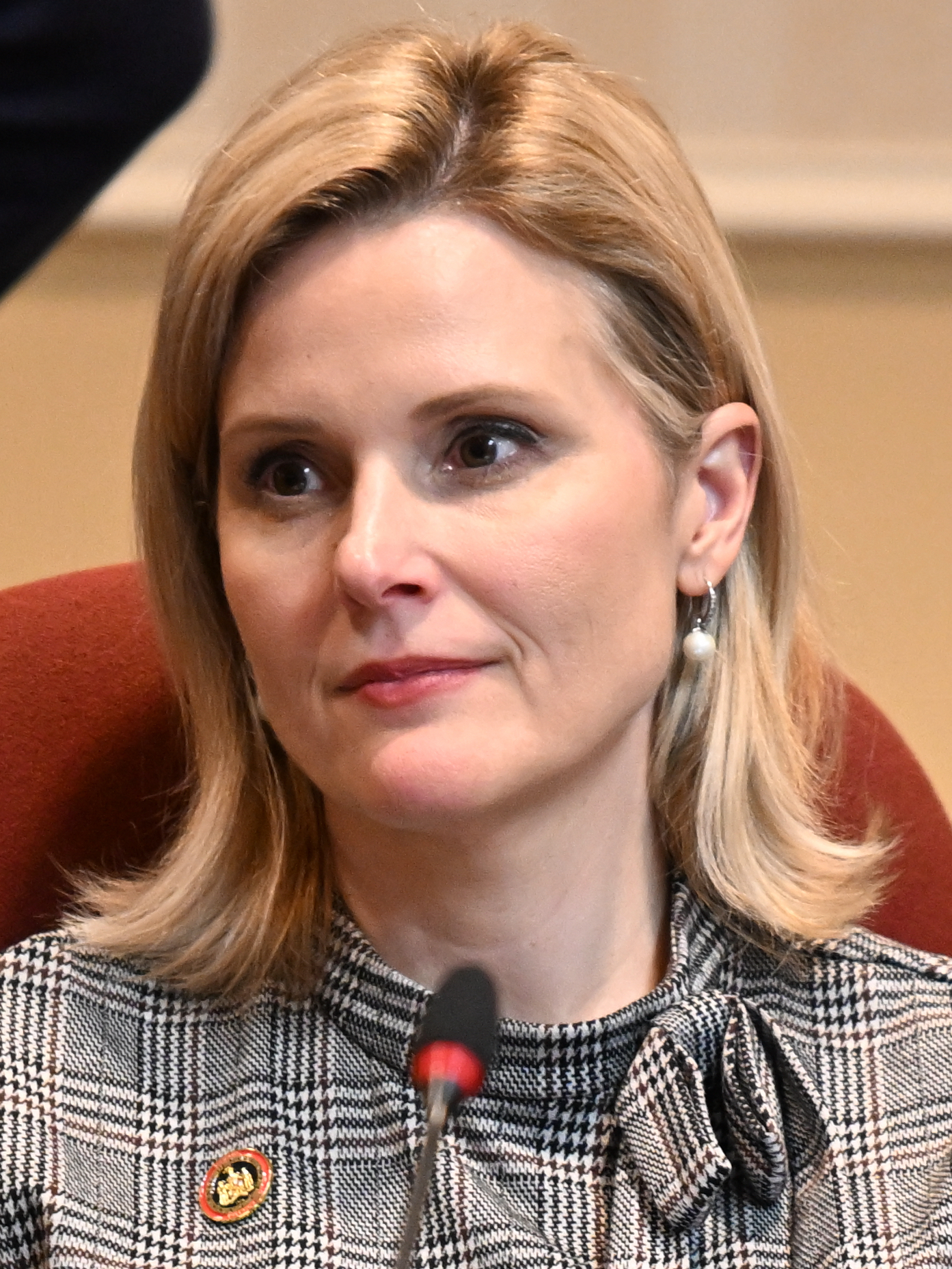

Member of the Maryland Senate from the 33rd district
- Incumbent
- Assumed office January 11, 2023
- Preceded by: Edward R. Reilly

Personal details
- Born: January 1, 1980 (age 46) Dubuque, Iowa, U.S.
- Party: Democratic
- Spouse: D.J. Gile
- Children: 3
- Education: Rockford University (BA), Loyola University Chicago School of Law (JD)
- Profession: Attorney
- Website: Campaign website

Dawn Danielle Gile (born January 1, 1980) is an American politician and attorney. She is a member of the Maryland Senate for District 33 in Anne Arundel County, Maryland.

== Background ==
Gile graduated from Rockford University with a Bachelor of Arts degree in psychology and a minor in French before getting her Juris Doctor degree from Loyola University Chicago School of Law in 2006. She worked in the Chicago area before moving to Maryland in 2007. Before becoming a state senator, she served as the president of the Military Spouse JD Network.

In July 2021, Gile filed to run for the Maryland Senate in District 33, seeking to defeat state senator Edward R. Reilly, who later announced his retirement. She won the Democratic primary unopposed, and faced Republican state delegate Sid Saab in the general election. During her campaign, she received endorsements from President of the Maryland Senate Bill Ferguson, former U.S. Senate candidate Amy McGrath, and former Deputy Secretary of the Maryland Department of Housing Ardath Cade.

In October 2022, Saab filed a $2 million defamation lawsuit against Gile, alleging that some of her campaign literature contained false information about him and his business, including the suggestion that he is under federal indictment. Gile, in a statement to Maryland Matters, called Saab's lawsuit a "distraction and a misuse of the legal system" and implied that his allegations were an act of desperation. Saab dropped the lawsuits once the election was over.

Gile defeated Saab in the general election on November 8, 2022, receiving 55.41 percent of the vote to Saab's 44.48 percent. She is the first Democrat to win the state Senate seat in 50 years and the first Democrat to hold the office since Robert R. Neall.

== In the legislature ==
Gile was sworn into the Maryland Senate on January 11, 2023. Gile served as a member of the Finance Committee from 2023 to 2027, afterwards becoming the chair of the Senate Education, Energy, and the Environment Committee.

== Political positions ==
Gile has been described as a moderate.

=== Education ===
Gile supports the Blueprint for Maryland's Future, a sweeping education reform bill passed by the legislature during the 2020 legislative session that would provide schools with $3.8 billion a year for 10 years. In January 2022, she called the Blueprint bill a "wonderful piece of legislation" but said that it did not address all the issues facing students and staff in public schools.

=== Environment ===
Gile supports efforts to clean up pollution and runoff in the Chesapeake Bay and the Severn River. In January 2022, she said she supports smart development and sustainable agricultural practices to protect local ecosystems, specifically adding that she supports providing farmers with support to reduce nitrogen and phosphorus runoff from chicken farms.

=== Redistricting ===
In February 2026, Gile said she opposed pursuing mid-decade redistricting in Maryland and opposed holding a vote on a bill that would redraw Maryland's congressional districts to improve the Democratic Party's chances of winning the 1st congressional district, the only congressional district held by Republicans in the state.

=== Social issues ===
During her state senate campaign, Gile sought to capitalize on the issue of abortion rights following the Supreme Court's decision in Dobbs v. Jackson Women's Health Organization. During the 2023 legislative session, Gile defended a bill in the Maryland Senate that would create a 2024 referendum on codifying the right to abortion access into the Constitution of Maryland. During the 2026 legislative session, she introduced a bill that would require insurers to cover evaluation and treatment of perimenopause and menopause symptoms.

=== Taxes ===
Gile supports closing loopholes in Maryland's tax code. She also supports making military retiree pay exempt from state taxes.

In March 2023, Gile was one of five Democrats to vote for an amendment that would have decoupled the state's fuel taxes from inflation.

During the 2026 legislative session, Gile introduced a bill to impose a two-year pause on the collection of the tax on hospitals' captive insurance policies to allow the state to study the tax. The bill was introduced following a whistleblower report, which alleged that Maryland hospitals were setting up for-profit insurance companies in places such as the Cayman Islands to avoid paying the state's 3% premium tax. The two-year pause was removed from the bill by the Maryland House of Delegates, after which it passed both chambers.

== Personal life ==
Gile is a military spouse, with her husband, SGM (ret.) D.J. Gile, serving in the military for 24 years. Together, they have three daughters and live in Severna Park, Maryland.

== Electoral history ==
Maryland Senate District 33 Democratic primary election, 2022
Party	Candidate	Votes	%
Democratic	Dawn D. Gile	10,881	100.00

Maryland Senate District 33 election, 2022
Party	Candidate	Votes	%
Democratic	Dawn D. Gile	30,807	55.41
Republican	Sid Saab	24,730	44.48
Write-in		60	0.11
