= Heather Bagnall =

American politician (born 1974)

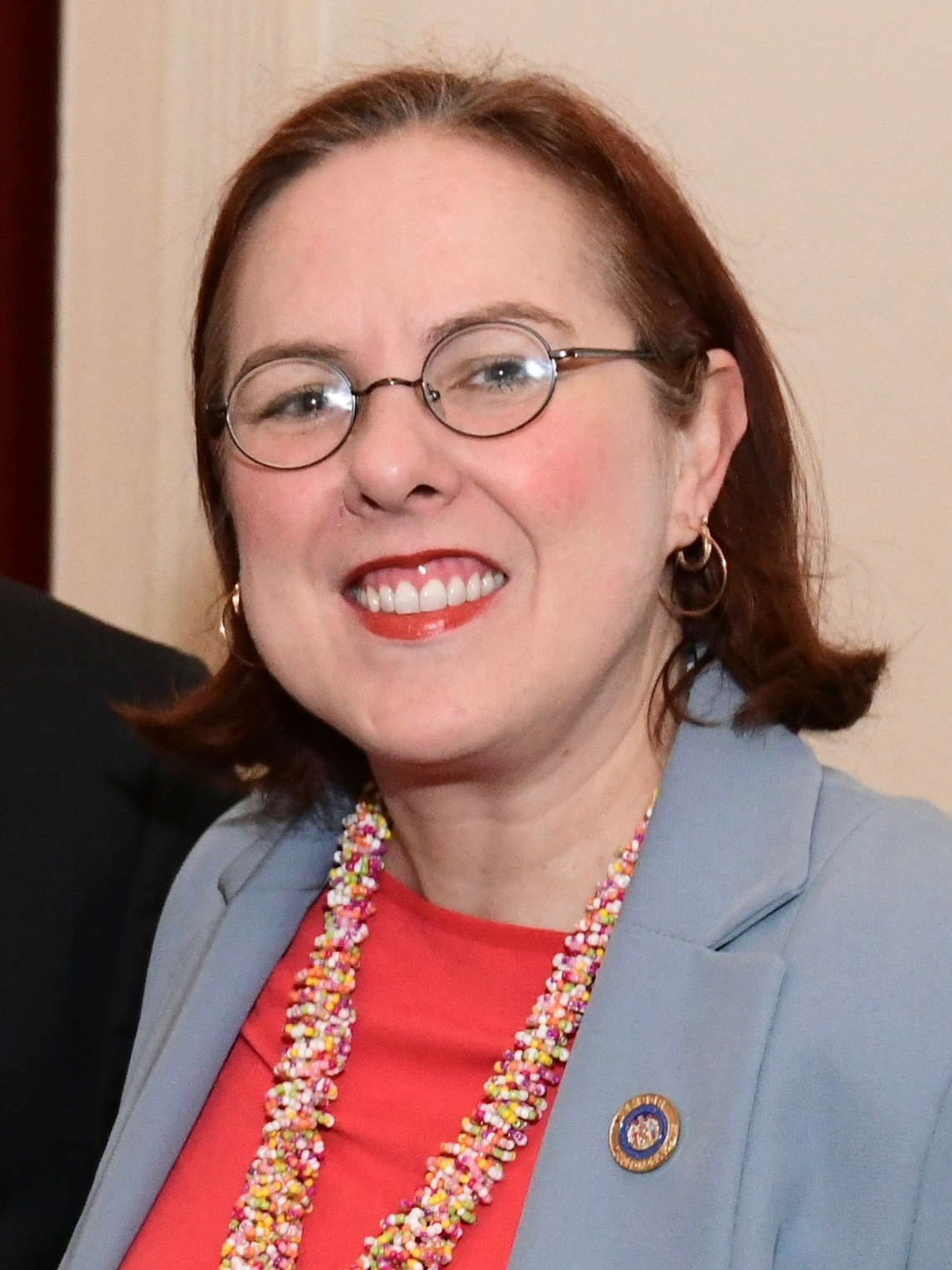
- Bagnall in 2019

Member of the Maryland House of Delegates
- Incumbent
- Assumed office January 9, 2019
- Preceded by: Tony McConkey
- Constituency: 33rd district (2019–2023); District 33C (2023–present)

Personal details
- Born: January 17, 1974 (age 52) Washington, D.C., U.S.
- Party: Democratic
- Spouse: Luke Nicholas Dillon-Tudball
- Education: Wagner College
- Alma mater: Towson University (BS)

Heather Alice Bagnall Tudball (born January 17, 1974) is an American politician from the Democratic Party and is a member of the Maryland House of Delegates representing parts of Anne Arundel County. She represented the 33rd district from 2019 to 2023, afterward being redrawn into District 33C.

== Early life and career ==
Bagnall was born in Washington, D.C. She graduated from Broadneck High School and attended Wagner College and Towson University, where she received a Bachelor of Science degree in theatre performances. She later attended additional studies at The Second City in Chicago.

After graduating from Towson, Bagnall worked as an arts educator at the Holton-Arms School. She also worked as a playwright and staff member for the Disney Cruise Line. In 2011, Bagnall founded Tasty Monster Productions with her partner, Luke Tudball, whom she had met while overseas.

== In the legislature ==
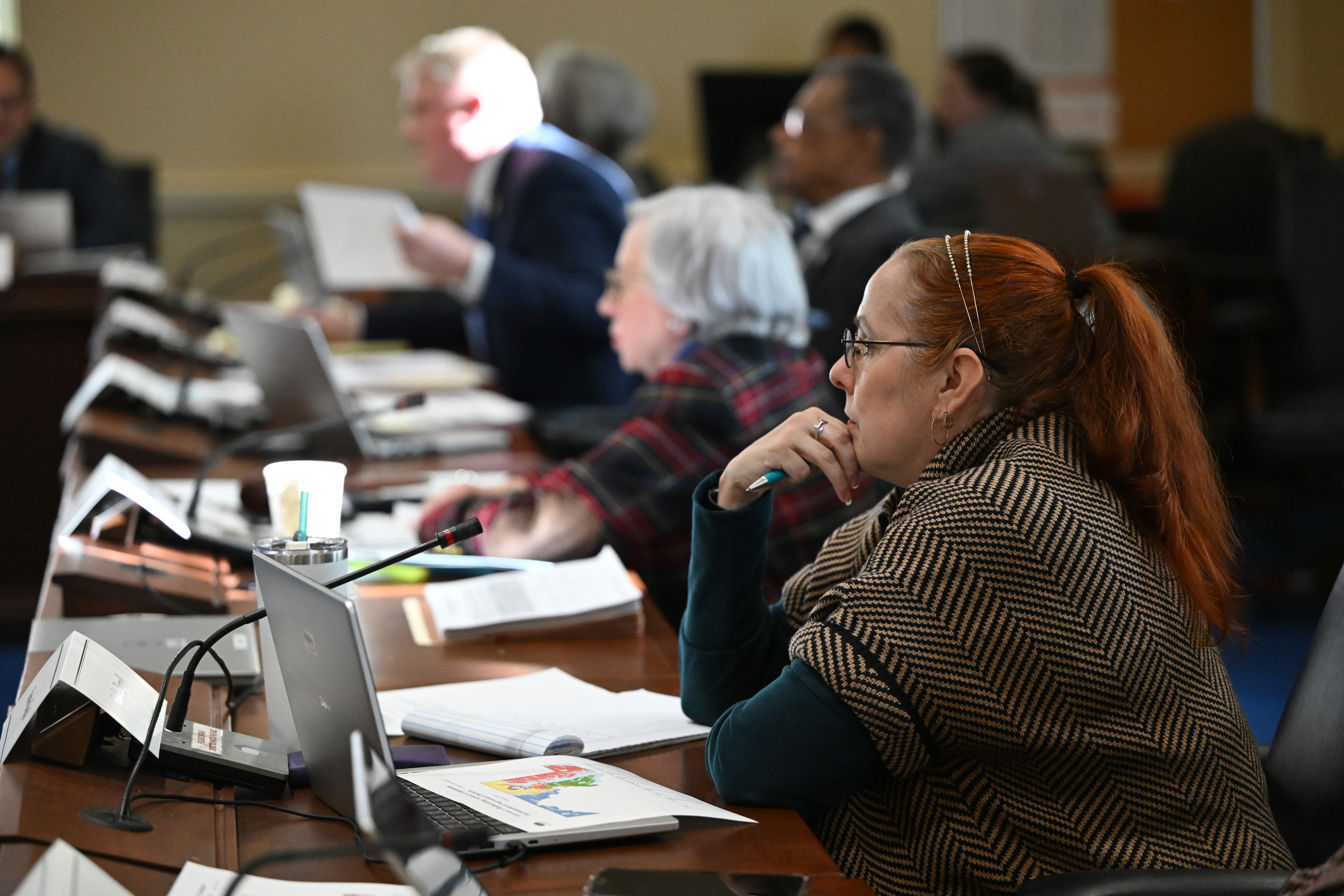
Bagnall in the House Rules Committee, 2026

In February 2018, Bagnall announced that she would run for the Maryland Senate in District 33, challenging incumbent state senator Edward R. Reilly. She later withdrew her candidacy and instead ran for the Maryland House of Delegates. Bagnall won the general election in an upset on November 6, 2018, placing third and edging out incumbent state delegate Tony McConkey by a margin of 185 votes. She is the first Democrat and the first woman to represent District 33 in the Maryland General Assembly since the retirement of state delegate Marsha G. Perry in 1998.

Bagnall was sworn in on January 9, 2019. She is a member of the Health Committee, becoming its chair in December 2025.

== Political positions ==
=== Environment ===
During the 2021 legislative session, Bagnall introduced legislation that would prohibit landowners from losing riparian rights because of erosion or sea-level rise.

=== Health care ===
During the 2019 legislative session, Bagnall introduced legislation to prohibit non-consensual pelvic or rectal exams on unconscious patients. The bill passed and was signed into law by Governor Larry Hogan.

During the 2021 legislative session, Bagnall supported a bill that would allow minors 12-years-old and older to seek mental health care without parental consent. The bill passed and became law without Governor Hogan's signature. In 2023, Bagnall introduced a bill requiring the Maryland Department of Health to cover the cost of certain at-home therapies for children facing complex mental health issues. The bill passed and was signed into law by Governor Wes Moore. She also supported legislation to allow organizations to manage overdose prevention sites.

=== Social issues ===
In May 2019, Bagnall attended a rally in Annapolis to protest against heartbeat bills, which ban abortions as soon as a fetal heartbeat is detected.

In June 2020, Bagnall participated in a George Floyd protest in Annapolis.

During the 2025 legislative session, Bagnall introduced a resolution to exonerate seven individuals accused of witchcraft in Colonial Maryland. In an interview with The New York Times, Bagnall said that she was motivated to introduce the resolution as a result of the U.S. Supreme Court's ruling in Dobbs v. Jackson Women's Health Organization and the subsequent passage of anti-abortion laws in red states, as well as campaigns against transgender rights and diversity, equity, and inclusion initiatives.

=== Taxes ===
In February 2020, Bagnall was the only Democrat to vote for an Anne Arundel County bill that would have withheld tax refunds from individuals with outstanding warrants.

== Personal life ==
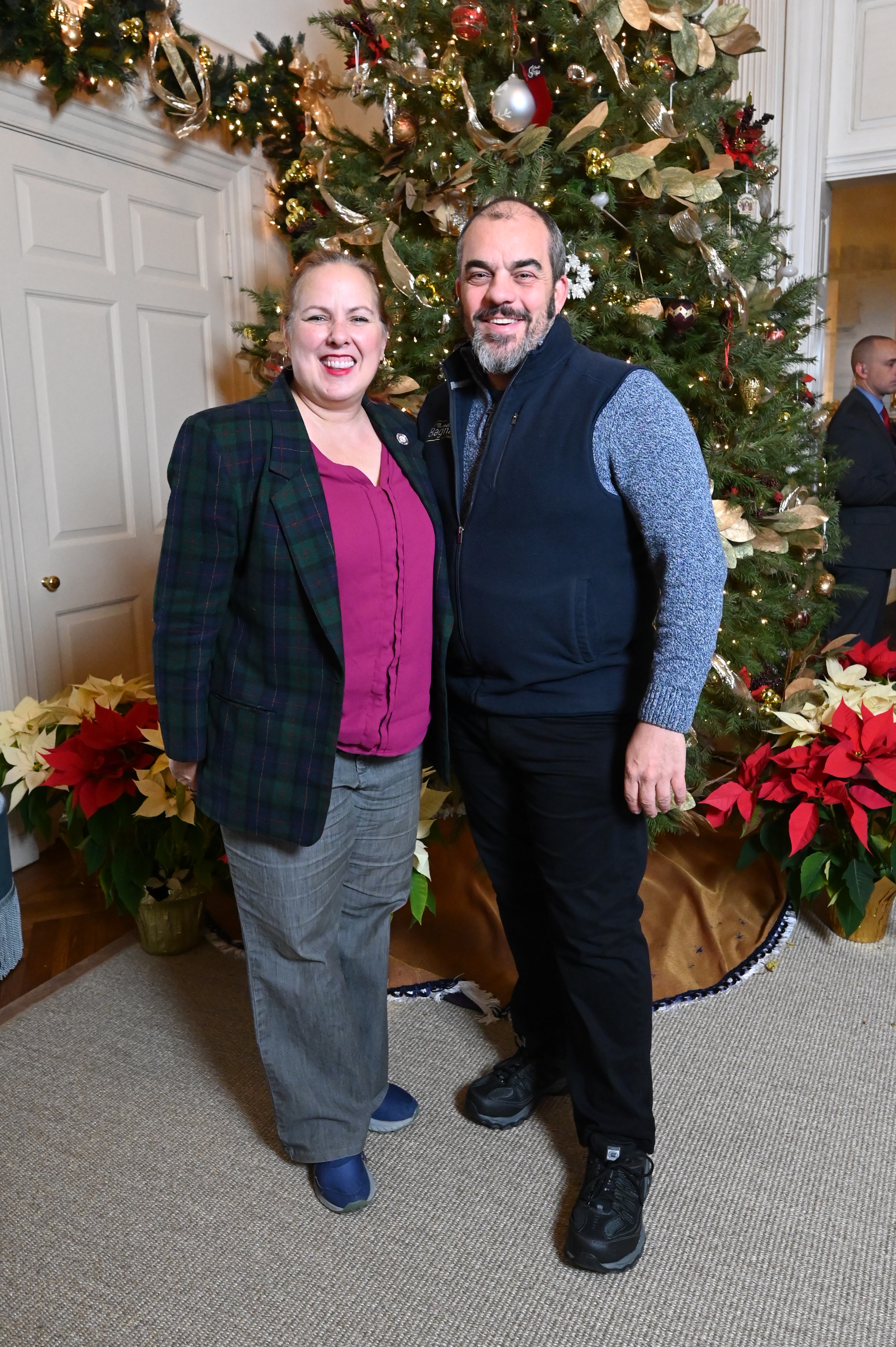
Bagnall and her husband Luke at a Government House holiday reception, 2024

Bagnall is married to her husband, Luke Nicholas Dillon-Tudball.

In June 2018, following the Capital Gazette shooting, Bagnall's brother, Jason, became distraught and began ranting about communism, conspiracy theories, and mass shootings. Heather tried to de-escalate the situation when she saw Jason sitting on the edge of his bathtub with a sawed-off shotgun, telling her to leave. She left the house and met up with her father at a nearby shopping center, from where they called 9-1-1. Heather later filed for a protective order against Jason, who was charged with second-degree assault in connection with the incident. During Jason's trial in April 2019, Heather testified that he had threatened her, but not with a gun pointed at her as the police report alleged, and said that the family hoped to get Jason help with what they believed was an undiagnosed mental health condition. The sentencing phase of Jason's trial ended in a hung jury, prompting the judge to declare a mistrial.

== Electoral history ==
Maryland House of Delegates District 33 Democratic primary election, 2018
Party	Candidate	Votes	%
Democratic	Heather Bagnall	8,133	33.7
Democratic	Pam Luby	8,078	33.5
Democratic	Tracie Cramer Hovermale	7,938	32.9

Maryland House of Delegates District 33 election, 2018
Party	Candidate	Votes	%
Republican	Michael E. Malone (incumbent)	31,581	18.1
Republican	Sid Saab (incumbent)	28,837	16.5
Democratic	Heather Bagnall	28,138	16.1
Republican	Tony McConkey (incumbent)	27,953	16.0
Democratic	Pam Luby	27,827	16.0
Democratic	Tracie Cramer Hovermale	26,675	15.3
Green	Liv Romano	3,083	1.8
Write-in		174	0.1

Maryland House of Delegates District 33C election, 2022
Party	Candidate	Votes	%
Democratic	Heather Bagnall (incumbent)	10,860	54.1
Republican	Kerry A. Gillespie	9,210	45.8
Write-in		20	0.1
