= Edward R. Reilly =

American politician

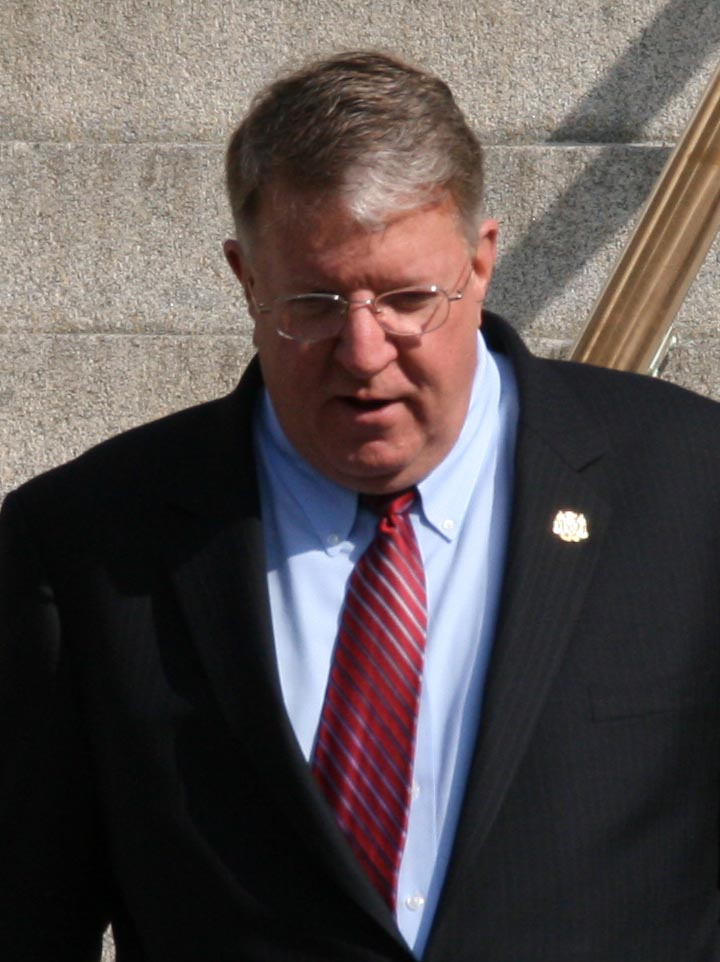
- Reilly in 2011

Member of the Maryland Senate from the 33rd district
- In office June 22, 2009 – January 11, 2023
- Appointed by: Martin O'Malley
- Preceded by: Janet Greenip
- Succeeded by: Dawn Gile
- Constituency: Anne Arundel County, Maryland

Anne Arundel County Council District 7
- In office December 4, 2002 – 2009

Personal details
- Born: November 28, 1949 (age 76) Glen Ridge, New Jersey, U.S.
- Party: Republican
- Spouse: Cathy Reilly
- Children: 4
- Education: Iona College (BBA)
- Profession: Insurance Agency Owner

Edward R. Reilly (born November 28, 1949) is an American politician. He was a Republican member of the Maryland Senate, appointed by Governor Martin O'Malley to represent District 33 after State Senator Janet Greenip resigned. He then ran and was elected in November 2010 to his first full term.

== Background ==
Reilly graduated from Essex Catholic High School in Newark, New Jersey. Reilly later received his Bachelor of Business Administration in banking and finance in 1972 from Iona College in New Rochelle, New York.

Reilly has been a member of the U.S. Jaycees since 1974 and was president of the Park-Adelphi Jaycees from 1976 to 1977 and is a past-president of College Park Jaycees. He is also a volunteer for the American Cancer Society, and a past-president of the Anne Arundel County Life Underwriters Association. Reilly is a Nationwide Insurance representative and owns his own insurance agency in Crofton, Maryland.

Reilly served on the Anne Arundel County Council representing District 7 from December 2002 to June 2009.

== In the legislature ==
Reilly was selected by the Anne Arundel County Republican Central Committee to replace the retiring Janet Greenip who retired mid-term. He was sworn into the Maryland Senate on June 22, 2009. In 2021, he was elected to serve as the Deputy Minority Leader of the Maryland Senate.

In 2022, the Maryland General Assembly's Joint Committee on Legislative Ethics found that Reilly broke with the standards of the body after he told a constituent he planned to pull a bill they both worked on because she donated to his opponent's campaign.

Despite initially filing to run for re-election, Reilly announced he would not seek re-election to the Maryland Senate on April 18, 2022.

== Political positions ==
=== Environment ===
In 2017, Reilly voted to uphold Governor Larry Hogan's veto of a bill to increase the use of renewable energy in Maryland, saying the bill would levy a "hidden tax" on consumers.

In 2021, Reilly was one of two Republican state Senators to vote in favor of the Climate Solutions Now Act of 2021, a bill that aimed to cut Maryland's greenhouse gas emissions by 60 percent by 2030.

=== Marijuana ===
Reilly identifies as an "advocate of medical marijuana". During the 2012 legislative session, he introduced legislation to ban synthetic marijuana. In 2015, Reilly was one of three Republican members of the Maryland General Assembly to vote for a bill to decriminalize marijuana possession.

=== Minimum wage ===
During a debate on legislation to raise Maryland's minimum wage to $10.10 an hour by 2018, Reilly introduced three amendments, including one that would have raised the minimum wage just once to $9 an hour in July 2015. All three amendments were rejected.

=== Policing ===
Reilly was the only Republican to vote in favor of the Police Reform and Accountability Act of 2021.

=== Redistricting ===
During the 2019 legislative session, Reilly introduced legislation that call for a ballot initiative that, if approved, would require the state's congressional districts to be drawn with respect to the boundaries, compactness, and commonality of populations. During the 2021 special legislative session, he introduced an amendment to the state's new congressional redistricting plan that would exchange the maps, drawn by the Legislative Redistricting Advisory Commission, with ones drawn by the Maryland Citizens Redistricting Commission. The amendment was rejected by a vote of 15-32. In 2022, Reilly introduced an amendment to the state's legislative redistricting plan to again swap out the LRAC-drawn maps with those proposed by the MCRC, which was rejected by a 14-32 vote. He later voted against the legislative maps.

=== Social issues ===
During a debate on legislation to legalize same-sex marriage in Maryland, Reilly introduced an amendment to change the bill's effective date from October to January 2013, which did not receive a vote. He later motioned to delay the bill to gain more time to prepare amendments. In 2015, Reilly voted against legislation that would allow transgender people to change the gender on their birth certificates.

In 2013, Reilly was one of two Republicans to vote in favor of a bill to repeal the death penalty in Maryland.

In 2014, Reilly voted against legislation to outlaw grain alcohol in Maryland, suggesting that the state should work on alcohol education instead of restricting sales of booze.

During the 2021 legislative session, Reilly introduced a resolution calling for "female monthly cycle tracking for adolescent girls" to be added to school health curriculum, which was met with criticism from reproductive health activists who called the proposal invasive and inappropriate. He later withdrew the resolution.

== Legacy ==
The nine-mile portion of Maryland Route 450 from Crofton to Annapolis known as Defense Highway was officially renamed after Reilly on October 25, 2023. Reilly worked on solutions to flooding along the road in 2018 and 2019.

== Electoral history ==
Anne Arundel County Council District 7 General Election, 2002
Party	Candidate	Votes	%
Republican	Edward R. Reilly	16,098	
Democratic	Bill Rinehart	11,936	

Anne Arundel County Council District 7 General Election, 2006
Party	Candidate	Votes	%
Republican	Edward R. Reilly	17,254	58.3
Democratic	Eric Lipsetts	9,934	33.6
Green	Robb Tufts	2,375	8.0

Maryland Senate District 33 Republican Primary Election, 2010
Party	Candidate	Votes	%
Republican	Edward R. Reilly	6,838	51.9
Republican	James J. King	5,458	41.4
Republican	Brian Benjers	886	6.7

Maryland Senate District 33 General Election, 2010
Party	Candidate	Votes	%
Republican	Edward R. Reilly	43,500	98.3
Write-In		763	1.7

Maryland Senate District 33 General Election, 2014
Party	Candidate	Votes	%
Republican	Edward R. Reilly	41,745	98.0
Write-In		845	2.0

Maryland Senate District 33 General Election, 2018
Party	Candidate	Votes	%
Republican	Edward R. Reilly	34,884	53.5
Democratic	Eve Hurwitz	30,298	46.4
Write-In		51	0.1
