= Robert A. Costa =

American politician (born 1958)

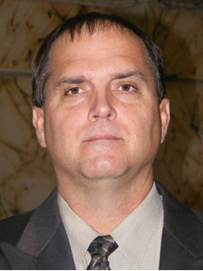

Member of the Maryland House of Delegates from the 33rd district
- In office January 8, 2003 – January 13, 2015
- Preceded by: Robert C. Baldwin
- Succeeded by: Sid Saab

Personal details
- Born: October 9, 1958 (age 67) Linthicum, Maryland, U.S.
- Party: Republican
- Education: Anne Arundel Community College
- Military career
- Allegiance: United States
- Branch: United States Army
- Service years: 1981–1985

Robert A. Costa (born October 9, 1958) is an American politician who was a member of the Maryland House of Delegates, and, until his retirement, represented District 33B, which is located in Anne Arundel County. He defeated Democrat Mike Shay in the 2006 election. In 2002, he defeated Democrat Dotty Chaney to initially capture the seat of this newly created district. He announced his retirement in 2014. He was succeeded by Sid Saab.

== Early life ==
Costa was born on October 9, 1958, in Linthicum, Maryland. Costa attended Annapolis High School in Annapolis, Maryland. After high school, he attended Anne Arundel Community College, focusing on general studies.

== Career ==
Prior to becoming an elected official, Costa served in the United States Army from 1981 until 1985. After his service in the military, Costa became a professional firefighter with the Anne Arundel County Fire Department. He has also spent some time as a real estate agent.

Costa has been an active member in several organizations. He is on the executive board of Local 1563, the Anne Arundel County Professional Firefighters Association. He was a member Anne Arundel County Republican Central Committee from 1998–2002, serving as its chair from 1999 until 2000. Costa is the founder of the South County Republican Dinner Club. He is also a member of the Italian Businessmen's Association in Annapolis, the South County Moose Lodge, the Deale Elk's Lodge, Deale Elementary School P.T.A., the Alliance of the Chesapeake, the National Rifle Association of America (NRA), and the Maryland Rifle and Pistol Association. He is also a member of the Arbor Day Foundation, Citizens for a Sound Economy, and the Anne Arundel Affordable Housing Coalition. Finally, he served as the chair of the Board of Directors of the Avalon Shores Civic Association from 1999 until 2001.

Costa has received numerous awards for his service including the Outstanding Patriotism Award, Annapolis Chapter, Military Order of World Wars in 1983 and the Outstanding Legislative Leadership Award, ARC of Maryland and Maryland Association of Community Services in 2005.

While working for the House of Delegates, Costa has been selected as a member of the Health and Government Operations Committee and the Investigation Committee. He served as Deputy Minority Whip from 2003 to 2005.

=== Legislative notes ===
- voted against the Clean Indoor Air Act of 2007 (HB359)
- voted for the Healthy Air Act in 2006(SB154)
- voted for slots in 2005 (HB1361)
- voted against in-state tuition for undocumented immigrants in 2007 (HB6)
- On February 17, 2012, Costa was one of two Republicans (the other being Delegate Wade Kach of Baltimore) to vote in favor of the Civil Marriage Protection Act, a bill allowing same-sex couples to obtain a marriage license. The bill passed 72-67. The bill needed 71 votes to pass. (HB438)

== Election results ==
- 2006 Race for Maryland House of Delegates – 33rd District, Division B

Voters to choose one:

Name	Votes	Percent	Outcome
Robert A. Costa, Rep.	10,484	58.1%	Won
Mike Shay, Dem.	7,568	41.9%	Lost
Other Write-Ins	7	0.0%	
