= James King (Maryland politician) =

American politician

James J. King
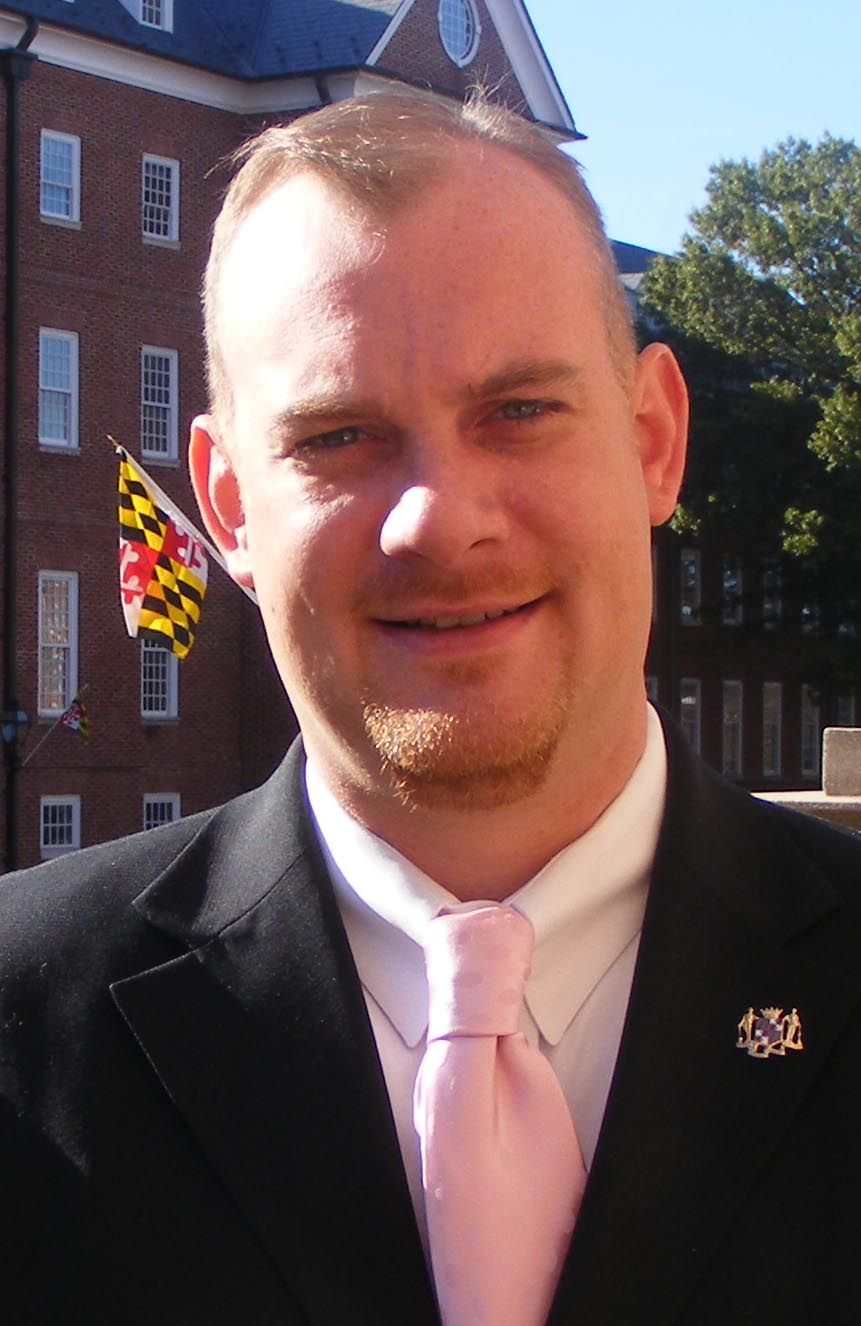

Member of the Maryland House of Delegates from the 33A district
- In office January 10, 2007 – January 12, 2011

Personal details
- Born: August 23, 1974 (age 51) Washington, D.C., US
- Party: Republican

James Joseph King (born August 23, 1974) is a politician and former member of the Republican Party in the U.S. State of Maryland. He represented district 33A in Anne Arundel County in the Maryland House of Delegates.

== Election results ==
=== 2006 ===
Voters to choose two:

Maryland House of Delegates – 33rd District, Division A, 2006
Party	Candidate	Votes	%
Republican	James King	18,542	29.0
Republican	Tony McConkey	16,655	26.0
Democratic	Patricia Weathersbee	15,226	23.8
Democratic	Paul G. Rudolph	13,461	21.0
Write-in		73	0.1
