= Maryland Legislative District 33 =

American legislative district

Maryland's legislative district 33
- Represents part of Anne Arundel County
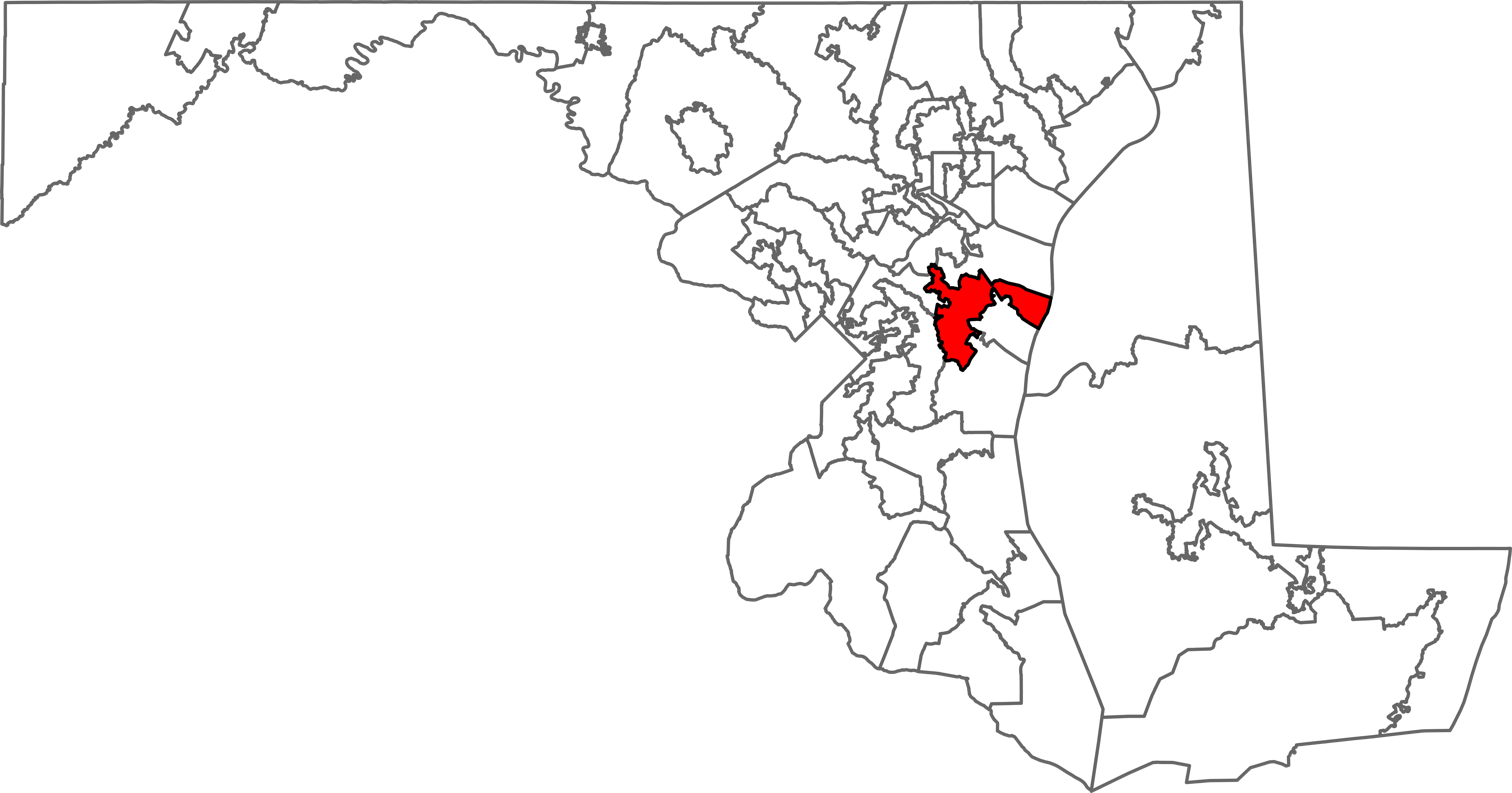
- Senator: Dawn Gile (D)
- Delegate(s): Andrew Pruski (D) (District 33A); Stuart Schmidt Jr. (R) (District 33B); Heather Bagnall (D) (District 33C)
- Registration: 38.1% Republican; 38.1% Democratic; 22.6% unaffiliated
- Demographics: 76.7% White; 8.2% Black/African American; 0.2% Native American; 4.3% Asian; 0.1% Hawaiian/Pacific Islander; 2.1% Other race; 8.4% Two or more races; 6.2% Hispanic
- Population (2020): 141,096
- Voting-age population: 106,510
- Registered voters: 106,540

Maryland Legislative District 33 is one of 47 districts in the state for the Maryland General Assembly. It covers part of Anne Arundel County.

== Demographic characteristics ==
As of the 2020 United States census, the district had a population of 141,096, of whom 106,510 (75.5%) were of voting age. The racial makeup of the district was 108,276 (76.7%) White, 11,574 (8.2%) African American, 333 (0.2%) Native American, 6,011 (4.3%) Asian, 99 (0.1%) Pacific Islander, 2,952 (2.1%) from some other race, and 11,879 (8.4%) from two or more races. Hispanic or Latino of any race were 8,717 (6.2%) of the population.

The district had 106,540 registered voters as of October 17, 2020, of whom 24,083 (22.6%) were registered as unaffiliated, 40,568 (38.1%) were registered as Republicans, 40,544 (38.1%) were registered as Democrats, and 601 (0.6%) were registered to other parties.

== Political representation ==
The district is represented for the 2023–2027 legislative term in the State Senate by Dawn Gile (D) and in the House of Delegates by Andrew Pruski (D. District 33A), Stuart Schmidt Jr. (R, District 33B) and Heather Bagnall (D, District 33C).

== History ==
Prior to 2014, the district was bifurcated into two districts: District 33A and District 33B.

== Election results ==
=== House of Delegates ===
2006 Race for Maryland House of Delegates – 33A Voters to choose two:
Name	Votes	Percent	Outcome
James King, Rep.	18,542	29.0%	Won
Tony McConkey, Rep.	16,655	26.0%	Won
Patricia Weathersbee, Dem.	15,226	23.8%	Lost
Paul G. Rudolph, Dem.	13,461	21.0%	Lost
Other Write-Ins	73	0.1%	

2006 Race for Maryland House of Delegates – 33B Voters to choose one:
Name	Votes	Percent	Outcome
Robert A. Costa, Rep.	10,484	58.1%	Won
Mike Shay, Dem.	7,568	41.9%	Lost
Other Write-Ins	7	0.0%	
