= Tony McConkey =

American politician

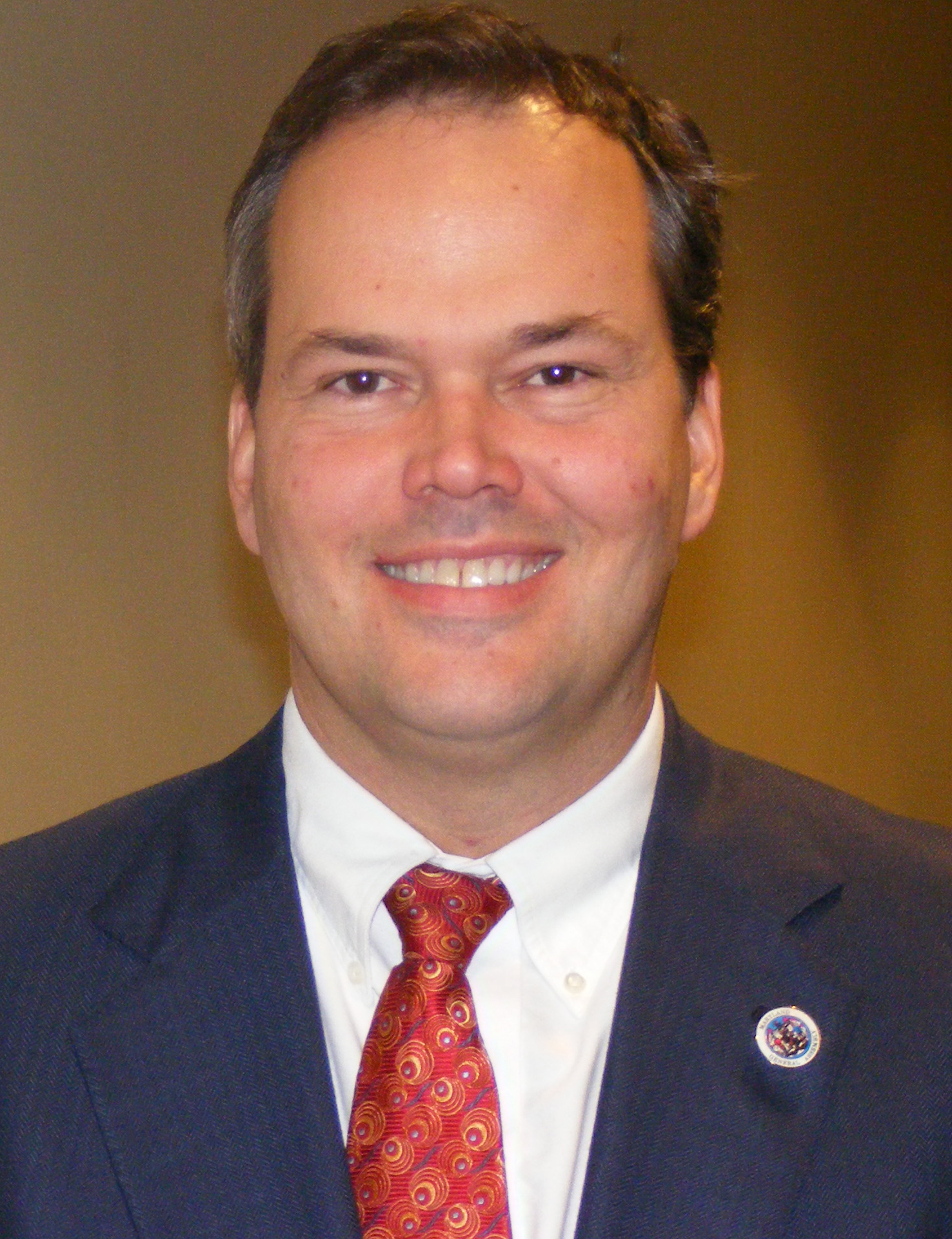

Member of the Maryland House of Delegates from the 33A district
- In office January 8, 2003 – January 9, 2019
- Preceded by: Janet Greenip
- Succeeded by: Heather Bagnall

Personal details
- Born: November 21, 1963 (age 62) Cheverly, Maryland
- Party: Republican
- Education: University of Maryland, College Park (BA, BS); University of Maryland, Baltimore (JD)

Tony McConkey (born November 21, 1963) is a former elected official in the Maryland House of Delegates. He was first elected in 2002, taking the seat of former Delegate Janet Greenip, who ran for a State Senate seat. He served in District 33, which is located in Anne Arundel County, Maryland. He lost a bid for re-election in 2018 to Democratic challenger Heather Bagnall.

== Early years/education ==
Born in Cheverly, Maryland, he graduated in 1986 from the University of Maryland, College Park with a joint B.A. (government & politics) and B.S. (business management) degree. He attended the University of Maryland School of Law, graduating with a J.D. in 1990.

== Career ==
As a member of the Republican Party in the Maryland House of Delegates, he served as Ranking Member on the House Appropriations Committee. McConkey fought in March 2007 to allow for an elected school board in Anne Arundel County. However, a bill was passed that allowed the Governor to select the members from a list. McConkey and Warren Miller were the only dissenting votes.

Another issue that McConkey advocated for was limiting privileges for illegal immigrants. He co-sponsored a bill in the House, similar to the one submitted by State Senator Janet Greenip to require driver's license applicants to prove they are citizens of the United States. Currently, Maryland is one of several states that does not demand proof of citizenship to obtain a driver's license.

McConkey was a real estate broker. In 2010, he pleaded guilty to violating laws that protect homeowners during foreclosure and lost his real estate licence and was ordered by a judge to pay $75,000. An administrative law judge called McConkey's behavior "fraudulent and unethical" in real estate transactions. According to court records, the state found that McConkey promised to help a woman keep her home, then didn't return her calls, bought her property in foreclosure and sought to evict her. He has sought to have his license restored.

McConkey's disbarment as an attorney in the state of Maryland is on record with the Maryland Court System.

In 2012, fellow Republican State Senator Edward Reilly filed an ethics complaint against McConkey, alleging that McConkey aggressively lobbied for a bill provision that would have helped him financially. According to Reilly's account, the dispute became heated enough that state troopers were called to remove McConkey from Reilly's office.

In 2013, he was reprimanded by the House for introducing legislation that would have personally benefited him.

On November 8, 2018, McConkey was defeated by Heather Bagnall, a Democrat, for Delegate in District 33A by less than 1 percentage point (185 vote margin).

== Legislative notes ==
- voted against the Clean Indoor Air Act of 2007 (HB359)
- voted against in-state tuition for illegal immigrants in 2007 (HB6)
- voted for the Healthy Air Act in 2006 (SB154)
- voted against slots in 2005 (HB1361)

== Election results ==
- 2006 Race for Maryland House of Delegates – 33rd District, Division A

Voters to choose two:

Name	Votes	Percent	Outcome
James King, Rep.	18,542	29.0%	Won
Tony McConkey, Rep.	16,655	26.0%	Won
Patricia Weathersbee, Dem.	15,226	23.8%	Lost
Paul G. Rudolph, Dem.	13,461	21.0%	Lost
Other Write-Ins	73	0.1%	

- 2002 Race for Maryland House of Delegates – 33rd District, Division A

Voters to choose two:

Name	Votes	Percent	Outcome
David Boschert, Rep.	20,279	33.0%	Won
Tony McConkey Rep.	16,157	26.3%	Won
Jim Snider, Dem.	11,427	18.6%	Lost
Steve Rizzi, Dem.	10,939	17.8%	Lost
Michael Anthony Lagana, Unaffiliated	2,622	4.3%	Lost
Other Write-Ins	31	0.1%	

- 1998 Race for Maryland House of Delegates – 30th District

Voters to choose three:

Name	Votes	Percent	Outcome
Michael E. Busch Dem.	24,075	21%	Won
Virginia P. Clagett, Dem.	24,036	21%	Won
Richard D'Amato, Dem.	20,223	18%	Won
Phillip D. Bissett, Rep.	18,690	16%	Lost
Anthony McConkey, Rep.	12,353	11%	Lost
Edward J. Turner, Rep.	14,119	12%	Lost

- 1994 Race for Maryland House of Delegates – District 22A

Voters to choose two:

Name	Votes	Percent	Outcome
Anne Healey Dem.	8,475	31%	Won
Richard A. Palumbo, Dem.	9,246	34%	Won
Anthony McConkey, Rep.	5,584	20%	Lost
Keith L. Poptanich, Rep.	3,989	15%	Lost
