= 426th Maryland General Assembly =

Regular session of the Maryland General Assembly

The 426th Maryland General Assembly convened in a regular session on January 14, 2009, and adjourned sine die on April 13, 2009.

== Senate ==
=== Party composition ===
Affiliation	Members
Democratic Party	33
Republican Party	14
Total	47

=== Leadership ===
Position	Name	Party	District
President of the Senate	Thomas V. "Mike" Miller Jr.	Democratic	27
President pro tem	Nathaniel J. McFadden	Democratic	45
Majority Leader	Edward J. Kasemeyer	Democratic	12
Majority Whip	Lisa Gladden	Democratic	41
Minority Leader	Allan H. Kittleman	Republican	9
Minority Whip	Nancy Jacobs	Republican	34

=== Members ===
District	Jurisdiction(s) represented	Image	Senator	Party	First elected	Primary committee	Executive nominations
1	Allegany, Garrett, and Washington		George C. Edwards	Republican	2006	Finance	—
2	Washington		Donald F. Munson	Republican	1990	Budget and Taxation	Member
3	Frederick and Washington		Alex X. Mooney	Republican	1998	Judicial Proceedings	—
4	Carroll and Frederick		David R. Brinkley	Republican	2002	Budget and Taxation	Member
5	Baltimore County and Carroll		Larry E. Haines	Republican	1990	Judicial Proceedings	Member
6	Baltimore County		Norman R. Stone Jr.	Democratic	1966	Judicial Proceedings	Member
7	Baltimore County and Harford	—	Andrew P. Harris	Republican	1998	Education, Health, and Environment	Member
8	Baltimore County		Katherine A. Klausmeier	Democratic	2002	Finance	Member
9	Carroll and Howard		Allan H. Kittleman	Republican	2004^{[a]}	Finance	Member
10	Baltimore County		Delores G. Kelley	Democratic	1994	Finance	Chair
11	Baltimore County		Robert Zirkin	Democratic	2006	Budget and Taxation	—
12	Baltimore County and Howard		Edward J. Kasemeyer	Democratic	1986	Budget and Taxation (Vice-Chair)	Member
13	Howard	—	James N. Robey	Democratic	2006	Budget and Taxation	—
14	Montgomery		Rona E. Kramer	Democratic	2002	Budget and Taxation	Member
15	Montgomery		Robert J. Garagiola	Democratic	2002	Finance	—
16	Montgomery		Brian E. Frosh	Democratic	1994	Judicial Proceedings (Chair)	Member
17	Montgomery		Jennie M. Forehand	Democratic	1994	Judicial Proceedings	Member
18	Montgomery		Richard Madaleno	Democratic	2006	Budget and Taxation	—
19	Montgomery	—	Michael G. Lenett	Democratic	2006	Education, Health, and Environment	—
20	Montgomery		Jamie Raskin	Democratic	2006	Judicial Proceedings	—
21	Anne Arundel and Prince George's		James Rosapepe	Democratic	2006	Education, Health, and Environment	—
22	Prince George's		Paul G. Pinsky	Democratic	1994	Education, Health, and Environment	—
23	Prince George's		Douglas J. J. Peters	Democratic	2006	Budget and Taxation	—
24	Prince George's		Nathaniel Exum	Democratic	1998	Finance	—
25	Prince George's		Ulysses Currie	Democratic	1994	Budget and Taxation (Chair)	Member
26	Prince George's		C. Anthony Muse	Democratic	2006	Judicial Proceedings	—
27	Calvert and Prince George's		Thomas V. "Mike" Miller Jr.	Democratic	1974	n/a^{[b]}	Member
28	Charles		Thomas M. "Mac" Middleton	Democratic	1994	Finance (Chair)	Member
29	Calvert, Charles, and St. Mary's		Roy Dyson	Democratic	1994	Education, Health, and Environment (Vice-Chair)	—
30	Anne Arundel		John Astle	Democratic	1994	Finance (Vice-Chair)	—
31	Anne Arundel		Bryan Simonaire	Republican	2006	Judicial Proceedings	—
32	Anne Arundel		James E. DeGrange Sr.	Democratic	1998	Budget and Taxation	Vice-Chair
33	Anne Arundel	—	Edward R. Reilly	Republican	2009^{[a]}	Education, Health and Environmental Affairs	—
34	Cecil and Harford		Nancy Jacobs	Republican	1998	Judicial Proceedings	—
35	Harford		Barry Glassman	Republican	1998	Finance	—
36	Caroline, Cecil, Kent, and Queen Anne's		E. J. Pipkin	Republican	2002	Finance	—
37	Caroline, Dorchester, Talbot, and Wicomico		Richard F. Colburn	Republican	1994	Education, Health, and Environment	—
38	Somerset, Wicomico, and Worcester		J. Lowell Stoltzfus	Republican	1992^{[a]}	Budget and Taxation	—
39	Montgomery		Nancy J. King	Democratic	2007	Budget and Taxation	—
40	Baltimore City		Catherine E. Pugh	Democratic	2006	Finance	—
41	Baltimore City		Lisa Gladden	Democratic	2002	Judicial Proceedings (Vice-Chair)	—
42	Baltimore County		James Brochin	Democratic	2002	Judicial Proceedings	—
43	Baltimore City		Joan Carter Conway	Democratic	1997^{[a]}	Education, Health, and Environment (Chair)	—
44	Baltimore City		Verna L. Jones	Democratic	2002	Budget and Taxation	—
45	Baltimore City		Nathaniel J. McFadden	Democratic	1994	Budget and Taxation	Member
46	Baltimore City		George W. Della Jr.	Democratic	1982	Finance	—
47	Prince George's		David C. Harrington	Democratic	2008^{[a]}	Education, Health, and Environment	—

== Notes ==
^{a} This Senator was originally appointed to office by the Governor to fill an open seat.

^{b} The President of the Senate does not serve on any of the four standing legislative committees. He does, however, serve on both the Executive Nominations and the Rules Committees.

== House of Delegates ==
=== Party composition ===
Affiliation	Members
Democratic Party	104
Republican Party	37
Unaffiliated	0
Total	141
Government majority	67

=== Leadership ===
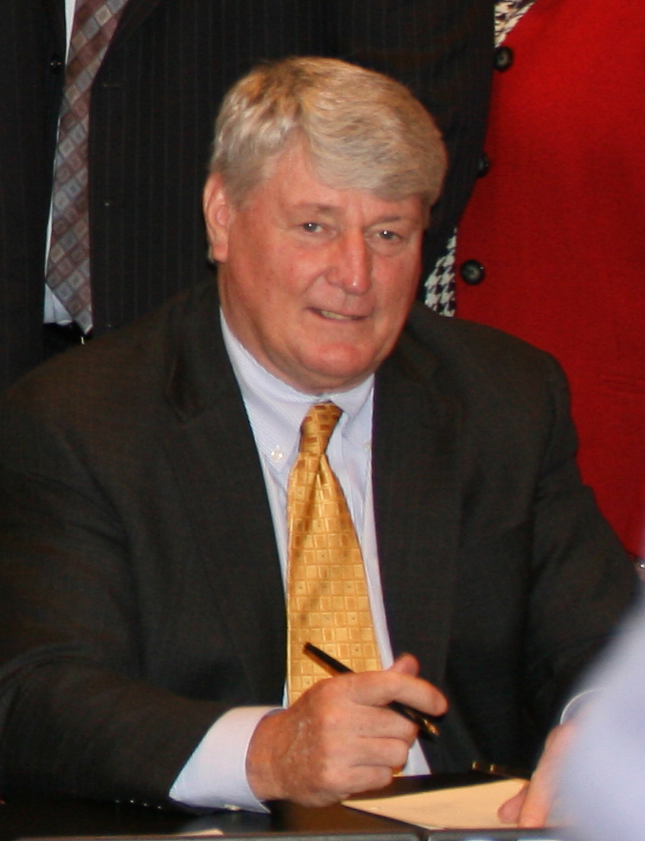
Michael E. Busch, House Speaker

Position	Name	Party	District
Speaker of the House	Michael E. Busch	Democratic	30
Speaker Pro Tempore	Adrienne A. Jones	Democratic	10
Majority Leader	Kumar P. Barve	Democratic	17
Majority Whip	Talmadge Branch	Democratic	45
Minority Leader	Tony O'Donnell	Republican	29C
Minority Whip	Christopher B. Shank	Republican	2B

=== Members ===
Democrat/Republican
Democratic Party
Republican Party

District	Counties represented	Delegate	Party	First elected	Committee
1A	Allegany, Garrett	Wendell R. Beitzel	Republican	2006	Health and Government Operations
1B	Allegany	Kevin Kelly	Democratic	1986	Judiciary
1C	Allegany, Washington	LeRoy E. Myers Jr.	Republican	2002	Appropriations
2A	Washington	Andrew A. Serafini	Republican	2008	Ways and Means
2B	Washington	Chris Shank	Republican	1998	Judiciary
2C	Washington	John P. Donoghue	Democratic	1990	Health and Government Operations
3A	Frederick	Galen R. Clagett	Democratic	2002	Appropriations
3A	Frederick	Sue Hecht	Democratic	1994	Economic Matters
3B	Frederick, Washington	Richard B. Weldon	Republican	2010	Health and Government Operations
4A	Frederick	Joseph R. Bartlett	Republican	1998	Ways and Means
4A	Frederick	Paul S. Stull	Republican	1994	Environmental Matters
4B	Carroll, Frederick	Donald B. Elliott	Republican	1986	Health and Government Operations
5A	Carroll	Tanya Shewell	Republican	2004	Environmental Matters
5A	Carroll	Nancy Stocksdale	Republican	1994	Appropriations
5B	Carroll, Baltimore County	Wade Kach	Republican	1974	Health and Government Operations
6	Baltimore County	Joseph J. Minnick	Democratic	1988	Economic Matters
6	Baltimore County	John A. Olszewski Jr.	Democratic	2006	Ways and Means
6	Baltimore County	Michael H. Weir Jr.	Democratic	2002	Environmental Matters
7	Baltimore County, Harford	Richard Impallaria	Republican	2002	Economic Matters
7	Baltimore County, Harford	J. B. Jennings	Republican	2002	Ways and Means
7	Baltimore County, Harford	Pat McDonough	Republican	1978	Health and Government Operations
8	Baltimore County	Todd Schuler	Democratic	2006	Judiciary
8	Baltimore County	Eric M. Bromwell	Democratic	2002	Health and Government Operations
8	Baltimore County	Joe Boteler	Republican	2002	Environmental Matters
9A	Howard	Gail H. Bates	Republican	2002	Appropriations
9A	Howard	Warren E. Miller	Republican	2003	Economic Matters
9B	Carroll	Susan W. Krebs	Republican	2002	Ways and Means
10	Baltimore County	Emmett Burns	Democratic	1994	Economic Matters
10	Baltimore County	Adrienne A. Jones	Democratic	1997	Appropriations
10	Baltimore County	Shirley Nathan-Pulliam	Democratic	1994	Health and Government Operations
11	Baltimore County	Jon S. Cardin	Democratic	2002	Ways and Means
11	Baltimore County	Dan K. Morhaim	Democratic	1994	Health and Government Operations
11	Baltimore County	Dana Stein	Democratic	2002	Environmental Matters
12A	Baltimore County, Howard	Steve DeBoy	Democratic	2002	Appropriations
12A	Baltimore County, Howard	James Malone	Democratic	1994	Environmental Matters (Vice-Chair)
12B	Howard	Elizabeth Bobo	Democratic	1994	Environmental Matters
13	Howard	Shane Pendergrass	Democratic	1994	Health and Government Operations
13	Howard	Guy Guzzone	Democratic	2006	Appropriations
13	Howard	Frank S. Turner	Democratic	1994	Ways and Means
14	Montgomery	Anne R. Kaiser	Democratic	2002	Ways and Means
14	Montgomery	Karen Montgomery	Democratic	2002	Health and Government Operations
14	Montgomery	Herman Taylor	Democratic	2002	Economic Matters
15	Montgomery	Craig L. Rice	Democratic	2006	Ways and Means
15	Montgomery	Kathleen M. Dumais	Democratic	2002	Judiciary
15	Montgomery	Brian J. Feldman	Democratic	2002	Economic Matters
16	Montgomery	William A. Bronrott	Democratic	1998	Appropriations
16	Montgomery	William Frick	Democratic	2007	Ways and Means
16	Montgomery	Susan C. Lee	Democratic	2002	Judiciary
17	Montgomery	Kumar P. Barve	Democratic	1990	Ways and Means
17	Montgomery	James W. Gilchrist	Democratic	2006	Ways and Means
17	Montgomery	Luiz Simmons	Democratic	1978	Judiciary
18	Montgomery	Ana Sol Gutierrez	Democratic	2002	Appropriations
18	Montgomery	Alfred C. Carr Jr.	Democratic	2007	Environmental Matters
18	Montgomery	Jeff Waldstreicher	Democratic	2006	Judiciary
19	Montgomery	Hank Heller	Democratic	1986	Appropriations
19	Montgomery	Ben Kramer	Democratic	2006	Judiciary
19	Montgomery	Roger Manno	Democratic	2006	Economic Matters
20	Montgomery	Tom Hucker	Democratic	2006	Environmental Matters
20	Montgomery	Sheila E. Hixson	Democratic	1976	Ways and Means (Chair)
20	Montgomery	Heather R. Mizeur	Democratic	2006	Health and Government Operations
21	Anne Arundel, Prince George's	Barbara A. Frush	Democratic	1994	Environmental Matters
21	Anne Arundel, Prince George's	Ben Barnes	Democratic	2006	Judiciary
21	Anne Arundel, Prince George's	Joseline Pena-Melnyk	Democratic	2006	Health and Government Operations
22	Prince George's	Tawanna Gaines	Democratic	2001	Appropriations
22	Prince George's	Anne Healey	Democratic	1990	Environmental Matters
22	Prince George's	Justin D. Ross	Democratic	2002	Ways and Means
23A	Prince George's	Gerron Levi	Democratic	2006	Judiciary
23A	Prince George's	James W. Hubbard	Democratic	1992	Health and Government Operations
23B	Prince George's	Marvin E. Holmes Jr.	Democratic	2002	Environmental Matters
24	Prince George's	Joanne C. Benson	Democratic	1990	Health and Government Operations
24	Prince George's	Carolyn J. B. Howard	Democratic	1988	Ways and Means
24	Prince George's	Michael L. Vaughn	Democratic	2002	Economic Matters
25	Prince George's	Aisha N. Braveboy	Democratic	2006	Economic Matters
25	Prince George's	Dereck E. Davis	Democratic	1994	Economic Matters (Chair)
25	Prince George's	Melony G. Griffith	Democratic	1998	Appropriations
26	Prince George's	Kris Valderrama	Democratic	2006	Judiciary
26	Prince George's	Jay Walker	Democratic	2006	Ways and Means
26	Prince George's	Veronica L. Turner	Democratic	2002	Health and Government Operations
27A	Calvert, Prince George's	James E. Proctor Jr.	Democratic	1990	Appropriations (Vice-Chair)
27A	Calvert, Prince George's	Joseph F. Vallario Jr.	Democratic	1974	Judiciary (Chair)
27B	Calvert	Sue Kullen	Democratic	2004	Health and Government Operations
28	Charles	Peter Murphy	Democratic	2006	Ways and Means
28	Charles	Sally Y. Jameson	Democratic	2002	Economic Matters
28	Charles	Murray D. Levy	Democratic	2004	Appropriations
29A	Charles, St. Mary's	John F. Wood Jr.	Democratic	1986	Appropriations
29B	St. Mary's	John L. Bohanan Jr.	Democratic	1999	Appropriations
29C	Calvert, St. Mary's	Tony O'Donnell	Republican	1994	Environmental Matters
30	Anne Arundel	Michael E. Busch	Democratic	1986	Speaker of the House of Delegates
30	Anne Arundel	Virginia P. Clagett	Democratic	1994	Environmental Matters
30	Anne Arundel	Ron George	Republican	2006	Ways and Means
31	Anne Arundel	Nic Kipke	Republican	2006	Health and Government Operations
31	Anne Arundel	Don H. Dwyer Jr.	Republican	2002	Judiciary
31	Anne Arundel	Steve Schuh	Republican	2006	Appropriations
32	Anne Arundel	Pamela Beidle	Democratic	2006	Environmental Matters
32	Anne Arundel	Mary Ann Love	Democratic	1993	Economic Matters
32	Anne Arundel	Theodore J. Sophocleus	Democratic	1992	Appropriations
33A	Anne Arundel	James King	Republican	2006	Economic Matters
33A	Anne Arundel	Tony McConkey	Republican	2002	Judiciary
33B	Anne Arundel	Robert A. Costa	Republican	2002	Health and Government Operations
34A	Cecil, Harford	B. Daniel Riley	Democratic	1998	Health and Government Operations
34A	Cecil, Harford	Mary-Dulany James	Democratic	1998	Appropriations
34B	Cecil	David D. Rudolph	Democratic	1994	Economic Matters (Vice-Chair)
35A	Harford	H. Wayne Norman Jr.	Republican	2007	Environmental Matters
35A	Harford	Donna Stifler	Republican	2006	Economic Matters
35B	Harford	Susan K. McComas	Republican	2002	Judiciary
36	Caroline, Cecil, Kent, Queen Anne's	Michael D. Smigiel Sr.	Republican	2002	Judiciary
36	Caroline, Cecil, Kent, Queen Anne's	Richard A. Sossi	Republican	2002	Environmental Matters
36	Caroline, Cecil, Kent, Queen Anne's	Mary Roe Walkup	Republican	1994	Economic Matters
37A	Dorchester, Wicomico	Rudolph C. Cane	Democratic	1998	Environmental Matters
37B	Caroline, Dorchester, Talbot, Wicomico	Adelaide C. Eckardt	Republican	1994	Appropriations
37B	Caroline, Dorchester, Talbot, Wicomico	Jeannie Haddaway-Riccio	Republican	2002	Economic Matters
38A	Somerset, Wicomico	D. Page Elmore	Republican	2002	Ways and Means
38B	Wicomico, Worcester	Norman Conway	Democratic	1986	Appropriations (Chair)
38B	Wicomico, Worcester	James N. Mathias Jr.	Democratic	2006	Economic Matters
39	Montgomery	Charles E. Barkley	Democratic	1998	Appropriations
39	Montgomery	Kirill Reznik	Democratic	2007	Health and Government Operations
39	Montgomery	Saqib Ali	Democratic	2006	Environmental Matters
40	Baltimore City	Frank M. Conaway Jr.	Democratic	2006	Judiciary
40	Baltimore City	Barbara A. Robinson	Democratic	2006	Appropriations
40	Baltimore City	Shawn Z. Tarrant	Democratic	2006	Health and Government Operations
41	Baltimore City	Jill P. Carter	Democratic	2002	Judiciary
41	Baltimore City	Nathaniel T. Oaks	Democratic	1982	Health and Government Operations
41	Baltimore City	Samuel I. Rosenberg	Democratic	1982	Judiciary (Vice-Chair)
42	Baltimore County	Stephen W. Lafferty	Democratic	2006	Environmental Matters
42	Baltimore County	Susan L. M. Aumann	Republican	2002	Appropriations
42	Baltimore County	William J. Frank	Republican	2002	Judiciary
43	Baltimore City	Curt Anderson	Democratic	1982	Judiciary
43	Baltimore City	Ann Marie Doory	Democratic	1986	Ways and Means (Vice-Chair)
43	Baltimore City	Maggie McIntosh	Democratic	1992	Environmental Matters (Chair)
44	Baltimore City	Keith E. Haynes	Democratic	2002	Appropriations
44	Baltimore City	Ruth M. Kirk	Democratic	1982	Economic Matters
44	Baltimore City	Melvin L. Stukes	Democratic	2006	Ways and Means
45	Baltimore City	Talmadge Branch	Democratic	1994	Appropriations
45	Baltimore City	Cheryl Glenn	Democratic	2006	Environmental Matters
45	Baltimore City	Hattie N. Harrison	Democratic	1973	Economic Matters
46	Baltimore City	Peter A. Hammen	Democratic	1994	Health and Government Operations (Chair)
46	Baltimore City	Carolyn J. Krysiak	Democratic	1990	Economic Matters
46	Baltimore City	Brian K. McHale	Democratic	1990	Economic Matters
47	Prince George's	Jolene Ivey	Democratic	2006	Ways and Means
47	Prince George's	Doyle L. Niemann	Democratic	2002	Environmental Matters
47	Prince George's	Victor R. Ramirez	Democratic	2002	Judiciary

== Notable legislation enacted ==
- Senate Bill 279 - Death Penalty Restricts the use of the death penalty to cases in which the State presents the court or jury with (1) biological evidence or DNA evidence that links the defendant with the act of murder; (2) a videotaped, voluntary interrogation and confession of the defendant to the murder; or (3) a video recording that conclusively links the defendant to the murder. The bill also prohibits a defendant from being sentenced to death if the State relies solely on evidence provided by eyewitnesses.
- House Bill 387 - Verification of the lawful status of individuals seeking Maryland drivers licenses The 2005 REAL ID Act requires federal agencies to accept only personal identification cards that meet certain standards for official purposes. In order for Maryland to comply with the REAL ID Act the General Assembly passed HB 387. As of April 2009, Maryland was one of five states (along with Hawaii, New Mexico, Utah, and Washington) that extended the privilege to drive to individuals who do not have lawful status. HB 387 defines “lawful status” as it applies to the issuance of identification cards, driver’s licenses, and moped operator permits, and establishes a two-tiered approach to the issuance of these documents by the Motor Vehicle Administration (MVA), with the documents issued under one of these tiers considered invalid for certain official federal purposes. MVA may issue these documents, including driver’s licenses and the associated driving privilege, to an individual who held the document sought for renewal on April 18, 2009, regardless of lawful status or the absence of a valid Social Security number. However, MVA documents issued on or after July 1, 2010, must expire on July 1, 2015, and MVA may no longer undertake this two-tier issuance after July 1, 2015.

== See also ==
- Current members of the Maryland State Senate
- List of Maryland General Assemblies
