= 428th Maryland General Assembly =

2011 regular session of the Maryland General Assembly

The 428th Maryland General Assembly convened in a regular session on January 13, 2011, and adjourned sine die on April 12, 2011.

== Senate ==
=== Party composition ===
Affiliation	Members
Democratic Party	35
Republican Party	12
Total	47

=== Leadership ===
Position	Name	Party	District
President of the Senate	Thomas V. "Mike" Miller Jr.	Democratic	27
President pro tem	Nathaniel J. McFadden	Democratic	45
Majority Leader	Robert Garagiola	Democratic	15
Majority Whip	Lisa Gladden	Democratic	41
Minority Leader	Nancy Jacobs	Republican	34
Minority Whip	E. J. Pipkin	Republican	36

=== State senators ===
District	Jurisdiction(s) represented	Image	Senator	Party	First elected	Primary committee
1	Allegany, Garrett, and Washington		George C. Edwards	Republican	2006	Finance
2	Washington		Christopher B. Shank	Republican	2010	Budget and Taxation
3	Frederick and Washington		Ronald N. Young	Democrat	2010	Education, Health and Environmental Affairs
4	Carroll and Frederick		David R. Brinkley	Republican	2002	Budget and Taxation
5	Baltimore County and Carroll		Joseph M. Getty	Republican	2010	Judicial Proceedings
6	Baltimore County		Norman R. Stone Jr.	Democrat	1966	Judicial Proceedings
7	Baltimore County and Harford		J. B. Jennings	Republican	2010	Education, Health, and Environment
8	Baltimore County		Katherine A. Klausmeier	Democrat	2002	Finance
9	Carroll and Howard		Allan H. Kittleman	Republican	2004^{[a]}	Finance
10	Baltimore County		Delores G. Kelley	Democrat	1994	Finance
11	Baltimore County		Robert Zirkin	Democrat	2006	Budget and Taxation
12	Baltimore County and Howard		Edward J. Kasemeyer	Democrat	1986	Budget and Taxation (Vice-Chair)
13	Howard		James N. Robey	Democrat	2006	Budget and Taxation
14	Montgomery		Karen S. Montgomery	Democrat	2010	Budget and Taxation
15	Montgomery		Robert J. Garagiola	Democrat	2002	Finance
16	Montgomery		Brian E. Frosh	Democrat	1994	Judicial Proceedings (Chair)
17	Montgomery		Jennie M. Forehand	Democrat	1994	Judicial Proceedings
18	Montgomery		Richard Madaleno	Democrat	2006	Budget and Taxation
19	Montgomery		Roger Manno	Democrat	2010	Education, Health, and Environment
20	Montgomery		Jamie Raskin	Democrat	2006	Judicial Proceedings
21	Anne Arundel and Prince George's		James Rosapepe	Democrat	2006	Education, Health, and Environment
22	Prince George's		Paul G. Pinsky	Democrat	1994	Education, Health, and Environment
23	Prince George's		Douglas J. J. Peters	Democrat	2006	Budget and Taxation
24	Prince George's		Joanne C. Benson	Democrat	2010	Finance
25	Prince George's		Ulysses Currie	Democrat	1994	Budget and Taxation (Chair)
26	Prince George's		C. Anthony Muse	Democrat	2006	Judicial Proceedings
27	Calvert and Prince George's		Thomas V. "Mike" Miller Jr.	Democrat	1974	n/a^{[b]}
28	Charles		Thomas M. "Mac" Middleton	Democrat	1994	Finance (Chair)
29	Calvert, Charles, and St. Mary's		Roy Dyson	Democrat	1994	Education, Health, and Environment (Vice-Chair)
30	Anne Arundel		John Astle	Democrat	1994	Finance (Vice-Chair)
31	Anne Arundel		Bryan Simonaire	Republican	2006	Judicial Proceedings
32	Anne Arundel		James E. DeGrange Sr.	Democrat	1998	Budget and Taxation
33	Anne Arundel		Edward R. Reilly	Republican	2009^{[a]}	Education, Health and Environmental Affairs
34	Cecil and Harford		Nancy Jacobs	Republican	1998	Judicial Proceedings
35	Harford		Barry Glassman	Republican	1998	Finance
36	Caroline, Cecil, Kent, and Queen Anne's		E. J. Pipkin	Republican	2002	Finance
37	Caroline, Dorchester, Talbot, and Wicomico		Richard F. Colburn	Republican	1994	Education, Health, and Environment
38	Somerset, Wicomico, and Worcester		James N. Mathias Jr.	Democrat	2010	Budget and Taxation
39	Montgomery		Nancy J. King	Democrat	2007	Budget and Taxation
40	Baltimore City		Catherine E. Pugh	Democrat	2006	Finance
41	Baltimore City		Lisa Gladden	Democrat	2002	Judicial Proceedings (Vice-Chair)
42	Baltimore County		James Brochin	Democrat	2002	Judicial Proceedings
43	Baltimore City		Joan Carter Conway	Democrat	1997^{[a]}	Education, Health, and Environment (Chair)
44	Baltimore City		Verna L. Jones	Democrat	2002	Budget and Taxation
45	Baltimore City		Nathaniel J. McFadden	Democrat	1994	Budget and Taxation
46	Baltimore City		Bill Ferguson	Democrat	2010	Education, Health and Environment
47	Prince George's		Victor R. Ramirez	Democrat	2010	Judicial Proceedings

=== Notes ===
^{a} This Senator was originally appointed to office by the Governor to fill an open seat.

^{b} The President of the Senate does not serve on any of the four standing legislative committees. He does, however, serve on both the Executive Nominations and the Rules Committees.

== House of Delegates ==
=== Party composition ===
Affiliation	Members
Democratic Party	98
Republican Party	43
Total	141
Government majority	67

=== Leadership ===
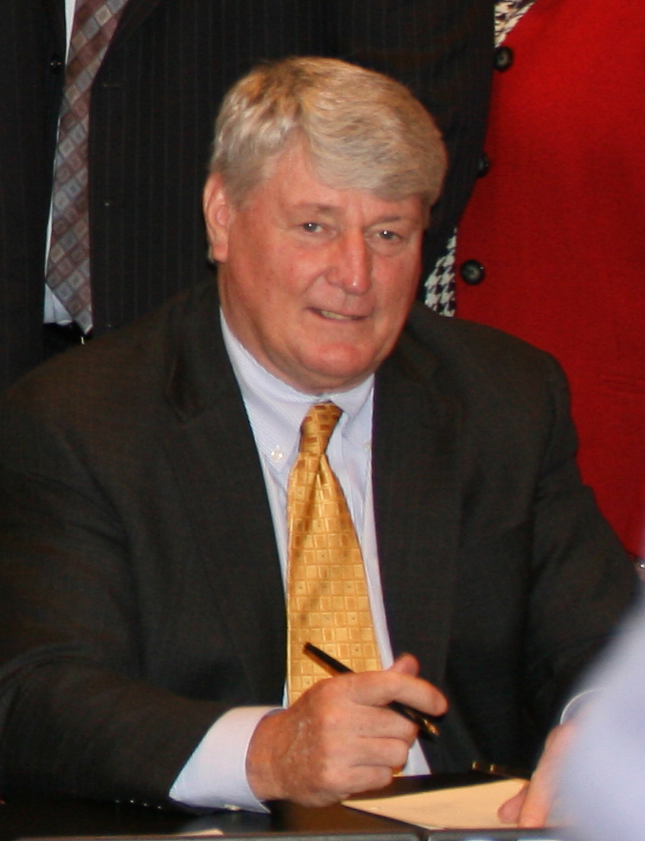
Michael E. Busch, House Speaker

Position	Name	Party	District
Speaker of the House	Michael E. Busch	Democratic	30
Speaker Pro Tempore	Adrienne A. Jones	Democratic	10
Majority Leader	Kumar P. Barve	Democratic	17
Majority Whip	Talmadge Branch	Democratic	45
Minority Leader	Tony O'Donnell	Republican	29C
Minority Whip	Jeannie Haddaway-Riccio	Republican	37B

=== State delegates ===
Democrat/Republican
Democratic Party
Republican Party

District	Counties represented	Delegate	Party	First elected	Committee
1A	Allegany, Garrett	Wendell R. Beitzel	Republican	2006	Health and Government Operations
1B	Allegany	Kevin Kelly	Democratic	1986	Judiciary
1C	Allegany, Washington	LeRoy E. Myers Jr.	Republican	2002	Appropriations
2A	Washington	Andrew A. Serafini	Republican	2008	Ways and Means
2B	Washington	Neil Parrott	Republican	2010	Judiciary
2C	Washington	John P. Donoghue	Democratic	1990	Health and Government Operations
3A	Frederick	Galen R. Clagett	Democratic	2002	Appropriations
3A	Frederick	Patrick N. Hogan	Republican	2010	Environmental Matters
3B	Frederick, Washington	Michael Hough	Republican	2010	Appropriations
4A	Frederick	Kathy Afzali	Republican	2010	Ways and Means
4A	Frederick	Kelly M. Schulz	Republican	2010	Economic Matters
4B	Carroll, Frederick	Donald B. Elliott	Republican	1986	Health and Government Operations
5A	Carroll	Justin Ready	Republican	2010	Health and Government Operations
5A	Carroll	Nancy R. Stocksdale	Republican	1994	Appropriations
5B	Carroll, Baltimore County	Wade Kach	Republican	1974	Health and Government Operations
6	Baltimore County	Joseph J. Minnick	Democratic	1988	Economic Matters
6	Baltimore County	John A. Olszewski Jr.	Democratic	2006	Ways and Means
6	Baltimore County	Michael H. Weir Jr.	Democratic	2002	Environmental Matters
7	Baltimore County, Harford	Richard Impallaria	Republican	2002	Economic Matters
7	Baltimore County, Harford	Pat McDonough	Republican	1978	Health and Government Operations
7	Baltimore County, Harford	Kathy Szeliga	Republican	2010	Appropriations
8	Baltimore County	Joseph C. Boteler III	Republican	2002	Environmental Matters
8	Baltimore County	Eric M. Bromwell	Democratic	2002	Health and Government Operations
8	Baltimore County	John W. E. Cluster Jr.	Republican	2010	Judiciary
9A	Howard	Gail H. Bates	Republican	2002	Appropriations
9A	Howard	Warren E. Miller	Republican	2003	Economic Matters
9B	Carroll	Susan W. Krebs	Republican	2002	Ways and Means
10	Baltimore County	Emmett C. Burns Jr.	Democratic	1994	Economic Matters
10	Baltimore County	Adrienne A. Jones	Democratic	1997	Appropriations
10	Baltimore County	Shirley Nathan-Pulliam	Democratic	1994	Health and Government Operations
11	Baltimore County	Jon S. Cardin	Democratic	2002	Ways and Means
11	Baltimore County	Dan K. Morhaim	Democratic	1994	Health and Government Operations
11	Baltimore County	Dana Stein	Democratic	2002	Environmental Matters
12A	Baltimore County, Howard	Steven J. DeBoy Sr.	Democratic	2002	Appropriations
12A	Baltimore County, Howard	James E. Malone Jr.	Democratic	1994	Environmental Matters (Vice-Chair)
12B	Howard	Elizabeth Bobo	Democratic	1994	Environmental Matters
13	Howard	Guy Guzzone	Democratic	2006	Appropriations
13	Howard	Shane Pendergrass	Democratic	1994	Health and Government Operations
13	Howard	Frank S. Turner	Democratic	1994	Ways and Means
14	Montgomery	Anne R. Kaiser	Democratic	2002	Ways and Means
14	Montgomery	Eric Luedtke	Democratic	2010	Ways and Means
14	Montgomery	Craig Zucker	Democratic	2010	Appropriations
15	Montgomery	Kathleen M. Dumais	Democratic	2002	Judiciary (Vice-Chair)
15	Montgomery	Brian Feldman	Democratic	2002	Economic Matters
15	Montgomery	Aruna Miller	Democratic	2010	Ways and Means
16	Montgomery	William Frick	Democratic	2007	Ways and Means
16	Montgomery	Ariana Kelly	Democratic	2010	Health and Government Operations
16	Montgomery	Susan C. Lee	Democratic	2002	Judiciary
17	Montgomery	Kumar P. Barve	Democratic	1990	Ways and Means
17	Montgomery	James W. Gilchrist	Democratic	2006	Environmental Matters
17	Montgomery	Luiz R. S. Simmons	Democratic	1978	Judiciary
18	Montgomery	Alfred C. Carr Jr.	Democratic	2007	Environmental Matters
18	Montgomery	Ana Sol Gutierrez	Democratic	2002	Appropriations
18	Montgomery	Jeff Waldstreicher	Democratic	2006	Judiciary
19	Montgomery	Sam Arora	Democratic	2010	Judiciary
19	Montgomery	Bonnie Cullison	Democratic	2010	Health and Government Operations
19	Montgomery	Benjamin F. Kramer	Democratic	2006	Economic Matters
20	Montgomery	Tom Hucker	Democratic	2006	Economic Matters
20	Montgomery	Sheila E. Hixson	Democratic	1976	Ways and Means (Chair)
20	Montgomery	Heather Mizeur	Democratic	2006	Health and Government Operations
21	Anne Arundel, Prince George's	Barbara A. Frush	Democratic	1994	Environmental Matters
21	Anne Arundel, Prince George's	Ben Barnes	Democratic	2006	Economic Matters
21	Anne Arundel, Prince George's	Joseline Peña-Melnyk	Democratic	2006	Health and Government Operations
22	Prince George's	Tawanna P. Gaines	Democratic	2001	Appropriations
22	Prince George's	Anne Healey	Democratic	1990	Environmental Matters
22	Prince George's	Justin Ross	Democratic	2002	Ways and Means
23A	Prince George's	James W. Hubbard	Democratic	1992	Health and Government Operations
23A	Prince George's	Geraldine Valentino-Smith	Democratic	2010	Judiciary
23B	Prince George's	Marvin E. Holmes Jr.	Democratic	2002	Environmental Matters
24	Prince George's	Tiffany Alston	Democratic	2010	Judiciary
24	Prince George's	Carolyn J. B. Howard	Democratic	1988	Ways and Means
24	Prince George's	Michael L. Vaughn	Democratic	2002	Economic Matters
25	Prince George's	Aisha N. Braveboy	Democratic	2006	Economic Matters
25	Prince George's	Dereck E. Davis	Democratic	1994	Economic Matters (Chair)
25	Prince George's	Melony G. Griffith	Democratic	1998	Appropriations
26	Prince George's	Veronica L. Turner	Democratic	2002	Health and Government Operations
26	Prince George's	Kris Valderrama	Democratic	2006	Judiciary
26	Prince George's	Jay Walker	Democratic	2006	Economic Matters
27A	Calvert, Prince George's	James E. Proctor Jr.	Democratic	1990	Appropriations (Vice-Chair)
27A	Calvert, Prince George's	Joseph F. Vallario Jr.	Democratic	1974	Judiciary (Chair)
27B	Calvert	Mark N. Fisher	Republican	2010	Ways and Means
28	Charles	Peter Murphy	Democratic	2006	Health and Government Operations
28	Charles	Sally Y. Jameson	Democratic	2002	Economic Matters
28	Charles	C. T. Wilson	Democratic	2010	Environmental Matters
29A	Charles, St. Mary's	John F. Wood Jr.	Democratic	1986	Appropriations
29B	St. Mary's	John L. Bohanan Jr.	Democratic	1999	Appropriations
29C	Calvert, St. Mary's	Tony O'Donnell	Republican	1994	Environmental Matters
30	Anne Arundel	Michael E. Busch	Democratic	1986	Speaker of the House of Delegates
30	Anne Arundel	Ron George	Republican	2006	Ways and Means
30	Anne Arundel	Herb McMillan	Republican	2010	Environmental Matters
31	Anne Arundel	Don H. Dwyer Jr.	Republican	2006	Judiciary
31	Anne Arundel	Nic Kipke	Republican	2002	Health and Government Operations
31	Anne Arundel	Steve Schuh	Republican	2006	Economic Matters
32	Anne Arundel	Pamela Beidle	Democratic	2006	Environmental Matters
32	Anne Arundel	Mary Ann Love	Democratic	1993	Economic Matters
32	Anne Arundel	Theodore J. Sophocleus	Democratic	1992	Appropriations
33A	Anne Arundel	Tony McConkey	Republican	2002	Judiciary
33A	Anne Arundel	Cathy Vitale	Republican	2010	Environmental Matters
33B	Anne Arundel	Robert A. Costa	Republican	2002	Health and Government Operations
34A	Cecil, Harford	Glen Glass	Republican	2010	Ways and Means
34A	Cecil, Harford	Mary-Dulany James	Democratic	1998	Appropriations
34B	Cecil	David D. Rudolph	Democratic	1994	Economic Matters (Vice-Chair)
35A	Harford	H. Wayne Norman Jr.	Republican	2007	Environmental Matters
35A	Harford	Donna Stifler	Republican	2006	Economic Matters
35B	Harford	Susan K. McComas	Republican	2002	Judiciary
36	Caroline, Cecil, Kent, Queen Anne's	Steve Hershey	Republican	2010	Economic Matters
36	Caroline, Cecil, Kent, Queen Anne's	Jay Jacobs	Republican	2010	Environmental Matters
36	Caroline, Cecil, Kent, Queen Anne's	Michael D. Smigiel Sr.	Republican	2002	Judiciary
37A	Dorchester, Wicomico	Rudolph C. Cane	Democratic	1998	Environmental Matters
37B	Caroline, Dorchester, Talbot, Wicomico	Adelaide C. Eckardt	Republican	1994	Appropriations
37B	Caroline, Dorchester, Talbot, Wicomico	Jeannie Haddaway-Riccio	Republican	2002	Economic Matters
38A	Somerset, Wicomico	Charles James Otto	Republican	2010	Environmental Matters
38B	Wicomico, Worcester	Norman Conway	Democratic	1986	Appropriations (Chair)
38B	Wicomico, Worcester	Mike McDermott	Republican	2010	Judiciary
39	Montgomery	Charles E. Barkley	Democratic	1998	Appropriations
39	Montgomery	Kirill Reznik	Democratic	2007	Health and Government Operations
39	Montgomery	Shane Robinson	Democratic	2010	Environmental Matters
40	Baltimore City	Frank M. Conaway Jr.	Democratic	2006	Judiciary
40	Baltimore City	Barbara Robinson	Democratic	2006	Appropriations
40	Baltimore City	Shawn Z. Tarrant	Democratic	2006	Health and Government Operations
41	Baltimore City	Jill P. Carter	Democratic	2002	Judiciary
41	Baltimore City	Nathaniel T. Oaks	Democratic	1982	Health and Government Operations
41	Baltimore City	Samuel I. Rosenberg	Democratic	1982	Ways and Means (Vice-Chair)
42	Baltimore County	Stephen W. Lafferty	Democratic	2006	Environmental Matters
42	Baltimore County	Susan L. M. Aumann	Republican	2002	Appropriations
42	Baltimore County	William J. Frank	Republican	2002	Health and Government Operations
43	Baltimore City	Curt Anderson	Democratic	1982	Judiciary
43	Baltimore City	Maggie McIntosh	Democratic	1992	Environmental Matters (Chair)
43	Baltimore City	Mary L. Washington	Democratic	2010	Appropriations
44	Baltimore City	Keith E. Haynes	Democratic	2002	Appropriations
44	Baltimore City	Keiffer Mitchell	Democratic	1982	Judiciary
44	Baltimore City	Melvin L. Stukes	Democratic	2006	Ways and Means
45	Baltimore City	Talmadge Branch	Democratic	1994	Ways and Means
45	Baltimore City	Cheryl Glenn	Democratic	2006	Environmental Matters
45	Baltimore City	Hattie N. Harrison	Democratic	1973	Economic Matters
46	Baltimore City	Luke Clippinger	Democratic	2010	Judiciary
46	Baltimore City	Peter A. Hammen	Democratic	1994	Health and Government Operations (Chair)
46	Baltimore City	Brian K. McHale	Democratic	1990	Economic Matters
47	Prince George's	Jolene Ivey	Democratic	2006	Ways and Means
47	Prince George's	Doyle Niemann	Democratic	2002	Environmental Matters
47	Prince George's	Michael G. Summers	Democratic	2010	Ways and Means

== Notable legislation enacted ==
- Primary and Secondary Education Funding The budget bill, Senate Bill 140, enacted by the 427th Maryland General Assembly increased Maryland State aid for primary and secondary education by $210.5 million in fiscal 2011 to a total of $5.7 billion. State aid provided directly to the local boards of education was increased by $119.7 million or 2.5%, while teachers’ retirement costs, which are paid by the State on behalf of the local school systems, will increase from $759.1 million to $849.8 million.
- Senate Bill 517 - Maryland Gang Prosecution Act of 2010 The increasing number of gangs had created a significant problem in most areas of the country, including Maryland. More than 600 active gangs are reported to be in the State with more than 11,000 members. The Maryland Department of Public Safety and Correctional Services has also identified approximately 4,000 inmates as participating in more than 260 different gangs inside its correctional facilities. Inter alia, SB 517 modifies the definition of “criminal gang” by repealing the requirement that an association of three or more persons whose members meet certain criteria be ongoing and by repealing “an identifying sign, symbol, name, leader, or purpose” as common factors and substituting “an overt or covert organizational or command structure.”
- House Bill 934 - Distracted Driving, Handheld Cell Phones This bill outlaws the use of handheld phones by drivers while operating a motor vehicle. The bill also prohibits drivers of a school vehicles, the holders of a learner’s instructional permit or provisional driver’s licenses from driving and talking on hand held cell phones as well. The bill's prohibitions do not apply to the emergency use of a handheld telephone. Commercial drivers using push-to-talk technology are exempted as well.

== See also ==
- Current members of the Maryland State Senate
- List of Maryland General Assemblies
