= List of Maryland General Assembly sessions =

List of Maryland state legislatures

The following is a list of legislative sessions of the Maryland General Assembly, the law-making branch of government of the U.S. state of Maryland. The Assembly traces its history back to the establishment of the Province of Maryland as an English colony in 1634. The Assembly was prorogued in 1774, but its members gathered at the Annapolis Convention to declare independence from the British crown, join the Continental Congress, and draft the Maryland Constitution of 1776. Maryland ratified the United States Constitution on April 28, 1788.

== Sessions ==
=== Colonial sessions ===
Number	Name	Start date	End date
1	Proprietary Assembly	1634/1635	
2	Freemen's Assembly	January 25, 1637/1638	March 24, 1637/1638
3	Proprietary Assembly	February 25, 1638/1639	March 19, 1638/1639
4	Proprietary Assembly	October 12, 1640	October 24, 1640
5	Proprietary Assembly	August 2, 1641	August 12, 1641
6	Freemen's Assembly	March 21, 1641/1642	March 23, 1641/1642
7	Proprietary Assembly	August 2, 1641	August 12, 1641
8	Freemen's Assembly	September 5, 1642	September 13, 1642
9	Proprietary Assembly	February 11, 1644/1645	N/A
10	Proprietary Assembly	Fall of 1646	
11	Proprietary Assembly	December 29, 1646	January 2, 1647
12	Freemen's Assembly	January 7, 1647/1648	March 4, 1647/1648
13	Proprietary Assembly	April 2, 1649	April 21, 1649
14	Proprietary Assembly	April 6, 1650	April 29, 19650
15	Proprietary Assembly	1650/1651	
16	Commonwealth Assembly	June 24, 1652(?)	June 28, 1652(?)
17	Commonwealth Assembly	October 1654	October 20, 1654
18	Commonwealth Assembly	September 24, 1657	September 24, 1657
19	Proprietary Assembly	April 27, 1658	May 6, 1658
20	Proprietary Assembly	February 28, 1659/1660	March 14, 1659/1660
21	Proprietary Assembly	April 17, 1661	May 2, 1661
22	Proprietary Assembly	April 1, 1662	April 12, 1662
23	Proprietary Assembly	September 15, 1663	October 3, 1663
24	Proprietary Assembly	September 13, 1664	September 21, 1664
25	Proprietary Assembly	April 10, 1666	May 3, 1666
26	Proprietary Assembly	April 13, 1669	May 8, 1669
27	Proprietary Assembly	March 27, 1671	April 19, 1671
28	Proprietary Assembly	October 10, 1671	October 19, 1671
29	Proprietary Assembly	May 19, 1674	June 6, 1674
30	Proprietary Assembly	February 12, 1674/1675	February 24, 1674/1675
31	Proprietary Assembly	May 15, 1676	June 15, 1676
32	Proprietary Assembly	October 20, 1678	November 14, 1678
33	Proprietary Assembly	August 16, 1681	September 17, 1681
34	Proprietary Assembly	April 25, 1682	May 13, 1682
35	Proprietary Assembly	April 25, 1682	May 13, 1682
36	Proprietary Assembly	October 26, 1682	November 17, 1682
37	Proprietary Assembly	October 2, 1683	November 6, 1683
38	Proprietary Assembly	April 1, 1684	April 26, 1684
39	Proprietary Assembly	October 27, 1686	November 19, 1686
40	Proprietary Assembly	November 14, 1688	December 8, 1688
41	Protestant Convention	August 22, 1689	September 4, 1689
42	Protestant Convention	April 1, 1690	April 4, 1690(?)
43	Protestant Convention	September 29, 1690	October 6, 1690
44	Protestant Convention	April 12, 1691(?)	April 25, 1691
45	Protestant Convention	August 1691	September 10, 1691
46	Protestant Convention	April 9, 1692	April 9, 1692
47	Royal Assembly	May 10, 1692	June 9, 1692
48	Royal Assembly	September 20, 1693	September 26, 1693
49	Royal Assembly	September 20, 1694	October 18, 1694
50	Royal Assembly	February 28, 1694/1695	March 1, 1694/1695
51	Royal Assembly	May 8, 1695	May 22, 1695
52	Royal Assembly	October 2, 1695	October 19, 1695
53	Royal Assembly	April 30, 1696	May 14, 1696
54	Royal Assembly	July 1, 1696	July 10, 1696
55	Royal Assembly	September 16, 1696	October 2, 1696
56	Royal Assembly	May 26, 1697	June 11, 1697
57	Royal Assembly	March 10, 1697/1698	April 4, 1698
58	Royal Assembly	October 20, 1698	November 12, 1698
59	Royal Assembly	June 29, 1699	July 22, 1699
60	Royal Assembly	April 26, 1700	May 9, 1700
61	Royal Assembly	May 8, 1701	May 17, 1701
62	Royal Assembly	March 16, 1701/1702	March 25, 1702
63	Royal Assembly	June 25, 1702	June 26, 1702
64	Royal Assembly	October 26, 1703	October 29, 1703
65	Royal Assembly	April 26, 1704	May 3, 1704
66	Royal Assembly	September 5, 1704	October 3, 1704
67	Royal Assembly	December 5, 1704	December 9, 1704
68	Royal Assembly	May 15, 1705	May 25, 1705
69	Royal Assembly	April 2, 1706	April 19, 1706
70	Royal Assembly	March 26, 1707	April 15, 1707
71	Royal Assembly	September 27, 1708	October 5, 1708
72	Royal Assembly	November 29, 1708	December 17, 1708
73	Royal Assembly	October 26, 1709	November 11, 1709
74	Royal Assembly	October 24, 1710	November 4, 1710
75	Royal Assembly	October 23, 1711	November 3, 1711
76	Royal Assembly	October 28, 1712	November 15, 1712
77	Royal Assembly	October 27, 1713	November 14, 1713
78	Royal Assembly	June 22, 1714	July 3, 1714
79	Royal Assembly	October 5, 1714	October 9, 1714
80	Royal Assembly	April 26, 1715	June 3, 1715
81	Proprietary Convention	April 24, 1716	April 24, 1716
82	Proprietary Assembly	July 17, 1716	August 10, 1716
83	Proprietary Assembly	May 28, 1717	June 8, 1717
84	Proprietary Assembly	April 22, 1718	May 10, 1718
85	Proprietary Assembly	May 14, 1719	June 6, 1719
86	Proprietary Assembly	April 5, 1720	April 22, 1720
87	Proprietary Assembly	October 11, 1720	October 27, 1720
88	Proprietary Assembly	July 18, 1721	August 5, 1721
89	Proprietary Assembly	April 5, 1720	April 22, 1720
90	Proprietary Assembly	October 9, 1722	November 3, 1722
91	Proprietary Assembly	September 23, 1723	October 26, 1723
92	Proprietary Assembly	October 6, 1724	November 4, 1724
93	Proprietary Assembly	October 6, 1725	November 6, 1725
94	Proprietary Assembly	March 15, 1725/1726	March 23, 1725/1726
95	Proprietary Assembly	July 12, 1726	July 25, 1726
96	Proprietary Assembly	October 10, 1727	October 30, 1727
97	Proprietary Assembly	October 3, 1728	October 30, 1728
98	Proprietary Assembly	July 10, 1729	August 8, 1729
99	Proprietary Assembly	May 21, 1730	June 16, 1730
100	Proprietary Assembly	July 13, 1731	July 29, 1731
101	Proprietary Assembly	August 19, 1731	September 6, 1731
102	Proprietary Assembly	July 11, 1732	August 8, 1732
103	Proprietary Assembly	March 13, 1732/1733	April 12, 1733
104	Proprietary Convention	March 19, 1733/1734	March 25, 1734
105	Proprietary Assembly	March 20, 1734/1735	April 24, 1735
106	Proprietary Convention	March 19, 1735/1736	April 10, 1736
107	Proprietary Assembly	April 20, 1736	May 6, 1736
108	Proprietary Assembly	April 26, 1737	May 28, 1737
109	Proprietary Assembly	August 11, 1737	August 17, 1737
110	Proprietary Convention	May 3, 1738	May 27, 1738
111	Proprietary Convention	May 1, 1739	June 12, 1739
112	Proprietary Assembly	April 23, 1740	June 5, 1740
113	Proprietary Assembly	July 7, 1740	July 29, 1740
114	Proprietary Assembly	May 26, 1741	June 22, 1741
115	Proprietary Assembly	September 21, 1742	October 29, 1742
116	Proprietary Assembly	May 1, 1744	June 4, 1744
117	Proprietary Assembly	August 5, 1745	September 28, 1745
118	1st Proprietary Convention	March 12, 1745/1746	March 29, 1746
119	Proprietary Assembly	June 17, 1746	July 8, 1746
120	Proprietary Assembly	November 6, 1746	November 12, 1746
121	Proprietary Assembly	May 16, 1747	July 11, 1747
122	2nd Proprietary Convention	December 22, 1747	December 23, 1747
123	Proprietary Assembly	May 10, 1748	June 11, 1748
124	Proprietary Convention	May 9, 1749	May 11, 1749
125	Proprietary Assembly	May 24, 1749	June 24, 1749
126	Proprietary Assembly	April 20, 1736	May 6, 1736
127	Proprietary Assembly	May 15, 1751	June 8, 1751
128	Proprietary Assembly	December 7, 1751	December 14, 1751
129	Proprietary Assembly	June 3, 1752	June 23, 1752
130	Proprietary Assembly	October 2, 1753	November 17, 1753
131	Proprietary Assembly	February 26, 1754	March 9, 1754
132	Proprietary Assembly	May 8, 1754	May 30, 1754
133	Proprietary Assembly	July 17, 1754	July 25, 1754
134	Proprietary Assembly	December 12, 1754	December 24, 1754
135	Proprietary Assembly	February 22, 1755	March 26, 1755
136	Proprietary Assembly	June 23, 1755	July 8, 1755
137	Proprietary Assembly	February 23, 1756	May 22, 1756
138	Proprietary Assembly	September 14, 1756	October 9, 1756
139	Proprietary Assembly	April 8, 1757	May 9, 1757
140	Proprietary Assembly	September 28, 1757	December 16, 1757
141	Proprietary Convention	February 13, 1758	March 9, 1758
142	Proprietary Assembly	September 28, 1757	December 16, 1757
143	1st Proprietary Convention	October 23, 1758	November 4, 1758
144	Proprietary Assembly	November 22, 1758	December 23, 1758
145	2nd Proprietary Convention	April 4, 1759	April 17, 1759
146	Proprietary Assembly	March 22, 1760	April 11, 1760
147	Proprietary Assembly	September 26, 1760	October 15, 1760
148	3rd Proprietary Convention	April 13, 1761	May 6, 1761
149	Proprietary Assembly	March 17, 1762	April 24, 1762
150	Proprietary Assembly	October 4, 1763	November 26, 1763
151	Proprietary Assembly	September 23, 1765	September 28, 1765
152	Proprietary Assembly	November 1, 1765	December 20, 1765
153	Proprietary Assembly	May 9, 1766	May 27, 166
154	Proprietary Assembly	November 1, 1766	December 6, 1766
155	Proprietary Assembly	May 24, 1768	June 22, 1768
156	Proprietary Assembly	November 17, 1769	December 20, 1769
157	Proprietary Assembly	September 25, 1770	November 2, 1770
158	Proprietary Assembly	November 5, 1770	November 21, 1770
159	Proprietary Assembly	October 2, 1771	November 30, 1771
160	Proprietary Assembly	June 15, 1773	July 3, 1773
161	Proprietary Convention	October 13, 1773	October 29, 1773
162	Proprietary Assembly	November 16, 1773	December 23, 1773
163	Proprietary Assembly	March 23, 1774	April 19, 1774
165	1st Convention	June 22, 1774	June 25, 1774
166	2nd Convention	November 21, 1774	November 25, 1774
167	3rd Convention	December 8, 1774	December 12, 1774
168	4th Convention	April 24, 1775	May 3, 1775
169	5th Convention	July 26, 1775	August 14, 1775
170	6th Convention	December 7, 1775	January 18, 1776
171	7th Convention	May 8, 1776	May 25, 1776
172	8th Convention	June 21, 1776	July 6, 1776
173	9th Convention	August 14, 1776	November 11, 1776

=== Post-colonial sessions ===
Number	Name	Start date	End date	Last election
174	174th Maryland General Assembly	February 5, 1777	April 20, 1777	?
175	175th Maryland General Assembly	October 21, 1777	December 23, 1777	?
176	176th Maryland General Assembly	March 13, 1778	April 22, 1778	?
177	177th Maryland General Assembly	June 1, 1778	June 23, 1778	?
178	178th Maryland General Assembly	October 19, 1778	December 15, 1778	?
179	179th Maryland General Assembly	March 2, 1779	March 25, 1779	?
180	180th Maryland General Assembly	July 15, 1779	August 15, 1779	?
181	181st Maryland General Assembly	November 1, 1779	December 30, 1779	?
182	182nd Maryland General Assembly	March 2, 1780	May 16, 1780	?
183	183rd Maryland General Assembly	June 7, 1780	July 5, 1780	?
184	184th Maryland General Assembly	October 17, 1780	February 2, 1781	?
185	185th Maryland General Assembly	May 10, 1781	June 27, 1781	?
186	186th Maryland General Assembly	November 5, 1781	January 22, 1782	?
187	187th Maryland General Assembly	April 25, 1782	June 15, 1782	?
188	188th Maryland General Assembly	November 4, 1782	January 15, 1783	?
189	189th Maryland General Assembly	April 21, 1783	June 1, 1783	?
190	190th Maryland General Assembly	November 3, 1783	December 26, 1783	?
191	191st Maryland General Assembly	November 1, 1784	January 22, 1785	?
192	192nd Maryland General Assembly	November 7, 1785	March 12, 1785	?
193	193rd Maryland General Assembly	November 6, 1786	January 20, 1787	?
194	194th Maryland General Assembly	April 10, 1787	May 26, 1787	?
195	195th Maryland General Assembly	November 5, 1787	December 17, 1787	1787
196	196th Maryland General Assembly	May 12, 1788	May 27, 1788	1787
197	197th Maryland General Assembly	November 3, 1788	December 23, 1788	1788
198	198th Maryland General Assembly	November 2, 1789	December 25, 1789	1789
199	199th Maryland General Assembly	November 1, 1790	December 22, 1790	1790
200	200th Maryland General Assembly	November 7, 1791	December 30, 1791	1791
201	200th Maryland General Assembly (special session)	April 2, 1792	April 6, 1792	1791
202	202nd Maryland General Assembly	November 5, 1792	December 23, 1792	1792
203	203rd Maryland General Assembly	November 4, 1793	December 29, 1793	1793
204	204th Maryland General Assembly	November 3, 1794	December 27, 1794	1794
205	205th Maryland General Assembly	November 2, 1795	December 24, 1795	1795
206	206th Maryland General Assembly	November 7, 1796	December 31, 1796	1796
207	207th Maryland General Assembly	November 6, 1797	January 21, 1798	1797
208	208th Maryland General Assembly	November 5, 1798	January 20, 1799	1798
209	209th Maryland General Assembly	November 4, 1799	January 3, 1800	1799
210		November 3, 1800	December 19, 1800	
211		November 2, 1801	December 31, 1801	
212		November 1, 1802	January 11, 1803	
213		November 7, 1803	January 7, 1804	
214		November 5, 1804	January 20, 1805	
215		November 4, 1805	January 28, 1806	
216		November 3, 1806	January 5, 1807	
217		November 2, 1807	January 20, 1808	
218		November 7, 1808	December 25, 1808	
219	special session	June 5, 1809	June 10, 1809	
220		November 6, 1809	January 8, 1810	
221		November 5, 1810	December 25, 1810	
222		November 4, 1811	January 7, 1812	
223	special session	June 15, 1812	June 18, 1812	
224		November 2, 1812	January 2, 1813	
225	special session	May 17, 1813	May 30, 1813	
226		December 6, 1813	January 31, 1814	
227		December 5, 1814	February 3, 1815	
228		December 4, 1815	January 30, 1816	
229		December 2, 1816	February 5, 1817	
230		December 1, 1817	February 16, 1818	
231		December 7, 1818	February 19, 1819	
232		December 6, 1819	February 15, 1820	
233		December 4, 1820	February 19, 1821	
234		December 3, 1821	February 23, 1822	
235		December 2, 1822	February 24, 1823	
236		December 1, 1823	February 26, 1824	
237		December 6, 1824	February 26, 1825	
238		December 26, 1825	March 9, 1826	
239		December 26, 1826	March 13, 1827	
240		December 31, 1827	March 16, 1828	
241		December 29, 1828	March 14, 1829	
242		December 28, 1829	March 1, 1830	
243		December 27, 1830	February 24, 1831	
244		December 26, 1831	March 14, 1832	
245		December 31, 1832	March 23, 1833	
246		December 30, 1833	March 15, 1834	
247		December 29, 1834	March 29, 1835	
248		December 28, 1835	April 4, 1836	
249	special session	May 23, 1836	June 4, 1836	
250	special session	November 21, 1836	November 26, 1836	
251		December 26, 1836	March 22, 1837	
252		December 25, 1837	March 30, 1838	
253		December 31, 1838	April 6, 1839	
254		December 30, 1839	March 21, 1840	
255		December 28, 1840	March 10, 1841	
256	special session	March 24, 1841	April 7, 1841	
257		December 27, 1841	1842, March 10	
258		December 26, 1842	March 10, 1843	
259		December 25, 1843	March 9, 1844	
260		December 30, 1844	March 10, 1845	
261		December 29, 1845	March 10, 1846	
262		December 28, 1846	March 10, 1847	
263		December 27, 1847	March 10, 1848	
264		December 31, 1849	March 9, 1850	
265		January 7, 1852	May 31, 1852	
266	special session	January 5, 1853	May 31, 1853	
267		January 4, 1854	March 10, 1854	
268		January 2, 1856	March 10, 1856	
269		January 6, 1858	March 10, 1858	
270		January 4, 1860	March 10, 1860	
271	special session	April 26, 1861	May 14, 1861	
272	special session	June 4, 1861	June 25, 1861	
273	special session	July 30, 1861	August 7, 1861	
274	special session	December 3, 1861	December 24, 1861	
275		January 1, 1862	March 10, 1862	
276		January 6, 1864	March 10, 1864	
277		January 4, 1865	March 24, 1865	
278	special session	January 10, 1866	February 8, 1866	
279		January 2, 1867	March 23, 1867	
280		January 1, 1868	March 30, 1868	
281		January 5, 1870	April 4, 1870	
282		January 3, 1872	April 1, 1872	
283		January 7, 1874	April 6, 1874	
284		January 5, 1876	April 3, 1876	
285	special session	April 20, 1876	April 21, 1876	
286		January 2, 1878	April 1, 1878	
287		January 7, 1880	April 5, 1880	
288		January 4, 1882	April 3, 1882	
289		January 2, 1884	March 31, 1884	
290		January 6, 1886	April 5, 1886	
291		January 8, 1888	April 2, 1888	
292		January 1, 1890	March 31, 1890	
293		January 6, 1892	April 4, 1892	
294		January 3, 1894	April 2, 1894	
295		January 1, 1896	March 30, 1896	
296		January 5, 1898	April 4, 1898	
297		January 3, 1900	April 2, 1900	
298	special session	March 6, 1901	March 28, 1901	
299		January 1, 1902	March 31, 1902	
300	special session	April 16, 1902	April 16, 1902	
301		January 6, 1904	April 4, 1904	
302		January 3, 1906	April 2, 1906	
303		January 1, 1908	March 30, 1908	
304		January 5, 1910	April 4, 1910	
305		January 3, 1912	April 1, 1912	
306		January 7, 1914	April 6, 1914	
307		January 5, 1916	April 3, 1916	
308	special session	June 12, 1917	June 27, 1917	
309		January 2, 1918	April 1, 1918	
310		January 7, 1920	April 5, 1920	
311	special session	September 20, 1920	September 22, 1920	
312		January 4, 1922	April 3, 1922	
313		January 2, 1924	March 31, 1924	
314		January 5, 1927	April 4, 1927	
315		January 2, 1929	April 1, 1929	
316	special session	July 29, 1930	July 29, 1930	
317		January 7, 1931	April 6, 1931	
318		January 4, 1933	April 3, 1933	
319	special session	November 23, 1933	December 11, 1933	
320		January 2, 1935	April 1, 1935	
321	special session	March 4, 1936	April 2, 1936	
322	special session	December 8, 1936	December 12, 1936	
323		January 6, 1937	April 5, 1937	
324	special session	April 22, 1937	May 6, 1937	
325		January 4, 1939	April 3, 1939	
326		January 1, 1941	March 31, 1941	
327		January 6, 1943	April 3, 1943	
328	special session	March 6, 1944	March 10, 1944	
329		January 3, 1945	March 30, 1945	
330	special session	November 5, 1945	November 5, 1945	
331	special session	December 27, 1946	December 27, 1946	
332		January 1, 1947	March 31, 1947	
333	special session	November 5, 1947	November 7, 1947	
334	special session	May 25, 1948	May 27, 1948	
335		January 5, 1949	April 4, 1949	
336	special session	December 17, 1949	December 17, 1949	
337		February 1, 1950	March 2, 1950	
338	special session	July 27, 1950	July 27, 1950	
339	special session	November 10, 1950	November 10, 1950	
340		January 3, 1951	April 2, 1951	
341		February 6, 1952	March 6, 1952	
342		January 7, 1953	April 6, 1953	
343		February 3, 1954	March 4, 1954	
344		January 5, 1955	April 4, 1955	
345		February 1, 1956	March 1, 1956	
346	special session	March 8, 1956	March 8, 1956	
347		January 2, 1957	April 1, 1957	
348		February 5, 1958	March 6, 1958	
349	special session	March 13, 1958	March 13, 1958	
350	special session	June 13, 1958	June 13, 1958	
351		January 7, 1959	April 4, 1959	
352		February 3, 1960	March 3, 1960	
353		January 4, 1961	April 1, 1961	
354	special session	June 9, 1961	June 9, 1961	
355		February 7, 1962	March 8, 1962	
356	special session	March 9, 1962	March 9, 1962	
357	special session	May 25, 1962	May 31, 1962	
358		January 2, 1963	April 1, 1963	
359		February 5, 1964	March 5, 1964	
360		March 11, 1964	March 14, 1964	
361	special session	November 6, 1964	November 6, 1964	
362		January 20, 1965	March 30, 1965	
363	special session	October 11, 1965	October 21, 1965	
364		January 19, 1966	March 29, 1966	
365	special session	March 30, 1966	April 5, 1966	
366		January 18, 1967	March 28, 1967	
367	special session	June 22, 1967	June 22, 1967	
368		January 17, 1968	March 26, 1968	
369	special session	January 6, 1969	January 7, 1969	
370		January 15, 1969	March 25, 1969	
371	special session	December 16, 1969	December 17, 1969	
372		January 21, 1970	March 31, 1970	
373		January 13, 1971	April 12, 1971	
374	special session	June 29, 1971	July 2, 1971	
375		January 12, 1972	April 8, 1972	
376		January 10, 1973	April 9, 1973	
377	special session	July 30, 1973	August 23, 1973	
378	special session	November 9, 1973	November 12, 1973	
379		January 9, 1974	April 8, 1974	
380		January 8, 1975	April 7, 1975	
381	special session	May 12, 1975	May 12, 1975	
382		January 14, 1976	April 12, 1976	
383		January 12, 1977	April 11, 1977	
384		January 11, 1978	April 10, 1978	
385		January 10, 1979	April 9, 1979	
386		January 9, 1980	April 7, 1980	
387		January 14, 1981	April 13, 1981	
388		January 13, 1982	April 12, 1982	
389	special session	August 6, 1982	August 6, 1982	
390		January 12, 1983	April 11, 1983	
391	special session	June 12, 1983	June 12, 1983	
392		January 11, 1984	April 9, 1984	
393		January 9, 1985	April 8, 1985	
394	special session	May 17, 1985	May 17, 1985	
395	special session	October 17, 1985	November 5, 1985	
396		January 8, 1986	April 7, 1986	
397		January 14, 1987	April 13, 1987	
398		January 13, 1988	April 11, 1988	
399		January 11, 1989	April 10, 1989	
400		January 10, 1990	April 9, 1990	
401		January 9, 1991	April 8, 1991	
402	special session	June 26, 1991	June 26, 1991	
403	special session	September 25, 1991	October 22, 1991	
404		January 8, 1992	April 10, 1992	
405	special session	April 10, 1992	April 10, 1992	
406	special session	November 18, 1992	November 18, 1992	
407		January 13, 1993	April 12, 1993	
408		January 12, 1994	April 11, 1994	
409		January 11, 1995	April 10, 1995	
410		January 10, 1996	April 8, 1996	
411		January 8, 1997	April 7, 1997	
412		January 14, 1998	April 13, 1998	
413		January 13, 1999	April 12, 1999	
414		January 12, 2000	April 10, 2000	
415		January 10, 2001	April 9, 2001	
416		January 9, 2002	April 8, 2002	
417		January 8, 2003	April 7, 2003	
418		January 14, 2004	April 12, 2004	
419	special session	December 28, 2004	January 11, 2005	
420		January 12, 2005	April 11, 2005	
421		January 11, 2006	April 10, 2006	
422	422nd Maryland General Assembly (special session)	June 14, 2006	June 23, 2006	
423	423rd Maryland General Assembly	January 10, 2007	April 9, 2007	November 7, 2006: House, Senate
424	424th Maryland General Assembly	October 29, 2007	November 19, 2007	November 7, 2006: House, Senate
425	425th Maryland General Assembly	January 9, 2008	April 7, 2008	November 7, 2006: House, Senate
426	426th Maryland General Assembly	January 14, 2009	April 13, 2009	November 7, 2006: House, Senate
427	427th Maryland General Assembly	January 13, 2010	April 12, 2010	November 7, 2006: House, Senate
428	428th Maryland General Assembly	January 12, 2011	April 11, 2011	November 2, 2010: House, Senate
429	special session	October 17, 2011	October 20, 2011	November 2, 2010: House, Senate
430		January 11, 2012	April 9, 2012	November 2, 2010: House, Senate
431	special session	May 14, 2012	May 16, 2012	November 2, 2010: House, Senate
432	special session	August 9, 2012	August 15, 2012	November 2, 2010: House, Senate
433		January 9, 2013	April 8, 2013	November 2, 2010: House, Senate
434		January 8, 2014	April 7, 2014	November 2, 2010: House, Senate
435		January 14, 2015	April 13, 2015	November 4, 2014: House, Senate
436		January 13, 2016	April 11, 2016	November 4, 2014: House, Senate
437		January 11, 2017	April 10, 2017	November 4, 2014: House, Senate
438		January 10, 2018	April 9, 2018	November 4, 2014: House, Senate
439		2019		November 6, 2018: House, Senate
440		2019		November 6, 2018: House, Senate
441		2020		November 6, 2018: House, Senate
442		2021		November 6, 2018: House, Senate
443		2021		November 6, 2018: House, Senate
444		2022		November 6, 2018: House, Senate
445		2023		November 8, 2022: House, Senate
446		2024		November 8, 2022: House, Senate
447		2025		November 8, 2022: House, Senate

== See also ==
- List of speakers of the Maryland House of Delegates
- List of presidents of the Maryland Senate
- List of governors of Maryland
- Constitution of Maryland
- Politics of Maryland
- Elections in Maryland
- Maryland State Capitol
- Historical outline of Maryland
- Lists of United States state legislative sessions
