= Tanya Thornton Shewell =

American politician

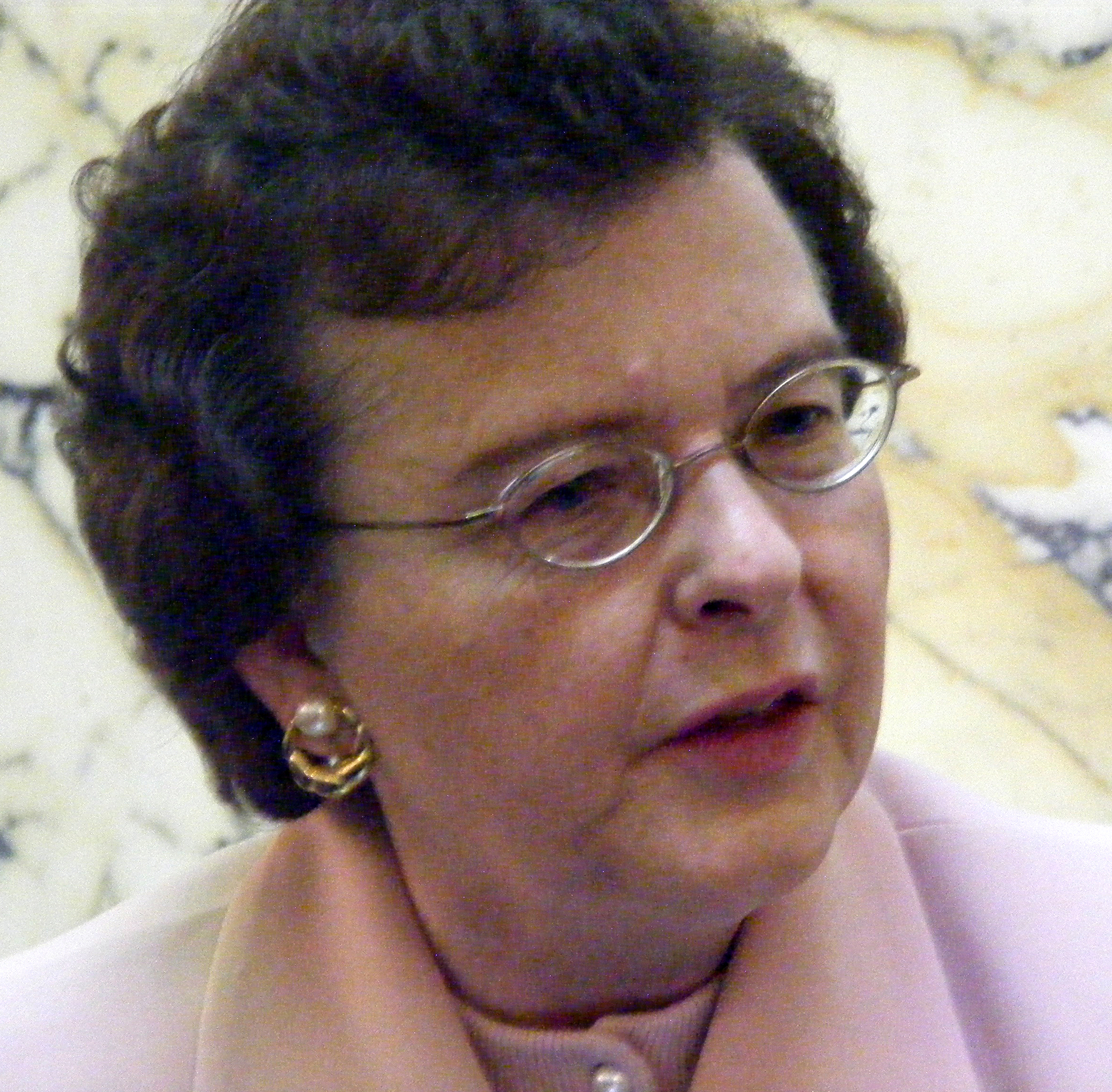

Delegate Maryland District 5A
- In office August 17, 2004 – January 12, 2011
- Preceded by: Carmen Amedori
- Succeeded by: Justin Ready

Personal details
- Born: March 9, 1944 (age 82) Piqua, Ohio, U.S.
- Party: Republican

Tanya Thornton Shewell (born March 9, 1944) is an American politician and former member of the Maryland House of Delegates.

== Background ==
Tanya Shewell replaced Carmen Amedori when she was appointed to the Parole Commission by Governor Bob Ehrlich in 2004. In 2007, she became the Deputy Minority Whip in the Maryland House of Delegates. Shewell represents District 5A, which covers Carroll County, MD.

== Personal life ==
Tanya Shewell attended Troy High School in Troy, OH and graduated as valedictorian. She graduated in 1970 from Towson State University, summa cum laude, with a B.S. in psychology and sociology. She is married with two children.

== Career ==
Tanya Shewell is the manager/owner of a family rental property business, Shewell Enterprises, since 1969. She worked for the State Department of Education at the Division of Vocational Rehabilitation from 1970 to 1977, and the Carroll Lutheran Health Care Center from 1981 to 1983. In addition, she was the Executive Director of Granite House Inc. from 1983 to 1991.

=== Legislative Notes ===
- voted against in-state tuition for illegal immigrants in 2007 (HB6)

== Election results ==
- 2006 Race for Maryland House of Delegates – District 5A

Voters to choose two:

Name	Votes	Percent	Outcome
Tanya Thornton Shewell, Rep.	18,785	32.9%	Won
Nancy R. Stocksdale, Rep.	20,630	36.1%	Won
Ann Darrin, Dem.	9,489	16.6%	Lost
Frank Henry Rammes, Dem.	8,192	14.3%	Lost
Other Write-Ins	57	0.1%	Lost

== Bibliography ==
- "Tanya Thornton Shewell, Maryland State Delegate". www.msa.md.gov. Archived from the original on March 1, 2010.
