= Michael G. Lenett =

American politician

Maryland State Senate
- In office 2007–2010
- Constituency: District 19, Montgomery County

Personal details
- Born: February 24, 1962 (age 64) New York City, New York, U.S.
- Party: Democratic
- Occupation: Attorney

Michael G. Lenett is an American former politician from Maryland and a member of the Democratic Party. He lost the Democratic primary election for renomination to his Maryland State Senate to sitting Delegate Roger Manno 54% to 46%. Lenett's term expired December 31, 2010. He represented Maryland's district 19 in Montgomery County.

Born in New York City, Lenett received a B.A. from Brandeis University and an M.A. from Georgetown University before attending the Georgetown University Law Center for a J.D. and an LL.M. degree. He was a professor at George Washington University's National Law Center, and worked for the firm Cuneo, Gilbert & LaDuca.
