= William A. Bronrott =

American politician

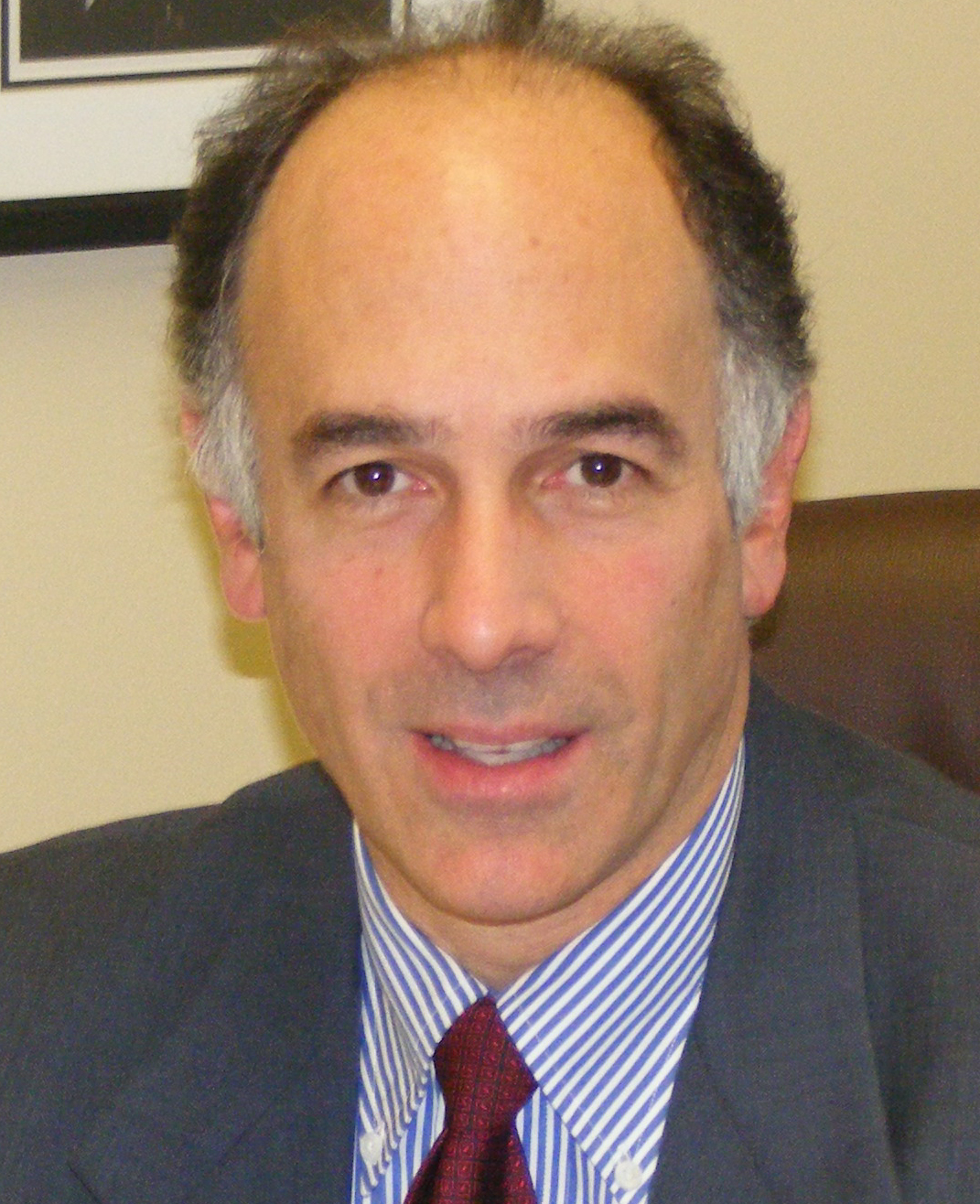

Member of the Maryland House of Delegates from the 16th district
- In office January 13, 1999 – April 26, 2010
- Succeeded by: Karen Britto
- Constituency: Montgomery County

Personal details
- Born: June 30, 1955 (age 71) Washington, D.C., U.S.
- Party: Democratic
- Education: University of Maryland (B.A., M.A.)
- Occupation: Deputy Administrator, Federal Motor Carrier Safety Administration, U.S. Department of Transportation

William A. "Bill" Bronrott (born 1955) served in the Maryland House of Delegates from January 13, 1999, until April 26, 2010, representing Maryland's District 16 in Montgomery County. He stepped down from his seat in the General Assembly to accept a presidential appointment as Deputy Administrator of the Federal Motor Carrier Safety Administration at the United States Department of Transportation.

== Early life and education ==
Bronrott was born in Washington, D.C., on June 30, 1955. He graduated from Montgomery Blair High School in Silver Spring before earning a Bachelor of Arts degree in communications and a Master of Arts degree in political communication from the University of Maryland, College Park.

== Career ==
Prior to being elected to the Maryland House of Delegates, Bronrott worked on Capitol Hill as press secretary for Congressman Michael D. Barnes from 1979 to 1987, and then founded his own communications firm, Bronrott Communications
