= Gerron Levi =

American politician

Gerron S. Levi
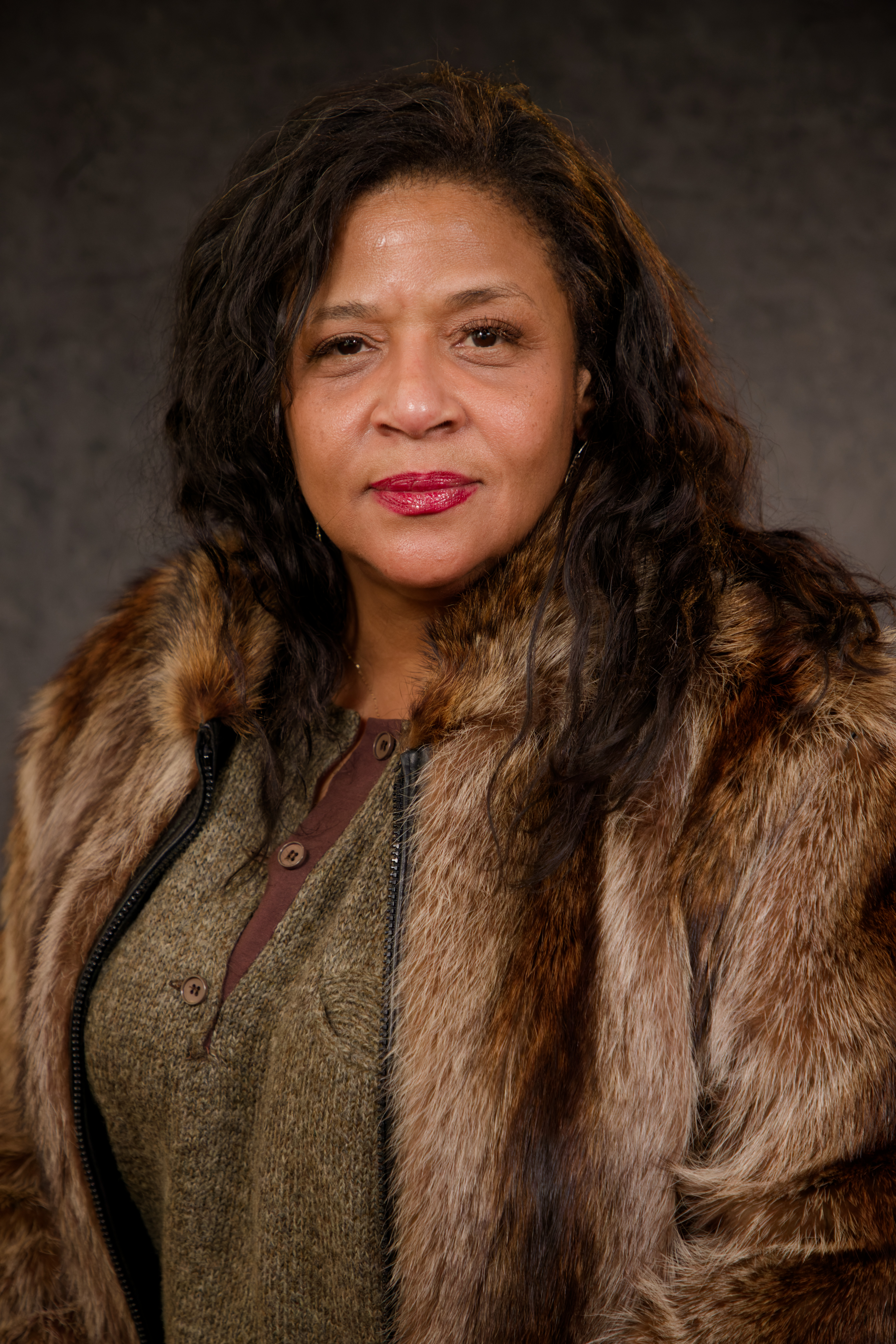

Maryland House of Delegates
- In office 2007–2011
- Preceded by: Mary Conroy (D)
- Succeeded by: Geraldine Valentino-Smith
- Constituency: Prince George's County

Personal details
- Born: Chicago, Illinois, U.S.
- Party: Democratic
- Education: University of California, Berkeley (BA); Howard University School of Law (JD)
- Occupation: Lobbyist, attorney

Gerron S. Levi is an American politician who represented district 23A in the Maryland House of Delegates.

== Background ==
Levi was born in Chicago, Illinois. She received her B.A. from the University of California at Berkeley. During college she served as a research assistant for the Institute of Governmental Studies. After college she went to Washington, D.C., to work on Capitol Hill and to go to law school. While at the Howard University Law School she worked as a legislative assistant and intern to U.S. Representative Gus Savage of Illinois and legislative assistant to U.S. Senator Dianne Feinstein of California. She was awarded her Juris Doctor and was admitted to the Illinois Bar.

== Career ==
She has been the senior lobbyist for the Laborers International Union of North America and the deputy director of legislation for the AFL-CIO. In 2010, Levi gave up her seat in the House of Delegates to run for county executive of Prince George's County, her campaign was unsuccessful, losing to Rushern Baker.

In 2007, Levi took her seat in the Maryland House of Delegates. She was assigned to the House Judiciary committee and its juvenile law subcommittee. Gerron Levi was a member of the Maryland House of Delegates from 2007-2011 representing Bowie, Mitchellville, Glenn Dale, Lanham-Seabrook and South Laurel in Prince George’s County. During her time in the General Assembly, Gerron served as a member of the Judiciary Committee, House Special Committee on Drug and Alcohol Abuse. She also served as a member of the Maryland Capital Park and Planning Commission Committee in the Prince George’s County Delegation. She was a member of the Legislative Black Caucus of Maryland and the Women Legislators of Maryland.

During her first session in Annapolis as a legislator, she sponsored and saw passed a bill that would limit the ability of minors to get a driving learners permit if they had habitually missed school. Levi was also instrumental in crafting legislation dealing with gangs and gang violence in Maryland. She is also a member of the Legislative Black Caucus of Maryland.

Gerron also spent 15 years in the labor movement, serving as assistant director of the Legislative Department at the AFL-CIO and as Legislative Representative for the Laborers’ International Union of North America (LIUNA).

Currently, Gerron is the policy and government affairs lead at the National Community Reinvestment Coalition (NCRC).

=== Legislative notes ===
- voted for the Clean Indoor Air Act of 2007 (HB359)
- voted in favor of the Tax Reform Act of 2007(HB2)
- primary sponsor- Truancy - Prohibition Against Issuance of Learner's Instructional Permit (HB571 Became Law - Chapter 563)
- sponsored House Bill 30 in 2007-Maryland Education Fund - Establishment and Funding
- Primary Sponsor of Maryland Gang Prosecution Act of 2010
- Primary Sponsor of Ex-Offender Reentry Laws (2009)
- 2007- (in committee) voted for Maryland's Marriage Protection Act.
- 2008- voted against Senate Bills 597 and 566; bills expanding the rights of same sex domestic partners to include shared property recognition, rights pertaining to hospital visitation, shared rooms in nursing homes, and funeral planning.
