= James E. DeGrange Sr. =

American politician (born 1949)

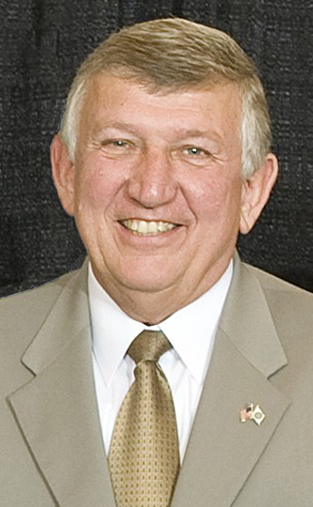

Member of the Maryland Senate from the 32nd district
- In office January 13, 1999 – January 9, 2019
- Preceded by: C. Edward Middlebrooks
- Succeeded by: Pamela Beidle

Anne Arundel County Council
- In office 1994–1998

Personal details
- Born: September 24, 1949 (age 76) Baltimore, Maryland, U.S.
- Party: Democratic
- Occupation: Businessman

James Edward DeGrange Sr. (born September 24, 1949) is an American politician from Maryland and a member of the Democratic Party. He completed his third term in the Maryland State Senate, representing Maryland's district 32 in Anne Arundel County, at the end of 2018.

== Background ==
DeGrange was born in Baltimore, Maryland, but grew up in Anne Arundel County. He graduated from Glen Burnie High School in 1968 and attended Anne Arundel Community College. He served in the United States Army Reserve from 1968 to 1974. He is the Vice-President of the DeGrange Lumber Company.

== Political career ==
DeGrange's political career began with his service on the Maryland Lottery Commission, on which he served from 1991 to 1999. In 1994, he was elected to serve on the Anne Arundel County Council. After one term on the council, he ran for and won the district 32 seat in the State Senate. DeGrange sat on the Budget and Taxation Committee and served as Vice-Chair of the Executive Nominations Committee.

DeGrange currently lives in Baywood, Delaware. He is Catholic.
