= James W. Hubbard =

American politician

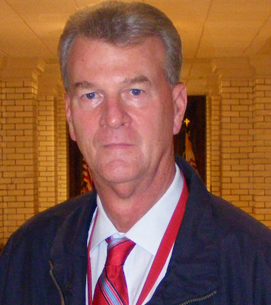

Member of the Maryland House of Delegates from District 23A
- In office November 1992 – January 14, 2015

Personal details
- Born: March 20, 1948 Washington, D.C.
- Died: July 12, 2022 (aged 74) Delaware
- Party: Democratic

James W. Hubbard (March 20, 1948 – July 12, 2022) was an American politician who represents district 23A in the Maryland House of Delegates.

== Background ==
Delegate Hubbard was born in Washington, D.C., on March 20, 1948; he graduated from the University of Maryland with a B.A. in 1986.

== In the legislature ==
- He voted in favor of increasing the sales tax by 20% - Tax Reform Act of 2007(HB2)
- He voted in favor of in-state tuition for illegal immigrants in 2007 (HB6)
