= Caylin Young =

American politician (born 1987)

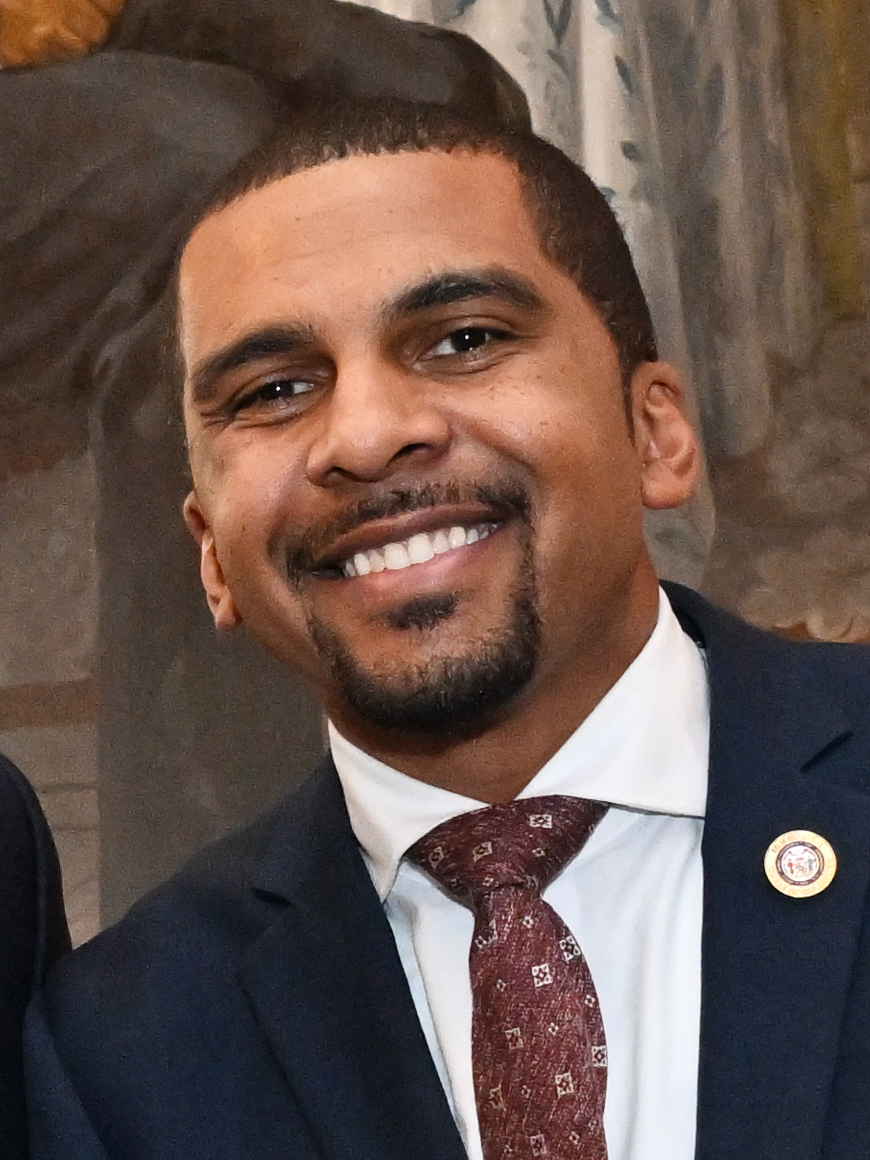
- Young in 2023

Member of the Maryland House of Delegates from the 45th district
- Incumbent
- Assumed office January 11, 2023 Serving with Stephanie M. Smith and Jackie Addison
- Preceded by: Chanel Branch

Personal details
- Born: October 18, 1987 (age 38) Baltimore, Maryland, U.S.
- Party: Democratic
- Occupation: Public policy advisor
- Website: Campaign website

Caylin A. Young (born October 18, 1987) is an American politician. He is a member of the Maryland House of Delegates for District 45 in Baltimore City. He previously served as the public policy director of the American Civil Liberties Union of Maryland.

== Background ==
Young graduated from Hampton University with a Bachelor's degree in mathematics. He later attended the University of Baltimore School of Law, where he earned his Juris Doctor degree.

Young interned for the Maryland Court of Appeals, served as a legal fellow to U.S. Senator Cory Booker, and was a legislative assistant for former state senator Nathaniel J. McFadden and former state delegate Cheryl Glenn. He also served as the legislative director for then-Baltimore City Council president Brandon Scott. From January to December 2021, Young served as the director of public policy for the American Civil Liberties Union of Maryland, afterwards serving as the deputy director for the Baltimore City Office of Equity and Civil Rights until January 2026.

In 2018, Young unsuccessfully ran for the Maryland House of Delegates in District 45, coming in fourth place with 12.1 percent of the vote. In December 2019, he applied to fill a vacancy in the Maryland House of Delegates to serve the rest of the term of state delegate Cheryl Glenn, who resigned and pleaded guilty to federal corruption charges. In January 2020, the Baltimore City Democratic Central Committee voted to nominate Chanel Branch to the seat, with Young placing second behind Branch. After the controversial vote, Young sought legal advice to challenge the results, arguing that succession votes have traditionally required four votes, whereas Branch got three. In 2022, Young ran for the Maryland House of Delegates in District 45, running on a ticket with state senator Cory McCray and Jackie Addison, a community activist. He won the Democratic primary on July 19, narrowly defeating Branch by 116 votes.

== In the legislature ==
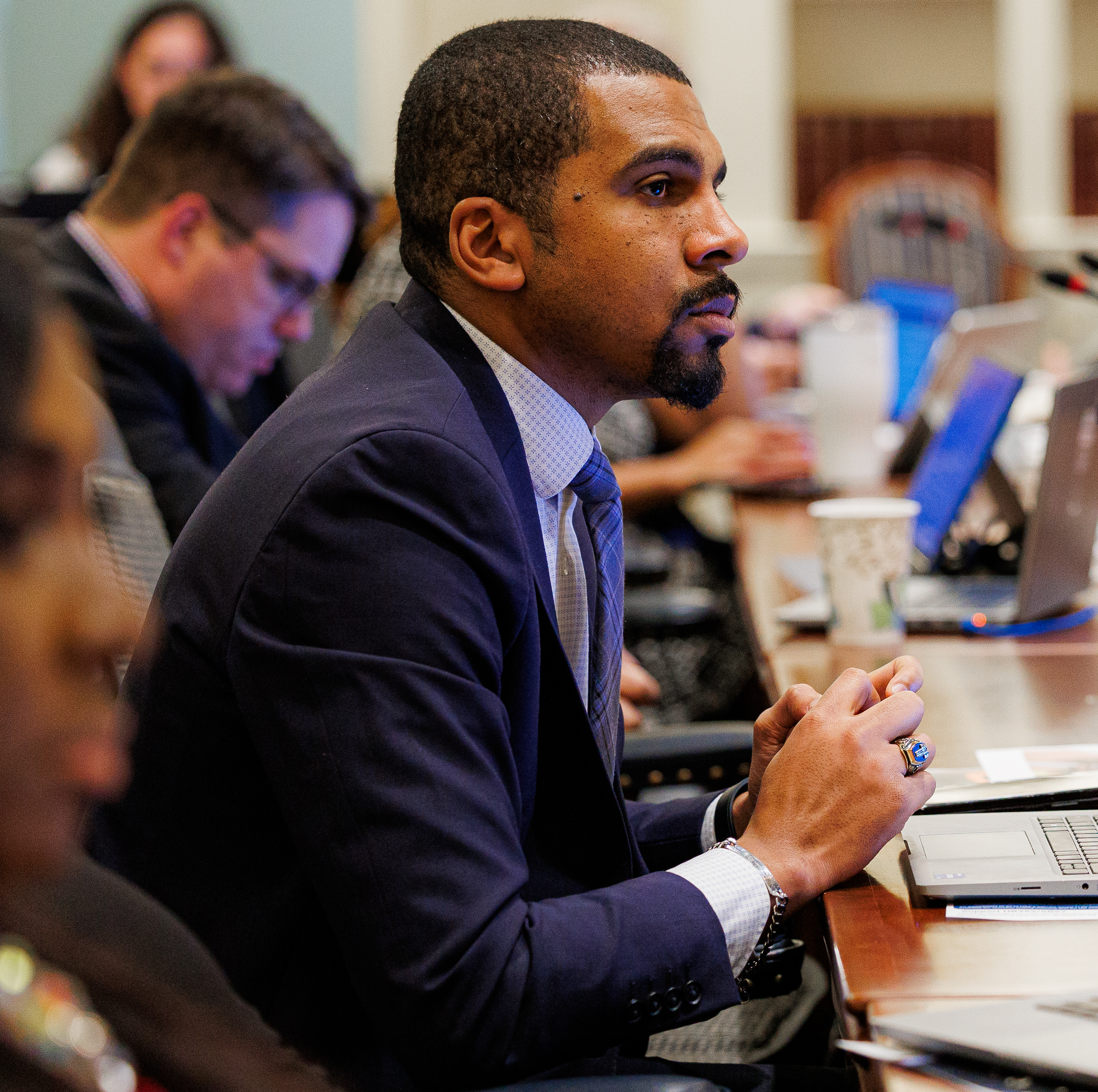
Young in the Ways and Means Committee, 2024

Young was sworn into the Maryland House of Delegates on January 11, 2023. He is a member of the House Judiciary Committee. In February 2026, Young, alongside state delegates Sean Stinnett and Sarah Wolek, established the Maryland Muslim Caucus.

== Political positions ==
In January 2024, Young attended and spoke at a rally at the Maryland State House to support a resolution calling on Maryland's congressional delegation to support a ceasefire in the Gaza war. During the 2026 legislative session, he supported the Not On Our Dime Act, which would require the Maryland Secretary of State to remove nonprofit organizations from the state's Registry of Charitable Solicitation if they knowingly support Israeli settlement activity.

== Personal life ==
Young's twin brother, Calvin Young III, is the former chief of staff to Baltimore mayor Brandon Scott. He is a fan of the Baltimore Ravens.

=== Legal troubles ===
In 2023, Young was twice accused of domestic violence by two different women, but the charges were dismissed after judges found there was "no statutory basis for relief". In January 2026, Young was charged with second-degree assault following an incident in which he allegedly yelled at and struck a woman in the chest with a closed fist following an argument on New Year's Day. Prosecutors dropped all charges against Young in February 2026.

In March 2026, Baltimore Police Department footage was released from a domestic incident on New Years' Eve in December 2025 after a woman called the police when Young refused to return their 2-year-old child during a phone call. According to the woman, Young had allegedly removed her doorbell camera during a confrontation outside her residence the day prior. Young repeatedly identified himself to police as a state delegate and told one officer "I don't think I'm above the law. I'm on top."

== Electoral history ==
Baltimore City Democratic Central Committee District 45 election, 2014
Party	Candidate	Votes	%
Democratic	Melissa "Mel B." Bagley	4,730	8.4
Democratic	Sharon McCollough	4,448	7.9
Democratic	Brandon Scott	4,386	7.8
Democratic	Antonio "Tony" Glover	4,110	7.3
Democratic	Nina R. Harper	4,021	7.1
Democratic	Eric Booker	3,608	6.4
Democratic	Ronald N. Bailey	3,473	6.2
Democratic	Margie Fleming Brinkley	3,324	5.9
Democratic	Chanel Branch	3,288	5.8
Democratic	Caylin Young	2,934	5.2
Democratic	Marques Dent	2,750	4.9
Democratic	Jermaine A. Jones	2,264	4.0
Democratic	Mark Washington	2,172	3.8
Democratic	Steve Daviss	2,096	3.7
Democratic	Caron Brace	1,847	3.3
Democratic	Micah Mitchell	1,749	3.1
Democratic	Martin Edward Davis	1,534	2.7
Democratic	Clarence Tucker	1,426	2.5
Democratic	Charles U. Smith	905	1.6
Democratic	Matthew F. Stegman	786	1.4
Democratic	Samuel Pinkava	612	1.1

Maryland House of Delegates District 45 Democratic primary election, 2018
Party	Candidate	Votes	%
Democratic	Talmadge Branch (incumbent)	6,394	19.6
Democratic	Cheryl Glenn (incumbent)	5,792	17.8
Democratic	Stephanie M. Smith	4,486	13.7
Democratic	Caylin Young	3,955	12.1
Democratic	Sharon McCollough	2,886	8.8
Democratic	Marques Dent	2,705	8.3
Democratic	Rita Church	2,561	7.8
Democratic	Linzy Jackson	1,863	5.7
Democratic	John D. Amankwah	697	2.1
Democratic	George Johnson	686	2.1
Democratic	Andy Pierre	602	1.8

Maryland House of Delegates District 45 Democratic primary election, 2022
Party	Candidate	Votes	%
Democratic	Jackie Addison	9,577	25.3
Democratic	Stephanie M. Smith (incumbent)	8,638	22.9
Democratic	Caylin Young	8,567	22.7
Democratic	Chanel Branch (incumbent)	8,451	22.4
Democratic	George Johnson	2,567	6.8

Maryland House of Delegates District 45 election, 2022
Party	Candidate	Votes	%
Democratic	Stephanie M. Smith (incumbent)	21,161	32.13
Democratic	Jackie Addison	20,912	31.75
Democratic	Caylin Young	19,963	30.31
Republican	Antonio Barboza	3,582	5.44
Write-in		246	0.37
