= Baltimore City Delegation =

Delegation in the Maryland General Assembly

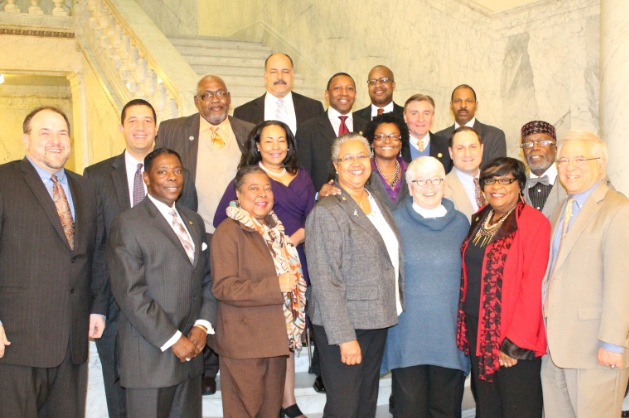
The 2014 Baltimore City Delegation

The Baltimore City Delegation refers to the delegates who are elected from districts in Baltimore to serve in the Maryland House of Delegates in the United States. By 1983, the Baltimore City Delegation had 27 members, 3 each from 9 districts totally within Baltimore City. At the beginning of the 2023 legislative session that number had dropped to 14 members due to a loss in population in Baltimore City.

The chairman of the delegation is chosen via an open ballot by the members of the delegation and usually serves for four years. The delegation usually meets weekly during the regular session of the Maryland General Assembly in the Baltimore City Delegation Room of the Lowe House Office Building in Annapolis. During the legislative interim, May through December, the delegation meets on an as needed basis.

== Authority and responsibilities ==
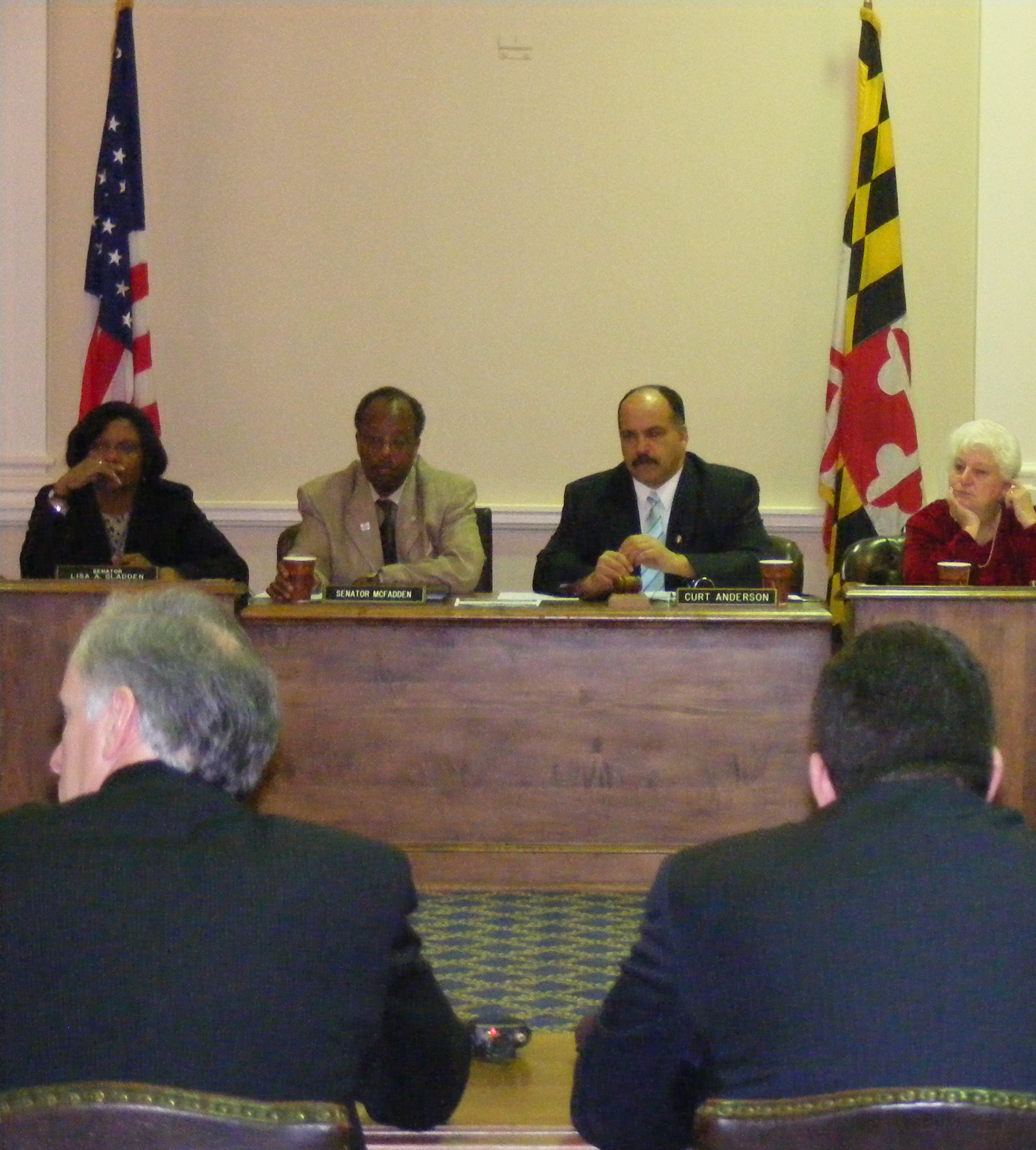

The Baltimore City Delegation is responsible for representing the interests, needs and concerns of the City of Baltimore in the Maryland General Assembly. The first priority has been to ensure that sufficient state funds are granted to the city to support the funding of education and the construction and operation of public school facilities. Additionally, the delegation monitors state transportation trust funds allocated to the city for its transportation infrastructure. Every year, the Mayor of Baltimore provides of list of special projects that need to be funded through state loans (bonds); the Baltimore City Senate Delegation is responsible for passage of those projects in the General Assembly.

== Maryland General Assembly legislative session actions ==
2007 session: briefings/bill hearings

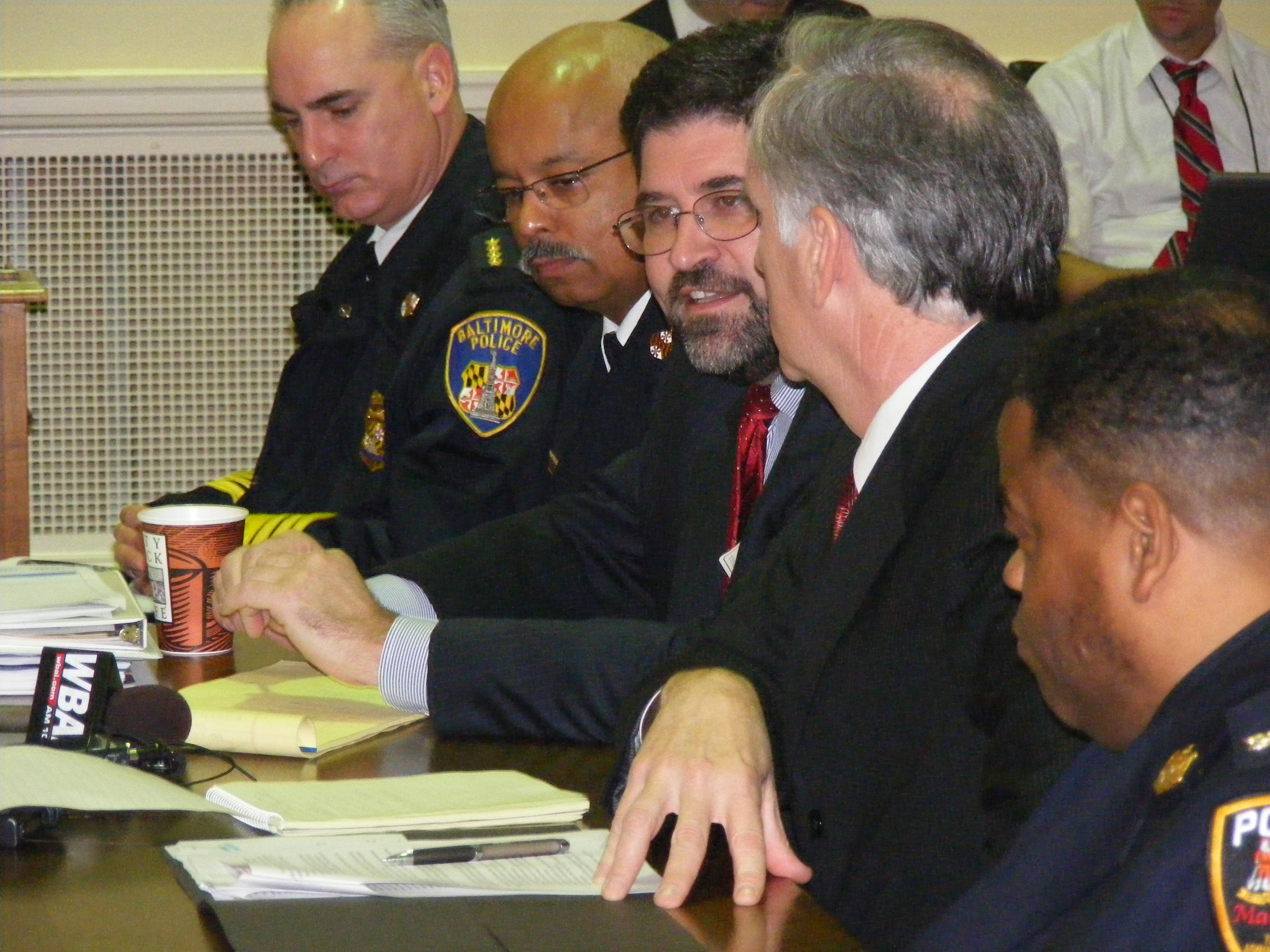
Briefing on violence in Baltimore City Schools from the Police Commissioner, Chief of school security and the CEO of the Baltimore City Public Schools

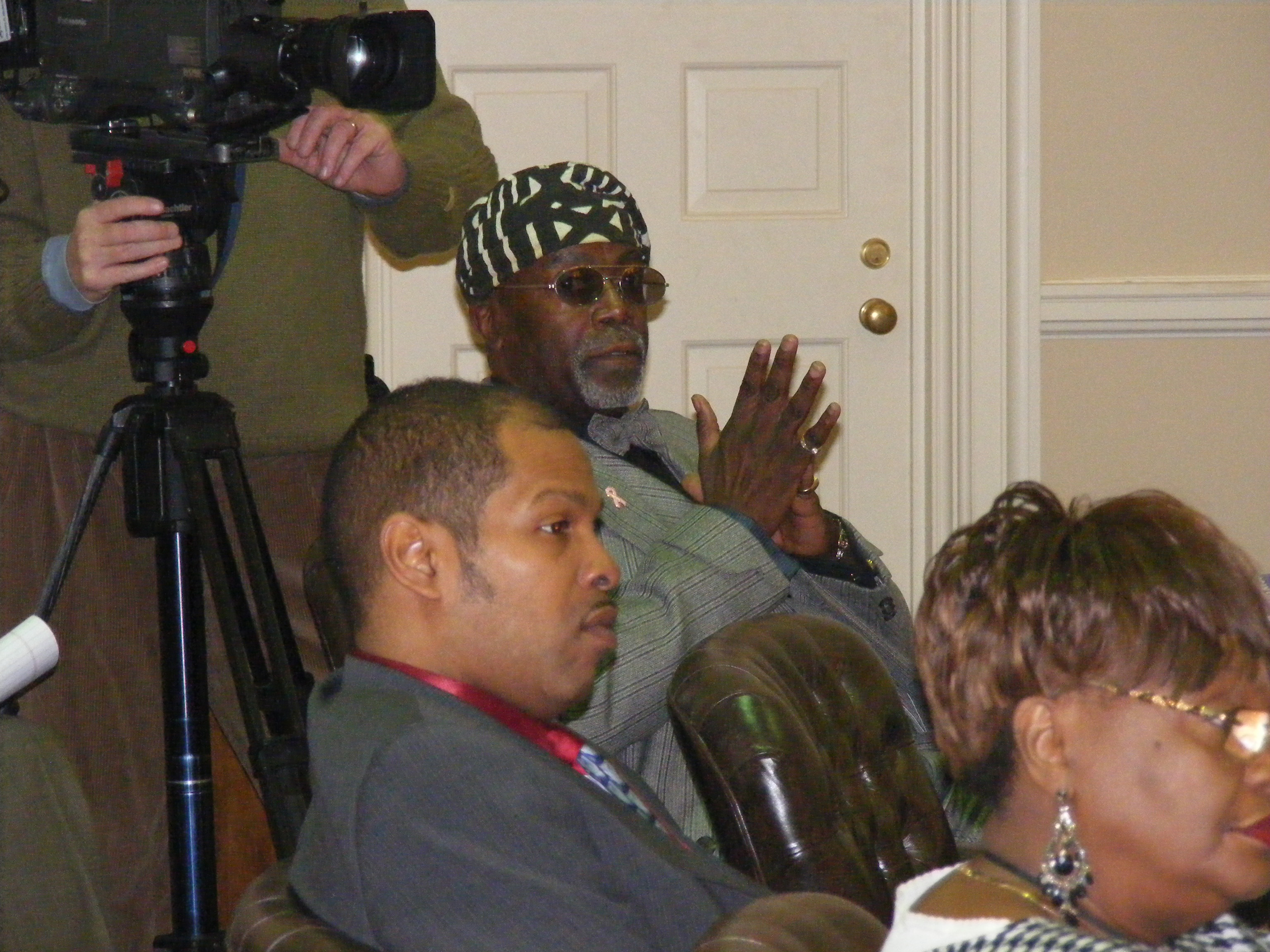
Delegates Oaks, Conaway and Robinson at delegation meeting

During the 90-day session of the 2007 Maryland General Assembly, members of the delegation received briefings from:

- Baltimore City Public School System (BCPSS)
- Mayor Sheila Dixon
- Mayor's Office of Government Relations
- Michael Busch, Speaker of the House
- Patricia Jessamy, State's Attorney for Baltimore City
- Governor Martin O’Malley
- Lori Albin, Office of the Public Defender
- Leonard Hamm, Police Commissioner of Baltimore City
- Dr. Joshua Sharfstein, Health Commissioner of Baltimore City
- William Somerville, Ethics Counsel
- Doug Gansler, Attorney General of MD
- Peter Franchot, Comptroller of MD

2007 Bill hearings

The delegation also conducted hearings on more than 30 bills and voted favorably on the following:

- HB 165 – Del. Rosenberg – Baltimore City – Local Government Tort Claims Act – Baltimore Public Markets Corporation and Lexington Market, Inc.
- HB 251 – Del. Anderson (By Request – Baltimore City Administration) – Baltimore City – Property Tax Credit for Newly Constructed Dwellings
- HB 458 – Del. Tarrant – Ground Rents – Property Owned by Baltimore City – Reimbursement for Expenses – Notices
- HB 762 – Del. Anderson – Baltimore City – Housing Authority – Continued Occupancy by Family Member on Death of Tenant
- HB 813 – Del. Rosenberg – Baltimore City – Property Tax Credit – Inclusionary Housing (Favorable with Amendments)
- HB 769 – Del. Anderson – Disease Prevention – Sexually Transmitted Diseases – Expedited Partner Therapy Pilot Program
- HB 1403 – Del. Olszewski – Critical Area – Construction of a Facility – Prohibition (Favorable with Amendments)
- HB 991 – Del. Anderson (By Request – Baltimore City Administration) – Baltimore City – Hotel Room Tax – Convention Center Promotion
- HB 1167 – Del. Oaks – Baltimore City – Binding Arbitration – Police Officers (Favorable as Amended)
- HB 1017 – Del. Walker – Baltimore City and Prince George's County – Parent-Teacher Association Matching Fund Pilot Program
- SB 861 – Sen. Pugh – Task Force – Urban Senior Care Communities in Baltimore City
- SB 571 – Sen. Della – Baltimore City – 46th Alcoholic Beverages District – Licenses
- SB 16 – Sen. Della – Baltimore City – Local Government Tort Claims Act – Baltimore Public Markets Corporation and Lexington Market, Inc.
- SB 755 – Sen. Gladden – Ground Rents – Property Owned by Baltimore City – Reimbursement for Expenses – Notices (Favorable as Amended)

2008 session: briefings/bill hearings

During the 2008 Legislative Session, the Baltimore City Delegation met for a total of 13 meetings, with the attendance of all Delegates between 90–95%.

Briefings

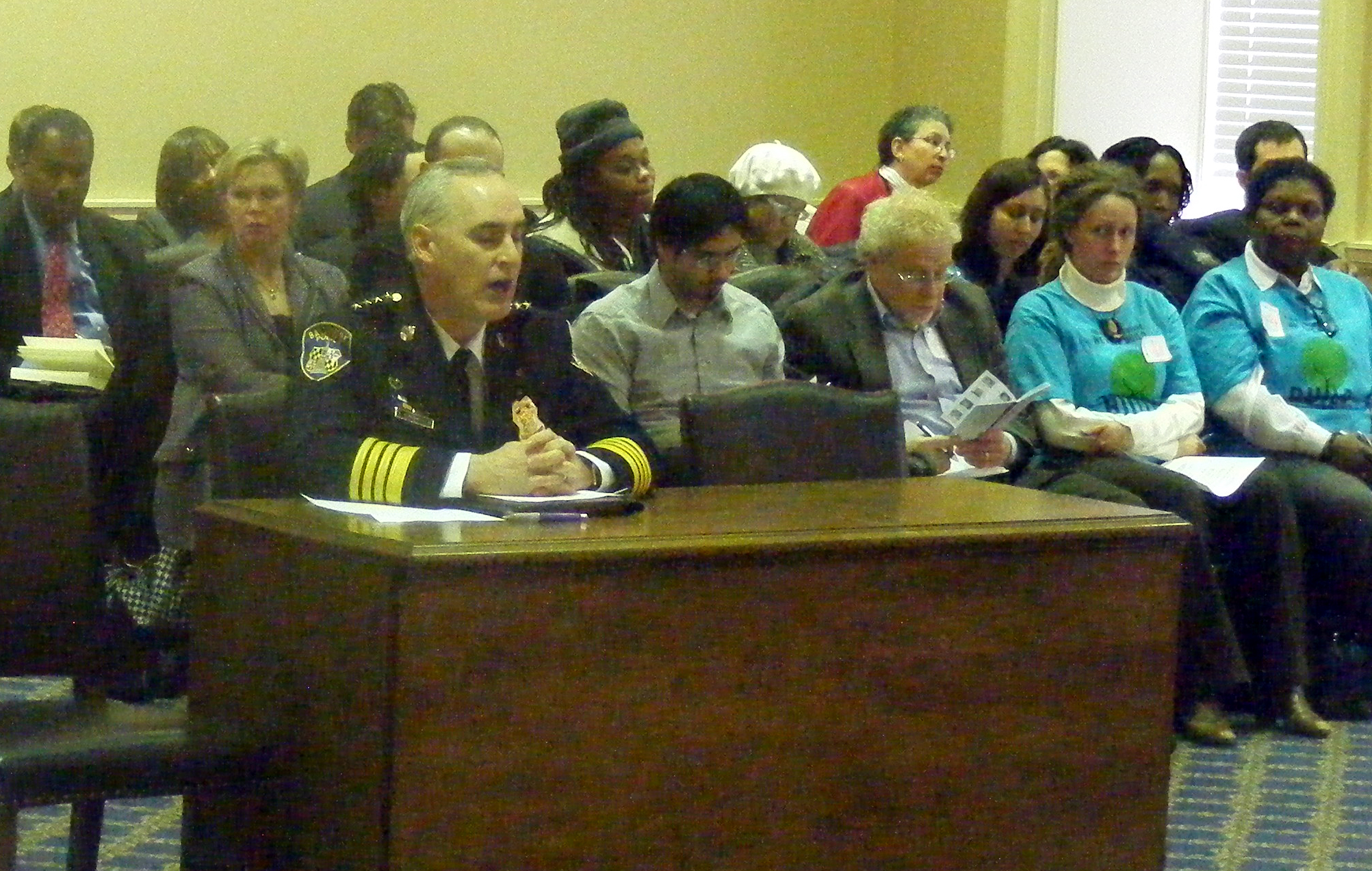
Baltimore City Police Commissioner Fred Bealefeld responds to questioning from the delegation

Throughout the 90-day Session, the Baltimore City Delegation heard from various major City agencies, which briefed the Delegation on the agencies’ 2008 Legislative Priorities.

- Dr. Andres Alonso, CEO – Baltimore City Public School System (BCPSS)
- Baltimore City Mayor's Office
- Michael Busch, Speaker of the House
- Governor Martin O’Malley
- Frederick H. Bealefeld III, Commissioner Baltimore Police Department
- Dr. Joshua Sharfstein, Health Commissioner of Baltimore City
- Doug Gansler, Attorney General of MD
- Peter Franchot, Comptroller of MD
- Lori Albin, Office of the Public Defender
- William Somerville, Ethics Counsel
- Patricia Jessamy, State's Attorney Baltimore City
- Lt. Gov. Anthony Brown

Delegation bills

The Baltimore City Delegation, with the assistance of Delegation Counsel, Karen Morgan, heard the following bills, sponsored by the Baltimore City Administration:

- HB 611 – Underground Facilities – Determination of Marking – Initial Fees (UNF)
- HB 615 – State Government – Custodian of Records – Inspection of Public Records (FAV)
- HB 768 – Children – Records – Access by the Baltimore City Health Department (Became Law)
- HB 849 – Public Safety – Restrictions on Possession of Firearms – Conviction of Disqualifying Crime and Protective Order Respondent (UNF)
- HB 880 – Public Safety – Regulated Firearms – Reporting Lost or Stolen (UNF)
- HB 900 – Criminal Procedure – Restrictions on Pretrial Release – Offenses Involving Firearms – Repeat Offenders (UNF)
- HB 964 – Criminal Procedure – No Good Time For Gun Crime (Recommitted to JUD Committee)
- HB 1441 – Baltimore City – Tax Increment Financing and Special Tax Districts – MEDCO (Became Law)

Baltimore City related bills

The Baltimore City Delegation also heard the following bills which would have either direct or indirect impact on Baltimore City:

- HB 524 – Del. Glenn – Baltimore City – Board of Education – Election of Members (UNF)
- HB 690 – Del. Rosenberg – Baltimore City – Property Tax Credit for Newly Constructed Dwellings – Hillsdale Heights Neighborhood Association Dwellings (UNF)
- HB 298 – Del. Conaway – Baltimore City Board of School Commissioners – System of Public School Buses Required (UNF)
- HB 299 – Del. Conaway – Education – Baltimore City – Public and Private Schools – Criminal Law and Criminal Procedure Courses (UNF)
- HB 1069 – Del. Conaway & Glenn – Baltimore City Circuit Court – Jury Duty – Payment to Jurors (UNF)
- HB 1258 – Del. Carter, et al. – Baltimore City Public Schools – High School Students – Voter Education (Became Law)
- HB 1283 – Del. Haynes, et al. – Baltimore City – Public School Construction – State Funding (UNF)
- HB 1507 – Del. Oaks – Baltimore City – Binding Arbitration – Police Officers (Recommitted to APP Committee)

The last Baltimore City Delegation meeting of the 2008 Legislative Session was held on Friday April 11, 2008 with the Delegation returning an Unfavorable vote for the House Bills which would change the composition of the Baltimore City School Board Commissioners.

2009 session: briefings/bill hearings

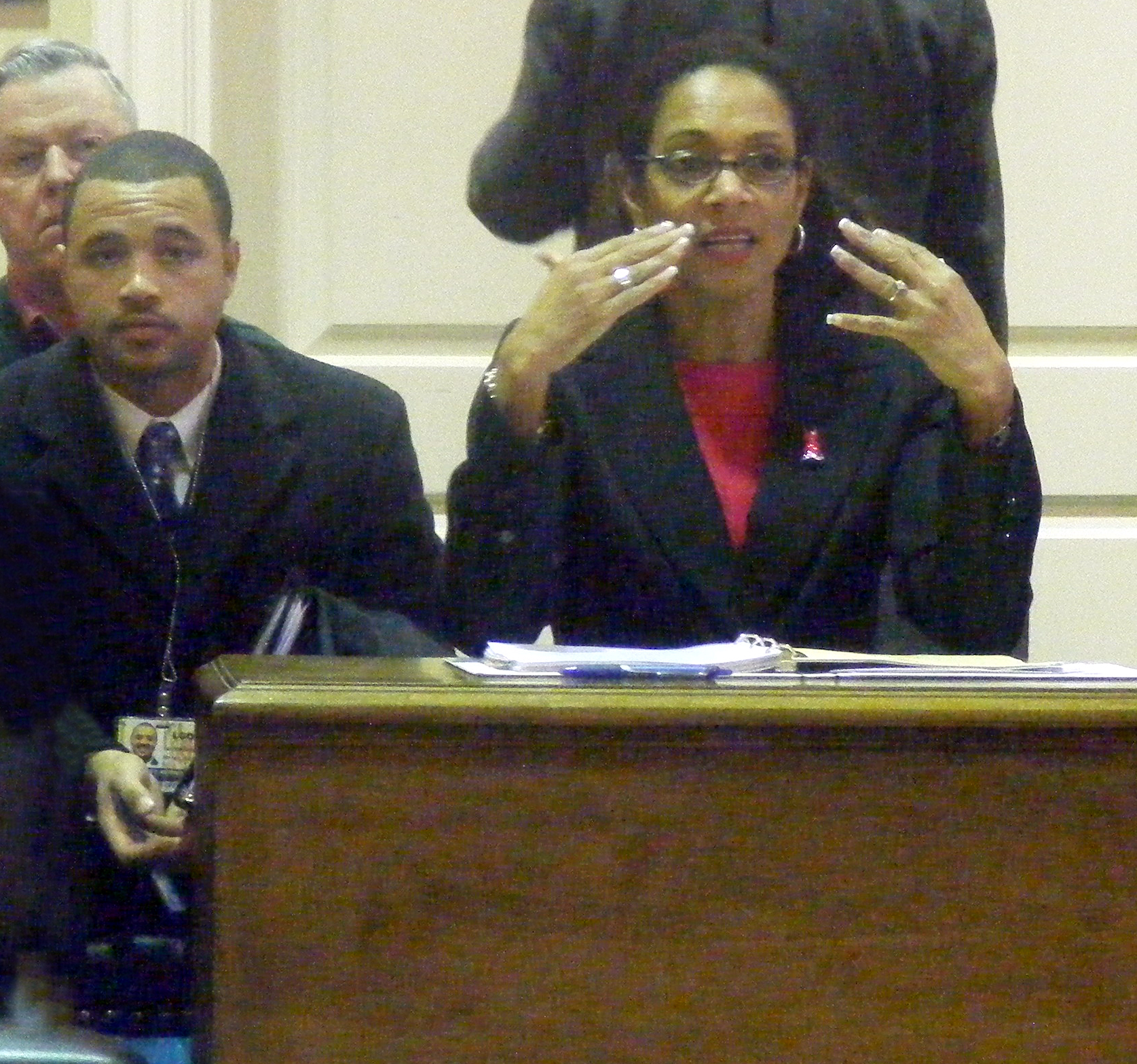
Mayor Sheila Dixon addressing the Delegation on Baltimore City safety related bills.

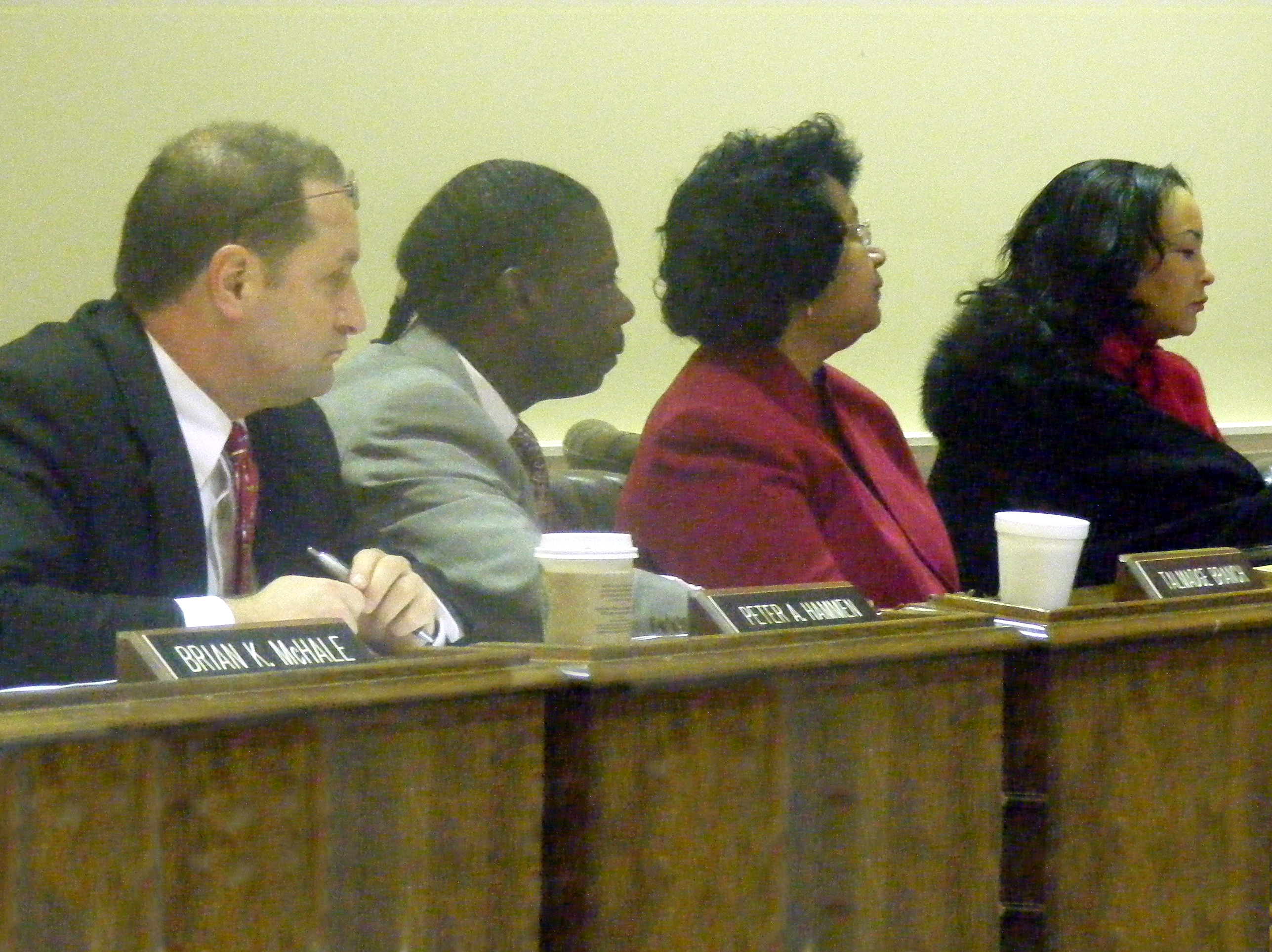
Delegation members (l-r): Hammen, Branch, Glenn and Carter at the delegation briefing by Mayor Dixon

For the 2009 Legislative Session, the Baltimore City Delegation met for a total of 10 meetings, with the attendance of all Delegates between 90–95%. Throughout the 90-day Session, the Baltimore City Delegation heard from various major City agencies, which briefed the Delegation on the agencies’ 2009 Legislative Priorities.

- Dr. Andres Alonso, CEO – Baltimore City Public School System (BCPSS)
- Baltimore City Mayor's Office
- Dept of Planning – Red Line Initiative
- Dept. Of Public Works – One+One Recycling
- Michael Busch, Speaker of the House
- Governor Martin O’Malley
- Frederick Bealefeld III, Police Commissioner of Baltimore City
- Peter Franchot, Comptroller of Maryland
- Paula Carmody, People's Counsel – Office of People's Counsel
- Senator Ben Cardin

Baltimore City administration bills

The Baltimore City Delegation, with the assistance of Delegation Counsel, Sue McNamee, heard the following bills, sponsored by the Baltimore City Administration:

- HB 87 – Crimes – Violation of Restriction Against Possession of Regulated Firearms – Penalties (UNF)
- HB 88 – Criminal Procedure – Restrictions on Pretrial Release – Offenses Involving Firearms – Repeat Offenders (Became Law)
- HB 92- Baltimore City – Authority of Mayor to Remove Police Commissioner (Became Law)
- HB 94 – Foreign Trade Zones – Application and Process (Became Law)
- HB 99 – Commercial Real Property – Action to Abate Drug Nuisance – Prior Notice Requirement (Became Law)
- HB 143- Baltimore City – Newly Constructed Dwelling Property Tax Credit – Modification and Reauthorization (Became Law)
- HB 396 – Baltimore City- Vehicle Laws – Speed Monitoring Systems (Became Law – Statewide Impact)
- SB 348 – Tax Sales – Fees (Became Law)
- SB 901 – Baltimore City Land Bank Authority – Recodification (Became Law)

Baltimore City related bills

The Baltimore City Delegation also heard the following bills which would have either direct or indirect impact on Baltimore City:

- HB 500 – Del. Tarrant, et al. – Baltimore City – Medical Assistance Programs – Eligibility and Enrollment Information Mailings to Students (Became Law)
- HB 1156 – Del. Rosenberg, et al. – Baltimore City Lead Poisoning Recovery Act of 2009 (UNF)
- HB 1008 – Del. Conaway – Education – Baltimore City – Public and Private Schools – Criminal Law and Criminal Procedure Courses (UNF)
- HB 1013 – Del. Conaway – Baltimore City – Rifles and Shotguns – Possession by a Minor Prohibited (UNF)
- HB 1031 – Del. Conaway – Baltimore City Board of School Commissioners – System of Public School Buses Required (UNF)
- HB 1091/ SB 16 – Del. Glenn/ Sen. Conway – Baltimore City and Prince George's County- Organization of Parents and Teachers – Matching Fund (Became Law)
- HB 1374 – Del. Oaks, et al. – Baltimore City School Police Officers – Baltimore City School Police Lodge Five – Employee Organization (Became Law)
- SB 983 – Sen. Conway, et al. – Baltimore City – Alcoholic Beverages – Beer, Wine and Liquor Tasting License (Became Law)

The last Baltimore City Delegation meeting of the 2009 Legislative Session was held on Friday March 27, 2009, in which the Delegation was briefed on the City Administration's initiatives on decreasing weekly trash pickup and increasing weekly recycling pickup throughout the City.

== History ==
=== Chairs of the Baltimore City Delegation (last 70 years) ===
Name	Tenure	District and Party
Melissa Wells	2025-	40, Democratic
Stephanie M. Smith	2020-2024	45, Democratic
Keith E. Haynes (acting)	2019-2020	44, Democratic
Cheryl Glenn	2018-2019	45, Democratic
Curt Anderson	2006–2018	43, Democratic
Salima Siler Marriott	1999–2006	41, Democratic
Frank Boston	1992–1998	41, Democratic
Margaret "Peggy" Murphy	1989–1992	41, Democratic
Larry Young	1988–1989	39, Democratic
American Joe Miedusiewski	1987–1988	39, Democratic
Wendell H. Phillips	1986–1987	41, Democratic
Dennis C. McCoy	1979–1986	44, Democratic
Paul Weisengoff	1974–1979	47, Democratic
Murray Abramson	1962–1970	5, Democratic
Marvin Mandel	1954–1962	5, Democratic

== Current members of the Baltimore City Delegation ==
District	Place of birth	Delegate	Party	Took office	Committee
40	Baltimore	Frank Conaway	Democratic	2006	Judiciary
40	Baltimore City	Marlon Amprey	Democratic	2021	Economic Matters
40	Baltimore City	Melissa Wells	Democratic	2018	Environment and Transportation
41	Baltimore City	Sean Stinnett	Democratic	2025	Judiciary
41	Baltimore City	Malcolm Ruff	Democratic	2023	Appropriations
41	Baltimore City	Sandy Rosenberg	Democratic	1982	Health and Government Operations
43	Baltimore, Maryland	Elizabeth Embry	Democratic	2023	Judiciary
43	Washington, D.C.	Regina Boyce	Democratic	2018	Environment and Transportation
45	Baltimore City	Jackie Addison	Democratic	2023	
45	Baltimore City	Caylin Young	Democratic	2023	Judiciary
45	Baltimore City	Stephanie M. Smith	Democratic	2018	Appropriations
46	Baltimore City	Robbyn Lewis	Democratic	2017	Environment and Transportation
46	Baltimore City	Luke Clippinger	Democratic	2011	Judiciary (Chair)
46	Pretoria, South Africa	Mark Edelson	Democratic	2023	Appropriations

== Delegation subcommittees ==
During the first Baltimore City Delegation meeting of the 2007 Maryland General Assembly Legislative Session, the Delegation was divided into 3 Sub-Committees, to provide closer insight on issues which would directly or indirectly affect Baltimore City:

=== Public Safety ===
- Del. Sandy Rosenberg
- Del. Frank Conaway

=== Alcohol ===
- Del. Luke Clippinger - Chairman

=== Education ===
- Del. Robbyn Givens
- Del. Sandy Rosenberg
- Del. Stephanie Smith

== See also ==
- Current members of the Maryland State Senate
