= Chanel Branch =

American politician

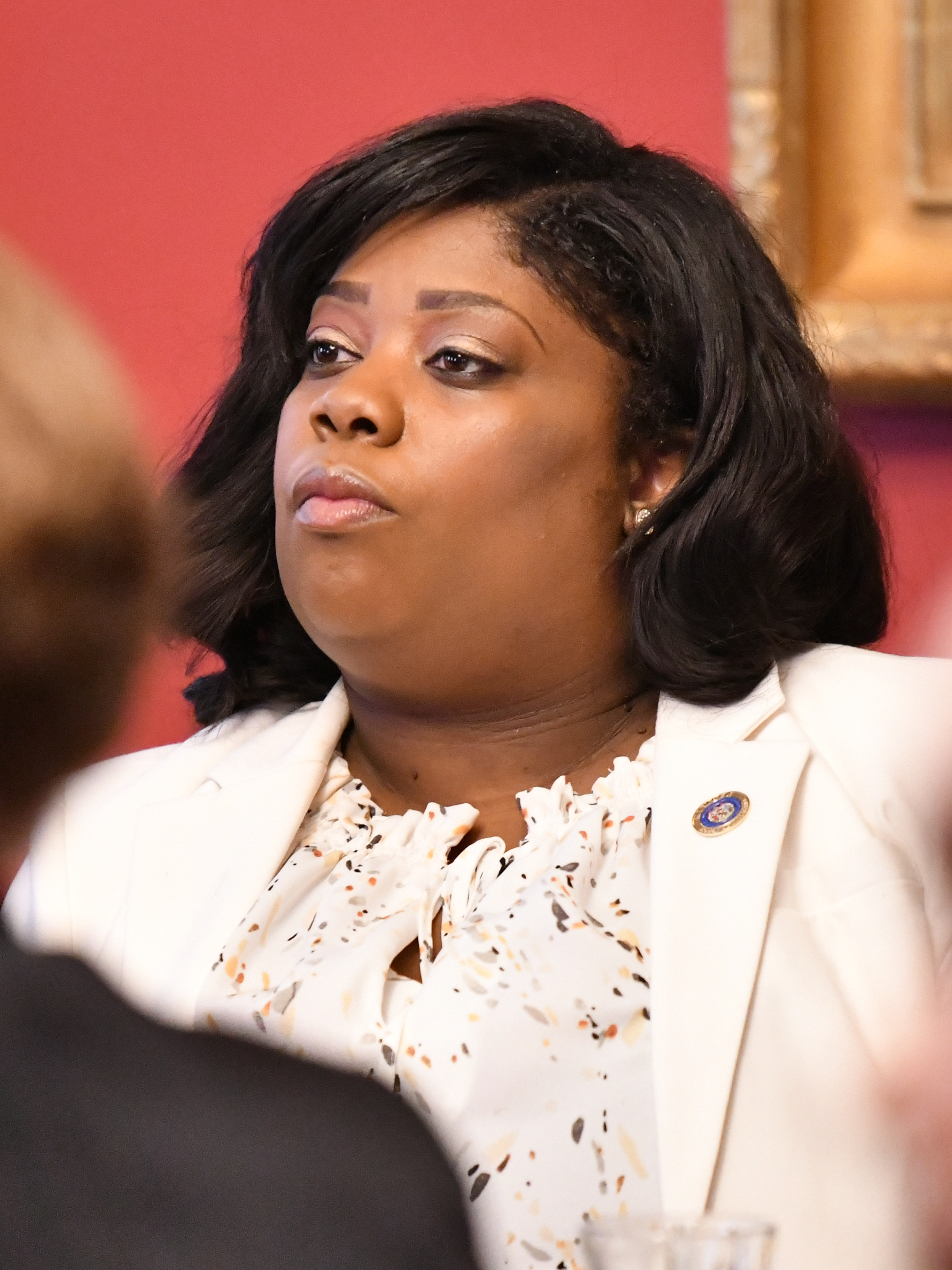
- Branch in 2020

Member-elect of the Maryland House of Delegates from the 45th district
- Assuming office January 7, 2027
- Succeeding: Stephanie M. Smith
- In office January 28, 2020 – January 11, 2023
- Appointed by: Larry Hogan
- Preceded by: Cheryl Glenn
- Succeeded by: Caylin Young

Personal details
- Born: Chanel A. Branch; February 6, 1980 (age 46) Baltimore, Maryland, U.S.
- Party: Democratic
- Children: Tyrone Ray Jr.
- Parent: Talmadge Branch (father)

Chanel Branch (born February 6, 1980) is an American politician who is a member-elect of the Maryland House of Delegates from District 45. A member of the Democratic Party, she represented the district in the Maryland House of Delegates from 2020 to 2023. Branch is the daughter of former state delegate Talmadge Branch.

Born and raised in Baltimore, Branch attended Baltimore City Community College and the TESST College of Technology. She was appointed to the Maryland House of Delegates by Governor Larry Hogan in January 2020 and ran for election to a full four-year term in 2022, but was narrowly defeated in the Democratic primary. She again ran for the seat in 2026, defeating incumbent state delegate Stephanie M. Smith in the Democratic primary.

== Background ==
Branch was born on February 6, 1980, in Baltimore, Maryland, where she graduated from Paul Laurence Dunbar High School. She attended Baltimore City Community College and the TESST College of Technology.

In July 2017, Branch's son was murdered in Baltimore City. She lobbied, alongside her father, Delegate Talmadge Branch, for stricter sentences for handgun violations and for $3.6 million to expand Safe Streets, an anti-violence initiative. Since 2019, she has been a member of Safe Streets and Mothers of Murdered Sons & Daughters.

In the summer of 2019, Branch filed to fill a vacancy in the Baltimore City Council that was left by the appointment of Brandon Scott to serve as the council's president. In October 2019, Branch announced her candidacy for the Baltimore City Council, seeking to challenge councilmember Danielle McCray, who won the nomination over Branch. Branch dropped out of the race for the Baltimore City Council on February 4, 2020.

== Maryland House of Delegates ==
In January 2020, after the resignation of Delegate Cheryl Glenn following federal corruption charges, Branch applied to fill the seat vacated by Glenn in the Maryland House of Delegates. The Baltimore City Democratic Central Committee voted to recommend Branch to the seat, with three members, including herself, voting for Branch and the other four members split among three other candidates. During the committee vote, party officials prevented reporters from entering the meeting room, claiming that media was not allowed at the request of Humanim, the non-profit that owned the Wiessner-American Brewery building where the meeting took place. Reporters were later allowed to attend the second half of the meeting, and Humanim clarified it was not their policy to ban reporters from the open Democratic process. Following this incident, 45th District residents delivered a letter to Baltimore Democratic leaders, alleging that the process of filling a House of Delegates vacancy violated party bylaws and the Maryland Open Meetings Act. The letter called for Governor Hogan and the Baltimore City Democratic State Central Committee to reject the nomination and do the vote over. Nevertheless, Governor Hogan appointed Branch to the Maryland House of Delegates on January 28, 2020.

Branch was sworn in as a member of the Maryland House of Delegates on January 28, 2020. She was assigned to the House Ways and Means committee and is member of the Legislative Black Caucus of Maryland and the Women Legislators of Maryland.

Branch filed to run for a full term in the 2022 elections. She lost the Democratic primary on July 19, 2022, finishing fourth behind Caylin Young, who had bested her by 116 votes. Branch again ran for the Maryland House of Delegates in 2026, this time placing third in the Democratic primary and edging out incumbent Stephanie M. Smith by 306 votes. Branch was assigned to the Environment and Transportation Committee.

== Political positions ==
During the 2022 legislative session, Branch introduced a bill to establish specialized gun courts in Baltimore to expedite some firearm cases and, when appropriate, offer resources and support services instead of incarceration.

== Electoral history ==
Democratic primary results
Party	Candidate	Votes	%
Democratic	Jackie Addison	9,577	25.3
Democratic	Stephanie M. Smith (incumbent)	8,638	22.9
Democratic	Caylin Young	8,567	22.7
Democratic	Chanel Branch (incumbent)	8,451	22.4
Democratic	George Johnson	2,567	6.8
