= Stephanie M. Smith =

American politician (born 1981)

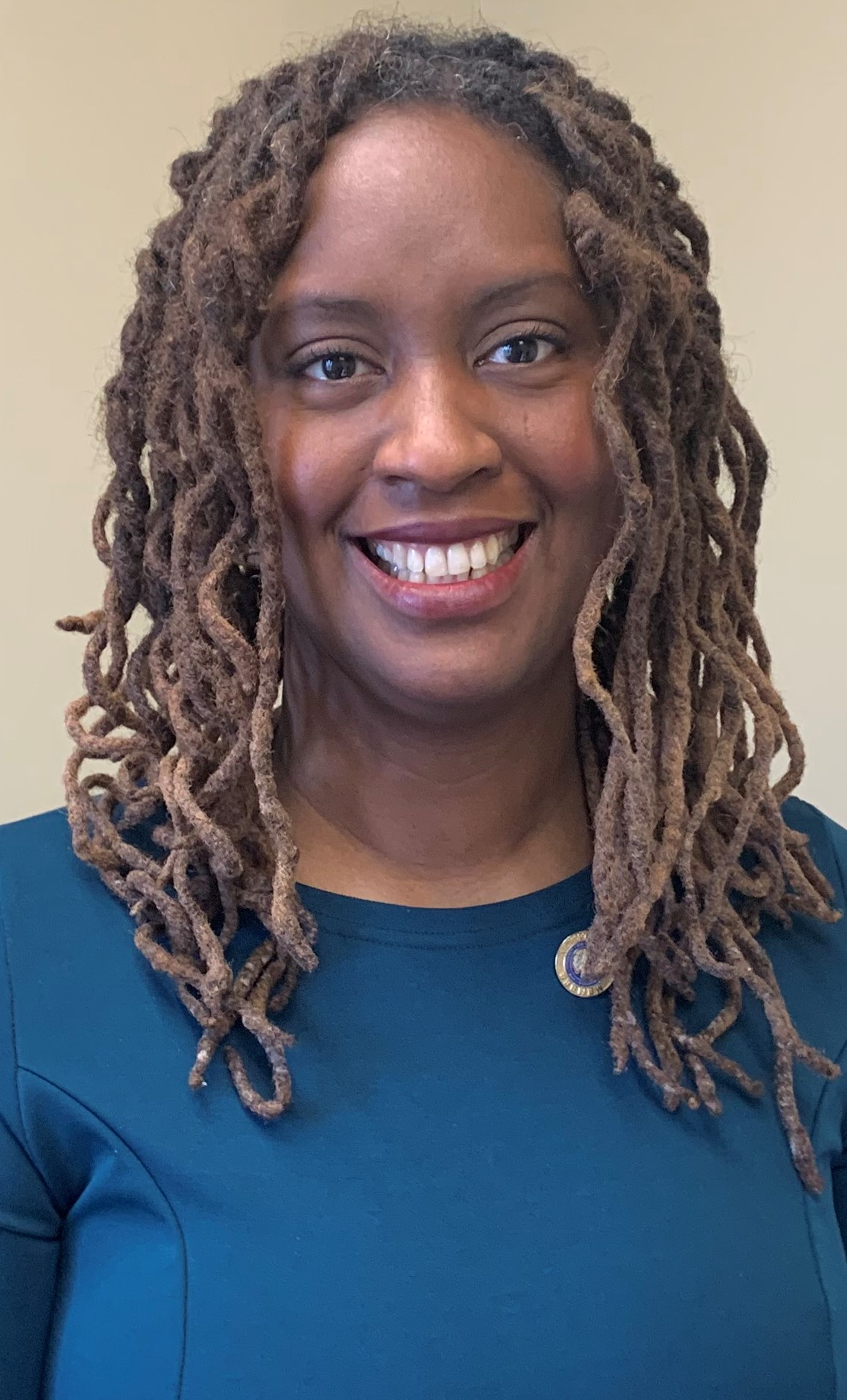
- Smith in 2020

Member of the Maryland House of Delegates from the 45th district
- Incumbent
- Assumed office January 9, 2019 Serving with Jackie Addison and Caylin Young
- Preceded by: Cory McCray

Personal details
- Born: May 20, 1981 (age 45) Virginia Beach, Virginia
- Party: Democratic
- Spouse: Calvin L. Smith Jr.
- Children: 2
- Education: Hampton University (BA); University of Delaware (MA); Howard University School of Law (JD)
- Occupation: Attorney, Urban Planner

Stephanie M. Smith (born May 20, 1981) is an American politician who currently serves in the Maryland House of Delegates. Smith represents the 45th Legislative District of the state of Maryland which is located in east Baltimore City.

== Background ==
Smith was born in Virginia Beach, Virginia on May 20, 1981. She attended Hampton University, where she earned a Bachelor of Arts degree in political science in 2003; the University of Delaware, where she earned a Master of Arts degree in urban affairs and public policy in 2006; and the Howard University School of Law, where she earned a Juris Doctor degree in 2009. She was admitted to the Maryland Bar in 2012. After graduating, she served as the assistant director for Equity, Engagement, and Communications for the Baltimore City Department of Planning and worked with various civic organizations in the city. Smith also served as a general counsel for Earthjustice. Smith is a member of AmeriCorps and the 2017 Emerge Maryland graduating class.

== In the legislature ==
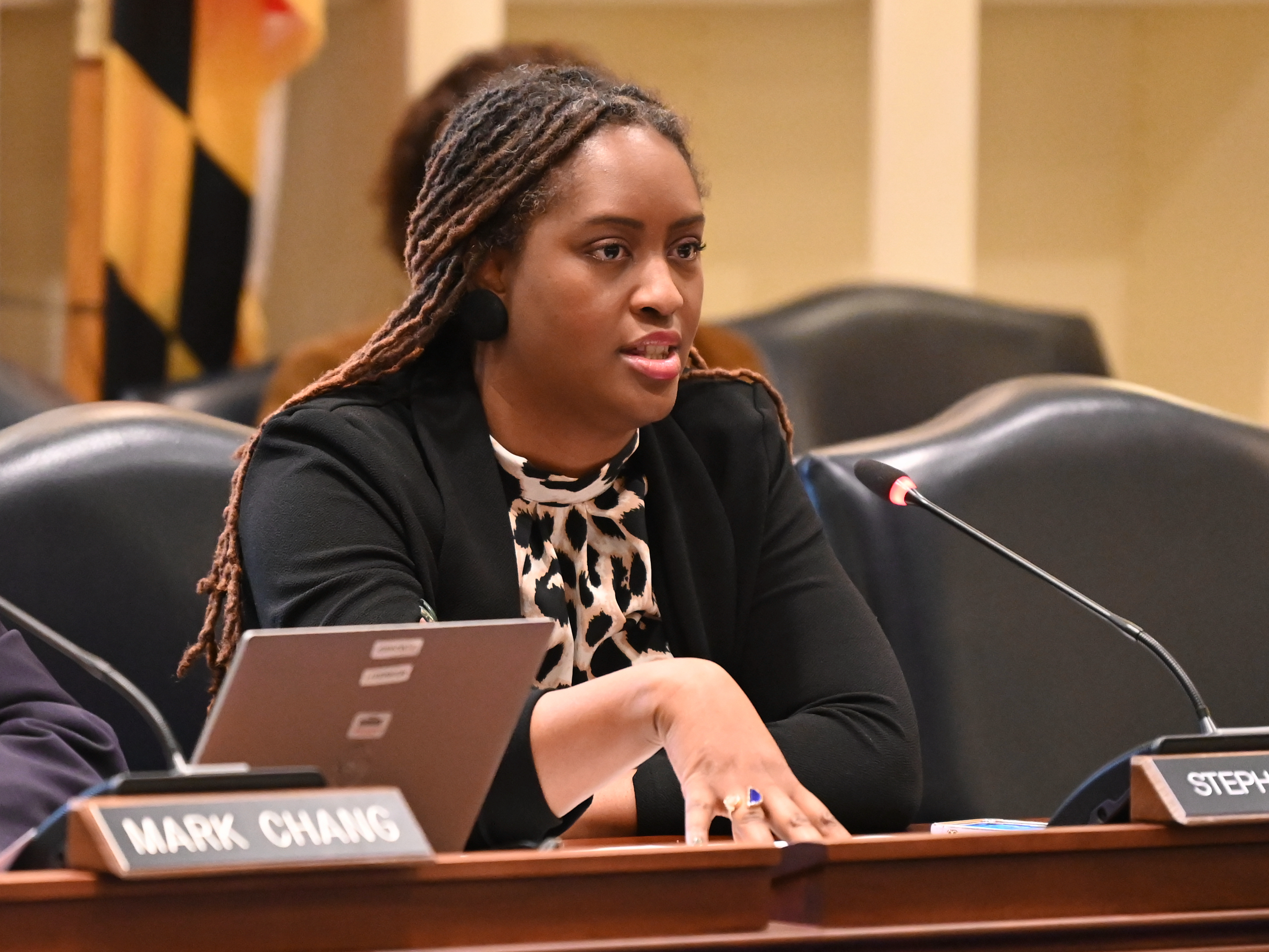
Smith in the House Appropriations Committee, 2024

Smith was sworn in as a member of the Maryland House of Delegates on January 9, 2019. During her tenure, Smith was a member of the Ways and Means Committee from 2019 to 2021, afterwards serving on the Appropriations Committee until 2027. In January 2020, she was elected to lead the Baltimore City Delegation, succeeding former chairwoman Cheryl Glenn. In March 2022, Legislative Black Caucus chairman Darryl Barnes appointed Smith to serve as the caucus parliamentarian. She was also a member of the Maryland Legislative Transit Caucus, the Maryland Legislative Latino Caucus, and the Women Legislators of Maryland, serving as the president of the women's caucus during the 2026 legislative session.

Smith was a delegate to the 2024 Democratic National Convention, pledged to Kamala Harris.

In June 2026, Smith was defeated in the Democratic primary by former state delegate Chanel Branch, who won alongside incumbents Jackie Addison and Caylin Young and edged out Smith by 306 votes. Following the primary election, Smith accused state senator Cory McCray of mounting "an organized effort to push me out"; on Election Day that year, McCray posted a video encouraging voters to come out to support Branch, Young, and Addison. In a statement to Maryland Matters, McCray responded that he respected Smith's service in the General Assembly and wishes her and her family "nothing but the best in the next chapter of her journey".

== Political positions ==
=== Education ===
Smith supports, and voted in favor of passing in 2020, the Blueprint for Maryland's Future. She also supports a vaccine mandate for teachers.

=== Social issues ===
During the 2020 legislative session, Smith introduced legislation to ban discrimination based on hair texture. The bill passed and became law on May 8, 2020.

During the 2021 legislative session, Smith introduced legislation to require the state to use federal pandemic relief funding to pay electronic monitoring and home detention fees for select defendants. The bill passed and became law on May 30, 2021.

=== Taxes ===
During the 2020 legislative session, Smith introduced legislation to restructure the state's income tax brackets, restoring a higher 7 percent tax bracket for Marylanders with an annual income over $1 million.

=== Transportation ===
Smith opposed a proposal to build a Maglev from Baltimore to Washington, D.C.

== Electoral history ==
Maryland House of Delegates District 45 Democratic Primary Election, 2018
Party	Candidate	Votes	%
Democratic	Talmadge Branch	6,394	19.6
Democratic	Cheryl Glenn	5,792	17.8
Democratic	Stephanie Smith	4,486	13.7
Democratic	Caylin Young	3,955	12.1
Democratic	Sharon McCollough	2,886	8.8
Democratic	Marques Dent	2,705	8.3
Democratic	Rita Church	2,561	7.8
Democratic	Linzy Jackson	1,863	5.7
Democratic	John D. Amankwah	697	2.1
Democratic	George Johnson	686	2.1
Democratic	Andy Pierre	602	1.8

Maryland House of Delegates District 45 Election, 2018
Party	Candidate	Votes	%
Democratic	Cheryl Glenn	22,818	27.6
Democratic	Stephanie Smith	22,524	27.3
Democratic	Talmadge Branch	21,654	26.2
Green	Glenn L. Ross	4,026	4.9
Green	Steven "Andy" Ellis	3,735	4.5
Republican	Ronald M. Owens-Bey	2,825	3.4
Republican	Jewel Rucker	2,485	3.0
Republican	Andy Zipay	2,375	2.9
Write-In		136	0.2
