= Cory McCray =

American politician (born 1982)

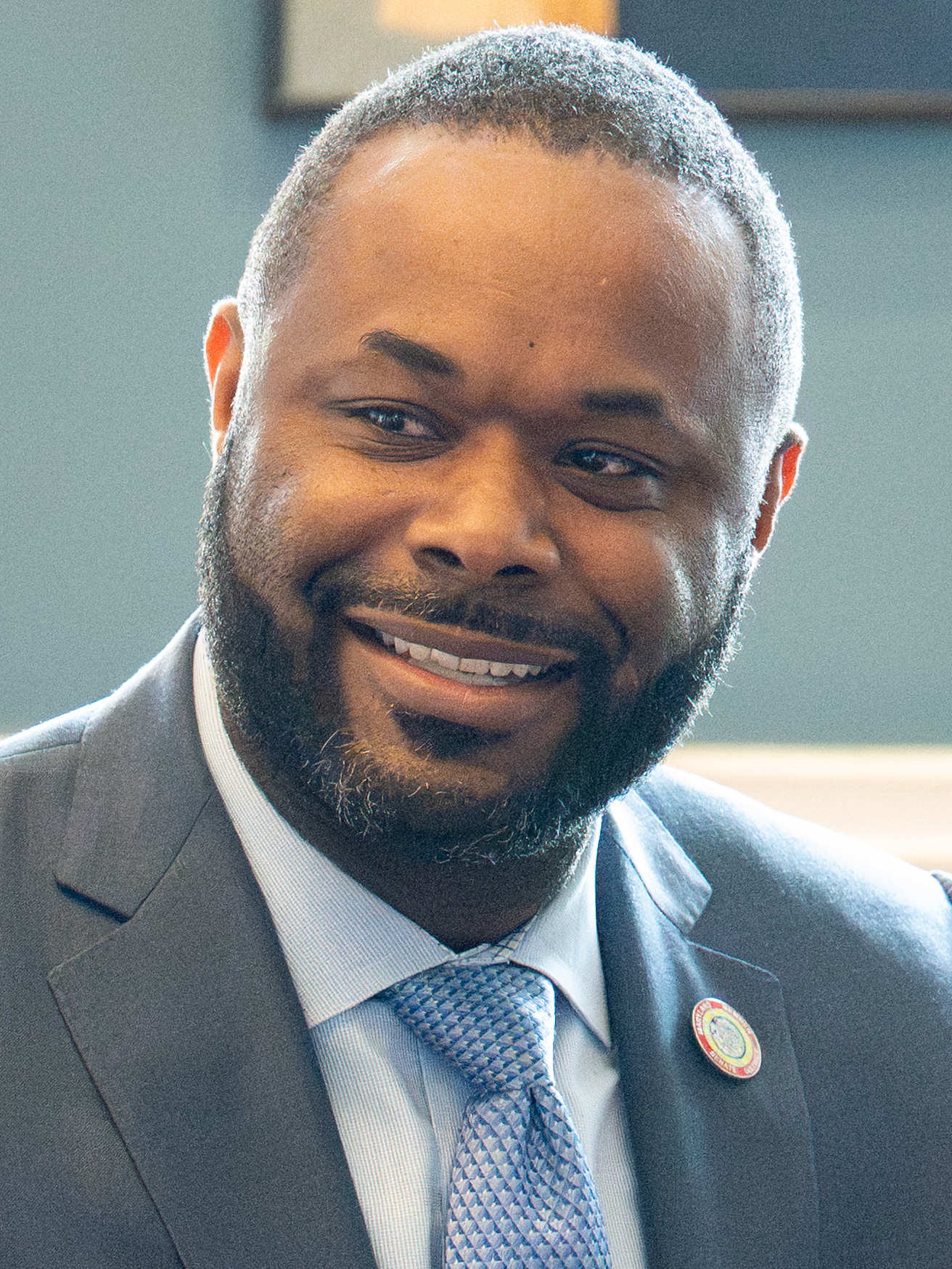
- McCray in 2026

Member of the Maryland Senate from the 45th district
- Incumbent
- Assumed office January 9, 2019
- Preceded by: Nathaniel J. McFadden

Acting Chair of the Maryland Democratic Party
- In office November 11, 2019 – December 7, 2019
- Preceded by: Maya Rockeymoore Cummings
- Succeeded by: Yvette Lewis

Member of the Maryland House of Delegates from the 45th district
- In office January 14, 2015 – January 9, 2019 Serving with Talmadge Branch and Cheryl Glenn
- Preceded by: Nina R. Harper
- Succeeded by: Stephanie M. Smith

Personal details
- Born: October 31, 1982 (age 43) Baltimore, Maryland, U.S.
- Party: Democratic
- Spouse: Demetria
- Children: 4
- Relatives: Danielle McCray
- Education: Baltimore City Community College (AS); National Labor College (BA)

Cory V. McCray (born October 31, 1982) is an American politician and electrician who serves as a member of the Maryland Senate for Maryland's 45th district, located in northeast Baltimore City. Previously, McCray served as a member of the Maryland House of Delegates and acting Chair of the Maryland Democratic Party.

== Early life and career ==
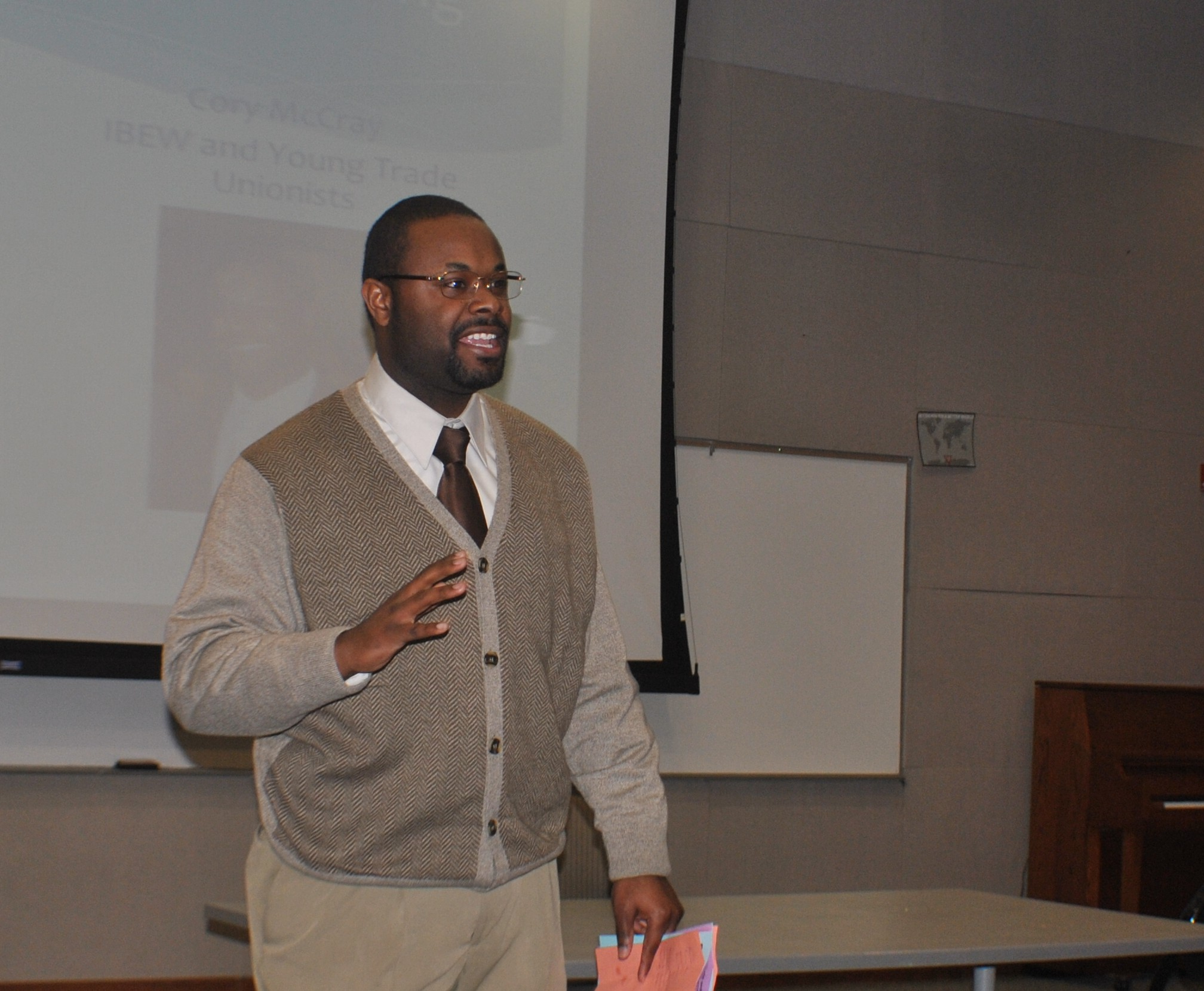
McCray speaking at UMBC, 2012

McCray was born in Baltimore, Maryland and attended Fairmount-Harford High School. At age 13, McCray was incarcerated at the Cheltenham Youth Detention Center for 30 days for possessing a stolen firearm. Shortly after McCray's 18th birthday, he signed up for an apprenticeship program with the International Brotherhood of Electrical Workers, where he later served as an organizer. The program gave him enough money to start investing in real estate, purchasing his first house at 20. By age 25, he owned seven houses. In 2011, McCray received an Associate degree in business management from the Baltimore City Community College and a Bachelor of Arts degree from the National Labor College in 2013. From 2011 to 2013, he served on the Baltimore City Board of Elections.

In 2012, McCray and other community leaders formed the B.E.S.T. Democratic Club, which encouraged young people in east Baltimore to get involved in politics. By 2014, the group had more than 500 members. In May 2013, McCray announced his candidacy for the Maryland House of Delegates, seeking to succeed delegate Nina R. Harper, who was appointed to the House following the death of Hattie N. Harrison. He prevailed in the Democratic primary, receiving 19.5 percent of the vote and coming third in a field of eight candidates. He received 27.6 percent of the vote in the general election.

McCray is considered a political ally of Brandon Scott. During his 2014 House run, he worked closely with Scott when he was a city councilmember to provide constituent services to residents he encountered while canvassing. McCray was also a member of his mayoral transition team in 2020.

== In the legislature ==
After being sworn in on January 14, 2015, McCray was appointed to the House Environment and Transportation Committee. He is also a member of the Legislative Black Caucus of Maryland and the Baltimore City Delegation.

In March 2017, Nicole Hanson, executive director of Out for Justice, filed an ethics complaint against McCray, saying that she felt "physically and psychologically" threatened by McCray after he lost his temper during a conversation about the roots of poverty, causing him to throw a chair against a wall and begin using expletives. McCray denied throwing a chair, but acknowledged that his language and volume were unacceptable. He did not apologize to Hanson until he ran into her at a community event several weeks later. In April, the General Assembly's ethics committee found that McCray "breached the standards of conduct expected of a member."

In July 2017, McCray publicly expressed interest in challenging Senate President Pro Tempore Nathaniel J. McFadden in the 2018 primary election, saying that he was "about 90 percent sure he will challenge his senator." He announced his candidacy for the Maryland Senate in September. McCray defeated McFadden in the Democratic primary election, receiving 58.5 percent of the vote to McFadden's 41.5 percent. He faced no Republican challengers in the general election.

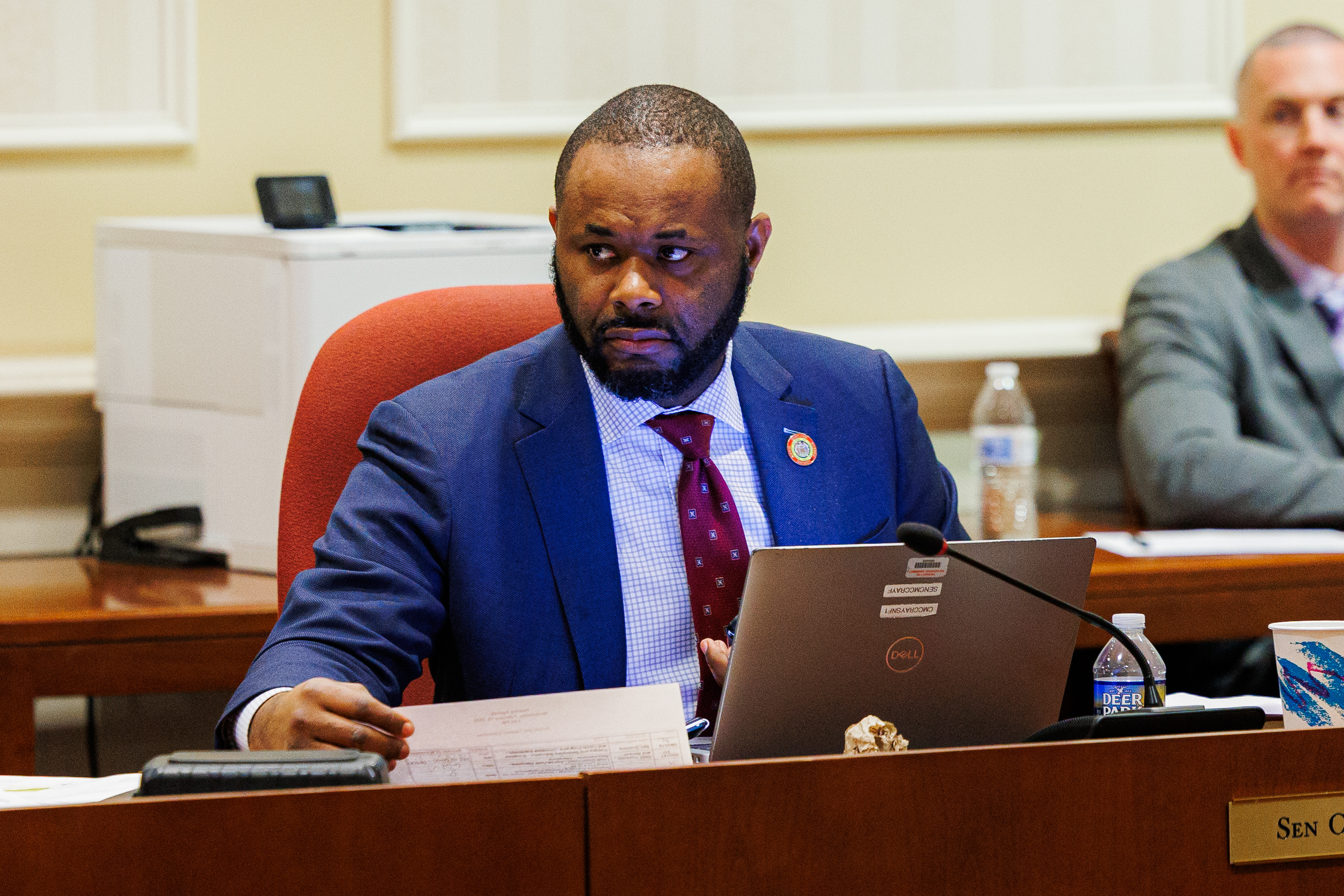
McCray in the Budget and Taxation Committee, 2024

McCray was sworn into the Maryland Senate on January 9, 2019. He was appointed to the Budget and Taxation Committee, the Joint Audit and Evaluation Committee, the Special Committee on Pensions, the Joint Audit Committee, and the Spending Affordability Committee, and is a member of the Maryland Legislative Transit Caucus, the Legislative Black Caucus of Maryland. He was also an associate member of the Maryland Legislative Latino Caucus from 2019 to 2020. In November 2020, He was elected chair of the Baltimore City Senate Delegation. In October 2026, Senate President Bill Ferguson named McCray as the vice chair of the Budget and Taxation Committee.

In October 2019, following the death of Representative Elijah Cummings, McCray said that he would give "serious consideration" to running in the 2020 special election in Maryland's 7th congressional district to fill the rest of his term. He later said that he would not run for the seat.

In June 2025, The Baltimore Banner reported on McCray's involvement with a proposal by Ronald Lipscomb to build a new apartment building near the Johns Hopkins Hospital in east Baltimore. McCray, a board member of East Baltimore Development Inc. (EBDI), reportedly pressured fellow board members to sell a narrow plot of land near Johns Hopkins Hospital to Ronald Lipscomb—a developer who was involved in multiple corruption probes—for $1.35 million, which was 25% of the land's appraised value. In 2023, McCray amended a state bond bill to award a $1.44 million grant to an unrelated nonprofit that acted as a pass-through for Lipscomb's development, after which McCray personally presented the project to community members as affordable housing, even though Lipscomb planned to sell units at the apartment at the market rate. In an interview with The Baltimore Banner, McCray said that he had zero concerns with giving state money to Lipscomb, saying that he "has to offer, at some level, some type of incentives for developers to come to my neighborhood". He also declined to describe his relationship with Lipscomb, saying that he was just a developer who works inside his district, and denied pressuring EBDI to accept Lipscomb's offer. As of June 2025, Lipscomb's proposed apartments project has not broken ground.

In September 2025, McCray's book, The Apprenticeship that Saved My Life: Guidebook to Navigating the Earn-While-You-Learn Opportunity of a Lifetime, was published. The book follows McCray's early life and career and is written as a "guidebook" for students, parents, teachers, guidance counselors, and mentors.

== Acting Chair of the Maryland Democratic Party ==
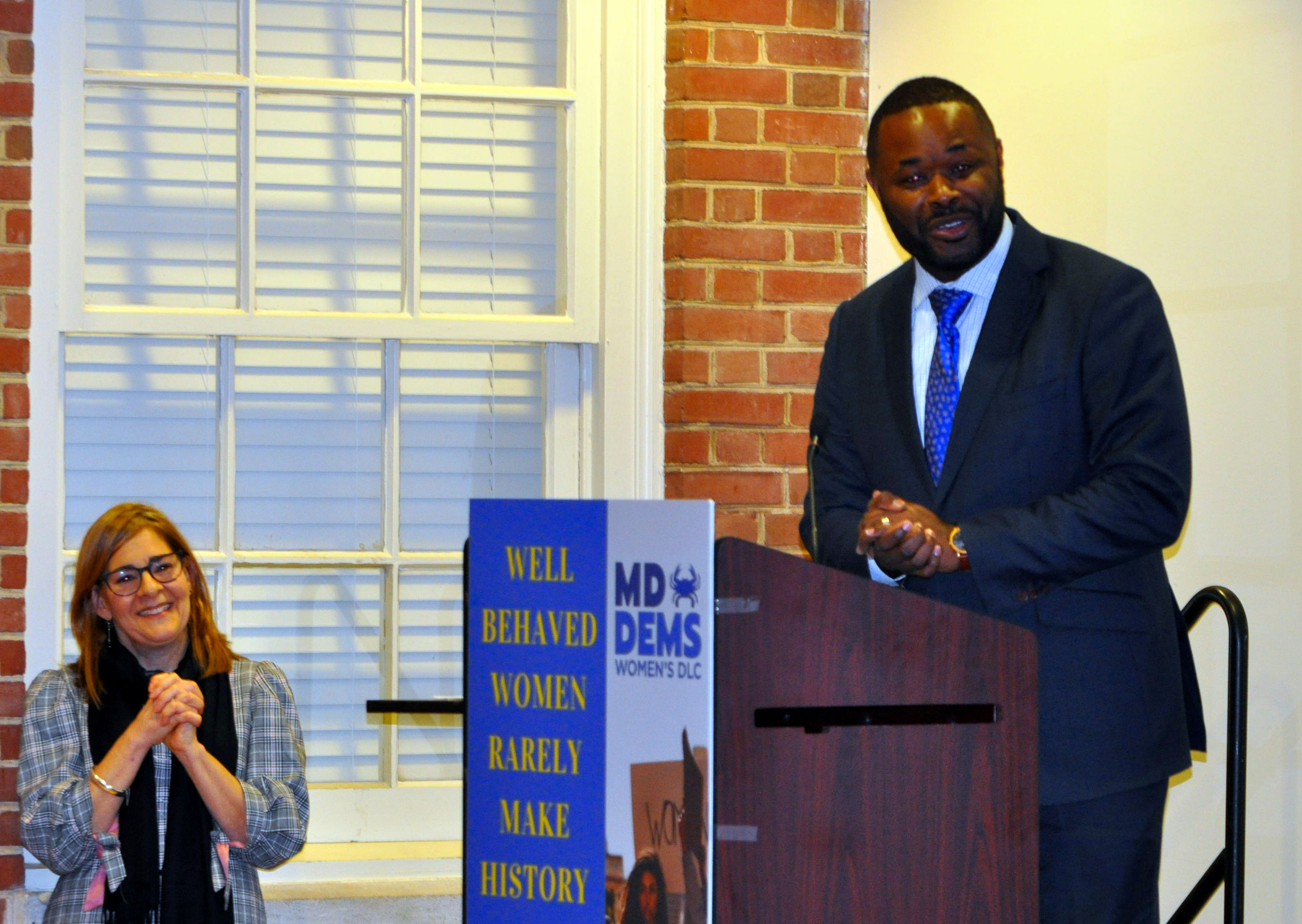
McCray speaking at a Women's Diversity Leadership Council event, 2019

McCray was sworn in as the acting chair of the Maryland Democratic Party on November 11, 2019, following the resignation of Maya Rockeymoore Cummings, who announced her candidacy for the special election in Maryland's 7th congressional district. He opted out of running in the election for the party's new chair. During his short tenure, he alleged that the organization was overspending without strong financial controls under Cummings' leadership. To right the organization's fiscal health, he cancelled contracts with consults and recommended other fiscal controls to the Maryland State Central Committee. On December 7, 2019, the Maryland Democratic Party elected Yvette Lewis to serve as party chairwoman again through December 2022.

== Political positions ==
=== COVID-19 pandemic ===
In March 2021, McCray joined five other senators in delivering a letter to Governor Larry Hogan that expressed "grave concerns" over equity of the state's vaccination program rollout.

=== Crime ===
McCray was one of four senators to vote against legislation introduced in the 2020 legislative session that would provide tougher penalties for gun offenders.

McCray introduced legislation in the 2022 legislative session that would require the Maryland Division of Pretrial Detention and Services to notify city police whenever someone is released on bail.

=== Education ===
McCray introduced legislation during the 2019 legislative session that would expand food stamp benefits through the summer months to students who rely on free meals from their schools. The bill passed and became law without Governor Hogan's signature.

=== Elections ===
McCray introduced legislation in the 2015 legislative session that would restore voting rights for ex-offenders. The bill passed, but was vetoed by Governor Hogan; the Maryland General Assembly voted to override the veto on February 9, 2016.

McCray introduced legislation in the 2019 legislative session that would require the Baltimore police to redraw district boundaries after each census. The bill passed and went into effect on October 1, 2019.

In September 2020, McCray sent a letter to Baltimore City elections director Armstead Jones to ask for more dropoff ballot boxes to be placed in his district, saying that his district had fewer boxes compared to others and calling the placement of boxes within Baltimore "unconscionable".

=== Environment ===
In September 2019, McCray voted against a climate debate resolution at the Democratic National Committee, arguing that his constituents needed him to advocate for greater movement on issues like justice reform, police brutality, and economic opportunity.

McCray introduced legislation in the 2021 legislative session that would reform the Maryland Environmental Service to restrict future payouts, restructure the board and add new requirements, such as ethics training.

=== Minimum wage ===
McCray introduced legislation in the 2019 legislative session that would raise the minimum wage to $15 an hour by 2023. The bill passed with a full-on effective date of 2025, but was vetoed by Governor Larry Hogan on March 27, 2019. The Maryland General Assembly voted to override Hogan's veto on the bill the next day.

=== Policing ===
McCray voted in favor of legislation introduced in the 2019 legislative session that would create an armed police force at the private Johns Hopkins University. He also introduced legislation that would require Baltimore police leaders to live in the city.

McCray introduced legislation in the 2019 legislative session that would make the Baltimore Police Department a city agency instead of a state agency. The bill did not receive a vote over reservations from other city senators. He introduced legislation in the 2021 legislative session that would create a commission to study local control of the city police and allow voters to determine if the city government should regain control of the police department via a charter amendment during the 2022 or 2024 general election. The bill passed and became law.

=== Taxes ===
McCray introduced legislation in the 2020 legislative session that would increase the tax on cigarettes and other tobacco products.

=== Transportation ===
In 2021, McCray joined local officials in advocating for more funding to meet the Maryland Transit Administration's maintenance and other needs. He introduced legislation in the 2021 legislative session that would increase funding to the Maryland Transit Administration to make the state's bus system, MARC train, Metro and Light Rail more safe and reliable. The bill passed the Maryland General Assembly but was vetoed by Governor Hogan on May 28, 2021. The legislature voted to override Hogan's veto during the 2021 special legislative session.

McCray introduced legislation during the 2022 legislative session that would waive late fees and give Maryland residents the ability to set up payment plans for delayed E-ZPass charges.

== Electoral history ==
Maryland House of Delegates District 45 Democratic Primary Election, 2014
Party	Candidate	Votes	%
Democratic	Cheryl Glenn	6,446	22.3%
Democratic	Talmadge Branch	6,120	21.2%
Democratic	Cory V. McCray	5,624	19.5%
Democratic	Robert Stokes Sr.	4,867	16.9%
Democratic	Kevin W. Parson	1,842	6.4%
Democratic	Marques Dent	1,793	6.2%
Democratic	Harry Spikes	1,414	4.9%
Democratic	Aaron Keith Wilkes	738	2.6%

Maryland House of Delegates District 45 General Election, 2014
Party	Candidate	Votes	%
Democratic	Cheryl Glenn	18,197	29.3%
Democratic	Talmadge Branch	18,058	29.1%
Democratic	Cory V. McCray	17,123	27.6%
Republican	Rick Saffery	3,078	5.0%
Republican	Larry O. Wardlow Jr.	2,805	4.5%
Libertarian	Ronald M. Owens-Bey	2,734	4.4%
Other Write-Ins	Other Write-Ins	117	0.2%

Maryland Senate District 45 Democratic Primary Election, 2018
Party	Candidate	Votes	%
Democratic	Cory V. McCray	7,735	58.4%
Democratic	Nathaniel J. McFadden	5,503	41.6%

Maryland Senate District 45 General Election, 2018
Party	Candidate	Votes	%
Democratic	Cory V. McCray	29,608	98.8%
Other Write-Ins	Other Write-Ins	373	1.2%

Party political offices
Preceded by Maya Rockeymoore Cummings	Chair of the Maryland Democratic Party; Acting; 2019	Succeeded by Yvette Lewis
