= Maryland Legislative District 45 =

American legislative district

Maryland's legislative district 45
- Represents part of the City of Baltimore
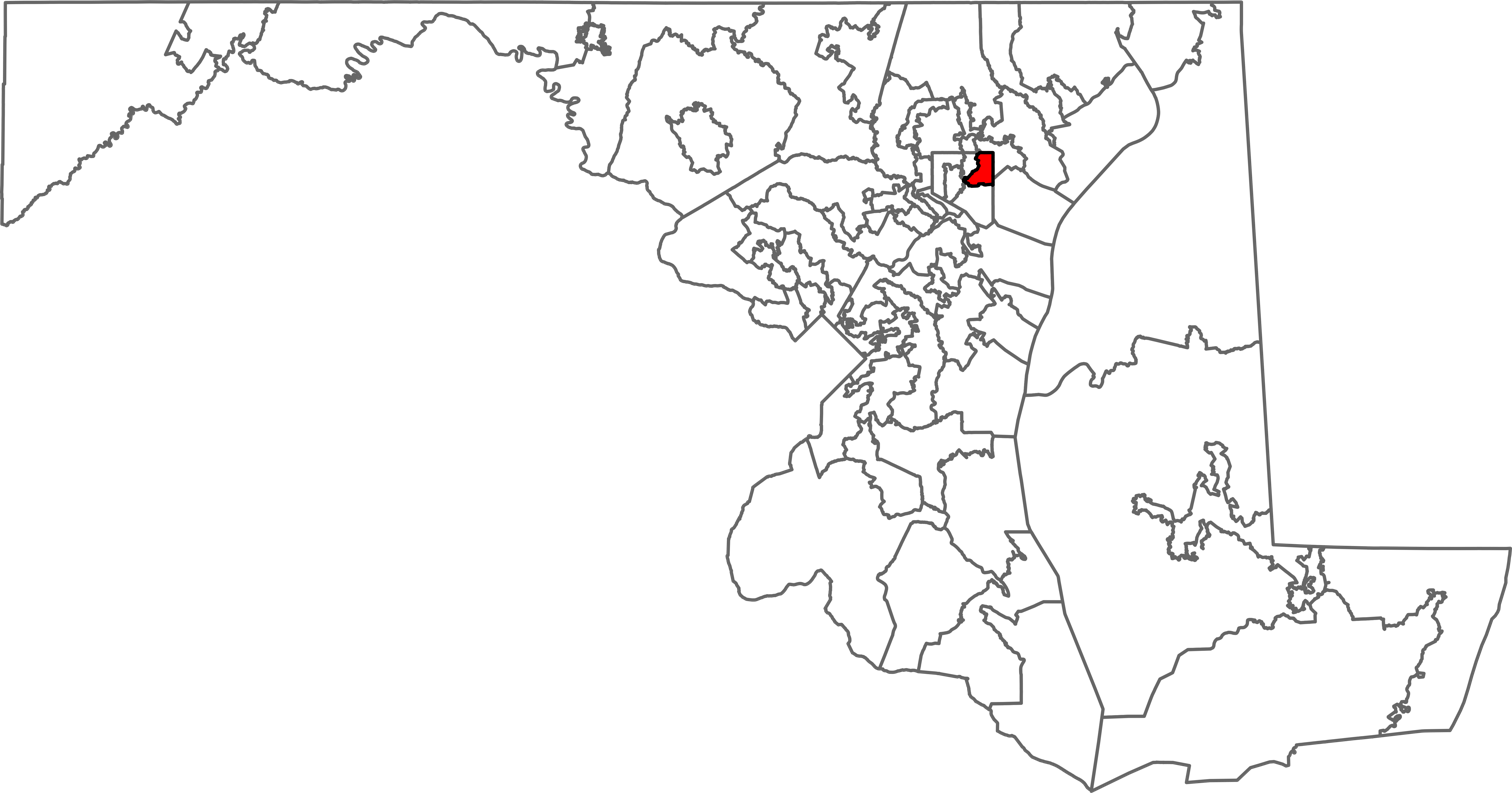
- Senator: Cory V. McCray (D)
- Delegate(s): Jackie Addison (D); Caylin Young (D); Stephanie M. Smith (D)
- Registration: 80.5% Democratic; 6.4% Republican; 11.7% unaffiliated
- Demographics: 17.2% White; 72.4% Black/African American; 0.4% Native American; 1.7% Asian; 0.0% Hawaiian/Pacific Islander; 3.5% Other race; 4.8% Two or more races; 5.8% Hispanic
- Population (2020): 107,403
- Voting-age population: 83,995
- Registered voters: 75,097

Maryland Legislative District 45 is one of 47 legislative districts in the state of Maryland and is one of the 5 located entirely within Baltimore City. The district is represented by three delegates in the Maryland House of Delegates.

== Demographic characteristics ==
As of the 2020 United States census, the district had a population of 107,403, of whom 83,995 (78.2%) were of voting age. The racial makeup of the district was 18,445 (17.2%) White, 77,798 (72.4%) African American, 435 (0.4%) Native American, 1,808 (1.7%) Asian, 24 (0.0%) Pacific Islander, 3,749 (3.5%) from some other race, and 5,135 (4.8%) from two or more races. Hispanic or Latino of any race were 6,206 (5.8%) of the population.

The district had 75,097 registered voters as of October 17, 2020, of whom 8,776 (11.7%) were registered as unaffiliated, 4,773 (6.4%) were registered as Republicans, 60,488 (80.5%) were registered as Democrats, and 669 (0.9%) were registered to other parties.

== Educational institutions ==
=== High schools ===
The 45th district is home to Baltimore's storied Dunbar High School. Dunbar High opened 1918 as the Paul Laurence Dunbar Elementary School, No. 101, as part of the separate "colored schools" system then in place in the Baltimore City Public Schools system which was abolished by 1954. It was named in memory of Paul Laurence Dunbar, a famous African-American poet, who had died ten years earlier. The district is also home to the Heritage High School and the REACH! Partnership School.

=== Universities ===
After the 2010 census and the subsequent re-districting, the University of Baltimore and University of Baltimore School of Law are now part of the 45th district. The University of Baltimore School of Law is housed in the new John and Frances Angelos Law Center, at the corner of Mount Royal Ave. and N. Charles St. on the University of Baltimore's main campus in the Mt. Vernon cultural district.

== Political representation ==
The district is represented for the 2023–2027 legislative term in the State Senate by Cory V. McCray (D) and in the House of Delegates by Jackie Addison (D), Caylin Young (D) and Stephanie M. Smith (D).

== Election results ==
2006 Race for Maryland House of Delegates – 45th District Voters to choose three:
Name	Votes	Percent	Outcome
Cheryl Glenn, Democratic	16,911	32.6%	Won
Hattie N. Harrison, Democratic	16,804	31.0%	Won
Talmadge Branch, Democratic	16,014	30.9%	Won
Ronald M. Owens-Bey, Populist	2,727	5.3%	Lost
Other write-ins	111	.2%	Lost

2010 Race Maryland House of Delegates – 45th District Voters to choose three:
Name	Votes	Percent	Outcome
Talmadge Branch, Democratic (Incumbent)	18,676	30%	Won
Cheryl Glenn, Democratic (Incumbent)	18,232	29.3%	Won
Hattie N. Harrison, Democratic(Incumbent)	17,564	28.2%	Won
Rick Saffery, Republican	2,799	4.5%	Lost
Larry Wardlow, Republican	2,622	4.2%	Lost
Ronald Owens-Bey, Libertarian	2,309	3.7%	Lost
