= Jackie Addison =

American politician (born 1962)

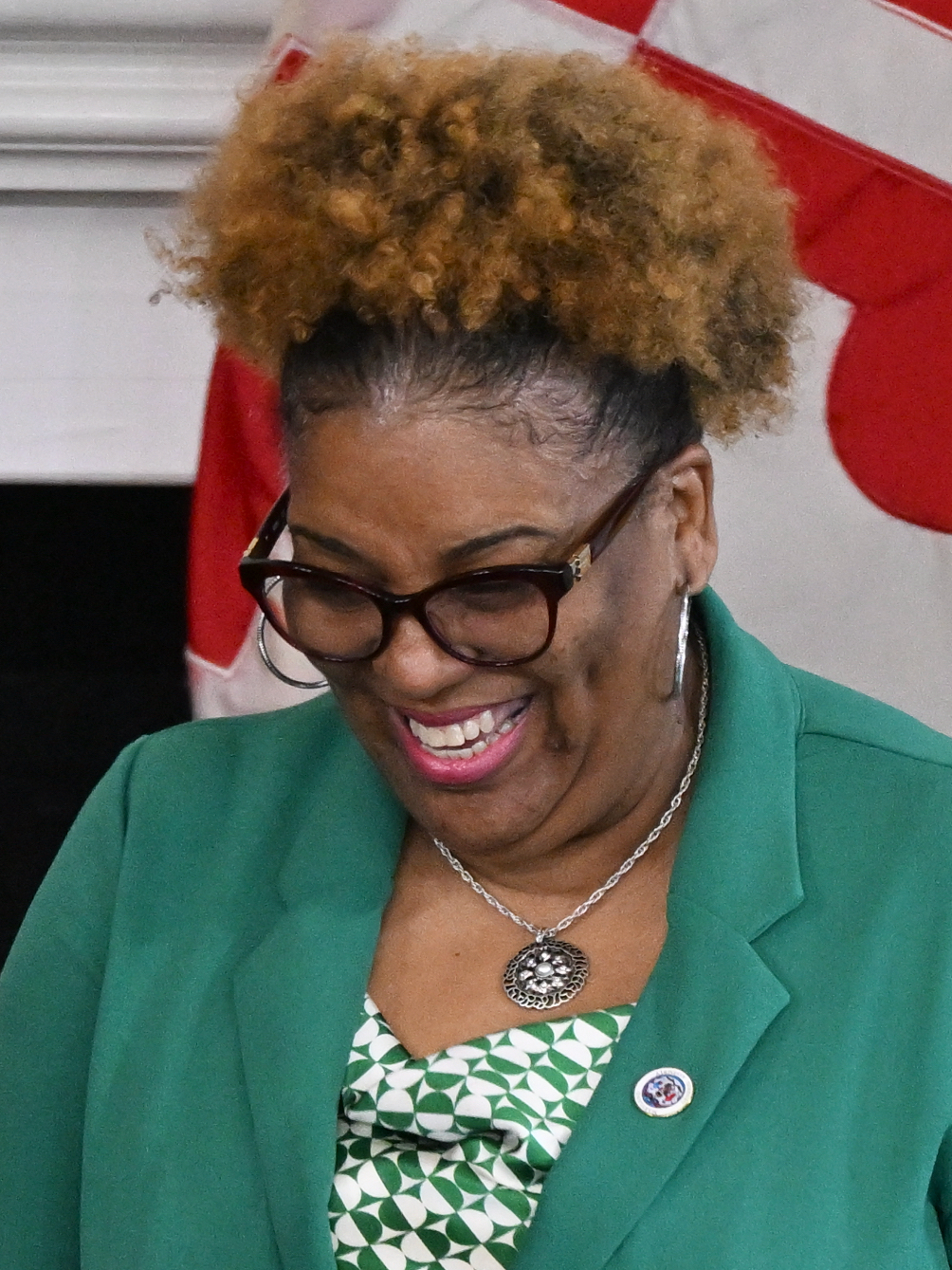
- Addison in 2023

Member of the Maryland House of Delegates from the 45th district
- Incumbent
- Assumed office January 11, 2023 Serving with Stephanie M. Smith and Caylin Young
- Preceded by: Talmadge Branch

Personal details
- Born: September 14, 1962 (age 63) Baltimore, Maryland, U.S.
- Party: Democratic
- Education: Sojourner–Douglass College
- Website: Campaign website

Jacqueline "Jackie" T. Addison (born September 14, 1962) is an American politician who is a member of the Maryland House of Delegates for District 45 in Baltimore City.

== Early life and career ==
Addison was born in Baltimore on September 14, 1962. She graduated from Paul Laurence Dunbar High School, afterwards attending Sojourner–Douglass College, where she got a degree in early childhood education.

In 2020, Addison unsuccessfully ran for District 13 of the Baltimore City Council, seeking to replace councilwoman Shannon Sneed, who unsuccessfully ran for council president. She ran on a ticket with outgoing council president Brandon Scott and received support from the American Federation of State, County and Municipal Employees Council 3. She lost the Democratic primary to Antonio Glover, placing second with 26.9 percent of the vote.

In 2022, Addison ran for the Maryland House of Delegates in District 45, running on a ticket with state senator Cory V. McCray and Caylin Young, the director of the Baltimore City Office of Equity and Civil Rights. She won the Democratic primary on July 19, placing first with 25.3 percent of the vote.

== In the legislature ==
Addison was sworn into the Maryland House of Delegates on January 11, 2023. She is a member of the House Environment and Transportation Committee.

During the 2026 legislative session, Addison introduced a bill that would impose civil fines on Maryland vehicle owners that registered with the Virginia Department of Motor Vehicles instead of the Maryland Motor Vehicle Administration.

== Personal life ==
Addison has lived in the Belair-Edison neighborhood of Baltimore for over 30 years.

== Electoral history ==
Baltimore City Council District 13 Democratic primary election, 2020
Party	Candidate	Votes	%
Democratic	Antonio "Tony" Glover	2,830	35.8
Democratic	Jackie T. Addison	2,123	26.9
Democratic	Akil Patterson	988	12.5
Democratic	Clarence J. Thomas	708	9.0
Democratic	Wesley D. Hawkins	597	7.6
Democratic	Kevin W. Parson	524	6.6
Democratic	Raymond Wallace David	134	1.7

Maryland House of Delegates District 45 Democratic primary election, 2022
Party	Candidate	Votes	%
Democratic	Jackie Addison	9,577	25.3
Democratic	Stephanie M. Smith (incumbent)	8,638	22.9
Democratic	Caylin Young	8,567	22.7
Democratic	Chanel Branch (incumbent)	8,451	22.4
Democratic	George Johnson	2,567	6.8

Maryland House of Delegates District 45 election, 2022
Party	Candidate	Votes	%
Democratic	Stephanie M. Smith (incumbent)	21,161	32.13
Democratic	Jackie Addison	20,912	31.75
Democratic	Caylin Young	19,963	30.31
Republican	Antonio Barboza	3,582	5.44
Write-in		246	0.37
