= Dennis C. McCoy =

American politician

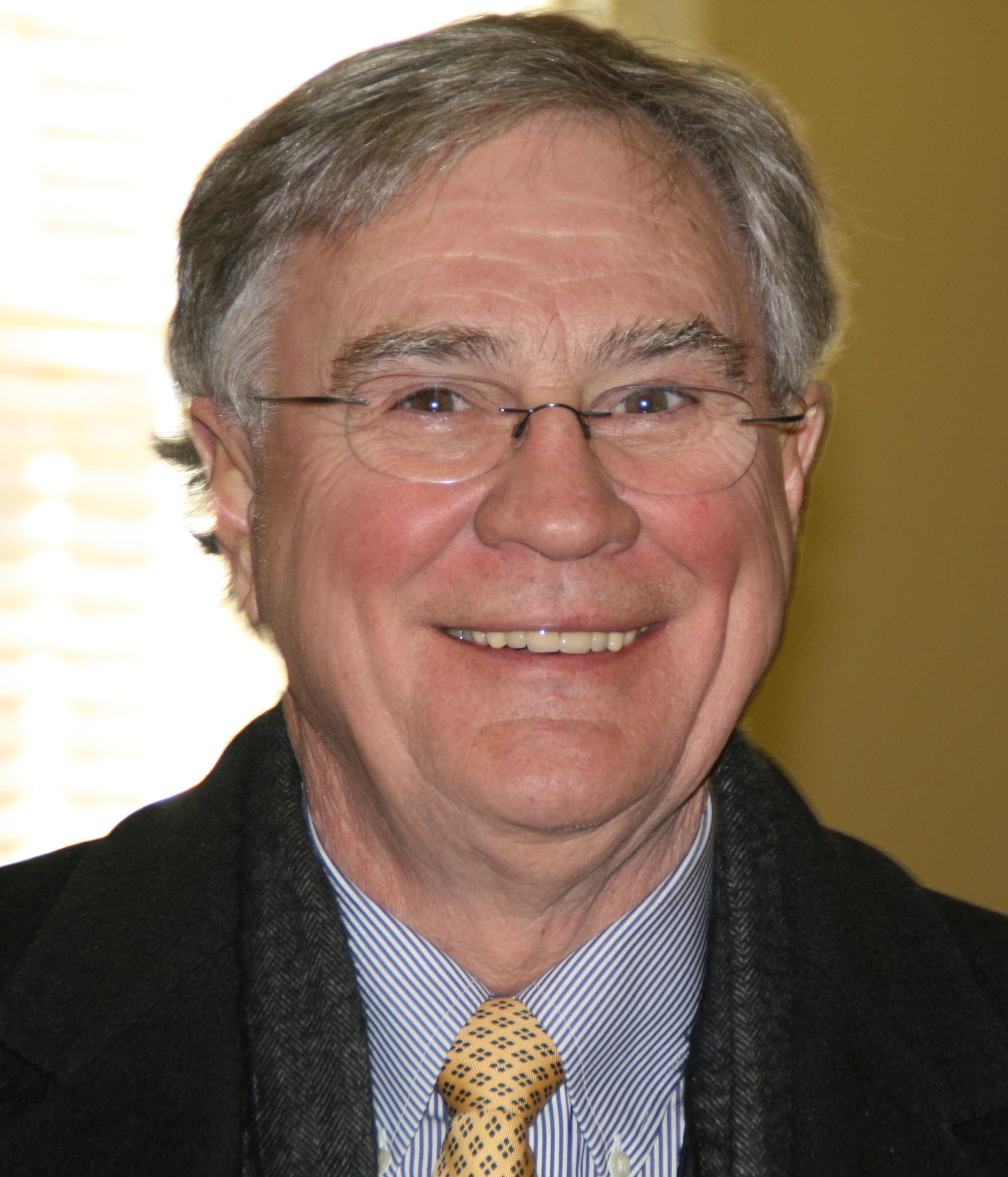

Delegate 44th District
- In office 1975–1986
- Succeeded by: Ken Montague
- Constituency: 44th legislative district

Personal details
- Born: 26 May 1942 Baltimore, Maryland, U.S.
- Died: October 31, 2026 (aged 84)
- Party: Democratic
- Spouse: Carolyn McCoy
- Children: Kimberly and Dennis, Jr.
- Education: University of Maryland BS, University of Baltimore JD, Loyola University Maryland MBA
- Occupation: attorney

Dennis C. McCoy was an American attorney, lobbyist, business executive and former member of the Maryland House of Delegates who was also chairman of the Baltimore City Delegation.

== Background ==
McCoy attended Baltimore parochial schools and graduated from the Calvert Hall College High School in 1960. He earned a BS in engineering at University of Maryland in 1965. He took jobs as a parole and probation officer for the State of Maryland and later with a shipbuilding and drydock company to support his family, while he attended law school at night. Three years later he graduated from the The Mt. Vernon School of Law with a J.D. McCoy Was admitted to the Maryland Bar in 1968. and began his legal career with the firm of Hooper, Keifer and Cornell before establishing his own practice, Polovoy, McCoy and Vincent, which later became Polovoy & McCoy.

In 1973 he earned an MBA in finance from Loyola College.

== In the legislature ==
Delegates McCoy, Kirk, Anderson and Cummings during a floor session in the Maryland House in February 1984.

McCoy was first elected to the Maryland House of Delegates in 1974 and represented Legislative District 44 (D), Baltimore City until 1986. He was a member of the Ways and Means Committee, the Special Joint Committee on Transportation and chaired the Joint Committee on Clerks of Court. McCoy was also chairman of the Baltimore City Delegation from 1979 to 1986.

== Past general election results ==
- 1982 Race for Maryland House of Delegates – 44th District

Voters to choose three:

Name	Votes	Percent	Outcome
Curt Anderson, Democratic	17,692	30.4%	Won
Anne S. Perkins, Democratic	16,765	29.5%	Won
Dennis C. McCoy, Democratic	16,687	29.0%	Won
A. Hairston, Republican	2,528	4.4%	Lost
Benjamin Jones, Republican	2,390	3.9%	Lost
Armstead Jones, Republican	2,281	3.3%	Lost

== Post legislative career ==
After leaving the legislature in 1987, McCoy started a lobbying practice, Government Affairs-Maryland Inc. His firm worked repeal of many of Maryland’s blue laws and represented the Maryland Horse Breeders Association, which McCoy believed was an important part of Maryland's culture and history. McCoy also served as CEO of Mars Supermarkets for 3 years. He retired from law and lobbying in 2016.
