= Nina R. Harper =

American politician (1950–2018)

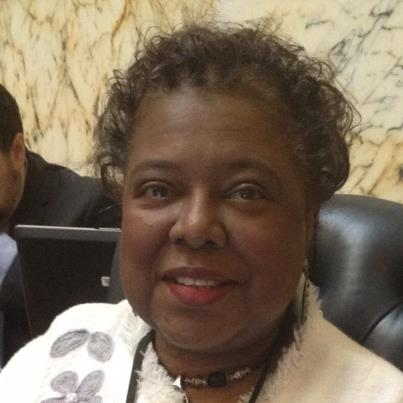

Member of the Maryland House of Delegates from the 45th district
- In office February 27, 2013 – January 14, 2015
- Preceded by: Hattie N. Harrison
- Succeeded by: Cory V. McCray

Personal details
- Born: October 15, 1950 Baltimore, Maryland, U.S.
- Died: December 29, 2018 (aged 68) Baltimore, Maryland, U.S.
- Party: Democratic

Nina R. Harper (October 15, 1950 – December 29, 2018) was an American politician who served in the Maryland General Assembly representing Maryland's 45th legislative located in northeast Baltimore City.

== Background ==
Harper was born on October 15, 1950, in Baltimore City to Geneva and Andres Himan. Her father was a merchant seaman from Colombia, South America. She attended Catholic schools in Baltimore and graduated from the St. Francis Academy Highschool there in 1968. After high school, Harper took a job with AT&T where she worked for 30 years. Harper was a member of the Baltimore City Democratic Central Committee. She served as the executive director of the East Oliver Community Association from 2004 to 2015. Harper was also the co-chair, Baltimore Mayor Stephanie Rawlings-Blake Transition Team in 2010.

== In the legislature ==
Harper was appointed by Governor O'Malley to fill the vacancy created after the death of Delegate Hattie N. Harrison. She was sworn in on February 27, 2013, and assigned to the House Ways and Means committee.

== Death ==
Nina Harper died on December 29, 2018.
