= TESST College of Technology =

- Type: For-profit
- Active: 1957–2018
- Location: Baltimore, Maryland, USA
- Campus: Suburban
- Website: TESST College of Technology

TESST College of Technology was a private for-profit technical college located in metropolitan Baltimore, Maryland. It was owned and operated by Education Corporation of America, which closed all of its campus at the end of 2018.

== History ==
TESST College of Technology began offering instruction in electronics in 1957 as TESST Technology Institute. The campus was located in Hyattsville, Maryland. In December 1992, TESST expanded its reach in the Baltimore market by acquiring the Arundel Institute of Technology. In the summer of 1998, the Hyattsville and Baltimore campuses relocated to new buildings in Beltsville and Towson, Maryland.

In 1999, TESST acquired RETS Technical Training Center, which had been offering classes in Maryland since 1956. In June 2001, TESST Technology Institute received approval to offer Bachelor of Applied Science degrees in network information systems and electronics, computer, and telecommunications technology. All campuses then became known as TESST College of Technology.

In May 2002, the college was acquired by Quest Education Corporation, a subsidiary of Kaplan, Inc. In December 2002, Quest changed its name to Kaplan Higher Education Corporation. In March 2004, the campus expanded by adding a 6,800-square-foot (630 m^{2}) facility located at 3922 Vero Road, less than a mile from the campus.

In September 2015, TESST College of Technology was acquired by Education Corporation of America. Education Corporation subsequently ceased operations on December 4, 2018.

=== Campuses ===
There were 4 campuses in Baltimore, Beltsville, Towson and Alexandria Virginia.

== Academics ==
TESST College of Technology offered programs in the following fields:

- Allied Health Medical Assistant (Certificate); Medical Billing and Coding Specialist (Certificate); Pharmacy Technician (Certificate)
- Information Technology: Computer Support Technician (Certificate); Computer Networking Technology (Associate of Applied Science)
- Trades: Electrician (Certificate); Heating, Ventilation, and Air Conditioning/Refrigeration (Certificate)
- Criminal Justice (Associate of Applied Science)
- Continuing Education: Drywall Technician course, Phlebotomy Technician course and Security Plus test prep course
