= Hattie N. Harrison =

American politician (1928–2013)

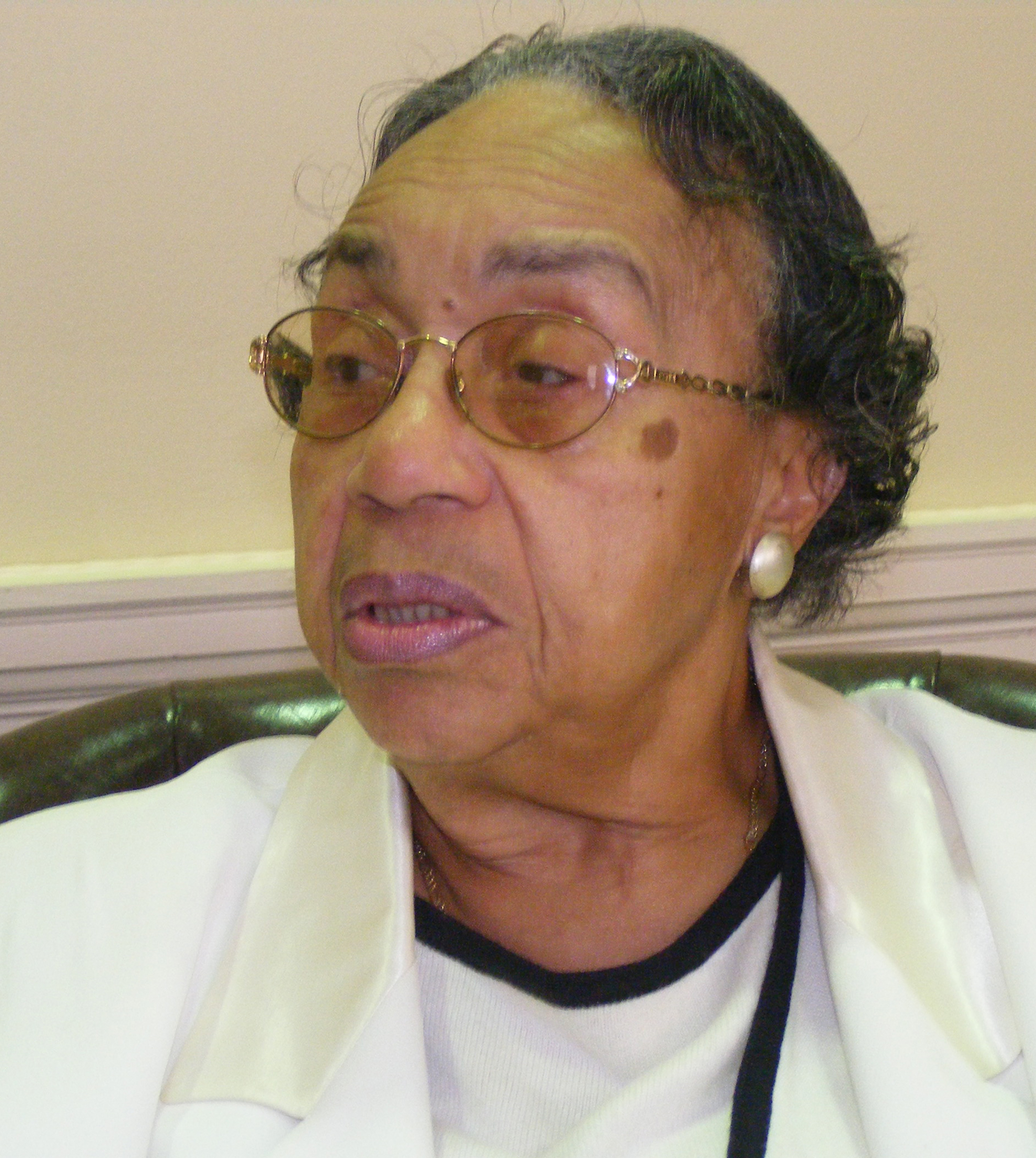

Member of the Maryland House of Delegates from the 45th district
- In office August 2, 1973 – January 28, 2013
- Preceded by: Turk Scott
- Succeeded by: Nina R. Harper

Personal details
- Born: February 11, 1928 Lancaster, South Carolina, U.S.
- Died: January 28, 2013 (aged 84) Baltimore, Maryland
- Party: Democratic
- Spouse: Widow
- Children: Two children, three grandchildren, seven great-grandchildren
- Occupation: Teacher

Hattie N. Harrison (February 11, 1928 – January 28, 2013) was an American politician who served in the Maryland General Assembly from 1973. Harrison was the chairperson of the Maryland House of Delegates Rules and Executive Nominations Committee, and was the first African-American woman to chair a legislative committee in Maryland.

== Background ==
Born in Lancaster, South Carolina, Harrison attended the Charlotte, North Carolina and Baltimore City public schools. She was a graduate of the Antioch College after which she became a teacher. She was a member of the Democratic State Central Committee, Baltimore City from 1970 to 1974, and a member of the Eastside Democratic Organization. In 2005, she received the Casper R. Taylor, Jr. Founder's Award from the Speaker's Society of the Maryland House of Delegates. Harrison died on January 28, 2013. At the time of her death, she was the longest serving delegate to the Maryland House of Delegates.

== In the Legislature ==
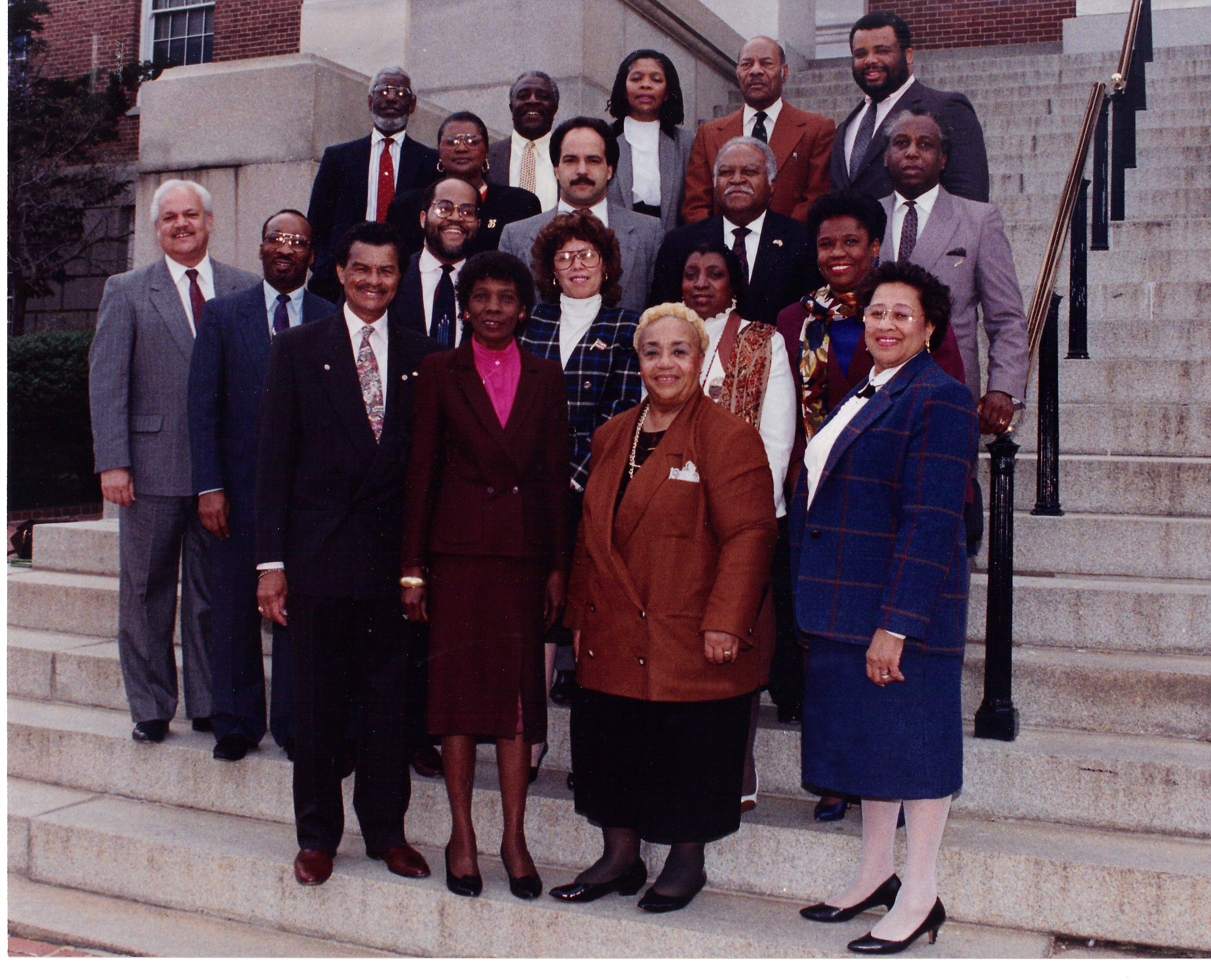
Harrison (bottom row second from right) with the 1992 Legislative Black Caucus of Maryland

At the time of her death, she had been a member of the Economic Matters Committee since 1973 and served on its science & technology subcommittee. She was a member of the Legislative Black Caucus of Maryland (formerly Maryland Legislative Black Caucus) and the Women's Legislators of Maryland.

=== Legislative notes ===
- voted for electric deregulation in 1999 (HB703)
- voted for income tax reduction in 1998 (SB750)
- voted for the Healthy Air Act in 2006 (SB154)
- voted in favor the Tax Reform Act of 2007 (HB2)

== General election results, 2006 ==
- 2006 Race for Maryland House of Delegates – 45th District

Voters to choose three:

Name	Votes	Percent	Outcome
Cheryl Glenn, Democratic	16,911	32.6%	Won
Hattie N. Harrison, Democratic	16,804	31.0%	Won
Talmadge Branch, Democratic	16,014	30.9%	Won
Ronald M. Owens-Bey, Populist	2,727	5.3%	Lost
Other write-ins	111	.2%	Lost
