= Talmadge Branch =

American politician (born 1956)

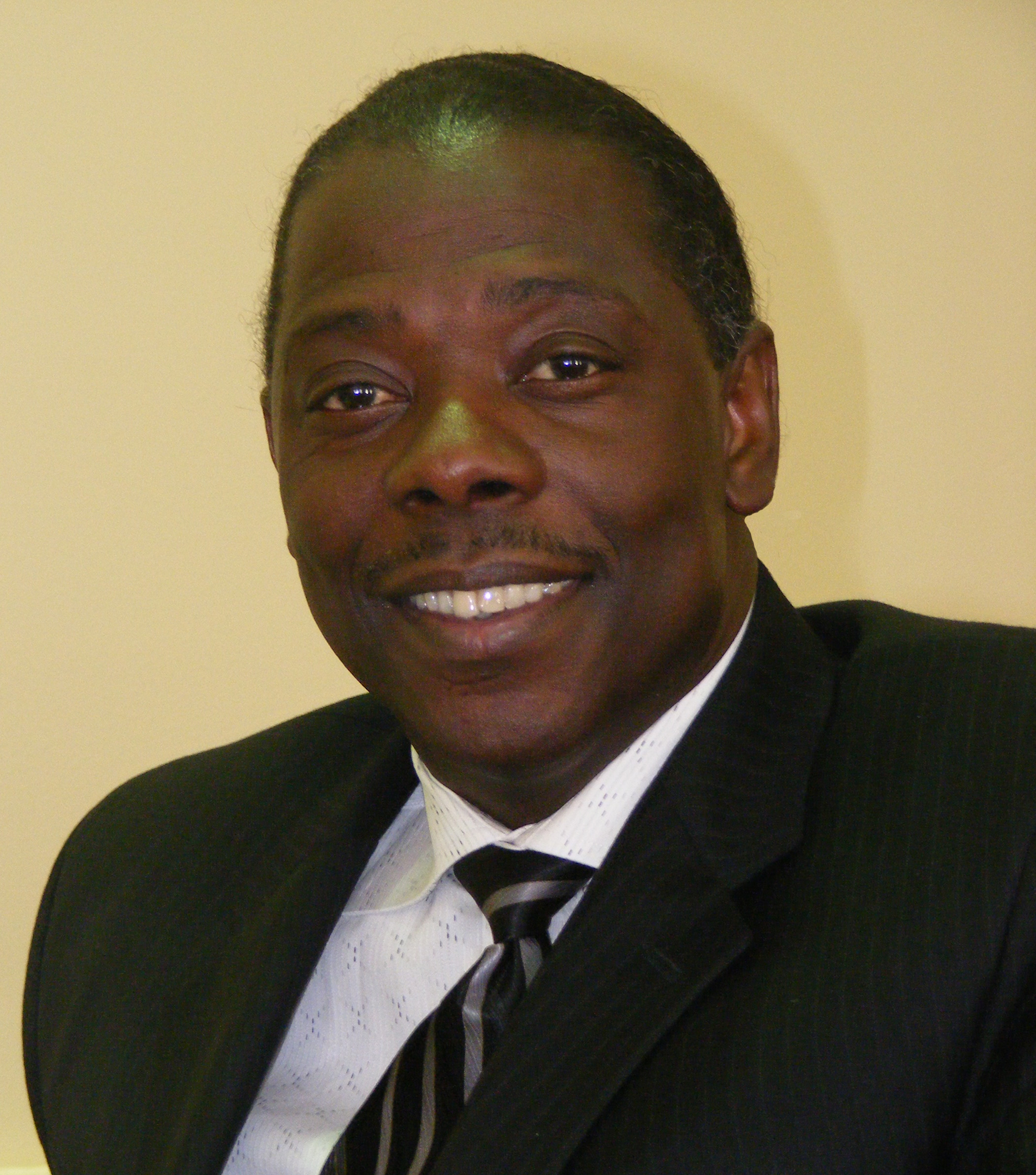

Member of the Maryland House of Delegates from the 45th district
- In office January 11, 1995 – January 11, 2023 Serving with Clarence "Tiger" Davis (D), Hattie N. Harrison (D), Cheryl Glenn (D), Cory V. McCray (D), Stephanie M. Smith (D), and Chanel Branch (D)
- Preceded by: John Douglass
- Succeeded by: Jackie Addison

Personal details
- Born: January 30, 1956 (age 70) Northampton County, North Carolina, U.S.
- Party: Democratic
- Children: 3, including Chanel Branch
- Education: Essex Community College (AA); Salisbury University (BA)

Talmadge Branch (born January 30, 1956) is an American politician who represented the 45th legislative district in the Maryland House of Delegates from 1995 to 2023. Branch is a former chairman of the Legislative Black Caucus of Maryland and founder of the Legislative Black Caucus of Maryland's foundation.

Branch was an unsuccessful candidate in the 2020 Maryland 7th congressional district special primary election to fill out the term of the late Elijah Cummings. Branch then withdrew from the overlapping regular 2020 election for the same congressional seat.

== Early life ==
Branch was born in Northampton County, North Carolina on January 30, 1956. He attended Northern High School in Baltimore and then Essex Community College where he got his A.A. in 1978. By 1980 Branch had earned his B.A. in liberal studies from Salisbury State College.

== Career ==
Branch has been a member of House of Delegates since January 11, 1995. He served on the House Appropriations Committee and was its vice-chairman from 2003 to 2007. He also serves on the Ways and Means committee. He is a member of the Legislative Policy Committee, the Special Joint Committee on Pensions, the Task Force to Study the State's Retiree Health Insurance Liabilities, the Rules and Executive Nominations Committee, the Spending Affordability Committee, the Joint Commission on the Maryland Port Administration and he is the House Chair of the Joint Committee on Welfare Reform.

On April 16, 2022, Branch announced that he would not seek re-election in the 2022 Maryland House of Delegates elections. He said that he did not plan to endorse a third delegate candidate to succeed him and that he would stay in the Baltimore area to build on a consulting business.

=== General election results, 2006 ===
- 2006 Race for Maryland House of Delegates – 45th District

Voters to choose three:

Name	Votes	Percent	Outcome
Cheryl Glenn, Democratic	16,911	32.6%	Won
Hattie N. Harrison, Democratic	16,804	31.0%	Won
Talmadge Branch, Democratic	16,014	30.9%	Won
Ronald M. Owens-Bey, Populist	2,727	5.3%	Lost
Other write-ins	111	.2%	Lost

=== Legislative notes ===
- Co-sponsored HB 860 (Baltimore City Public Schools Construction and Revitalization Act of 2013). Signed by the Governor on May 16, 2013, the new law approved 1.1 billion dollars to construct new schools in Baltimore City.
- voted for the Clean Indoor Air Act of 2007 (HB359)
- voted for the Healthy Air Act in 2006 (SB154)
- primary sponsor-Baltimore City - Illegal Dumping - Surveillance Systems 2006 (HB111-became law: Chapter#312)
- voted for slots in 2005 (HB1361)
- primary sponsor- Child Support Enforcement Privatization Pilot Program 2003(HB564 became law: Chapter312)
- voted against electric deregulation in 1999 (HB703)
- voted for income tax reduction in 1998 (SB750)
- voted for the Tax Reform Act of 2007 (HB2)
- voted in favor of Slots (HB4) in the 2007 Special session

== Awards ==
- 2010 Most Influential Maryland Legislators (Top 20)
