= Cheryl Glenn =

American politician (born 1951)

Cheryl D. Glenn
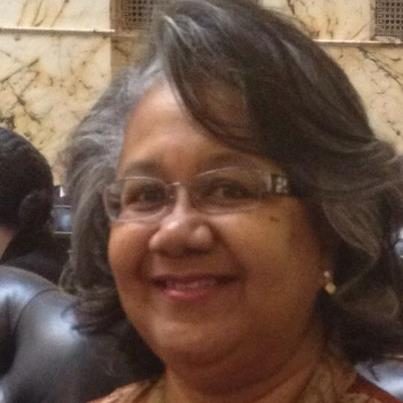

Member of the Maryland House of Delegates from the 45th district
- In office January 10, 2007 – December 18, 2019
- Preceded by: Clarence "Tiger" Davis
- Succeeded by: Chanel Branch

Personal details
- Born: May 27, 1951 (age 75) Baltimore, Maryland, U.S.
- Party: Democratic
- Spouse(s): Benjamin Glenn, Sr.
- Children: D. Nikila, Cheron
- Education: Western High School, Baltimore, Maryland
- Alma mater: Community College of Baltimore County (paralegal studies); George Meany Institute for Labor Studies (labor relations)
- Occupation: Consultant

Cheryl Diane Glenn (born May 27, 1951) is an American politician. She was a member of the Maryland House of Delegates, representing Maryland's 45th legislative district which is situated in northeast Baltimore. She resigned in December 2019 in advance of a federal indictment for wire fraud and bribery to which she pleaded guilty in January 2020. In July 2020, she was sentenced to two years in prison.

== Background ==
Glenn was born in Baltimore, Maryland and attended the public primary and secondary schools there. She graduated from Western High School in 1969, the Community College of Baltimore County (paralegal studies) and the George Meany Institute (labor relations). She became the Political Director of and lobbyist for the Mid-Atlantic Regional Council of Carpenters, (2004- ) after serving as President of the City Union of Baltimore, 1988–96. She was married to Benjamin Glenn, who has since died, and has five children and eight grandchildren. Glenn is also raising her granddaughter, Taylor Bishop.

== Legislative career ==
After a long career in the labor movement, Glenn was elected to the Maryland General Assembly. Glenn was among three people elected to represent the 45th district located in east Baltimore. Although it was her first run for a state office, she finished ahead of both the incumbents in that district in the general election.

Glenn has been a member of House of Delegates since January 10, 2007. She initially served on the Environmental Matters Committee and several of its subcommittees and work groups: ground rent work group (2007); housing & real property subcommittee, 2007–2104; local government & bi-county subcommittee, 2007–2014; motor vehicle & transportation subcommittee, 2007–2104. At the beginning of the 2014 session of the Maryland General Assembly Glenn was reassigned to the Economic Matters Committee. She is chair of the Baltimore City Delegation and a member of its Fiscal Subcommittee, a member of the Women Legislators of Maryland and former chair of the Legislative Black Caucus of Maryland.

=== Legislative notes ===
- Co-sponsored HB 860 (Baltimore City Public Schools Construction and Revitalization Act of 2013). Signed by the Governor on May 16, 2013, the new law approved 1.1 billion dollars to construct new schools in Baltimore City.
- voted for the Clean Indoor Air Act of 2007 (HB359)
- voted in favor of the Tax Reform Act of 2007 (HB2)
- voted in favor of in-state tuition for illegal immigrants in 2007 (HB6)
- voted in favor of slots (HB4) in the 2007 Special session
- Primary Sponsor Employee Misclassification Act of 2008 (HB 70)
- co-sponsored the Work Place Fraud Act of 2009 (HB819)

=== General election results, 2006 ===
- 2006 Race for Maryland House of Delegates – 45th District

Voters to choose three:

Name	Votes	Percent	Outcome
Cheryl Glenn, Democratic	16,911	32.6%	Won
Hattie N. Harrison, Democratic	16,804	31.0%	Won
Talmadge Branch, Democratic	16,014	30.9%	Won
Ronald M. Owens-Bey, Populist	2,727	5.3%	Lost
Other write-ins	111	.2%	Lost

== Wire fraud and bribery ==
In December 2019, U.S. Attorney Robert K. Hur said Glenn accepted $33,750 in bribes. According to the Baltimore Business Journal, "In charging documents, federal prosecutors allege that from at least March 2, 2018 through Feb. 11, 2019, Glenn 'defrauded the citizens of Maryland' by soliciting and accepting monetary bribes to affect, advocate for and vote on certain bills relating to opioid treatment clinics, liquor licenses and the expansion of the state's medical marijuana industry." Glenn pleaded guilty on January 22, 2020, and faced possible sentencing of up to 25 years in prison. Prosecutors asked for a three-year sentence while Glenn requested home detention. In July 2020, Glenn was sentenced to two years in prison. Glenn reported to federal prison in Danbury, Connecticut at the end of September 2020. In January 2021, she was released from prison to serve the rest of her sentence, scheduled to expire in June 2022, in home confinement.
