= Marc Korman =

American politician (born 1981)

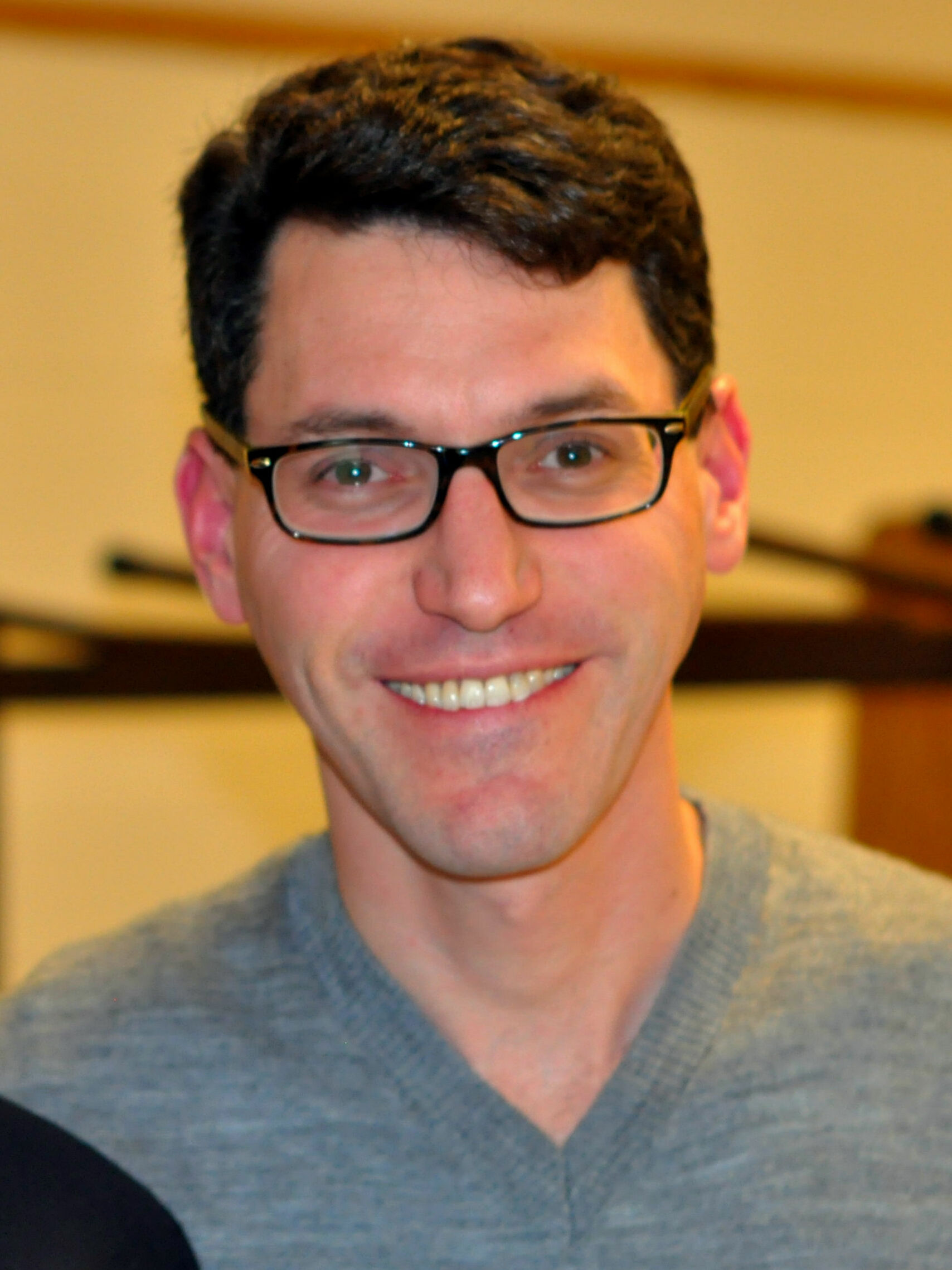

Majority Leader of the Maryland House of Delegates
- In office January 5, 2023 – May 17, 2023
- Preceded by: Eric Luedtke
- Succeeded by: David Moon

Member of the Maryland House of Delegates from the 16th district
- Incumbent
- Assumed office January 14, 2015 Serving with Teresa Saavedra Woorman and Sarah Wolek
- Preceded by: Susan C. Lee

Personal details
- Born: Marc Alan Korman; September 21, 1981 (age 44) Rockville, Maryland, U.S.
- Party: Democratic
- Spouse: Rebecca Korman
- Children: 2
- Education: University of Southern California (BA); Johns Hopkins University (MA); University of Maryland, Baltimore (JD)

Marc Alan Korman (born September 21, 1981) is an American politician from Maryland. He is a member of the Democratic Party who currently serves in the Maryland House of Delegates, representing District 16 in Montgomery County. He previously served as the Majority Leader of the Maryland House of Delegates from January to May 2023.

== Early life and education ==
Korman was born in Rockville, Maryland on September 21, 1981. He graduated from Richard Montgomery High School in 1999, and entered the University of Southern California at 17 years old, where he earned a B.A. degree in history in 2002; Johns Hopkins University, where he earned an M.A. degree in government with honors in 2007; and the University of Maryland School of Law, where he earned a J.D. degree magna cum laude in 2010.

== Career ==
Korman first got involved with politics at USC, unhappy about the U.S. Supreme Court's decision in Bush v. Gore. Following the ruling, Korman joined, and later became president of, the university's Young Democrats Club. He also interned for California governor Gray Davis and worked as a staff assistant at the Kalsman Institute at Hebrew Union College. After graduating from USC, Korman began working as a legislative aide to Congressmen Brad Sherman of California and Brian Baird of Washington.

Korman was admitted to the Maryland Bar in 2010 and the District of Columbia Bar in 2011. Since 2010, he has worked as an associate at the law firm Sidley Austin, practicing in communications and transportation litigation.

Korman declared his candidacy for the Maryland House of Delegates in District 16 on June 10, 2013. Korman won the Democratic primary election, receiving 21.8 percent of the vote, and later won the general election with 22.1 percent of the vote.

== In the legislature ==
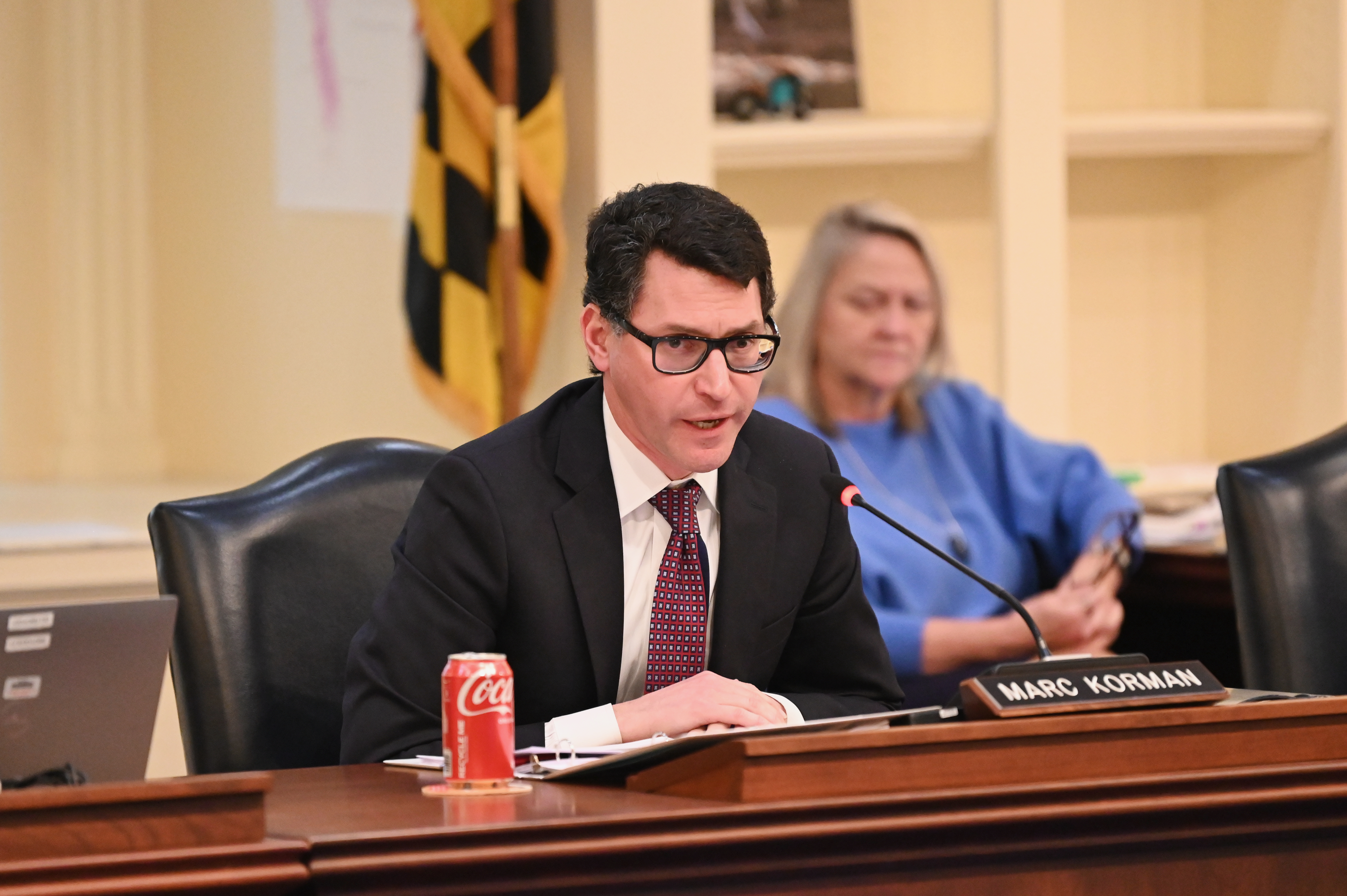
Korman in the House Environment and Transportation Committee, 2024

Korman was sworn into the Maryland House of Delegates on January 14, 2015. He has served as a member of the Appropriations Committee from 2015 to 2023. On January 5, 2023, Speaker of the Maryland House of Delegates Adrienne A. Jones named Korman as the House Majority Leader, succeeding Eric Luedtke. He stepped down as Majority Leader following the conclusion of the 2023 legislative session to become the chair of the Environment and Transportation Committee.

== Political positions ==
=== Environment ===
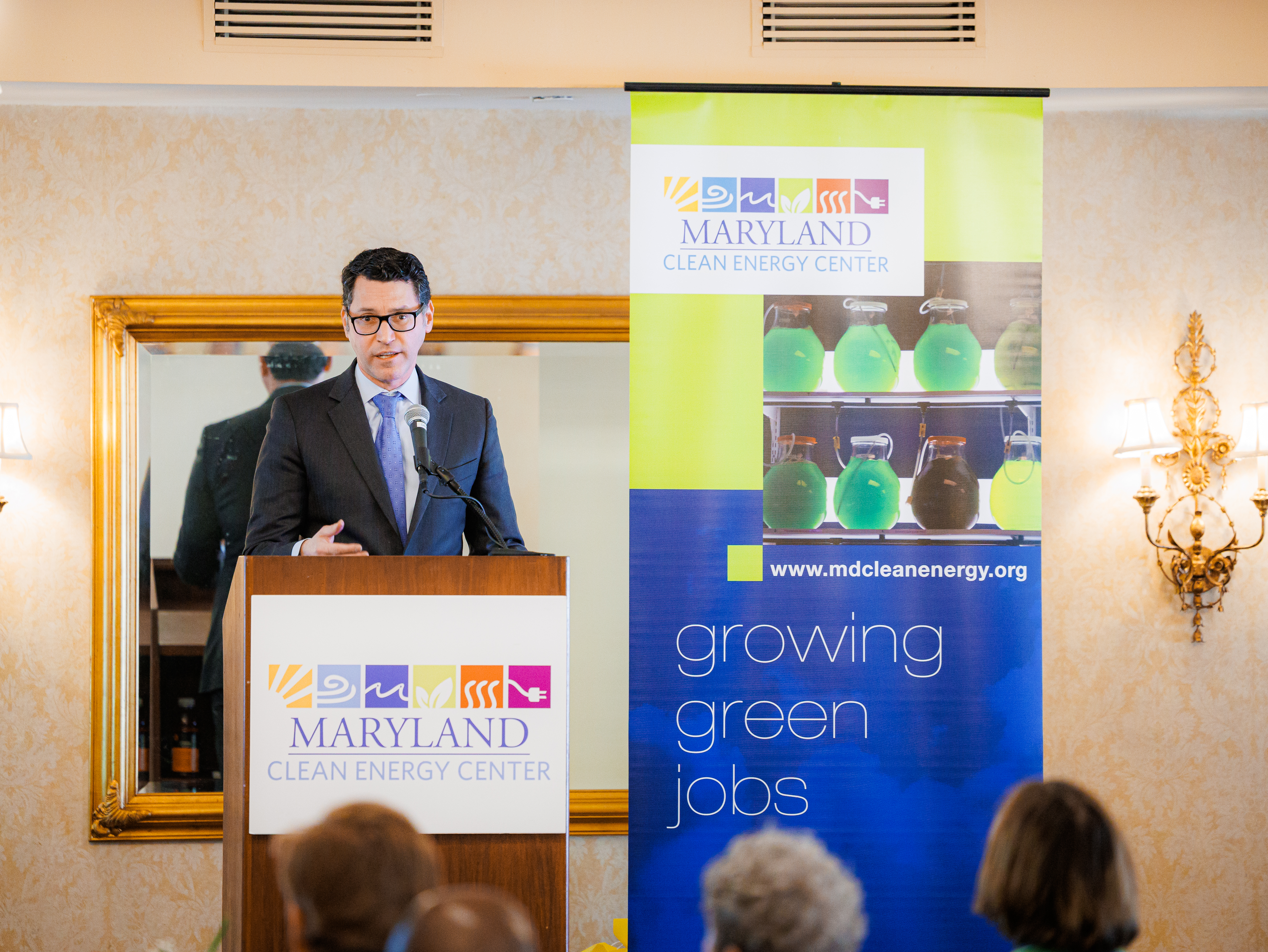
Korman speaks at a Maryland Clean Energy Center legislative reception, 2025

During the 2020 legislative session, Korman introduced legislation that would strengthen the state's plan to make 50 percent of its bus fleet zero-emission by 2030, instead requiring that more than 50 percent of Maryland's fleet be zero-emission by 2030. The bill passed the House of Delegates by a vote of 112-22.

=== Healthcare ===
During the 2020 legislative session, Korman introduced legislation that would allow 16- and 17-year-olds to consent to receive vaccines without parental permission.

=== Redistricting ===
During the 2026 legislative session, Korman supported the congressional redistricting map proposed by the Governor's Redistricting Advisory Commission, which would redraw Maryland's 1st congressional district to improve the Democratic Party's chances of winning it, defending how the 1st district was drawn in the proposed map by citing several past congressional maps where the 1st district extended over the Chesapeake Bay.

=== Taxes ===
During the 2020 legislative session, Korman introduced legislation that would apply the state's sales tax to digital services. The bill passed, but was vetoed by Governor Hogan on May 7, 2020. The Maryland General Assembly voted to override the gubernatorial veto on February 12, 2021.

=== Transportation ===
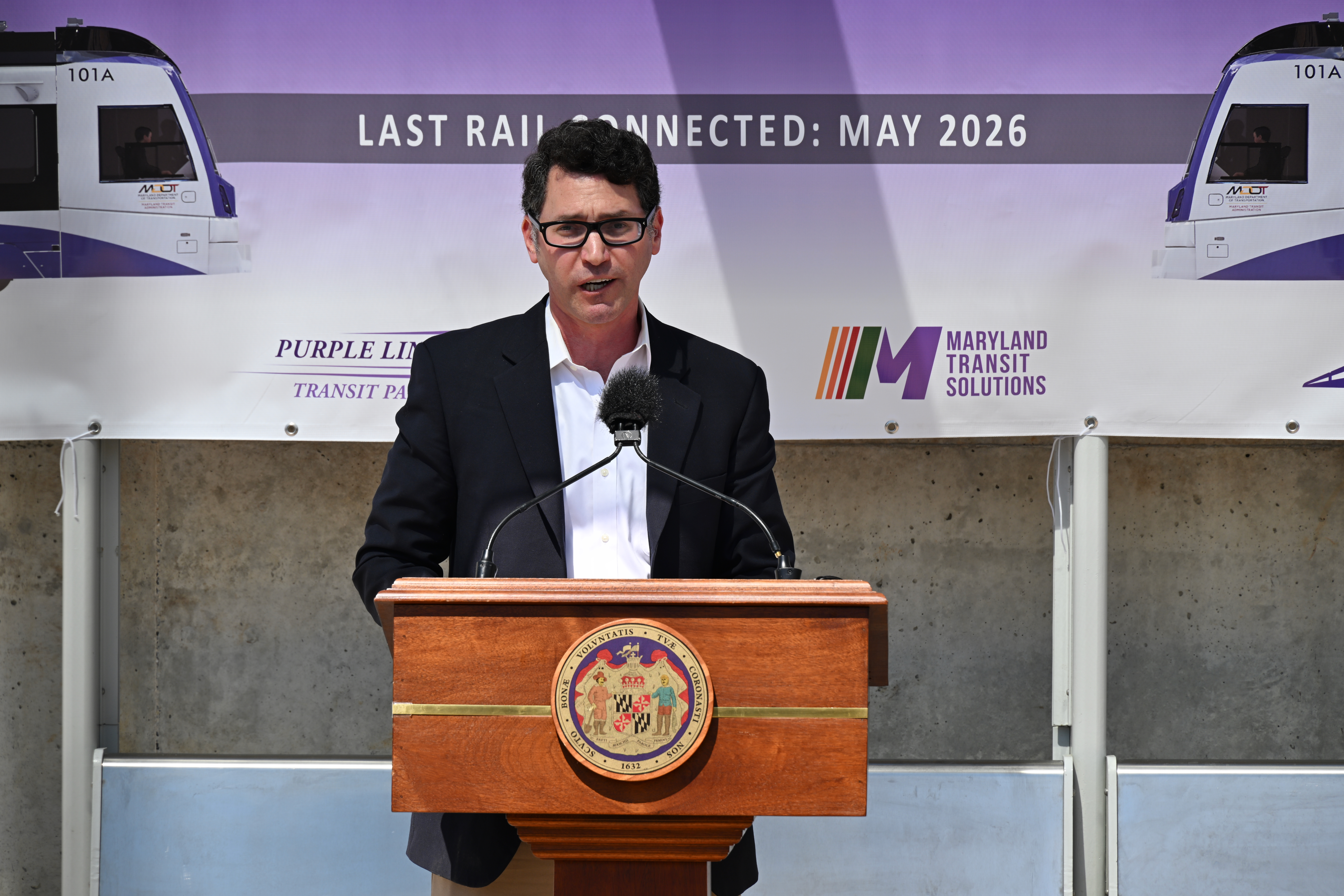
Korman at the final track laying of the Purple Line, 2026

During his campaign for House of Delegates, Korman proposed a three-point plan for improving Metro services that included increasing funding for operations oversight, improving the aesthetics of stations, and establishing a dedicated funding source for the system. In May 2016, Korman and Erek Barron released a list of Metro reform proposals, including ideas involving dedicated funding, the make-up of the Washington Metropolitan Area Transit Authority board, and vendors in stations to boost revenue. During the 2018 legislative session, Korman introduced legislation that would give the Washington Metro its own dedicated source of funding. The bill passed and was signed into law by Governor Hogan on April 25, 2018.

Korman is regarded as a leading critic of proposals made by Governor Larry Hogan to widen the Capital Beltway, the Baltimore–Washington Parkway, and Interstate 270. During the 2019 legislative session, he introduced legislation that would require the governor's plan to complete an environmental assessment before moving forward. In 2020, Korman introduced legislation that would enshrine a number of pledges made by Maryland Transportation Secretary Greg Slater on public-private partnership projects. The bill passed the House of Delegates by a vote of 97-36. The measure was re-introduced during the 2021 legislative session, during which it again passed the House of Delegates by a vote of 101-35.

During the 2015 legislative session, Korman introduced legislation requiring the State Highway Administration to provide more notice of sidewalk closures when they issue a permit allowing their closure. The bill received an unfavorable report from the Environment and Transportation Committee.

During the 2022 legislative session, Korman introduced legislation that would connect Maryland Area Regional Commuter (MARC) Trains to routes in Alexandria, Virginia and Newark, Delaware.

== Personal life ==
Korman met his future wife, Rebecca, while on a Birthright Israel trip with other Hill staffers in 2004. The couple married in June 2007, and together have two children, a daughter, Abby, and son, Harrison. They are Jewish, and live in Bethesda, Maryland.

== Electoral history ==
Maryland House of Delegates District 16 Democratic Primary Election, 2014
Party	Candidate	Votes	%
Democratic	Ariana Kelly	10,045	25.6%
Democratic	William Frick	9,088	23.2%
Democratic	Marc Korman	8,554	21.8%
Democratic	Hrant Jamgochian	6,005	15.3%
Democratic	Jordan P. Cooper	2,834	7.2%
Democratic	Peter Dennis	1,175	3.0%
Democratic	Karen Kuker-Kihl	809	2.1%
Democratic	Gareth E. Murray	683	1.7%

Maryland House of Delegates District 16 General Election, 2014
Party	Candidate	Votes	%
Democratic	William Frick	26,727	23.0%
Democratic	Marc Korman	25,755	22.1%
Democratic	Ariana Kelly	25,148	21.6%
Republican	Rose Maria Li	15,441	13.3%
Republican	John Andrews	11,822	10.2%
Republican	Lynda del Castillo	11,453	9.8%
N/A	Other Write-Ins	111	0.1%

Maryland House of Delegates 16th District Democratic Primary Election, 2018
Party	Candidate	Votes	%
Democratic	Marc Korman	13,598	24
Democratic	Ariana Kelly	12,197	22
Democratic	Sara Love	11,299	20
Democratic	Samir Paul	11,287	20
Democratic	Jordan Cooper	3,613	7
Democratic	Nuchhi Currier	2,131	4
Democratic	Joseph Aloysius Hennessey	1,183	2
Democratic	Marc Lande	563	1

Maryland House of Delegates 16th District General Election, 2018
Party	Candidate	Votes	%
Democratic	Ariana Kelly	45,617	31
Democratic	Marc Korman	43,861	29
Democratic	Sara Love	43,760	29
Republican	Bill Day	15,321	10
Other/Write-in	Other/Write-in	520	0

Maryland House of Delegates
Preceded by Eric Luedtke	Majority Leader of the Maryland House of Delegates; 2023	Succeeded by David Moon
