= Sara N. Love =

American politician (born 1967)

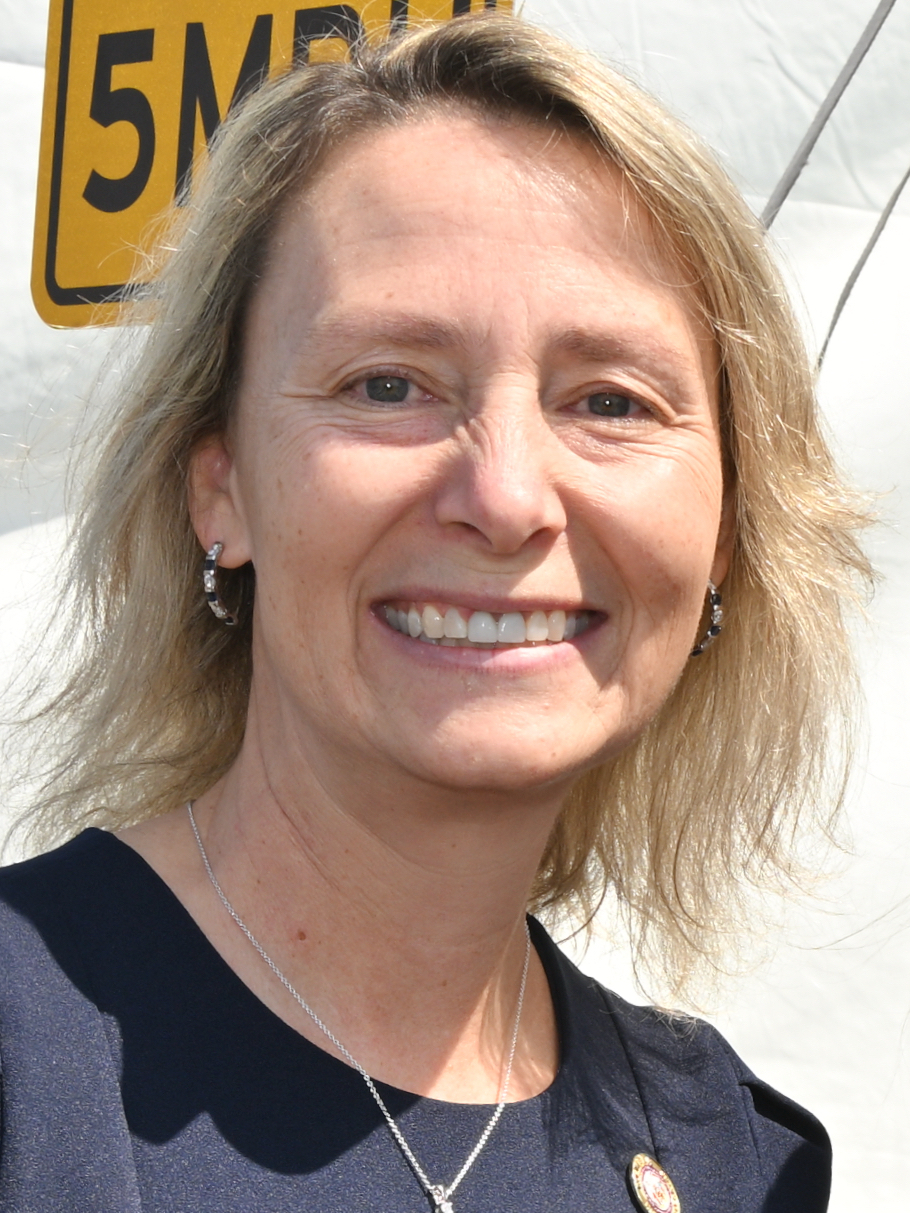

Member of the Maryland Senate from the 16th district
- Incumbent
- Assumed office June 13, 2024
- Appointed by: Wes Moore
- Preceded by: Ariana Kelly

Member of the Maryland House of Delegates from the 16th district
- In office January 9, 2019 – June 13, 2024 Serving with Sarah Wolek, Marc Korman
- Preceded by: William Frick
- Succeeded by: Teresa Saavedra Woorman

Personal details
- Born: April 6, 1967 (age 59) Evanston, Illinois, U.S.
- Party: Democratic
- Children: 2
- Education: New Trier High School; Princeton University (AB); Northwestern University (JD)
- Profession: Attorney
- Website: Official website

Sara N. Love (born April 6, 1967) is an American politician who currently serves as a member of the Maryland Senate representing the 16th district since 2024. A member of the Democratic Party, she previously represented the district in the Maryland House of Delegates from 2019 to 2024.

== Early life and career ==
Love was born in Evanston, Illinois on April 6, 1967, where she graduated from New Trier High School. She attended Princeton University, where she earned a Bachelor of Arts degree in history in 1989, and the Northwestern University Pritzker School of Law, where she earned a Juris Doctor in law in 1993. After graduating, she worked as a law clerk for Judge Timothy K. Lewis from 1993 to 1994. From 1998 to 2014, she worked for various women's health groups, including the Feminist Majority Foundation, the National Women's Health Foundation, and NARAL Pro-Choice America. From 2005 to 2016, Love worked for the American Civil Liberties Union of Maryland, serving as the president of the board of directors from 2008 to 2012 and as the group's public policy director from 2012 to 2016.

In August 2017, Love declared her candidacy for state delegate in Maryland's 16th legislative district, seeking to succeed state delegate William Frick, who ran for Congress in Maryland's 6th congressional district. In the primary election, Love finished third in a field of eight candidates, edging out Montgomery Blair High School teacher Samir Paul by 9 votes. Paul filed for a recount of the results on July 10, 2018. Love maintained her lead over Paul after the recount, increasing her vote total in the district to 12 votes. He conceded from the election on July 27, 2018. She came in third place in the general election, receiving 29.4 percent of the vote.

== In the legislature ==
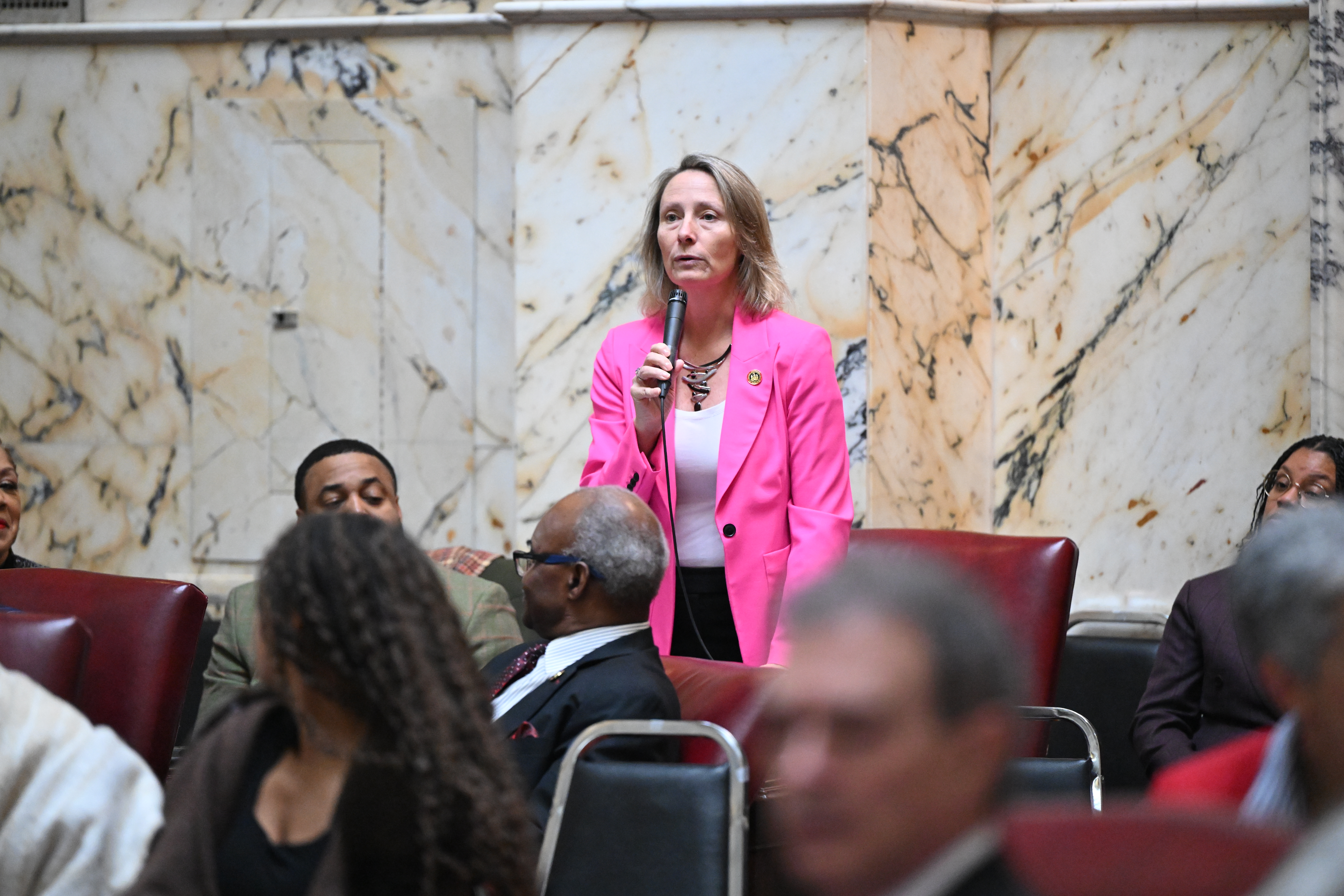
Love speaks on the floor of the Maryland Senate, 2026

Love was sworn into the Maryland House of Delegates on January 9, 2019. She served as a member of the Environment and Transportation Committee, including as the chair of its motor vehicle and transportation subcommittee from 2023 to 2024.

During the 2020 United States presidential election, Love canvassed for Joe Biden in the Pennsylvania cities of York and Harrisburg.

In May 2022, ahead of the U.S. Supreme Court's decision in Dobbs v. Jackson Women's Health Organization, Love launched StandUp MD, a program to train college students and recent graduates about political organizing and to support pro-choice candidates in Maryland. The program was funded by Love's campaign, as she did not face any opposition in her re-election bid that year.

In March 2024, after state senator Ariana Kelly announced that she would resign in May to become the executive director of the Maryland Commission for Women, Love said that she would apply to serve the remainder of Kelly's term in the Maryland Senate. The Montgomery County Democratic Central Committee nominated Love to fill the seat on June 3, 2024. Love was appointed to the seat by Governor Wes Moore and sworn in on June 13, 2024. Love was a member of the Senate Judicial Proceedings Committee from 2024 to 2027, afterwards serving on the Budget and Taxation Committee.

In January 2025, Love was elected to serve as the president of the Chesapeake Executive Council.

== Political positions ==
Love is a self-described progressive Democrat.

=== Crime and policing ===
During her time at the ACLU, Love lobbied for several policing bills, including one prevent police from searching a person's emails before obtaining a warrant, another that prevents police from tracking cellphones without warrants, and a bill to limit civil asset forfeiture abuse by requiring conviction before police could confiscate property.

During the 2026 legislative session, Love supported proposals to restrict housing of children charged as adults inside adult jails.

=== Environment ===
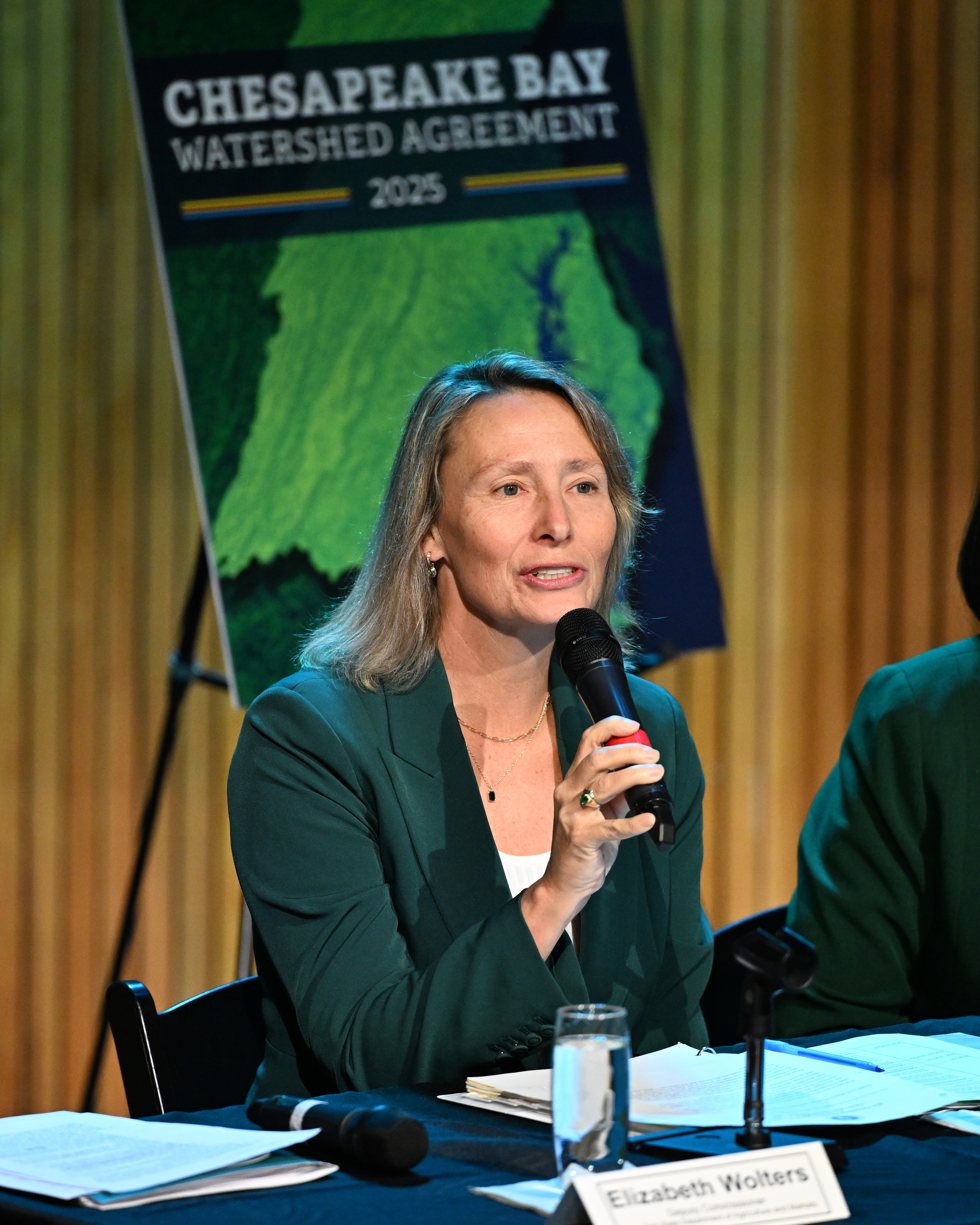
Love during a meeting of the Chesapeake Executive Council, 2025

During the 2019 legislative session, Love introduced a bill to strengthen and codify the Keep Antibiotics Effective Act, which restricts the use of antibiotics in food-producing animals. The bill passed and became law without Governor Larry Hogan's signature.

In February 2022, Love introduced the "George Taylor Act", which would ban products containing Per- and polyfluoroalkyl substances. The bill passed and was signed into law by Governor Hogan.

During the 2023 legislative session, Love introduced the "Clean Trucks Act", which would require vehicle manufacturers and dealers to sell an increasing percentage of zero-emission vehicles beginning in model year 2027. The bill passed and was signed into law by Governor Wes Moore.

=== Gun control ===
During the 2026 legislative session, Love introduced a bill that would ban the sale of firearms that can be converted into automatic firearms through the use of a Glock switch.

=== Israel ===
In November 2023, following the 2023 Hamas-led attack on Israel and subsequent Gaza war, Love and other District 16 legislators released a statement condemning the attack and condemned antisemitic and Islamophobic hate crimes.

=== Minimum wage ===
Love supports increasing the Maryland minimum wage to $15 an hour.

=== Social issues ===
During the 2019 legislative session, Love introduced a bill that would allow Maryland drivers to designate their gender as "X" on their license. The bill passed and became law without Governor Larry Hogan's signature.

During the 2024 legislative session, Love introduced the "Maryland Online Privacy Act", which restricts the kinds of data companies can collect to only what is necessary and relevant to the product, would give consumers the right to know which data is being collected and the ability to have it deleted, and bans targeted advertising.

=== Transportation ===
During the 2024 legislative session, Love introduced the "Sarah Debbink Langenkamp Memorial Act", which would make hitting a cyclist in a bike lane an offense punishable by up to two months in jail alongside a fine of up to $2,000. The bill was named after Sarah Debbnik Langenkamp, a Bethesda cyclist who was hit and killed by a flatbed truck in August 2022.

== Electoral history ==
Maryland House of Delegates District 16 Democratic primary election, 2018
Party	Candidate	Votes	%
Democratic	Marc Korman (incumbent)	13,598	24.3
Democratic	Ariana Kelly (incumbent)	12,197	21.8
Democratic	Sara Love	11,299	20.2
Democratic	Samir Paul	11,287	20.2
Democratic	Jordan Cooper	3,613	6.5
Democratic	Nuchhi Currier	2,131	3.8
Democratic	Joseph Aloysius Hennessey	1,183	2.1
Democratic	Marc Lande	563	1.0

Maryland House of Delegates District 16 election, 2018
Party	Candidate	Votes	%
Democratic	Ariana Kelly (incumbent)	45,617	30.6
Democratic	Marc Korman (incumbent)	43,861	29.4
Democratic	Sara Love	43,760	29.4
Republican	Bill Day	15,321	10.3
Write-in		520	0.3

Maryland House of Delegates District 16 election, 2022
Party	Candidate	Votes	%
Democratic	Ariana Kelly (incumbent)	41,600	33.1
Democratic	Marc Korman (incumbent)	41,506	33.0
Democratic	Sara Love (incumbent)	41,153	32.7
Write-in		1,572	1.3
