= Karen Britto =

American politician

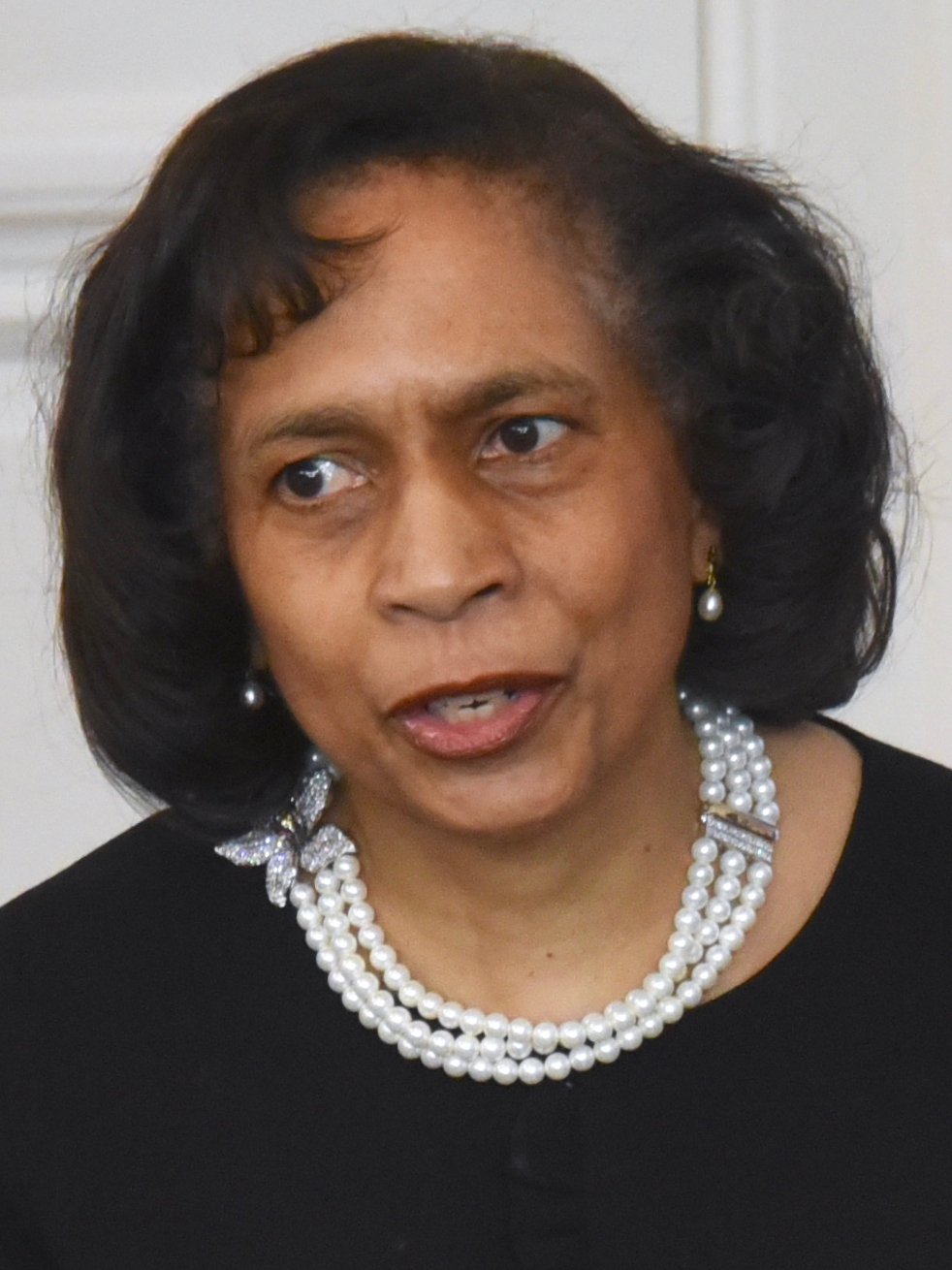
- Britto in 2016

Member of the Maryland House of Delegates from the 16th district
- In office May 20, 2010 – January 12, 2011 Serving with William Frick, Susan C. Lee
- Appointed by: Martin O'Malley
- Preceded by: William A. Bronrott
- Succeeded by: Ariana Kelly
- Constituency: Montgomery County

Personal details
- Party: Democratic
- Education: Villanova University, B.A. (political science), 1976; Howard University, M.A. (political science), 1978.

Karen Britto is an American politician from Maryland and a member of the Democratic Party. She was a member of the Maryland House of Delegates representing District 16 in Montgomery County from 2010 to 2011. Britto was appointed by Governor Martin O'Malley to serve the final months of William A. Bronrott's term when he resigned to accept a presidential appointment in the U.S. Department of Transportation. In 2016, Britto was a Democratic Party presidential elector for Hillary Clinton.
