= Maryland Legislative District 16 =

American legislative district

Maryland's legislative district 16
- Represents part of Montgomery County
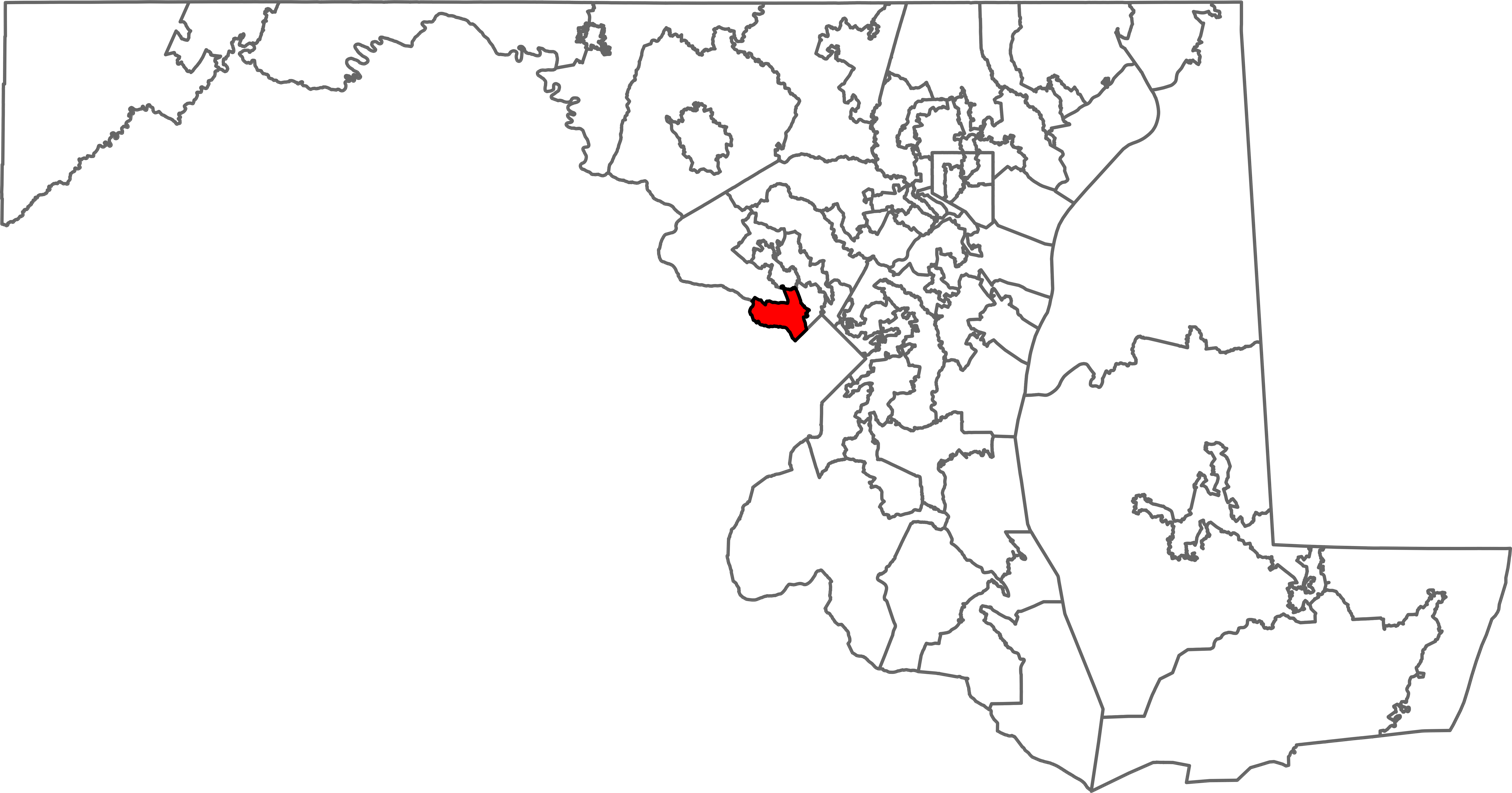
- Senator: Sara N. Love (D)
- Delegate(s): Marc A. Korman (D); Sarah Wolek (D); Teresa Saavedra Woorman (D)
- Registration: 61.5% Democratic; 15.7% Republican; 21.6% unaffiliated
- Demographics: 68.0% White; 5.4% Black/African American; 0.2% Native American; 13.6% Asian; 0.0% Hawaiian/Pacific Islander; 2.2% Other race; 10.5% Two or more races; 9.1% Hispanic
- Population (2020): 134,804
- Voting-age population: 105,717
- Registered voters: 93,897

Maryland Legislative District 16 is one of 47 districts in the state for the Maryland General Assembly. It covers part of Montgomery County. The district is represented by three delegates in the Maryland House of Delegates.

== Demographic characteristics ==
As of the 2020 United States census, the district had a population of 134,804, of whom 105,717 (78.4%) were of voting age. The racial makeup of the district was 91,639 (68.0%) White, 7,317 (5.4%) African American, 222 (0.2%) Native American, 18,328 (13.6%) Asian, 36 (0.0%) Pacific Islander, 3,006 (2.2%) from some other race, and 14,221 (10.5%) from two or more races. Hispanic or Latino of any race were 12,222 (9.1%) of the population.

The district had 93,897 registered voters as of October 17, 2020, of whom 20,283 (21.6%) were registered as unaffiliated, 14,754 (15.7%) were registered as Republicans, 57,710 (61.5%) were registered as Democrats, and 779 (0.8%) were registered to other parties.

== Political representation ==
The district is currently represented by Sara N. Love in the State Senate. The district is represented for the 2023–2027 legislative term in the House of Delegates by Marc A. Korman (D), Sarah Wolek (D), and Teresa Saavedra Woorman (D).

== Election history ==
=== Multi-member Senate district (1967–1975) ===
Years	Senator	Party	Electoral history	Years	Senator	Party	Electoral history
January 18, 1967 – January 8, 1975	Frederick Malkus	Democratic	Redistricted from Dorchester County at-large and re-elected in 1966. Re-elected in 1970. Redistricted to the 35th district.	January 18, 1967 – January 8, 1975	Mary L. Nock	Democratic	Redistricted from Wicomico County at-large and re-elected in 1966. Re-elected in 1970. Lost re-election.

=== Single-member Senate district (1975–present) ===
Years	Senator	Party	Electoral history
January 8, 1975 – January 3, 1977	Newton Steers	Republican	Redistricted from District 3-A and re-elected in 1974. Resigned.
January 4, 1977 – January 11, 1995	Howard A. Denis	Republican	Appointed to serve the remainder of Steers's term. Elected in 1978. Re-elected in 1982. Re-elected in 1986. Re-elected in 1990. Retired to run for lieutenant governor.
January 11, 1995 – January 6, 2015	Brian Frosh	Democratic	Elected in 1994. Re-elected in 1998. Re-elected in 2002. Re-elected in 2006. Re-elected in 2010. Retired to run for attorney general.
January 14, 2015 – January 18, 2023	Susan C. Lee	Democratic	Elected in 2014. Re-elected in 2018. Re-elected in 2022. Resigned.
February 27, 2023 – May 5, 2024	Ariana Kelly	Democratic	Appointed to serve the remainder of Lee's term. Resigned.
June 13, 2024 – present	Sara N. Love	Democratic	Appointed to serve the remainder of Kelly's term. Elected in 2026.
