= Teresa Saavedra Woorman =

American politician (born 1991)

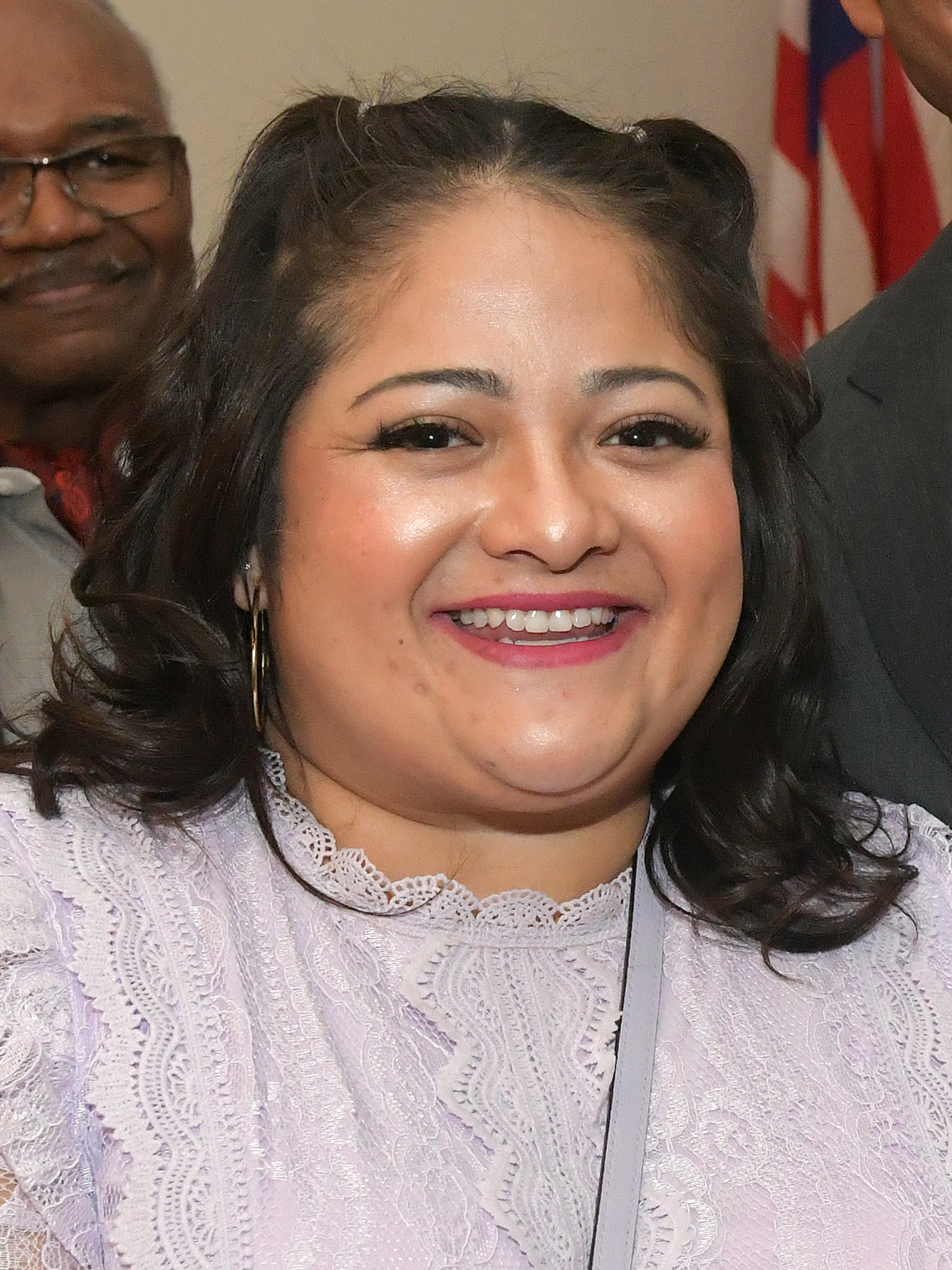
- Woorman in 2024

Member of the Maryland House of Delegates from the 16th district
- Incumbent
- Assumed office August 12, 2024 Serving with Sarah Wolek and Marc Korman
- Appointed by: Wes Moore
- Preceded by: Sara N. Love

Personal details
- Born: September 2, 1991 (age 35) Puebla, Mexico
- Citizenship: Mexico; United States
- Party: Democratic

Teresa Saavedra Woorman (born September 2, 1991) is an American politician who is a member of the Maryland House of Delegates from the 16th district.

== Early life and education ==
Woorman was born in Puebla, Mexico on September 2, 1991. Woorman and her family immigrated to Montgomery County, Maryland when she was nine years old. After graduating from Northwest High School in 2009, she attended Montgomery College, where she earned an associate's degree in international business in 2012, and the University of Maryland, College Park, where she earned a Bachelor of Arts degree in government and politics in 2015. Woorman became a U.S. citizen while attending college.

== Political career ==
Woorman worked for the Maryland General Assembly for seven years after graduating, including as chief of staff and legislative director for several of its members from 2016 to 2021 and as the campaign manager of 21st district incumbents in 2018. She was also the executive vice president of Maryland Young Democrats from 2023 to 2024, and the chair of Pro-Choice Maryland's board of directors from 2022 to 2024. Woorman ran for delegate to the 2020 Democratic National Convention, pledged to Pete Buttigieg in the primary. She attended the 2020 Democratic National Convention pledged to Joe Biden. She was a delegate to the 2024 Democratic National Convention pledged to Kamala Harris. During the 2022 Maryland elections, she served as the campaign manager for Marc Elrich's reelection campaign and as the deputy finance director for Brooke Lierman's Comptroller campaign. Since 2023, Woorman has worked as a public information officer for the Montgomery County government.

== Maryland House of Delegates ==
In April 2022, Woorman was selected to fill a vacancy on the Montgomery County Democratic Central Committee. She was then elected to this position in July 2022, and became the party's secretary in December 2022. In June 2024, following the appointment of state delegate Sara N. Love to the Maryland Senate after Ariana Kelly's resignation, Woorman applied to serve the remainder of Love's term in the Maryland House of Delegates. During interviews with the Montgomery County Democratic Central Committee (MCDCC), she told party members that she would prioritize housing affordability, ethics reforms, and health equity bills in the legislature. The MCDCC voted 14–10 to nominate Woorman on July 11, 2024. She was sworn in on August 12, 2024 and is a member of the Health and Government Operations Committee. In January 2026, Woorman was named as a deputy majority whip for the Maryland House of Delegates.

== Political positions ==
During the 2025 legislative session, Woorman introduced a bill that would allow noncitizens to serve as a personal representative to their spouse's estate. The bill was introduced after María del Carmen Castellón Luna—whose husband, Miguel Luna, was killed in the Francis Scott Key Bridge collapse—was blocked from serving as a representative to Miguel's estate. The bill passed the House of Delegates, but died in the Senate Judicial Proceedings committee.

During the 2026 legislative session, Woorman supported legislation banning counties from entering into 287(g) program agreements with U.S. Immigration and Customs Enforcement, which she said would build trust between local officers and immigrant communities in Maryland and allows immigrants to feel safer when reporting crimes.

== Personal life ==
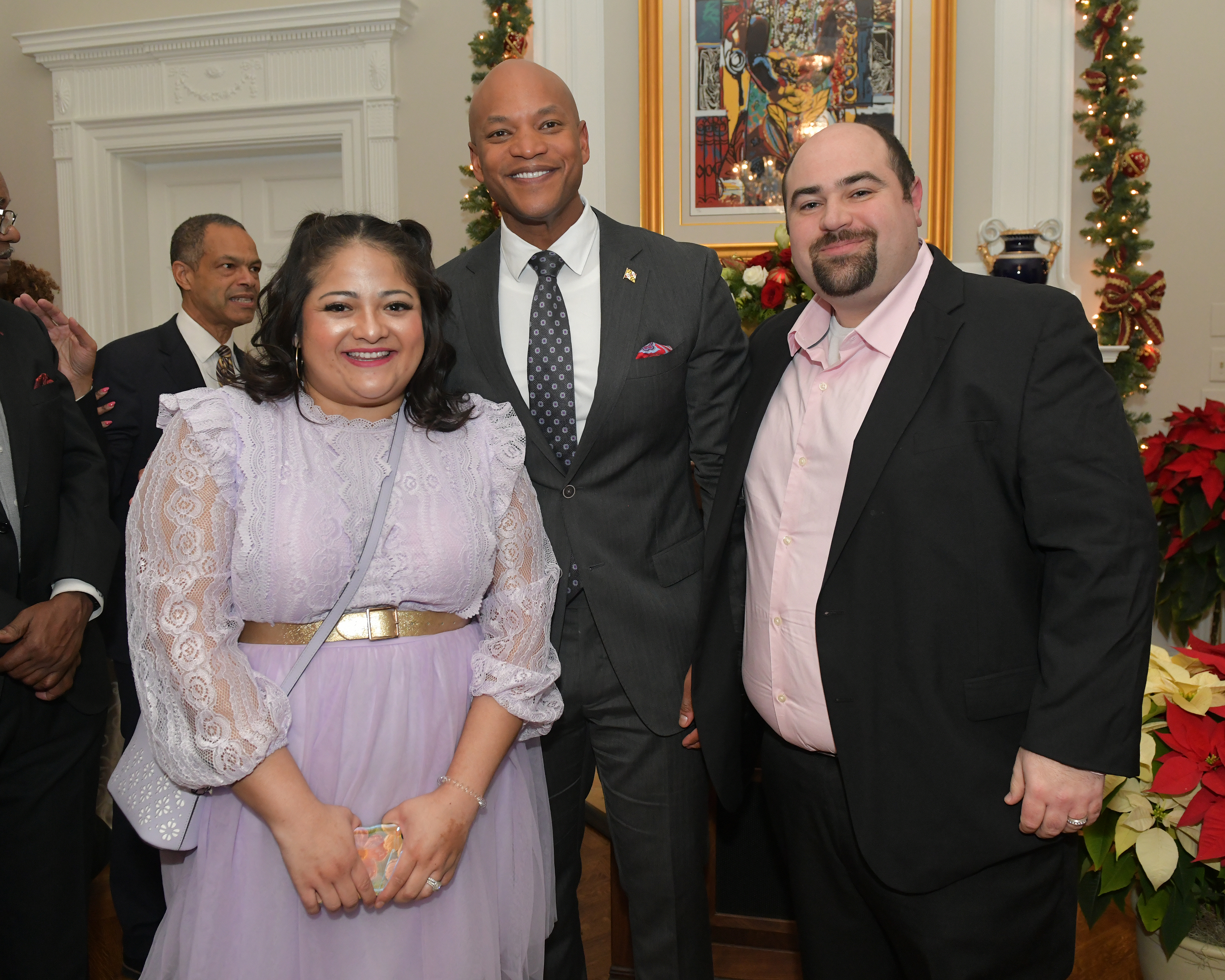
Woorman and her husband Matthew with Governor Wes Moore, December 2024

Woorman is married to her husband, Matthew, an opera singer, and they live in Bethesda, Maryland. She is a member of the LGBTQ community.

Woorman received national attention during the 2024 Democratic National Convention, one week after being sworn in to the Maryland House of Delegates. The camera panned to Woorman during Oprah Winfrey's prime time speech, immediately after Winfrey's reference to JD Vance's remarks regarding "childless cat ladies." Many watching the convention live found this humorous, comparing the broadcast's camerawork to the comedic camera pans used on The Wendy Williams Show, resulting in the moment going viral. Woorman responded to the moment graciously, confirming on social media that she currently has two cats (Snow White and Oscar), a dog (Gatsby), and no children. A few weeks after the convention in September 2024, Winfrey sent Woorman a bouquet of "over 300" roses, a basket of cat toys, a litter vacuum, and a note that said, "Thank you for rising to this moment with grace and humor".

Woorman is fluent in Spanish, English, French, and Italian.
