= Francis Brannigan =

American engineer

Francis L. Brannigan (October 13, 1918 – January 10, 2006) was a writer and teacher in the field of fire protection engineering. He died in his sleep at his home in Calverton, Maryland, United States, and was interred in Arlington National Cemetery. In his youth, he first enlisted and then was commissioned in the US Navy. While in the Navy, he was assigned to the Panama Canal Army-Navy-Pancanal lock project as chief of fire protection, and created a fire school there to train Navy crews in mass fire fighting tactics . Later, he served as Public Safety Liaison Officer for the US Atomic Energy Commission. As Professor and Director of the Fire Science program at Montgomery College, Rockville, Maryland, he designed a model Fire Science program. He was also a faculty member at the National Fire Academy and at the University of Maryland's Maryland Fire and Rescue Institute. Brannigan was elected a Fellow of the Society of Fire Protection Engineers.

Frank Brannigan was the author of Building Construction for the Fire Service which was in its third edition when he died. The fourth edition had been completed before his death and was published posthumously. Brannigan is primarily recognized for his efforts to increase firefighter safety through education on the dangers of building collapse.

When he began his career in the 1930s there was no systematic treatment of the problem of building collapse in fire. Brannigan brought together the technical and fire communities to create an integrated approach to firefighter safety. He made a strong and conscious effort in all of his writing to use plain language to explain technical concepts, in order to make it more accessible. His efforts have been rewarded in being quoted by such figures as Battalion Chief Arthur Scheuerman, FDNY (Retired) in his analysis of the collapse of the World Trade Center towers. His column in FireRescue Magazine, also titled "Building Construction" ran for many years.

In 1977 the Francis L. Brannigan Instructor of the Year Award was created in his honor. The Award recognizes contributions in Fire, EMS and Rescue training in the state of Maryland. The award is sponsored every year by the Chesapeake Society of Fire and Rescue Instructors and the Maryland Chapter of the International Society of Fire and Rescue Instructors and awarded by the Maryland State Firemen's Association.

Frank Brannigan was also credited as being one of the originators of the concept of a database that tracks firefighter "near misses" and supplements the statistics kept for firefighters killed in the line of duty. His focus for more than 75 years was the reduction of firefighter injury and death.

His son Vincent Brannigan is an attorney and a professor in the University Of Maryland Department of Fire Protection Engineering. His granddaughter Ariana Kelly is a state delegate in Maryland.

Francis L. Brannigan was inducted into the United States Navy Fire & Emergency Services Hall of Fame in August 2010.
