= Mary L. Nock =

American politician

Member of the Maryland Senate
- In office January 1955 – 1974

Member of the Maryland House of Delegates
- In office 1946–?

Personal details
- Born: Mary Layfield; September 3, 1903 Green Hill, Maryland, USA
- Died: May 20, 1987 (aged 83)
- Party: Democratic Party
- Spouse: Garland Nock (m. 1925)
- Education: Beacom Business College

Mary Layfield Nock (September 3, 1903 – May 20, 1987) was an American Democratic politician. She was one of the first women to serve on the Maryland House of Delegates. During her political career, Nock advocated for women's issues, higher education, and the use of television as an educational tool.

== Biography ==
Nock was born on September 3, 1903, in Green Hill, near Salisbury, Maryland, to parents William T. Layfield and Lulu T. Layfield. They later moved to Quantico, Maryland. She attended Beacom Business College in Salisbury and worked as a secretary after graduation. In 1920, she moved to Salisbury, shortly after attending her first political meeting, and voting for the first time. In 1925, she married Garland Nock, a construction official.

== Career ==
Nock became secretary for David J. Ward, Vice President of the Salisbury Motor Company, succeeding her aunt. In 1932, Ward was elected to the Maryland Senate, and Nock traveled with him, working for him until Ward got elected to the United States House of Representatives. Shortly after Ward arrived in Washington, D.C., she was rehired, and served as his secretary again. Ward lost his bid for re-election in 1944, Nock returned home to Wicomico County.

Nock ran in 1946 for the Maryland House of Delegates, and won the primary and later the election, becoming one of the first women in the House of Delegates. She served on the ways and means committee, and had her first bill passed three years later. She soon became known as the "Victorian legislator" for voting against a bill that allowed baseball to be played on Sundays.

In January 1955, Nock was elected to the state Senate. She was the first woman from the Eastern Shore elected to the State Senate. Serving on the Finance and the Agricultural and Natural Resources Committees, she crusaded against the State Roads Commission, trying to limit its power. She was reelected in 1958, and in 1959 introduced thirty-three bills that were signed into law. She eventually became President pro tempore of the State Senate. Her senate career ended in 1974, when she lost an election to E. Homer White Jr. by 240 votes.

In 1979, Nock wrote and published It Was a Joy and a Pleasure, a narrative of her life experiences.

She died on May 20, 1987.
