= Sarah Wolek =

American politician (born 1979)

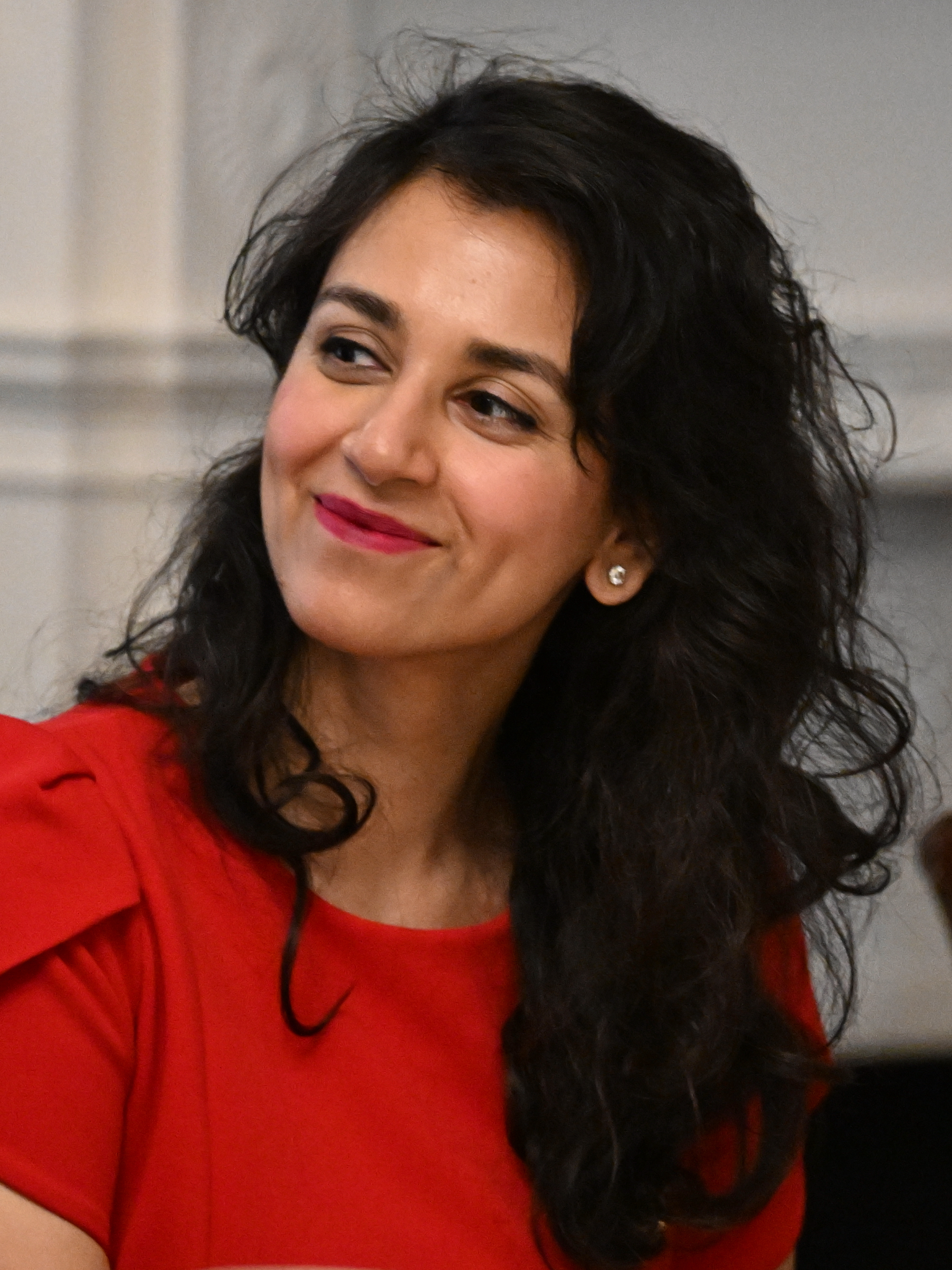
- Wolek in 2024

Member of the Maryland House of Delegates from the 16th district
- Incumbent
- Assumed office April 3, 2023 Serving with Marc Korman and Teresa Saavedra Woorman
- Appointed by: Wes Moore
- Preceded by: Ariana Kelly

Personal details
- Born: November 6, 1979 (age 46) New York City, New York, U.S.
- Party: Democratic
- Children: 3
- Education: University of Maryland, College Park (BA, BS); Columbia University (MBA); University of Chicago (MA)
- Occupation: College professor
- Website: Official website

Sarah Siddiqui Wolek (born November 6, 1979) is an American politician who is a member of the Maryland House of Delegates from District 16.

== Early life and education ==
Wolek was born in New York City and spent part of her childhood in Pakistan. She grew up in Montgomery County, Maryland after her family moved so that her younger sibling could attend special education programs, and graduated from Thomas S. Wootton High School. Wolek earned her Bachelor of Arts degree in economics and Bachelor of Science in information technology from the University of Maryland, College Park (UMD), and later graduated from Columbia University with a Master of Business Administration degree and from the University of Chicago with a Master of Arts degree in public policy.

== Career ==
Wolek worked for the federal government after graduating until shortly after the 2016 presidential election, working in positions including the United States Mission to the United Nations, the United States Department of Housing and Urban Development, the Office of Management and Budget, and the United States Department of the Treasury. In 2017, Wolek returned to UMD to teach classes and workshops focusing on purpose and character, community, relationships, nature, prosperity, and wellness.

From 2018 to 2022, Wolek served as a member of the Montgomery County Democratic Central Committee from District 16. In November 2018, she was named as a member of Montgomery County Executive-elect Marc Elrich's transition team. In December 2018, Wolek graduated from Emerge Maryland, a group dedicated to training and electing Democratic women to office.

In March 2023, Wolek was one of eighteen candidates to apply to fill a vacancy in the Maryland House of Delegates left by the appointment of then-delegate Ariana Kelly to the Maryland Senate. On March 21, the Montgomery County Democratic Central Committee voted 16–8 to nominate her to serve the rest of Kelly's term.

== In the legislature ==
Wolek was sworn into the Maryland House of Delegates on April 3, 2023. She is a member of the House Appropriations Committee. Wolek is the first Muslim woman to serve in the Maryland General Assembly. In February 2026, Wolek, alongside state delegates Sean Stinnett and Caylin Young, established the Maryland Muslim Caucus.

== Personal life ==
Wolek is married to her husband, a Catholic Polish immigrant. Together, they live in Bethesda, Maryland and have three children.

== Electoral history ==
Montgomery County Democratic Central Committee District 16 election, 2018
Party	Candidate	Votes	%
Democratic	Sarah Wolek	7,951	67.8
Democratic	Ann Racuya-Robbins	3,781	32.2
