= William Frick =

American politician

Bill Frick
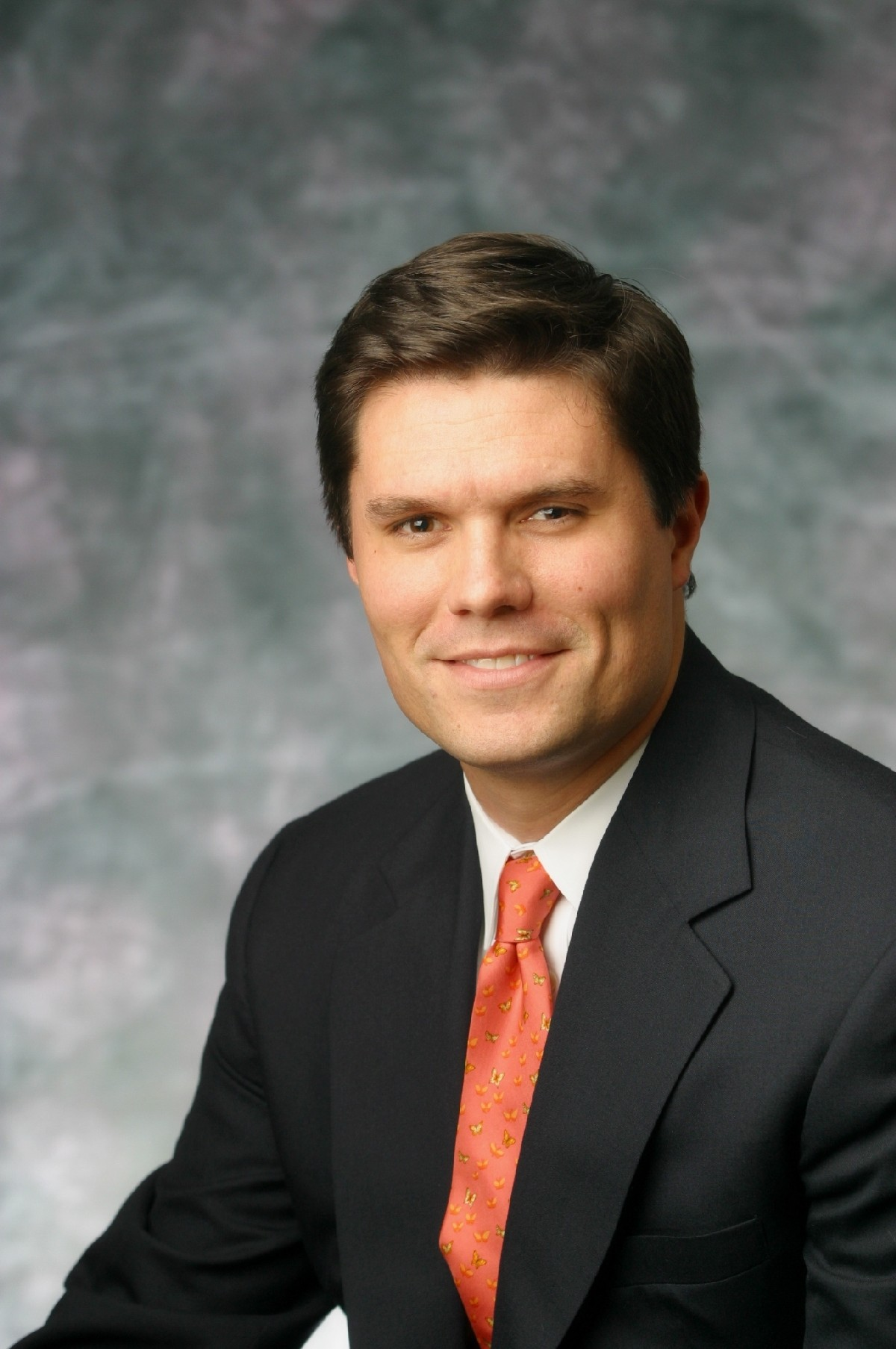

Majority Leader of the Maryland House of Delegates
- In office January 20, 2017 – January 9, 2019
- Preceded by: Anne Kaiser
- Succeeded by: Kathleen Dumais

Member of the Maryland House of Delegates from the 16th district
- In office October 2, 2007 – January 9, 2019
- Preceded by: Marilyn R. Goldwater
- Succeeded by: Sara N. Love

Personal details
- Born: Charles William Frick; December 30, 1974 (age 51) Silver Spring, Maryland, U.S.
- Party: Democratic
- Education: Northwestern University (BA); Harvard University (JD)

Charles William 'Bill' Frick (born December 30, 1974) is an American politician from Maryland and a member of the Democratic Party. From 2007 to 2018, he was a member of the Maryland House of Delegates from District 16, which includes parts of Bethesda, Friendship Heights, and Somerset.

== Background ==
Frick was born in Silver Spring, Maryland and attended Bethesda-Chevy Chase High School. He later attended Northwestern University in Evanston, IL, earning a B.A. in political science & history, and in 2000 graduated from Harvard Law School with his Juris Doctor degree. Prior to his appointment to the House of Delegates, Frick served in volunteer positions in the local Democratic Party, including as Vice President of the District 16 Democratic Club and a member of the Montgomery County Young Democrats, and also served as chair of Montgomery County's Pedestrian Advisory Committee. He is married and has two children.

== Political career ==
In 2007, Frick was appointed to the Maryland House of Delegates representing District 16 following the retirement of former Delegate Marilyn R. Goldwater. Frick was a dark horse candidate in the appointment process, competing with Don Mooers, a party activist and former candidate for congress, and Reggie Oldak, who had run in the district in 2006. Despite this competition and his being relatively unknown, Frick was chosen by the central committee on the first ballot. A local political blog writing of the appointment later asked, "Who the Frick is Bill?"

After finishing out Del. Goldwater's term, Frick ran for election for the first time in 2010. In a wild 13-way primary for three nominations, Frick won the second-most votes, joining a Democratic slate with Susan Lee and Ariana Kelly. The Democrats won all three seats easily in the general election that November.

In 2014, Frick began a campaign for Attorney General of Maryland, but withdrew from the race and sought re-election as a Delegate. He was elected in November by a comfortable margin.

In the House of Delegates, Frick was a subcommittee chairman on the Ways and Means Committee and served as the chamber’s parliamentarian. In January 2017, he was appointed majority leader.

Frick explored a Congressional campaign for 2018 but later announced that he would run for County Executive in Montgomery County. He finished sixth in a crowded Democratic primary in June 2018.

== Legal career ==
Bill Frick joined the Maryland Bar and the District of Columbia Bar in 2001. He was Counsel at the law firm of Akin Gump Strauss Hauer & Feld LLP, specializing in civil, criminal, and administrative litigation. In January 2019, he joined the law firm of Cuneo Gilbert & LaDuca LLP. In December 2021 he set up his own lobbying firm, “The Frick Firm.”

Maryland House of Delegates
Preceded by Anne Kaiser	Majority Leader of the Maryland House of Delegates; 2017–2019	Succeeded by Kathleen Dumais
