= Ariana Kelly =

American politician (born 1976)

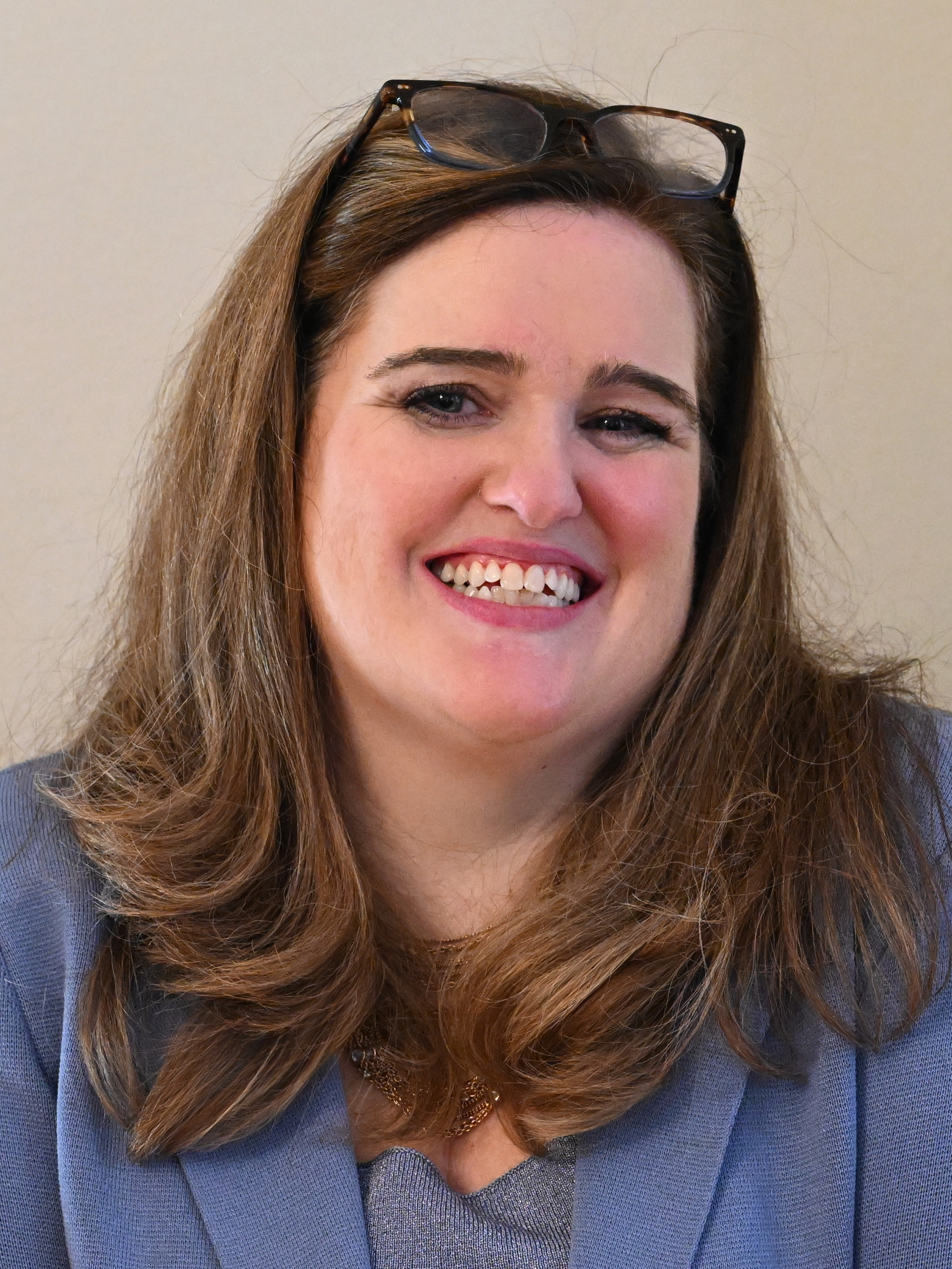
- Kelly in 2026

Member of the Maryland Senate from the 16th district
- In office February 27, 2023 – May 5, 2024
- Appointed by: Wes Moore
- Preceded by: Susan C. Lee
- Succeeded by: Sara N. Love

Member of the Maryland House of Delegates from the 16th district
- In office January 12, 2011 – February 27, 2023
- Preceded by: Karen Britto
- Succeeded by: Sarah Wolek

Personal details
- Born: December 7, 1976 (age 49) Bethesda, Maryland, U.S.
- Party: Democratic
- Spouses: Barak Sanford (m. 1999; div. 2012) Stephen Taylor (m. 2022)
- Children: 4
- Education: University of Wisconsin-Madison (BA)

Ariana Brannigan Kelly (born December 7, 1976) is an American politician who is the executive director of the Maryland Commission for Women. She was a member of the Maryland Senate from District 16, which is located in Montgomery County, from 2023 to 2024. A member of the Democratic Party, she previously represented the same district in the Maryland House of Delegates from 2011 to 2023.

== Early life and education ==
Kelly was born in Bethesda, Maryland. She is the granddaughter of Maryland fire safety pioneer Francis Brannigan. Kelly graduated from Walter Johnson High School, and later attended the University of Wisconsin-Madison, where in 2002 she earned a Bachelor of Arts degree in history.

After graduating, Kelly worked as a national judicial education program associate for the National Organization for Women Legal Defense and Education Fund. She also worked as a producer for PBS' To The Contrary, a weekly news program, from 2002 to 2005, before becoming the executive director of NARAL Pro-Choice Maryland. Kelly worked as the national campaign director for MomsRising.org from 2009 to 2011.

== In the legislature ==
Kelly was sworn into the Maryland House of Delegates on January 12, 2011. She was a member of the Health and Government Operations Committee, including as its vice chair from 2022 to 2023, during her entire tenure and served as deputy majority whip from 2016 to 2023. Kelly also served as the president of the Women Legislators of Maryland caucus from 2017 to 2018, and as the House chair of the Joint Committee on Children, Youth, and Families from 2016 to 2022.

In December 2022, Governor-elect Wes Moore nominated state senator Susan C. Lee to serve as the Maryland Secretary of State. Kelly filed to fill the vacancy left by Lee in the Maryland Senate in January 2023. During the Senate nomination process, it was alleged by Scott Webber, who was also seeking the nomination, that Kelly called Webber and harassed him for submitting his nomination for the appointment; Kelly denied the allegations, calling her call with Webber a courtesy call and adding that she's made similar calls in multiple other races, and the Montgomery County Central Committee Chair indicated that the allegations were outside their purview for addressing. Kelly won the nomination by a vote of 24–0 with one abstention. She was sworn in on February 27, 2023, and served on the Judicial Proceedings Committee during her entire tenure.

On March 20, 2024, Governor Moore appointed Kelly to serve as the executive director of the Maryland Commission for Women. She resigned from the legislature following the 2024 legislative session on May 5, 2024, and assumed her new role on May 6, 2024.

== Political positions ==
=== Abortion ===
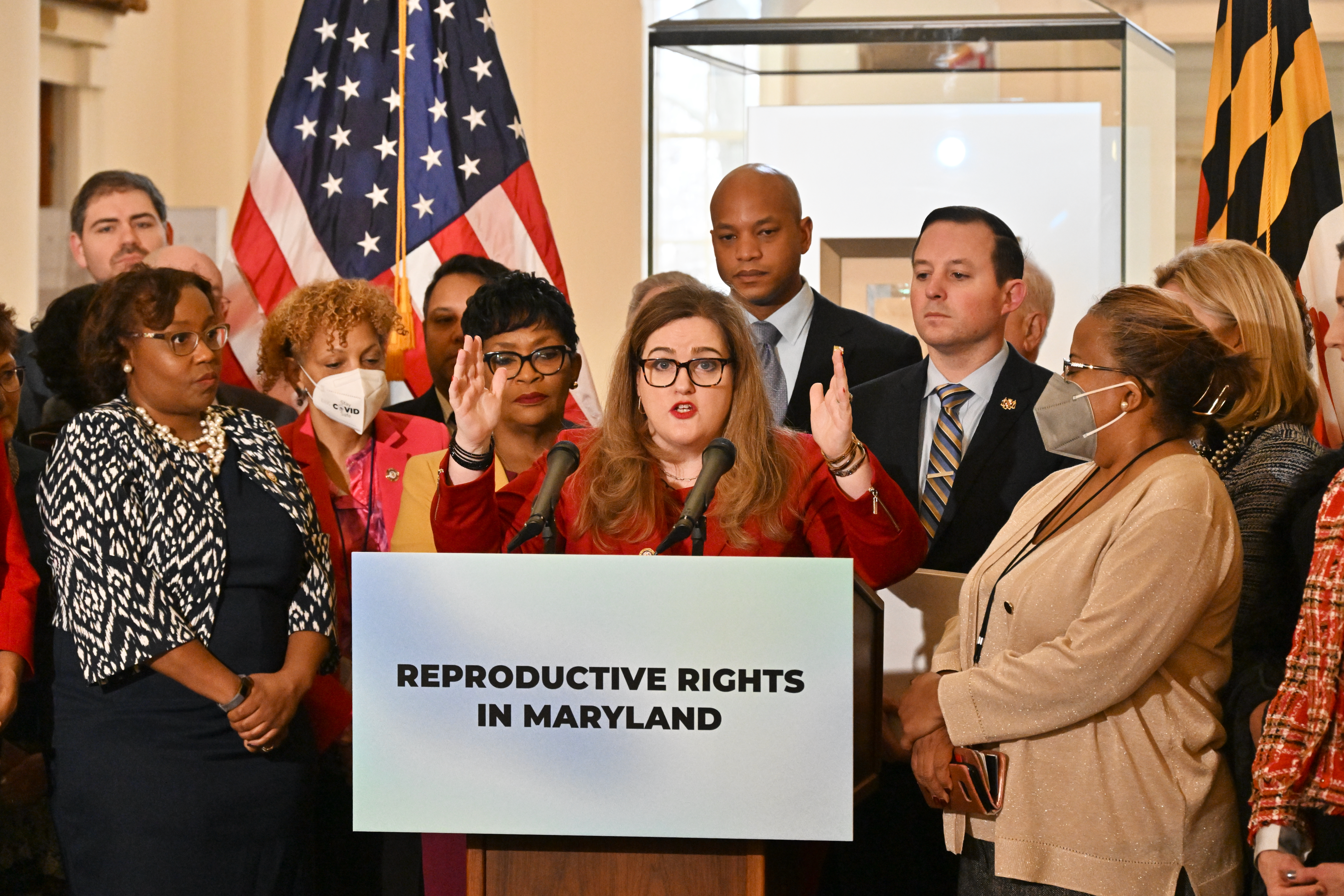
Kelly speaks at a press conference on reproductive rights, 2023

Maryland Matters has described Kelly as a "leading abortion rights supporter in the legislature". In 2019, NARAL Pro-Choice Maryland, which supports abortion, gave Kelly a 100% score. Maryland Right to Life, which opposes abortion, gave Kelly a 6% score during her third term in the Maryland House of Delegates. Kelly supported efforts led by House of Delegates Speakers Michael E. Busch and Adrienne A. Jones to codify the right to abortion access in the Maryland State Constitution, and said in September 2021 that the "time is right for the legislature to pass more progressive policies" on abortion following the passage of the Texas Heartbeat Act, which banned abortions in Texas after the detection of embryonic or fetal cardiac activity.

During the 2016 legislative session, Kelly introduced the Contraceptive Equity Act, a bill that would require insurance companies to cover over-the-counter emergency contraceptives at no extra cost. The bill passed and was signed into law by Governor Larry Hogan in May 2016.

In January 2019, Kelly was one of nine Maryland lawmakers to add their names to a manifesto signed by 326 state legislators to reaffirm their commitment to protecting abortion rights.

During the 2022 legislative session, Kelly introduced a package of bills to ensure abortion access and affordability in Maryland, including the Abortion Care Access to Insurance Act and the Abortion Care Access Act. The Abortion Care Access Act was passed by the Maryland General Assembly and vetoed by Governor Larry Hogan, but it became law after the Maryland General Assembly overrode Hogan's veto. In May 2022, following the leak of a draft majority opinion for the Supreme Court case Dobbs v. Jackson Women's Health Organization, Kelly joined 82 other legislators in signing a letter pushing Hogan to release $3.5 million in funding to support the implementation of the Abortion Care Access Act.

In June 2022, following the Supreme Court's ruling in Dobbs, Kelly said that the end of Roe v. Wade made strong laws on the state level "even more necessary".

During the 2023 legislative session, Kelly introduced legislation that would require public colleges to have a plan for student access to birth control, including contraception and abortion pills.

=== Israel ===
In November 2023, Kelly and eight other state senators signed a joint letter that threatened to defund immigrants rights group CASA de Maryland because it had called for an immediate ceasefire in the Gaza war and condemned the "utilization of US tax dollars to promote the ongoing violence."

=== Paid family leave ===
During the 2016 and 2020 legislative sessions, Kelly introduced legislation to provide Maryland workers with up to 12 weeks of paid family leave, funded by a payroll tax shared equally by the worker and employer. In 2022, she introduced a bill that would provide paid family leave to all part- and full-time employees who have worked 680 hours in the past year.

=== Social issues ===
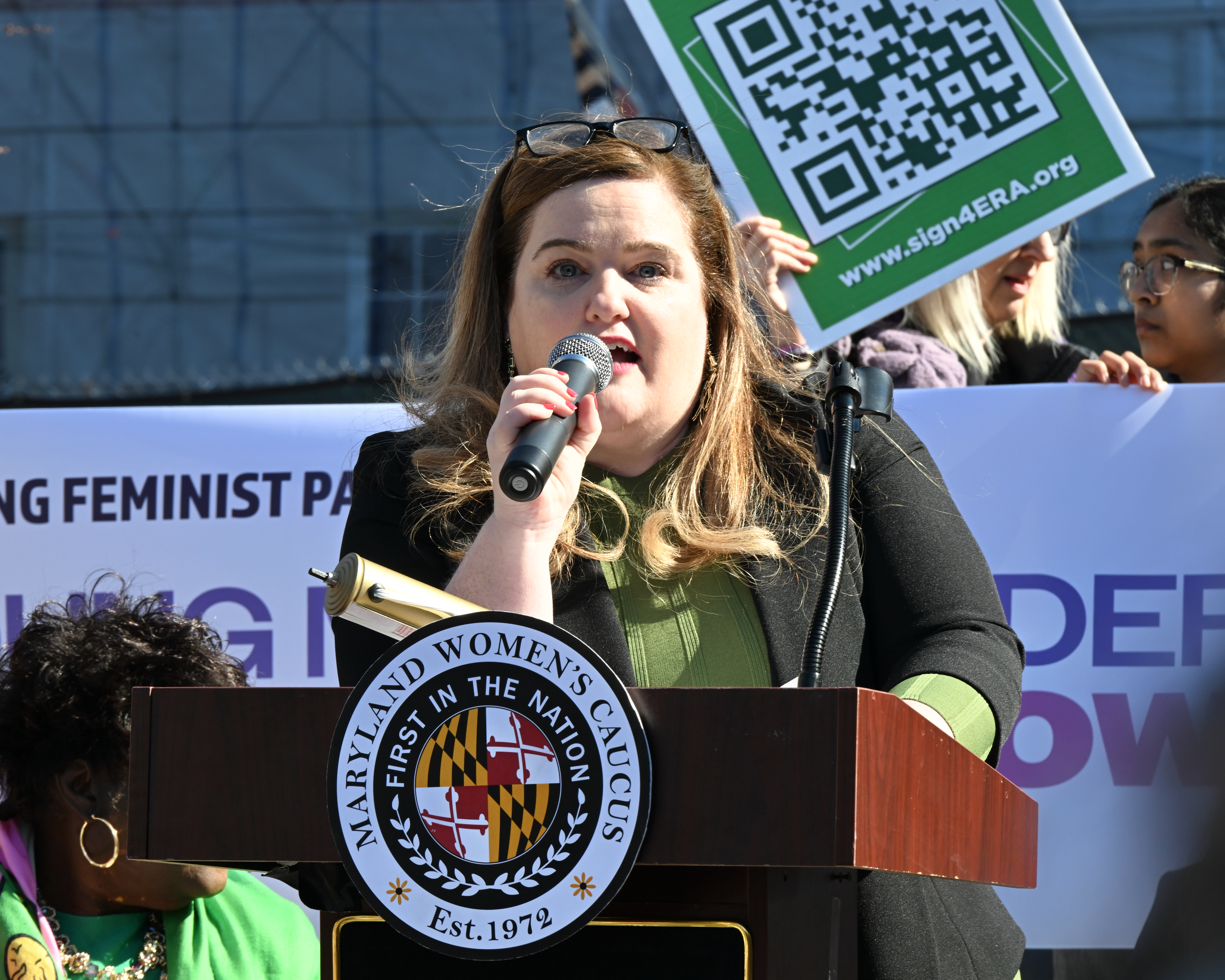
Kelly speaks at an Equal Rights Amendment rally, 2024

In February 2018, Kelly, then the president of the Women's Caucus of Maryland, released a set of policy recommendations on preventing sexual harassment in the Maryland General Assembly. These recommendations were accompanied by a report detailing anonymous accounts of sexual harassment in the Maryland General Assembly. Kelly also introduced a bill aimed at implementing these policy recommendations, which was passed and signed into law by Governor Larry Hogan.

During the 2018 legislative session, Kelly introduced a bill that would include the topic of "consent" in sex education classes. The bill passed and became law.

In September 2018, after Cheryl Glenn was elected to lead the Baltimore City Delegation, Kelly accused Glenn of blocking her efforts to assist one of Curt Anderson's alleged sexual misconduct victims and of denigrating other Anderson accusers. Glenn did not comment on these accusations.

=== Taxes ===
In 2013, Kelly voted in favor of a bill that would raise gas taxes in Maryland to fund the state's various mass transit projects.

During the 2019 legislative session, Kelly introduced a bill to expand eligibility requirements for the state's child care tax credits. The bill passed and was signed into law by Governor Larry Hogan.

== Personal life ==
Kelly has two children and two step-children. She was married to Barak Sanford from 1999 to November 2012, and later married Stephen Taylor, the owner of Family Back & Neck Care in Montgomery Village, Maryland, in 2022. Together, they live in Bethesda, Maryland.

In July 2015, Kelly was charged with indecent exposure and trespassing in an incident related to a domestic dispute. According the police report, Kelly was dropping her two children off at her ex-husband's house when she learned that his fianceé was in the residence at the time. She then exposed her breasts in his direction, which he had captured on his cellphone camera. Kelly later called the dispute that led to her arrest a "domestic quabble" rather than a criminal manner. Her charges were dropped later that month, with a spokesperson for Montgomery County State's Attorney John McCarthy saying that the incident was "a matter better suited for family court" and that the indecent exposure charges were incorrectly applied.
