= 1994 Maryland Senate election =

- November 8, 1994

All 47 seats of the Maryland Senate 24 seats needed for a majority
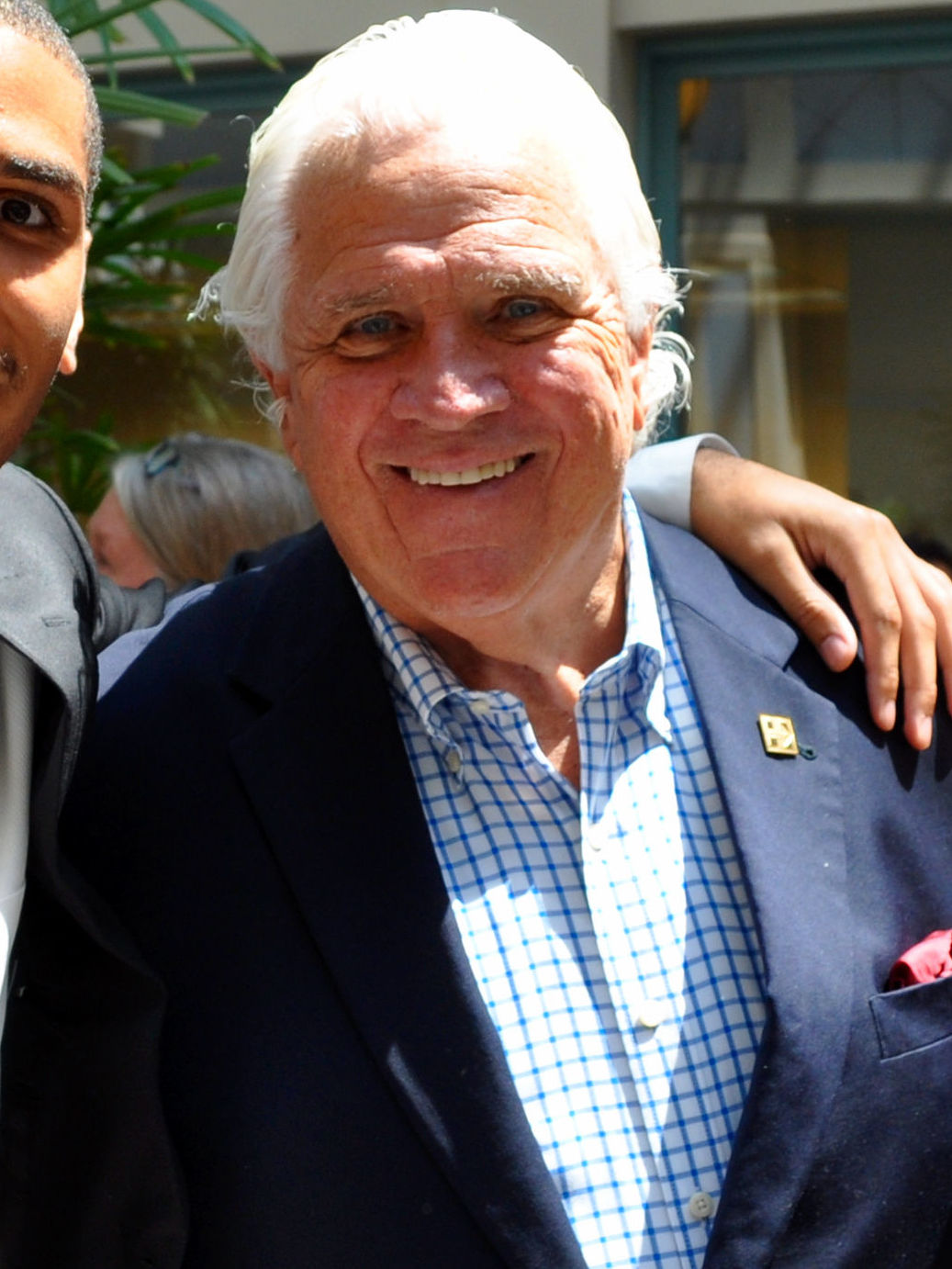

	Majority party	Minority party
Leader	Mike Miller	John A. Cade
Party	Democratic	Republican
Leader since	January 21, 1987	1984
Leader's seat	27th district	9th district
Last election	38	9
Seats won	32	15
Seat change	▼6	▲6
President before election
Mike Miller
Democratic
President
Mike Miller
Democratic

The 1994 Maryland Senate election were held on November 8, 1994, to elect senators in all 47 districts of the Maryland Senate. Members were elected in single-member constituencies to four-year terms. These elections were held concurrently with various federal and state elections, including for Governor of Maryland.

Republicans picked up six seats from the Democrats by tying themselves to the tax-cutting debate surrounding the gubernatorial election between Parris Glendening and Ellen Sauerbrey. This strategy was especially effective in Montgomery County, where Republicans campaigned on the county only getting 52 cents for every dollar in tax revenue it contributed to the state. The elections were marked by the legislature's highest turnover rate since 1974, which gave Republicans their largest legislative gains since the 1950s.

== Summary ==
=== Closest races ===
Seats where the margin of victory was under 10%:

1. State Senate district 12, 2.59%
2. State Senate district 30, 2.81%
3. State Senate district 32, 3.57% (gain)
4. State Senate district 4, 4.85% (gain)
5. State Senate district 13, 6.32% (gain)
6. State Senate district 39, 7.20% (gain)
7. State Senate district 6, 8.50%
8. State Senate district 34, 8.62% (gain)
9. State Senate district 14, 9.48%
10. State Senate district 37, 9.80% (gain)
11. State Senate district 15, 9.91% (gain)

== Retiring incumbents ==
=== Democrats ===
1. District 4: Charles H. Smelser retired.
2. District 17: Mary H. Boergers retired to run for governor of Maryland.
3. District 19: Idamae Garrott retired.
4. District 25: Beatrice P. Tignor retired to run for Prince George's County Executive.
5. District 28: James C. Simpson retired to run for lieutenant governor of Maryland alongside Lieutenant Governor Melvin Steinberg.
6. District 29: Bernie Fowler retired to run for run for lieutenant governor of Maryland alongside state senator American Joe Miedusiewski.
7. District 30: Gerald W. Winegrad retired.
8. District 37: Frederick Malkus retired.
9. District 44: Julian L. Lapides retired.
10. District 45: Nathan Irby retired to run for president of the Baltimore City Council.
11. District 46: American Joe Miedusiewski retired to run for governor of Maryland.

=== Republicans ===
1. District 16: Howard A. Denis retired to run for lieutenant governor of Maryland alongside U.S. Representative Helen Delich Bentley.

== Incumbents defeated ==
=== In primary elections ===
==== Democrats ====
1. District 11: Janice Piccinini lost a redistricting race to Paula Hollinger.
2. District 12: Nancy L. Murphy lost renomination to Edward J. Kasemeyer.
3. District 13: Thomas M. Yeager lost renomination to Virginia M. Thomas.
4. District 18: Patricia R. Sher lost renomination to Chris Van Hollen.

=== In general elections ===
==== Democrats ====
1. District 15: Laurence Levitan lost to Jean Roesser.
2. District 32: Michael J. Wagner lost to C. Edward Middlebrooks.
3. District 34: Habern W. Freeman lost to David R. Craig.

== Detailed results ==
All election results are from the Maryland State Board of Elections.

=== District 1 ===
Maryland Senate District 1 election
Party	Candidate	Votes	%
Republican	John J. Hafer (incumbent)	20,496	71.4
Democratic	Edward A. Malloy Jr.	8,209	28.6
Republican hold			

=== District 2 ===
Maryland Senate District 2 election
Party	Candidate	Votes	%
Republican	Donald F. Munson (incumbent)	20,242	81.7
Democratic	Laura J. Wright	4,535	18.3
Republican hold			

=== District 3 ===
Maryland Senate District 3 election
Party	Candidate	Votes	%
Republican	John W. Derr	20,057	68.9
Democratic	Charles R. Luttrell	9,034	31.1
Republican hold			

=== District 4 ===
Maryland Senate District 4 election
Party	Candidate	Votes	%
Republican	Timothy R. Ferguson	15,975	52.4
Democratic	George H. Littrell Jr.	14,496	47.6
Republican gain from Democratic			

=== District 5 ===
Maryland Senate District 5 election
Party	Candidate	Votes	%
Republican	Larry E. Haines (incumbent)	22,599	63.7
Democratic	Cynthia Huggins Cummings	12,857	36.3
Republican hold			

=== District 6 ===
Maryland Senate District 6 election
Party	Candidate	Votes	%
Democratic	Michael J. Collins (incumbent)	12,463	54.2
Republican	Alfred E. Clasing Jr.	10,511	45.8
Democratic hold			

=== District 7 ===
Maryland Senate District 7 election
Party	Candidate	Votes	%
Democratic	Norman R. Stone Jr. (incumbent)	16,853	65.9
Republican	Russell Mirabile	8,710	34.1
Democratic hold			

=== District 8 ===
Maryland Senate District 8 election
Party	Candidate	Votes	%
Democratic	Thomas L. Bromwell (incumbent)	17,493	55.5
Republican	John J. Bishop	14,052	44.5
Democratic hold			

=== District 9 ===
Maryland Senate District 9 election
Party	Candidate	Votes	%
Republican	F. Vernon Boozer (incumbent)	27,143	100.0
Republican hold			

=== District 10 ===
Maryland Senate District 10 election
Party	Candidate	Votes	%
Democratic	Delores G. Kelley	18,323	78.9
Republican	Jerome Goodman	4,900	21.1
Democratic hold			

=== District 11 ===
Maryland Senate District 11 election
Party	Candidate	Votes	%
Democratic	Paula Hollinger	24,226	63.2
Republican	Richard Manski	14,082	36.8
Democratic hold			

=== District 12 ===
Maryland Senate District 12 election
Party	Candidate	Votes	%
Democratic	Edward J. Kasemeyer	16,121	51.3
Republican	David P. Maier	15,306	48.7
Democratic hold			

=== District 13 ===
Maryland Senate District 13 election
Party	Candidate	Votes	%
Republican	Martin G. Madden	16,615	53.2
Democratic	Virginia M. Thomas	14,640	46.8
Republican gain from Democratic			

=== District 14 ===
Maryland Senate District 14 election
Party	Candidate	Votes	%
Republican	Christopher J. McCabe (incumbent)	23,219	54.7
Democratic	James P. Mundy	19,199	45.3
Republican hold			

=== District 15 ===
Maryland Senate District 15 election
Party	Candidate	Votes	%
Republican	Jean Roesser	20,272	55.0
Democratic	Laurence Levitan (incumbent)	16,616	45.0
Republican gain from Democratic			

=== District 16 ===
Maryland Senate District 16 election
Party	Candidate	Votes	%
Democratic	Brian Frosh	25,292	63.8
Republican	Daniel J. Cronin	14,377	36.2
Democratic gain from Republican			

=== District 17 ===
Maryland Senate District 17 election
Party	Candidate	Votes	%
Democratic	Jennie M. Forehand	19,194	97.8
Democratic	Lih Y. Young	430	2.2
Democratic hold			

=== District 18 ===
Maryland Senate District 18 election
Party	Candidate	Votes	%
Democratic	Chris Van Hollen	21,669	67.8
Republican	Albert E. Bullock	10,231	32.0
Independent	Mark Merritt Spradley	66	0.2
Democratic hold			

=== District 19 ===
Maryland Senate District 19 election
Party	Candidate	Votes	%
Democratic	Leonard H. Teitelbaum	22,630	64.3
Republican	Lynn Siguenza	12,569	35.7
Democratic hold			

=== District 20 ===
Maryland Senate District 20 election
Party	Candidate	Votes	%
Democratic	Ida G. Ruben (incumbent)	18,353	70.0
Republican	John C. Leahy	7,848	30.0
Democratic hold			

=== District 21 ===
Maryland Senate District 21 election
Party	Candidate	Votes	%
Democratic	Arthur Dorman (incumbent)	12,801	64.9
Republican	Herman B. Bouma	6,932	35.1
Democratic hold			

=== District 22 ===
Maryland Senate District 22 election
Party	Candidate	Votes	%
Democratic	Paul G. Pinsky (incumbent)	11,713	63.1
Republican	John A. Schaffer	6,849	36.9
Democratic hold			

=== District 23 ===
Maryland Senate District 23 election
Party	Candidate	Votes	%
Democratic	Leo E. Green (incumbent)	23,606	100.0
Democratic hold			

=== District 24 ===
Maryland Senate District 24 election
Party	Candidate	Votes	%
Democratic	Decatur "Bucky" Trotter (incumbent)	15,725	100.0
Democratic hold			

=== District 25 ===
Maryland Senate District 25 election
Party	Candidate	Votes	%
Democratic	Ulysses Currie	16,019	100.0
Democratic hold			

=== District 26 ===
Maryland Senate District 26 election
Party	Candidate	Votes	%
Democratic	Gloria G. Lawlah (incumbent)	17,590	76.8
Republican	Mary Bell G. Shepherd	5,321	23.2
Democratic hold			

=== District 27 ===
Maryland Senate District 27 election
Party	Candidate	Votes	%
Democratic	Thomas V. Miller Jr. (incumbent)	21,699	68.1
Republican	Joan Austin	10,146	31.9
Democratic hold			

=== District 28 ===
Maryland Senate District 28 election
Party	Candidate	Votes	%
Democratic	Thomas M. Middleton	14,195	56.8
Republican	James Easter	10,804	43.2
Democratic hold			

=== District 29 ===
Maryland Senate District 29 election
Party	Candidate	Votes	%
Democratic	Roy Dyson	16,660	56.8
Republican	James M. McKay	12,678	43.2
Democratic hold			

=== District 30 ===
Maryland Senate District 30 election
Party	Candidate	Votes	%
Democratic	John Astle	18,631	51.4
Republican	Mary McNally Rose	17,613	48.6
Democratic hold			

=== District 31 ===
Maryland Senate District 31 election
Party	Candidate	Votes	%
Democratic	Philip C. Jimeno (incumbent)	19,518	59.3
Republican	Nancy M. Schrum	13,402	40.7
Democratic hold			

=== District 32 ===
Maryland Senate District 32 election
Party	Candidate	Votes	%
Republican	C. Edward Middlebrooks	14,055	51.8
Democratic	Michael J. Wagner (incumbent)	13,086	48.2
Republican gain from Democratic			

=== District 33 ===
Maryland Senate District 33 election
Party	Candidate	Votes	%
Republican	John A. Cade (incumbent)	27,817	100.0
Republican hold			

=== District 34 ===
Maryland Senate District 34 election
Party	Candidate	Votes	%
Republican	David R. Craig	17,444	54.3
Democratic	Habern W. Freeman (incumbent)	14,676	45.7
Republican gain from Democratic			

=== District 35 ===
Maryland Senate District 35 election
Party	Candidate	Votes	%
Democratic	William H. Amoss (incumbent)	19,993	54.4
Republican	Gwendalynne G. Corkran	13,245	36.1
Independent	Catharine Wilson	3,485	9.5
Democratic hold			

=== District 36 ===
Maryland Senate District 36 election
Party	Candidate	Votes	%
Democratic	Walter M. Baker (incumbent)	17,981	98.3
Democratic	Janice L. Graham	302	1.7
Democratic hold			

=== District 37 ===
Maryland Senate District 37 election
Party	Candidate	Votes	%
Republican	Richard F. Colburn	16,224	54.9
Democratic	Samuel Q. Johnson III	13,327	45.1
Republican gain from Democratic			

=== District 38 ===
Maryland Senate District 38 election
Party	Candidate	Votes	%
Republican	J. Lowell Stoltzfus (incumbent)	21,783	66.9
Democratic	Dennis C. Donaldson	10,794	33.1
Republican hold			

=== District 39 ===
Maryland Senate District 39 election
Party	Candidate	Votes	%
Republican	Patrick J. Hogan	15,101	53.6
Democratic	Gene W. Counihan	13,072	46.4
Republican gain from Democratic			

=== District 40 ===
Maryland Senate District 40 election
Party	Candidate	Votes	%
Democratic	Ralph M. Hughes (incumbent)	15,133	94.5
Republican	Melvin Stubbs	882	5.5
Democratic hold			

=== District 41 ===
Maryland Senate District 41 election
Party	Candidate	Votes	%
Democratic	Clarence W. Blount (incumbent)	15,902	100.0
Democratic hold			

=== District 42 ===
Maryland Senate District 42 election
Party	Candidate	Votes	%
Democratic	Barbara A. Hoffman (incumbent)	22,251	75.1
Republican	J. Gary Lee	7,389	24.9
Democratic hold			

=== District 43 ===
Maryland Senate District 43 election
Party	Candidate	Votes	%
Democratic	John A. Pica Jr. (incumbent)	18,374	100.0
Democratic hold			

=== District 44 ===
Maryland Senate District 44 election
Party	Candidate	Votes	%
Democratic	Larry Young (incumbent)	10,460	100.0
Democratic hold			

=== District 45 ===
Maryland Senate District 45 election
Party	Candidate	Votes	%
Democratic	Nathaniel J. McFadden	12,568	100.0
Democratic hold			

=== District 46 ===
Maryland Senate District 46 election
Party	Candidate	Votes	%
Democratic	Perry Sfikas	13,578	100.0
Democratic hold			

=== District 47 ===
Maryland Senate District 47 election
Party	Candidate	Votes	%
Democratic	George W. Della Jr. (incumbent)	12,575	61.8
Republican	John A. Hoffman	7,764	38.2
Democratic hold			
