= 1990 Maryland Senate election =

- November 6, 1990

All 47 seats of the Maryland Senate 24 seats needed for a majority
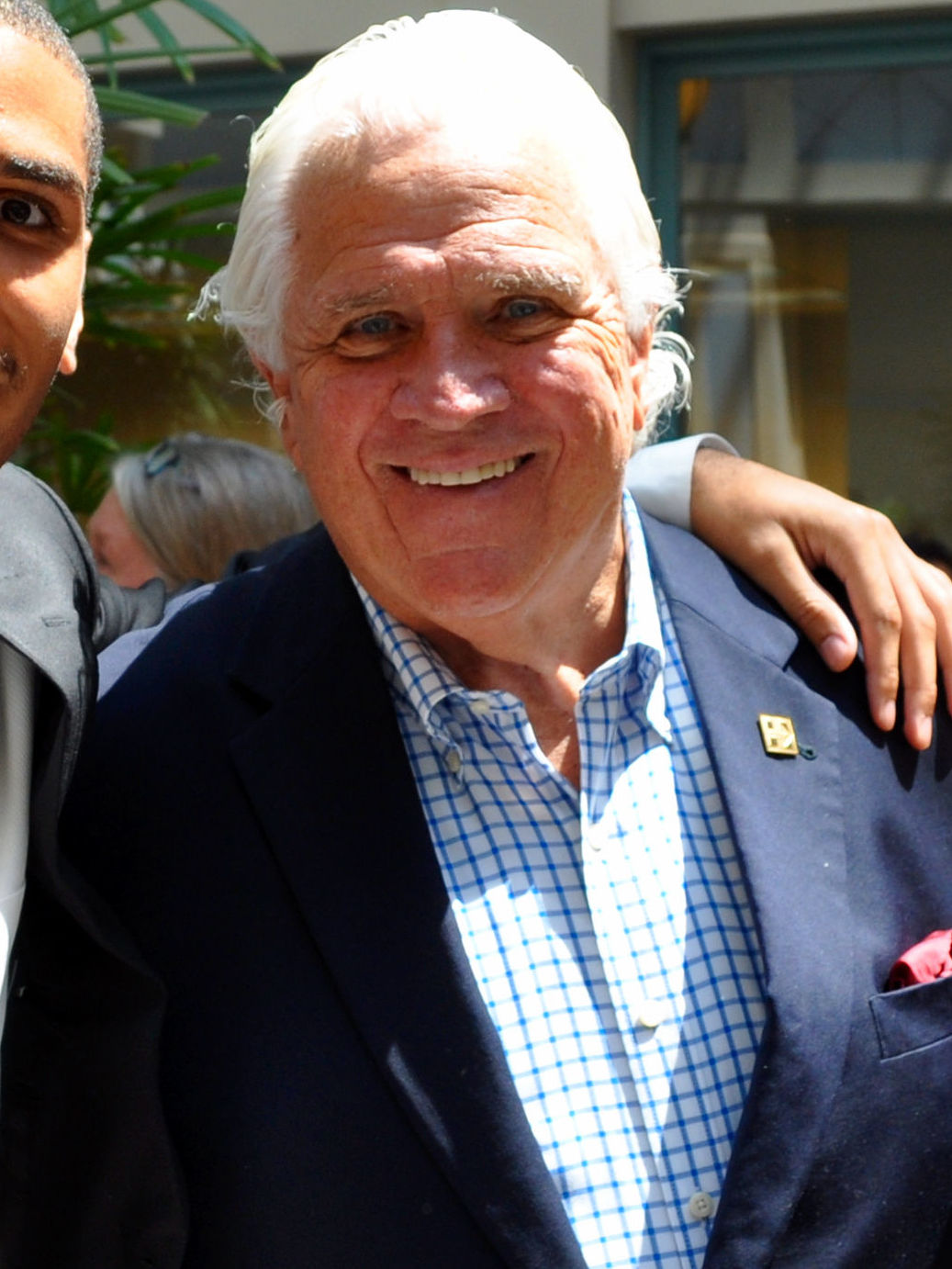

	Majority party	Minority party
Leader	Mike Miller	John A. Cade
Party	Democratic	Republican
Leader since	January 21, 1987	1984
Leader's seat	27th district	9th district
Last election	40	7
Seats won	38	9
Seat change	▼2	▲2
President before election
Mike Miller
Democratic
President
Mike Miller
Democratic

The 1990 Maryland Senate election were held on November 6, 1990, to elect senators in all 47 districts of the Maryland Senate. Members were elected in single-member constituencies to four-year terms. These elections were held concurrently with various federal and state elections, including for Governor of Maryland.

== Summary ==
=== Closest races ===
Seats where the margin of victory was under 10%:

1. State Senate district 14, 1.34% (gain)
2. State Senate district 5, 6.59%
3. State Senate district 8, 8.36%
4. State Senate district 43, 8.41%

== Retiring incumbents ==
=== Democrats ===
1. District 34: Catherine Riley retired.

=== Republicans ===
1. District 1: John N. Bambacus retired.

== Incumbents defeated ==
=== In primary elections ===
==== Democrats ====
1. District 10: Francis X. Kelly lost renomination to Janice Piccinini.
2. District 17: S. Frank Shore lost renomination to Mary H. Boergers.
3. District 18: Margaret Schweinhaut lost renomination to Patricia R. Sher.
4. District 26: Frank Komenda lost renomination to Gloria G. Lawlah.
5. District 40: Troy Bailey lost renomination to Ralph M. Hughes.

=== In general elections ===
==== Democrats ====
1. District 2: Patricia K. Cushwa lost to Donald F. Munson.
2. District 14: Edward J. Kasemeyer lost to Christopher J. McCabe.

== Detailed results ==
All election results are from the Maryland State Board of Elections.

=== District 1 ===
Maryland Senate District 1 election
Party	Candidate	Votes	%
Republican	John J. Hafer	14,397	58.7
Democratic	Daniel F. McMullen	10,126	41.3
Republican hold			

=== District 2 ===
Maryland Senate District 2 election
Party	Candidate	Votes	%
Republican	Donald F. Munson	13,371	64.1
Democratic	Patricia K. Cushwa (incumbent)	7,477	35.9
Republican gain from Democratic			

=== District 3 ===
Maryland Senate District 3 election
Party	Candidate	Votes	%
Republican	John W. Derr (incumbent)	16,870	100.0
Republican hold			

=== District 4 ===
Maryland Senate District 4 election
Party	Candidate	Votes	%
Democratic	Charles H. Smelser	18,023	100.0
Democratic hold			

=== District 5 ===
Maryland Senate District 5 election
Party	Candidate	Votes	%
Republican	Larry E. Haines	16,400	53.3
Democratic	J. Jeffrey Griffith	14,373	46.7
Republican hold			

=== District 6 ===
Maryland Senate District 6 election
Party	Candidate	Votes	%
Democratic	Michael J. Collins (incumbent)	10,500	60.2
Republican	George Egbert	4,961	28.4
Independent	Frederick George Schiesser	1,985	11.4
Democratic hold			

=== District 7 ===
Maryland Senate District 7 election
Party	Candidate	Votes	%
Democratic	Norman R. Stone Jr. (incumbent)	14,281	99.2
Democratic	Matko Lee Chullin III	113	0.8
Democratic hold			

=== District 8 ===
Maryland Senate District 8 election
Party	Candidate	Votes	%
Democratic	Thomas L. Bromwell (incumbent)	15,710	54.2
Republican	William Rush	13,286	45.8
Democratic hold			

=== District 9 ===
Maryland Senate District 9 election
Party	Candidate	Votes	%
Republican	F. Vernon Boozer (incumbent)	20,175	79.8
Democratic	Kauko H. Kokkonen	5,111	20.2
Republican hold			

=== District 10 ===
Maryland Senate District 10 election
Party	Candidate	Votes	%
Democratic	Janice Piccinini	19,299	55.7
Republican	Richard M. Cornwell	15,334	44.3
Democratic hold			

=== District 11 ===
Maryland Senate District 11 election
Party	Candidate	Votes	%
Democratic	Paula Hollinger (incumbent)	21,077	100.0
Democratic hold			

=== District 12 ===
Maryland Senate District 12 election
Party	Candidate	Votes	%
Democratic	Nancy L. Murphy (incumbent)	12,984	55.2
Republican	Dennis Lanahan	10,534	44.8
Democratic hold			

=== District 13 ===
Maryland Senate District 13 election
Party	Candidate	Votes	%
Democratic	Thomas M. Yeager (incumbent)	17,066	58.5
Republican	Guy L. Harriman	12,120	41.5
Democratic hold			

=== District 14 ===
Maryland Senate District 14 election
Party	Candidate	Votes	%
Republican	Christopher J. McCabe	23,993	50.7
Democratic	Edward J. Kasemeyer (incumbent)	23,357	49.3
Republican gain from Democratic			

=== District 15 ===
Maryland Senate District 15 election
Party	Candidate	Votes	%
Democratic	Laurence Levitan (incumbent)	22,862	57.6
Republican	Robert J. Miller	16,821	42.4
Democratic hold			

=== District 16 ===
Maryland Senate District 16 election
Party	Candidate	Votes	%
Republican	Howard A. Denis (incumbent)	20,041	58.8
Democratic	Charles F. Chester	14,047	41.2
Republican hold			

=== District 17 ===
Maryland Senate District 17 election
Party	Candidate	Votes	%
Democratic	Mary H. Boergers	15,305	69.3
Republican	William J. Skinner	6,772	30.7
Democratic hold			

=== District 18 ===
Maryland Senate District 18 election
Party	Candidate	Votes	%
Democratic	Patricia R. Sher	17,827	100.0
Democratic hold			

=== District 19 ===
Maryland Senate District 19 election
Party	Candidate	Votes	%
Democratic	Idamae Garrott (incumbent)	22,178	72.3
Republican	Herbert S. Rosenberg	8,504	27.7
Democratic hold			

=== District 20 ===
Maryland Senate District 20 election
Party	Candidate	Votes	%
Democratic	Ida G. Ruben (incumbent)	17,941	72.2
Republican	Thomas R. Falcinelli	6,912	27.8
Democratic hold			

=== District 21 ===
Maryland Senate District 21 election
Party	Candidate	Votes	%
Democratic	Arthur Dorman (incumbent)	12,439	81.5
Republican	Abdullah Salim	2,830	18.5
Democratic hold			

=== District 22 ===
Maryland Senate District 22 election
Party	Candidate	Votes	%
Democratic	Thomas Patrick O'Reilly (incumbent)	10,754	78.2
Republican	Jack R. Jones	3,002	21.8
Democratic hold			

=== District 23 ===
Maryland Senate District 23 election
Party	Candidate	Votes	%
Democratic	Leo E. Green (incumbent)	17,190	73.2
Republican	R. Nicholas Palarino	6,263	26.7
Democratic	Donna Jo Campbell	34	0.1
Democratic hold			

=== District 24 ===
Maryland Senate District 24 election
Party	Candidate	Votes	%
Democratic	Decatur "Bucky" Trotter (incumbent)	10,339	83.9
Democratic	Tommie Broadwater	1,983	16.1
Democratic hold			

=== District 25 ===
Maryland Senate District 25 election
Party	Candidate	Votes	%
Democratic	Albert Wynn (incumbent)	12,884	100.0
Democratic hold			

=== District 26 ===
Maryland Senate District 26 election
Party	Candidate	Votes	%
Democratic	Gloria G. Lawlah	12,231	100.0
Democratic hold			

=== District 27 ===
Maryland Senate District 27 election
Party	Candidate	Votes	%
Democratic	Thomas V. Miller Jr. (incumbent)	17,729	83.8
Republican	John Eugene Sellner	3,423	16.2
Democratic hold			

=== District 28 ===
Maryland Senate District 28 election
Party	Candidate	Votes	%
Democratic	James C. Simpson (incumbent)	13,402	59.2
Republican	James H. Easter	9,252	40.8
Democratic hold			

=== District 29 ===
Maryland Senate District 29 election
Party	Candidate	Votes	%
Democratic	Bernie Fowler (incumbent)	18,111	68.6
Republican	Denzil L. Pritchard	8,273	31.4
Democratic hold			

=== District 30 ===
Maryland Senate District 30 election
Party	Candidate	Votes	%
Democratic	Gerald W. Winegrad (incumbent)	18,698	61.7
Republican	Charles Thomann	11,585	38.3
Democratic hold			

=== District 31 ===
Maryland Senate District 31 election
Party	Candidate	Votes	%
Democratic	Philip C. Jimeno (incumbent)	16,715	56.2
Republican	John R. Leopold	13,045	43.8
Democratic hold			

=== District 32 ===
Maryland Senate District 32 election
Party	Candidate	Votes	%
Democratic	Michael J. Wagner (incumbent)	16,423	100.0
Democratic hold			

=== District 33 ===
Maryland Senate District 33 election
Party	Candidate	Votes	%
Republican	John A. Cade	21,321	100.0
Republican hold			

=== District 34 ===
Maryland Senate District 34 election
Party	Candidate	Votes	%
Democratic	Habern W. Freeman	19,050	100.0
Democratic hold			

=== District 35 ===
Maryland Senate District 35 election
Party	Candidate	Votes	%
Democratic	William H. Amoss (incumbent)	15,703	61.4
Republican	James Cooper	9,853	38.6
Democratic hold			

=== District 36 ===
Maryland Senate District 36 election
Party	Candidate	Votes	%
Democratic	Walter M. Baker (incumbent)	14,431	100.0
Democratic hold			

=== District 37 ===
Maryland Senate District 37 election
Party	Candidate	Votes	%
Democratic	Frederick Malkus (incumbent)	13,344	55.4
Republican	Kenneth Gelletly	10,733	44.6
Democratic hold			

=== District 38 ===
Maryland Senate District 38 election
Party	Candidate	Votes	%
Republican	Lewis R. Riley (incumbent)	18,296	100.0
Republican hold			

=== District 39 ===
Maryland Senate District 39 election
Party	Candidate	Votes	%
Democratic	Larry Young (incumbent)	6,844	100.0
Democratic hold			

=== District 40 ===
Maryland Senate District 40 election
Party	Candidate	Votes	%
Democratic	Ralph M. Hughes	8,813	94.4
Republican	Melvin E. Stubbs	526	5.6
Democratic hold			

=== District 41 ===
Maryland Senate District 41 election
Party	Candidate	Votes	%
Democratic	Clarence W. Blount (incumbent)	10,681	100.0
Democratic hold			

=== District 42 ===
Maryland Senate District 42 election
Party	Candidate	Votes	%
Democratic	Barbara A. Hoffman (incumbent)	13,122	100.0
Democratic hold			

=== District 43 ===
Maryland Senate District 43 election
Party	Candidate	Votes	%
Democratic	John A. Pica Jr. (incumbent)	9,537	54.2
Republican	James Brewster	8,058	45.8
Democratic hold			

=== District 44 ===
Maryland Senate District 44 election
Party	Candidate	Votes	%
Democratic	Jullian L. Lapides (incumbent)	10,734	100.0
Republican	Leonard J. Wolf	5	0.0
Democratic hold			

=== District 45 ===
Maryland Senate District 45 election
Party	Candidate	Votes	%
Democratic	Nathan Irby (incumbent)	7,393	91.9
Republican	Lawrence E. Monaghan	654	8.1
Democratic hold			

=== District 46 ===
Maryland Senate District 46 election
Party	Candidate	Votes	%
Democratic	American Joe Miedusiewski (incumbent)	10,037	100.0
Democratic hold			

=== District 47 ===
Maryland Senate District 47 election
Party	Candidate	Votes	%
Democratic	George W. Della Jr. (incumbent)	7,132	100.0
Democratic hold			
