= 1982 Maryland Senate election =

- November 2, 1982

All 47 seats of the Maryland Senate 24 seats needed for a majority
	Majority party	Minority party
Leader	James Clark Jr.	Edward J. Mason (lost renomination)
Party	Democratic	Republican
Leader since	January 1979	1975
Leader's seat	11th district	9th district
Last election	41	6
Seats won	42	5
Seat change	▲1	▼1
President before election
James Clark Jr.
Democratic
President
Melvin Steinberg
Democratic

The 1982 Maryland Senate elections were held on November 2, 1982, as part of the 1982 United States elections, including the 1982 Maryland gubernatorial election. All 47 of Maryland's state senators were up for reelection.

Leading up to the 1982 elections, Republicans were hopeful to gain seats in the legislature, citing Lawrence Hogan and Robert A. Pascal leading the party's ticket in the U.S. Senate and gubernatorial elections, and Ronald Reagan's strong performance in the state during the 1980 United States presidential election and subsequent legislative accomplishments. However, the elections provided to be a major setback for the party as Democrats were able to gain one seat from the Republicans in the state Senate, and Hogan and Pascal lost their elections in landslides.

== Summary ==
=== Closest races ===
Seats where the margin of victory was under 10%:

1. State Senate district 16, 1.73%
2. State Senate district 9, 4.36%
3. State Senate district 30, 4.47%
4. State Senate district 15, 8.59%

== Retiring incumbents ==
=== Democrats ===
1. District 22: Richard A. Palumbo retired to run for the Maryland House of Delegates.
2. District 24: Mary A. Conroy retired.
3. District 32: H. Erle Schafer retired to run for Harford County Executive.
4. District 37: Harry J. McGuirk retired to run for governor of Maryland.
5. District 43: J. Joseph Curran Jr. retired to run for lieutenant governor of Maryland alongside Harry Hughes.
6. District 44: Louise G. Murphy retired.

=== Republicans ===
1. District 11: Robert E. Stroble retired.

== Incumbents defeated ==
=== In primary elections ===
==== Democrats ====
1. District 7: Patrick T. Welsh lost renomination to Norman R. Stone Jr.
2. District 12: Timothy R. Hickman lost renomination to John C. Coolahan.
3. District 34: Art Helton lost renomination to Catherine Riley.
4. District 40: Verda Welcome lost renomination to Troy Brailey.
5. District 45: Robert Douglass lost renomination to Nathan Irby.
6. District 45: Cornell N. Dypski lost renomination to Joseph S. Bonvegna.

==== Republicans ====
1. District 1: Edward J. Mason lost renomination to John N. Bambacus.

== Detailed results ==
All election results are from the 1983-1984 edition of the Maryland Manual.

=== District 1 ===
Maryland Senate District 1 election
Party	Candidate	Votes	%
Republican	John N. Bambacus	19,173	74.2
Democratic	Holmes R. Atkinson	6,667	25.8
Republican hold			

=== District 2 ===
Maryland Senate District 2 election
Party	Candidate	Votes	%
Democratic	Victor Cushwa (incumbent)	13,769	63.2
Republican	Terrance Bache	8,026	36.8
Democratic hold			

=== District 3 ===
Maryland Senate District 3 election
Party	Candidate	Votes	%
Republican	Edward P. Thomas (incumbent)	14,914	64.0
Democratic	Raymond W. Kline	8,401	36.0
Republican hold			

=== District 4 ===
Maryland Senate District 4 election
Party	Candidate	Votes	%
Democratic	Charles H. Smelser (incumbent)	12,945	100.0
Democratic hold			

=== District 5 ===
Maryland Senate District 5 election
Party	Candidate	Votes	%
Republican	Raymond E. Beck	13,567	57.1
Democratic	Roger L. Mann	10,193	42.9
Republican gain from Democratic			

=== District 6 ===
Maryland Senate District 6 election
Party	Candidate	Votes	%
Democratic	Dennis F. Rasmussen (incumbent)	15,438	100.0
Democratic hold			

=== District 7 ===
Maryland Senate District 7 election
Party	Candidate	Votes	%
Democratic	Norman R. Stone Jr. (incumbent)	20,466	100.0
Democratic hold			

=== District 8 ===
Maryland Senate District 8 election
Party	Candidate	Votes	%
Democratic	Thomas L. Bromwell	16,483	66.2
Republican	John P. Quinn	8,434	33.8
Democratic hold			

=== District 9 ===
Maryland Senate District 9 election
Party	Candidate	Votes	%
Republican	F. Vernon Boozer (incumbent)	16,128	52.2
Democratic	Mark C. Medairy Jr.	14,781	47.8
Republican hold			

=== District 10 ===
Maryland Senate District 10 election
Party	Candidate	Votes	%
Democratic	Francis X. Kelly (incumbent)	16,958	64.0
Republican	Kenneth W. Fowler	9,524	36.0
Democratic hold			

=== District 11 ===
Maryland Senate District 11 election
Party	Candidate	Votes	%
Democratic	Melvin Steinberg (incumbent)	24,109	100.0
Democratic hold			

=== District 12 ===
Maryland Senate District 12 election
Party	Candidate	Votes	%
Democratic	John C. Coolahan	17,948	74.0
Republican	John J. Wazniak Jr.	6,290	26.0
Democratic hold			

=== District 13 ===
Maryland Senate District 13 election
Party	Candidate	Votes	%
Democratic	Thomas M. Yeager	15,167	100.0
Democratic hold			

=== District 14 ===
Maryland Senate District 14 election
Party	Candidate	Votes	%
Democratic	James Clark Jr. (incumbent)	20,809	100.0
Democratic hold			

=== District 15 ===
Maryland Senate District 15 election
Party	Candidate	Votes	%
Democratic	Laurence Levitan (incumbent)	15,170	51.9
Republican	Allan C. Levey	12,661	43.3
Write-in		1,386	4.7
Democratic hold			

=== District 16 ===
Maryland Senate District 16 election
Party	Candidate	Votes	%
Republican	Howard A. Denis (incumbent)	17,502	50.9
Democratic	Brian Frosh	16,906	49.1
Republican hold			

=== District 17 ===
Maryland Senate District 18 election
Party	Candidate	Votes	%
Democratic	S. Frank Shore (incumbent)		
Republican	Phyllis B. Fordham		
Democratic hold			

=== District 18 ===
Maryland Senate District 18 election
Party	Candidate	Votes	%
Democratic	Margaret Schweinhaut (incumbent)	20,283	73.8
Republican	Donald H. Dalton	7,192	26.2
Democratic hold			

=== District 19 ===
Maryland Senate District 19 election
Party	Candidate	Votes	%
Democratic	Sidney Kramer (incumbent)	21,812	100.0
Democratic hold			

=== District 20 ===
Maryland Senate District 20 election
Party	Candidate	Votes	%
Democratic	Stewart W. Bainum Jr.	18,561	71.3
Republican	Stephen R. Leventhal	7,466	28.7
Democratic hold			

=== District 21 ===
Maryland Senate District 21 election
Party	Candidate	Votes	%
Democratic	Arthur Dorman (incumbent)	14,042	100.0
Democratic hold			

=== District 22 ===
Maryland Senate District 22 election
Party	Candidate	Votes	%
Democratic	Thomas Patrick O'Reilly (incumbent)	13,331	100.0
Democratic hold			

=== District 23 ===
Maryland Senate District 23 election
Party	Candidate	Votes	%
Democratic	Leo E. Green	16,429	70.4
Republican	Burton W. Oliver	6,915	29.6
Democratic hold			

=== District 24 ===
Maryland Senate District 24 election
Party	Candidate	Votes	%
Democratic	Tommie Broadwater (incumbent)	12,203	100.0
Democratic hold			

=== District 25 ===
Maryland Senate District 25 election
Party	Candidate	Votes	%
Democratic	B. W. Mike Donovan (incumbent)	9,951	73.4
Republican	James Whitehead	2,948	21.7
Write-in		658	4.9
Democratic hold			

=== District 26 ===
Maryland Senate District 26 election
Party	Candidate	Votes	%
Democratic	Frank J. Komenda	13,491	80.2
Republican	George L. Price	3,330	19.8
Democratic hold			

=== District 27 ===
Maryland Senate District 27 election
Party	Candidate	Votes	%
Democratic	Thomas V. Miller Jr. (incumbent)	14,456	100.0
Democratic hold			

=== District 28 ===
Maryland Senate District 28 election
Party	Candidate	Votes	%
Democratic	James C. Simpson (incumbent)	14,943	80.7
Republican	Saad Kassem	3,567	19.3
Democratic hold			

=== District 29 ===
Maryland Senate District 29 election
Party	Candidate	Votes	%
Democratic	Bernie Fowler	14,449	70.3
Republican	David M. King (incumbent)	6,114	29.7
Democratic hold			

=== District 30 ===
Maryland Senate District 30 election
Party	Candidate	Votes	%
Democratic	Gerald W. Winegard	12,972	52.2
Republican	P. Tyson Bennett	11,861	47.8
Democratic gain from Republican			

=== District 31 ===
Maryland Senate District 31 election
Party	Candidate	Votes	%
Democratic	Jerome F. Connell Sr. (incumbent)	14,505	61.9
Republican	Thomas J. Harden III	8,913	38.1
Democratic hold			

=== District 32 ===
Maryland Senate District 32 election
Party	Candidate	Votes	%
Democratic	Michael J. Wagner	13,546	100.0
Democratic hold			

=== District 33 ===
Maryland Senate District 33 election
Party	Candidate	Votes	%
Republican	John A. Cade (incumbent)	12,803	100.0
Republican hold			

=== District 34 ===
Maryland Senate District 34 election
Party	Candidate	Votes	%
Democratic	Catherine Riley	16,818	78.9
Republican	Dorothy A. Wilson	4,508	21.1
Democratic hold			

=== District 35 ===
Maryland Senate District 35 election
Party	Candidate	Votes	%
Democratic	William H. Amoss	18,682	100.0
Democratic hold			

=== District 36 ===
Maryland Senate District 36 election
Party	Candidate	Votes	%
Democratic	Walter M. Baker (incumbent)	12,459	58.9
Republican	Bernard M. Hopkins	8,703	41.1
Democratic hold			

=== District 37 ===
Maryland Senate District 37 election
Party	Candidate	Votes	%
Democratic	Frederick Malkus (incumbent)	16,101	70.3
Republican	Rose Marie Spanagel	6,810	29.7
Democratic hold			

=== District 38 ===
Maryland Senate District 38 election
Party	Candidate	Votes	%
Democratic	Joseph J. Long Sr. (incumbent)	18,575	100.0
Democratic hold			

=== District 39 ===
Maryland Senate District 39 election
Party	Candidate	Votes	%
Democratic	Clarence Mitchell III (incumbent)	13,973	91.3
Republican	Leana B. Thomas	1,328	8.7
Democratic hold			

=== District 40 ===
Maryland Senate District 40 election
Party	Candidate	Votes	%
Democratic	Troy Brailey	15,278	100.0
Democratic hold			

=== District 41 ===
Maryland Senate District 41 election
Party	Candidate	Votes	%
Democratic	Clarence W. Blount (incumbent)	18,250	94.7
Republican	Otis E. Lee Sr.	1,027	5.3
Democratic hold			

=== District 42 ===
Maryland Senate District 42 election
Party	Candidate	Votes	%
Democratic	Rosalie Silber Abrams (incumbent)	19,673	100.0
Democratic hold			

=== District 43 ===
Maryland Senate District 43 election
Party	Candidate	Votes	%
Democratic	John A. Pica Jr.	17,025	68.0
Republican	Richard D. Bennett	7,995	32.0
Democratic hold			

=== District 44 ===
Maryland Senate District 44 election
Party	Candidate	Votes	%
Democratic	Julian L. Lapides (incumbent)	17,827	87.7
Republican	John T. Smith	2,491	12.3
Democratic hold			

=== District 45 ===
Maryland Senate District 45 election
Party	Candidate	Votes	%
Democratic	Nathan Irby	14,756	93.9
Republican	James D. David	951	6.1
Democratic hold			

=== District 46 ===
Maryland Senate District 46 election
Party	Candidate	Votes	%
Democratic	Joseph S. Bonvegna (incumbent)	18,066	100.0
Democratic hold			

=== District 47 ===
Maryland Senate District 47 election
Party	Candidate	Votes	%
Democratic	George W. Della Jr.	12,321	100.0
Democratic hold			
