= 1986 Maryland Senate election =

- November 4, 1986

All 47 seats of the Maryland Senate 24 seats needed for a majority
	Majority party	Minority party
Leader	Melvin Steinberg (retired)	John A. Cade
Party	Democratic	Republican
Leader since	January 1983	1984
Leader's seat	11th district	9th district
Last election	41	6
Seats won	40	7
Seat change	▼1	▲1
President before election
Melvin Steinberg
Democratic
President
Thomas V. Miller Jr.
Democratic

The 1986 Maryland Senate election were held on November 4, 1986, to elect senators in all 47 districts of the Maryland Senate. Members were elected in single-member constituencies to four-year terms. These elections were held concurrently with various federal and state elections, including for Governor of Maryland.

Following landslide victories for Paul Sarbanes and Harry Hughes in the 1982 elections, Republicans largely spent the following four years rebuilding the party. The party began its 1986 campaigns in a strong position with White House aide Linda Chavez leading the ticket, however, the party's status weakened as the election approached, with it shifting its focus away from legislative gains and toward limiting its legislative losses.

== Summary ==
=== Closest races ===
Seats where the margin of victory was under 10%:

1. State Senate district 16, 7.45%
2. State Senate district 14, 8.12%

== Retiring incumbents ==
=== Democrats ===
1. District 11: Melvin Steinberg retired to run for lieutenant governor of Maryland alongside William Donald Schaefer.
2. District 14: James Clark Jr. retired.
3. District 19: Sidney Kramer retired to run for Montgomery County Executive.
4. District 20: Stewart W. Bainum Jr. retired to run for Congress in Maryland's 8th congressional district.
5. District 25: B. W. Mike Donovan retired.
6. District 38: Joseph J. Long Sr. retired.
7. District 39: Clarence Mitchell III retired to run for Congress in Maryland's 7th congressional district.

== Detailed results ==
All election results are from the Maryland State Board of Elections.

=== District 1 ===
Maryland Senate District 1 election
Party	Candidate	Votes	%
Republican	John N. Bambacus (incumbent)	16,370	100.0
Republican hold			

=== District 2 ===
Maryland Senate District 2 election
Party	Candidate	Votes	%
Democratic	Victor Cushwa (incumbent)	15,642	100.0
Democratic hold			

=== District 3 ===
Maryland Senate District 3 election
Party	Candidate	Votes	%
Republican	John W. Derr (incumbent)	15,553	68.4
Democratic	Gerald Downs	7,200	31.6
Republican hold			

=== District 4 ===
Maryland Senate District 4 election
Party	Candidate	Votes	%
Democratic	Charles H. Smelser (incumbent)	12,673	56.4
Republican	John Thompson	9,805	43.6
Democratic hold			

=== District 5 ===
Maryland Senate District 5 election
Party	Candidate	Votes	%
Republican	Raymond E. Beck (incumbent)	17,117	72.0
Democratic	Robert E. Spellman	6,651	28.0
Republican hold			

=== District 6 ===
Maryland Senate District 6 election
Party	Candidate	Votes	%
Democratic	Michael J. Collins (incumbent)	13,434	80.0
Republican	Teresa Mancuso Albright	3,368	20.0
Democratic hold			

=== District 7 ===
Maryland Senate District 7 election
Party	Candidate	Votes	%
Democratic	Norman R. Stone Jr. (incumbent)	18,779	100.0
Democratic hold			

=== District 8 ===
Maryland Senate District 8 election
Party	Candidate	Votes	%
Democratic	Thomas L. Bromwell (incumbent)	19,730	73.2
Republican	Edward J. Glusing Jr.	7,211	26.8
Democratic hold			

=== District 9 ===
Maryland Senate District 9 election
Party	Candidate	Votes	%
Republican	F. Vernon Boozer (incumbent)	16,854	100.0
Republican hold			

=== District 10 ===
Maryland Senate District 10 election
Party	Candidate	Votes	%
Democratic	Francis X. Kelly (incumbent)	18,655	65.9
Republican	Clarence E. Ritter	9,656	34.1
Democratic hold			

=== District 11 ===
Maryland Senate District 11 election
Party	Candidate	Votes	%
Democratic	Paula Hollinger	23,475	100.0
Democratic hold			

=== District 12 ===
Maryland Senate District 12 election
Party	Candidate	Votes	%
Democratic	John C. Coolahan (incumbent)	18,890	100.0
Democratic hold			

=== District 13 ===
Maryland Senate District 13 election
Party	Candidate	Votes	%
Democratic	Thomas M. Yeager (incumbent)	15,264	62.3
Republican	John C. Murphy	9,238	37.7
Democratic hold			

=== District 14 ===
Maryland Senate District 14 election
Party	Candidate	Votes	%
Democratic	Edward J. Kasemeyer	19,388	54.1
Republican	Christopher J. McCabe	16,475	45.9
Democratic hold			

=== District 15 ===
Maryland Senate District 15 election
Party	Candidate	Votes	%
Democratic	Laurence Levitan	20,607	63.4
Republican	Robin Ficker	11,908	36.6
Democratic hold			

=== District 16 ===
Maryland Senate District 16 election
Party	Candidate	Votes	%
Republican	Howard A. Denis (incumbent)	19,345	53.7
Democratic	Marilyn R. Goldwater	16,661	46.3
Republican hold			

=== District 17 ===
Maryland Senate District 17 election
Party	Candidate	Votes	%
Democratic	S. Frank Shore (incumbent)	15,621	69.2
Republican	Jeffrey Wayne Skinner	6,967	30.8
Democratic hold			

=== District 18 ===
Maryland Senate District 18 election
Party	Candidate	Votes	%
Democratic	Margaret Schweinhaut (incumbent)	19,163	72.8
Republican	Susan Lee White	7,161	27.2
Democratic hold			

=== District 19 ===
Maryland Senate District 19 election
Party	Candidate	Votes	%
Democratic	Idamae Garrott	19,999	65.8
Republican	Thomas P. Sheahan	10,413	34.2
Democratic hold			

=== District 20 ===
Maryland Senate District 20 election
Party	Candidate	Votes	%
Democratic	Ida G. Ruben	18,906	72.9
Republican	Stephen Leventhal	7,029	27.1
Democratic hold			

=== District 21 ===
Maryland Senate District 21 election
Party	Candidate	Votes	%
Democratic	Arthur Dorman (incumbent)	12,341	100.0
Democratic hold			

=== District 22 ===
Maryland Senate District 22 election
Party	Candidate	Votes	%
Democratic	Thomas Patrick O'Reilly (incumbent)	11,523	79.9
Republican	Jo Mimms-Bolden	2,901	20.1
Democratic hold			

=== District 23 ===
Maryland Senate District 23 election
Party	Candidate	Votes	%
Democratic	Leo E. Green (incumbent)	16,828	76.2
Republican	Michael B. Twigg	5,263	23.8
Democratic hold			

=== District 24 ===
Maryland Senate District 24 election
Party	Candidate	Votes	%
Democratic	Decatur "Bucky" Trotter (incumbent)	11,581	100.0
Democratic hold			

=== District 25 ===
Maryland Senate District 25 election
Party	Candidate	Votes	%
Democratic	Albert Wynn	10,853	85.6
Republican	Gregory K. Washington	1,828	14.4
Democratic hold			

=== District 26 ===
Maryland Senate District 26 election
Party	Candidate	Votes	%
Democratic	Frank Komenda (incumbent)	12,691	83.8
Republican	Thomas Douglas Chambers	2,460	16.2
Democratic hold			

=== District 27 ===
Maryland Senate District 27 election
Party	Candidate	Votes	%
Democratic	Thomas V. Miller Jr. (incumbent)	15,507	81.6
Democratic	Ronald R. Austin	3,502	18.4
Democratic hold			

=== District 28 ===
Maryland Senate District 28 election
Party	Candidate	Votes	%
Democratic	James C. Simpson (incumbent)	15,570	100.0
Democratic hold			

=== District 29 ===
Maryland Senate District 29 election
Party	Candidate	Votes	%
Democratic	Bernie Fowler (incumbent)	15,392	72.5
Republican	James D. Warn	5,851	27.5
Democratic hold			

=== District 30 ===
Maryland Senate District 30 election
Party	Candidate	Votes	%
Democratic	Gerald W. Winegrad (incumbent)	16,287	64.9
Republican	Charles Thomamm	8,793	35.1
Democratic hold			

=== District 31 ===
Maryland Senate District 31 election
Party	Candidate	Votes	%
Democratic	Philip C. Jimeno (incumbent)	16,999	100.0
Democratic hold			

=== District 32 ===
Maryland Senate District 32 election
Party	Candidate	Votes	%
Democratic	Michael J. Wagner (incumbent)	13,804	100.0
Democratic hold			

=== District 33 ===
Maryland Senate District 33 election
Party	Candidate	Votes	%
Republican	John A. Cade (incumbent)	14,463	68.3
Democratic	Robert J. Cancelliere	6,725	31.7
Republican hold			

=== District 34 ===
Maryland Senate District 34 election
Party	Candidate	Votes	%
Democratic	Catherine Riley (incumbent)	17,473	80.0
Republican	Francis J. Eurice	4,374	20.0
Democratic hold			

=== District 35 ===
Maryland Senate District 35 election
Party	Candidate	Votes	%
Democratic	William H. Amoss (incumbent)	16,142	68.7
Republican	James Cooper	7,340	31.3
Democratic hold			

=== District 36 ===
Maryland Senate District 36 election
Party	Candidate	Votes	%
Democratic	Walter M. Baker (incumbent)	12,204	58.2
Republican	Bernard M. Hopkins	8,778	41.8
Democratic hold			

=== District 37 ===
Maryland Senate District 37 election
Party	Candidate	Votes	%
Democratic	Frederick Malkus (incumbent)	15,912	100.0
Democratic hold			

=== District 38 ===
Maryland Senate District 38 election
Party	Candidate	Votes	%
Republican	Lewis R. Riley	14,974	100.0
Republican gain from Democratic			

=== District 39 ===
Maryland Senate District 39 election
Party	Candidate	Votes	%
Democratic	Michael B. Mitchell	8,754	85.6
Republican	Victor Clark Jr.	1,476	14.4
Democratic hold			

=== District 40 ===
Maryland Senate District 40 election
Party	Candidate	Votes	%
Democratic	Troy Brailey (incumbent)	11,584	96.2
Republican	Melvin Stubbs	456	3.8
Democratic hold			

=== District 41 ===
Maryland Senate District 41 election
Party	Candidate	Votes	%
Democratic	Clarence W. Blount (incumbent)	13,722	100.0
Democratic hold			

=== District 42 ===
Maryland Senate District 42 election
Party	Candidate	Votes	%
Democratic	Barbara A. Hoffman	16,929	100.0
Democratic hold			

=== District 43 ===
Maryland Senate District 43 election
Party	Candidate	Votes	%
Democratic	John A. Pica Jr. (incumbent)	16,354	100.0
Democratic hold			

=== District 44 ===
Maryland Senate District 44 election
Party	Candidate	Votes	%
Democratic	Julian L. Lapides (incumbent)	14,638	100.0
Democratic hold			

=== District 45 ===
Maryland Senate District 45 election
Party	Candidate	Votes	%
Democratic	Nathan Irby (incumbent)	10,854	93.3
Republican	Mary L. O'Brien	784	6.7
Democratic hold			

=== District 46 ===
Maryland Senate District 46 election
Party	Candidate	Votes	%
Democratic	Joseph S. Bonvegna (incumbent)	16,160	100.0
Democratic hold			

=== District 47 ===
Maryland Senate District 47 election
Party	Candidate	Votes	%
Democratic	George W. Della Jr. (incumbent)	10,378	100.0
Democratic hold			
