= 1994 Maryland gubernatorial election =

- November 8, 1994
- Turnout: 60.67% ▲5.82%

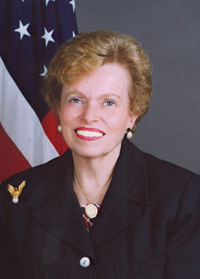
Nominee	Parris Glendening	Ellen Sauerbrey
Party	Democratic	Republican
Running mate	Kathleen Kennedy Townsend	Paul Rappaport
Popular vote	708,094	702,101
Percentage	50.21%	49.78%
- County results Glendening: 50–60% 60–70% 70–80% Sauerbrey: 50–60% 60–70% 70–80%
Governor before election
William Donald Schaefer
Democratic
Elected Governor
Parris Glendening
Democratic

The 1994 Maryland gubernatorial election was held on November 8, 1994. Incumbent Democratic governor William Donald Schaefer was ineligible for re-election. Prince George's County Executive Parris Glendening emerged victorious from the Democratic primary after defeating several candidates. Maryland House minority leader Ellen Sauerbrey, who would also be the 1998 Republican nominee for governor, won her party's nomination.

In the general election, Glendening narrowly defeated Sauerbrey by a margin of 50.21 percent to 49.78 percent, or by 5,993 votes, the closest gubernatorial election in Maryland since 1919 and the first gubernatorial election in Maryland history to be decided by an absentee runoff. Sauerbrey's campaign challenged the results of the election, filing a lawsuit alleging voter fraud and election irregularities; her claims were rejected by Anne Arundel Circuit Court Judge Raymond G. Thieme Jr. in January 1995.

This election marked the first time since 1915 that a Democrat won Maryland without Baltimore County, the first time since 1930 that a Democrat won Maryland without Cecil County, and the first time since 1919 that a Democrat won without St. Mary's County. This is the last time Howard County voted for the statewide loser.

== Democratic primary ==
=== Campaign ===
Baltimore mayor Kurt Schmoke, who was seen as the likely Democratic frontrunner in the race, announced in September 1993 that he would not run for governor, instead opting for a third term as mayor in 1995.

Prince George's County Executive Parris Glendening, Lieutenant Governor Melvin Steinberg, and state senator Mary Boergers were among the first candidates to enter the race for governor. Governor William Donald Schaefer, unimpressed with the early candidates, who were distancing themselves from Schaefer, encouraged state senator American Joe Miedusiewski and U.S. representatives Steny Hoyer and Ben Cardin to enter the race. Although Miedusiewski entered the race a few weeks later, Schaefer declined to endorse him, saying that he didn't do endorsements, but urged voters to support him.

Steinberg was initially viewed as the frontrunner of the Democratic primary, but his campaign suffered from poor fundraising and gaffes that contributed to his dwindling lead in polling. Glendening receiving the endorsements of both Schmoke and Montgomery County Executive Neal Potter established him as the new frontrunner in the race and gave him an overwhelming lead in the Washington, D.C. suburbs and Baltimore City, which led to his resounding victory in the Democratic primary in September 1994.

=== Candidates ===
==== Nominee ====
- Parris Glendening, Prince George's County Executive
  - Running mate: Kathleen Kennedy Townsend, assistant attorney general for the U.S. Department of Justice and daughter of Robert F. Kennedy

==== Eliminated in primary ====
- Don Allensworth, college professor, investor, and planning consultant
  - Running mate: Linda K. Hartman
- Mary Boergers, state senator from the 17th district
  - Running mate: Barbara Osborn Kreamer, former state delegate from the 34th district
- Walter Gilcrist Finch, attorney
  - Running mate: John Siegert, insurance agent
- Lawrence K. Freeman, Lyndon LaRouche activist and perennial candidate
  - Running mate: Mark Nafziger, Lyndon LaRouche activist and economist
- American Joe Miedusiewski, state senator from the 46th district
  - Running mate: Bernie Fowler, state senator from the 29th district
- Melvin Steinberg, lieutenant governor of Maryland
  - Running mate: James C. Simpson, state senator from the 28th district (previously Thomas P. O'Reilly, state senator from the 22nd district, who withdrew after being appointed to the Maryland Workers' Compensation Commission)

==== Withdrawn ====
- Stewart W. Bainum Jr., CEO of Manor Care Inc. and former state senator from the 20th district
- Frank M. Conaway Sr., former state delegate from the 40th district (endorsed Glendening)
- Edward J. Kasemeyer, former state senator from the 14th district (ran for state senator)

==== Declined ====
- Ben Cardin, U.S. representative for Maryland's 3rd congressional district (ran for re-election)
- J. Joseph Curran Jr., Attorney General of Maryland (ran for re-election)
- Steny Hoyer, U.S. representative for Maryland's 5th congressional district (ran for re-election, endorsed Glendening)
- Donald P. Hutchinson, former Baltimore County Executive
- R. Clayton Mitchell Jr., Speaker of the Maryland House of Delegates from the 36th district
- Kurt Schmoke, mayor of Baltimore (ran for re-election, endorsed Glendening)

=== Endorsements ===
Mary Boergers

Organizations

- EMILY's List
Parris Glendening

U.S. representatives

- Steny Hoyer, MD-05

Statewide elected officials

- Harry Hughes, former governor of Maryland

State senators

- Decatur "Bucky" Trotter, 24th district

State delegates

- Frank M. Conaway Sr., 40th district
- Gene Counihan, 15th district
- Peter Franchot, 20th district
- Brian Frosh, 16th district
- Nancy Kopp, 16th district

Local officials

- Bill Campbell, mayor of Atlanta
- Neal Potter, Montgomery County Executive
- Kurt Schmoke, mayor of Baltimore
- Carl Stokes, Baltimore city councilor

Individuals

- Larry S. Gibson, lawyer and political organizer

Organizations

- Maryland Fraternal Order of Police
- Maryland League of Conservation Voters

Labor unions

- Maryland State and D.C. AFL-CIO
- Maryland-D.C. Building Trades Council (co-endorsement with Miedusiewski)

Newspapers

- The Baltimore Sun (Democratic primary only)
American Joe Miedusiewski

State senators

- Thomas L. Bromwell, 8th district
- John C. Coolahan, 12th district

Labor unions

- Maryland-D.C. Building Trades Council (co-endorsement with Glendening)
Melvin Steinberg

State delegates

- Frank Boston, 41st district

Labor unions

- United Food and Commercial Workers
Declined to endorse

Statewide officials

- William Donald Schaefer, incumbent governor of Maryland

=== Polling ===
Poll source	Date(s) administered	Sample size (Note: Key: A – all adults RV – registered voters LV – likely voters V – unclear)	Margin of error	Mary Boergers	Parris Glendening	American Joe Miedusiewski	Melvin Steinberg	Other	Undecided
Mason-Dixon Research	September 7–8, 1994	581 (LV)	± 4.1%	10%	45%	13%	20%	2%	10%
Mason-Dixon Research	August 26–28, 1994	421 (LV)	± 4.8%	8%	43%	10%	16%	2%	21%
Mason-Dixon Research	July 15–17, 1994	839 (RV)	± 3.5%	12%	38%	16%	11%	–	23%
Mason-Dixon Research	June 16–18, 1994	818 (RV)	± 5.0%	10%	31%	7%	21%	–	31%
Maryland Businesses for Responsible Government	April 21–27, 1994	814 (LV)	–	7%	16%	5.4%	15.4%	–	–
Mason-Dixon Research	January 31 – February 2, 1994	491 (RV)	± 3.5%	8%	18%	4%	28%	–	–
Mason-Dixon Research	January 31 – February 2, 1994	491 (RV)	± 3.5%	9%	19%	4%	28%	5% (Note: Stewart Bainum with 5%)	–
Cooper & Secrest Associates (Note: Poll sponsored by Steinberg's campaign.)	December 13–19, 1993	814 (LV)	–	7%	16%	6%	26%	–	45%

Hypothetical polling

Poll source	Date(s) administered	Sample size	Margin of error	Mary Boergers	J. Joseph Curran Jr.	Parris Glendening	R. Clayton Mitchell Jr.	Kurt Schmoke	Melvin Steinberg	Undecided
Mason-Dixon Research	July 29–31, 1993	502 (RV)	± 3.5%	11%	11%	12%	–	33%	13%	27%
Mason-Dixon Research	February 26–28, 1993	811 (LV)	± 3.5%	–	15%	10%	5%	31%	13%	27%
Mason-Dixon Research	February 26–28, 1993	811 (LV)	± 3.5%	–	21%	15%	–	–	19%	45%

=== Results ===
Results by county Glendening: 30–40%; 40–50%; 50–60%; 60–70%; 80–90%; Miedusiewski: 40–50%

Democratic primary results
Party	Candidate	Votes	%
Democratic	Parris Glendening; Kathleen Kennedy Townsend	293,314	53.59
Democratic	American Joe Miedusiewski; Bernie Fowler	100,296	18.32
Democratic	Melvin A. Steinberg; James C. Simpson	82,308	15.04
Democratic	Mary Boergers; Barbara Osborn Kreamer	46,888	8.57
Democratic	Don Allensworth; Linda Hartman	15,680	2.86
Democratic	Walter Gilcrist Finch; John Siegert	5,369	0.98
Democratic	Lawrence K. Freeman; Mark Nafziger	3,518	0.64
Total votes		547,373	100.00

== Republican primary ==
=== Campaign ===
Ahead of the election, Republicans expressed optimism in their ability to retake the governor's office, with party nominees receiving about 40 percent of the vote in recent elections and polls showing voters strongly disapproving of Governor William Donald Schaefer as a result of his support for an $800 million tax restructuring package and media coverage of his "style" problems, including his "shithouse" gaffe. Potential Republican candidates predicted a crowded Democratic field to succeed Schaefer in 1994 and a resulting fratricide that would make coalescing around a single candidate following the primary elections challenging for the Democratic Party. Republicans also believed that the party was likely to nominate an urban-oriented nominee, which they saw as an ideal general election opponent.

1990 gubernatorial nominee William Shepard became the first candidate to enter the race, followed shortly afterwards by House of Delegates minority leader Ellen Sauerbrey in April 1993. Anne Arundel County Executive Robert R. Neall, who was viewed as the early Republican frontrunner, announced in October 1993 that he would not run for governor, clearing a path for U.S. representative Helen Delich Bentley, who announced her candidacy for governor a month later.

Sauerbrey steadily rose in polling during the Republican primary election, bringing the gap between her and Bentley within 13 points five days before the primary. She also criticized Bentley as a "big-spending liberal", citing her voting record in Congress; Bentley did not respond to Sauerbrey's attacks and chose to keep a low profile at debates, instead focusing on the general election. Sauerbrey won the Republican nomination in an upset in September 1994, defeating Bentley by a margin of 52 percent to 38 percent. Sauerbrey's surprise win marked a rightward shift in the Maryland Republican Party's politics and was one of many defeats for the Republican establishment, as voters rejected two of the state's three members on the Republican National Committee and defeated establishment candidate Richard Taylor in the comptroller primary election.

=== Candidates ===
==== Nominee ====
- Ellen Sauerbrey, minority leader of the Maryland House of Delegates from the 10th district
  - Running mate: Paul Rappaport, former chief of the Howard County Police Department and lawyer

==== Eliminated in primary ====
- Helen Delich Bentley, U.S. representative for Maryland's 2nd congressional district
  - Running mate: Howard A. Denis, state senator from the 16th district
- William S. Shepard, diplomat and nominee for governor in 1990
  - Running mate: Julia Walsh Gouge, Carroll County commissioner

==== Declined ====
- Robert R. Neall, Anne Arundel County Executive

=== Endorsements ===
Helen Delich Bentley

U.S. senators

- J. Glenn Beall Jr., Maryland
- Charles Mathias, Maryland

U.S. representatives

- Connie Morella, MD-08

Statewide elected officials

- Carroll A. Campbell Jr., governor of South Carolina

Organizations

- Maryland Fraternal Order of Police
Ellen Sauerbrey

Executive branch officials

- Jack Kemp, former U.S. Secretary of Housing and Urban Development

=== Polling ===
Poll source	Date(s) administered	Sample size	Margin of error	Helen Delich Bentley	Ellen Sauerbrey	William Shephard	Undecided
Mason-Dixon Research	September 7–8, 1994	368 (LV)	± 5.2%	45%	32%	7%	16%
Mason-Dixon Research	August 26–28, 1994	228 (LV)	± 6.6%	44%	27%	10%	19%
Mason-Dixon Research	July 15–17, 1994	839 (RV)	± 3.5%	48%	14%	11%	27%
Mason-Dixon Research	June 16–18, 1994	818 (RV)	± 5.0%	41%	11%	9%	39%
Tarrant Group (Note: Poll sponsored by Bentley's campaign.)	May 10–11, 1994	700 (V)	–	43%	9%	7%	–
Maryland Businesses for Responsible Government	April 21–27, 1994	814 (LV)	–	28.5%	10.4%	14.5%	–
Mason-Dixon Research	January 31 – February 2, 1994	261 (RV)	± 3.5%	46%	7%	9%	38%

Hypothetical polling

Poll source	Date(s) administered	Sample size	Margin of error	Helen Delich Bentley	Bill Brock	Robert Neall	Ellen Sauerbrey	William Shephard	Undecided
Mason-Dixon Research	July 29–31, 1993	502 (RV)	± 3.5%	31%	–	19%	6%	5%	39%
Mason-Dixon Research	February 26–28, 1993	811 (LV)	± 3.5%	34%	4%	10%	–	11%	41%
Mason-Dixon Research	February 26–28, 1993	811 (LV)	± 3.5%	–	5%	17%	13%	13%	52%

=== Results ===
Results by county Sauerbrey: 40–50%; 50–60%; 60–70%; Bentley: 40–50%; 50–60%

Republican primary results
Party	Candidate	Votes	%
Republican	Ellen Sauerbrey; Paul Rappaport	123,676	52.18
Republican	Helen Delich Bentley; Howard A. Denis	89,821	37.90
Republican	William S. Shepard; Julia Walsh Gouge	23,505	9.92
Total votes		237,002	100.00

== General election ==
=== Predictions ===
Source	Rating	As of
The Cook Political Report	Lean D	October 24, 1994

=== Campaign ===
In the general election, Glendening sought to position himself as a prudent fiscal manager, citing his record as county executive, and on a platform supporting education, public safety, and environmental protection. Sauerbrey continued to campaign on lowering taxes and deregulation.

In the final eight weeks of the election, Glendening spent $2.5 million on campaign ads portraying Sauerbrey as a right-wing extremist who would roll back protections on gun control and abortion rights, and associating her with televangelist Pat Robertson and his Christian Coalition, who distributed campaign literature in churches spotlighting certain political positions of Glendening and Sauerbrey. He also criticized her pledge to cut taxes, calling her a "millionairess" and arguing that it would curtail essential state services and force local jurisdictions to compensate by raising property taxes. As a result of the ad blitz, Sauerbrey's approval ratings fell into the 30 percent range within the final days of the election.

Glendening's narrow win in the general election against Sauerbrey led Governor Schaefer to call for a "rebuilding" of the Maryland Democratic Party led by U.S. senator Barbara Mikulski.

=== Endorsements ===
Parris Glendening (D)

Executive branch officials

- James Brady, former White House Press Secretary (Republican)

Statewide officials

- William Donald Schaefer, incumbent governor of Maryland

State senators

- American Joe Miedusiewski, 46th district

Local officials

- Clarence H. Burns, former mayor of Baltimore

Individuals

- Sarah Brady, gun control advocate and wife of James Brady
- Bill Marriott, chairman of Marriott International (Republican)

Organizations

- Maryland National Women's Political Caucus chapter

Newspapers

- The Baltimore Sun
Ellen Sauerbrey (R)

U.S. representatives

- Helen Delich Bentley, MD-02
- Wayne Gilchrest, MD-01

Party officials

- Haley Barbour, chair of the Republican National Committee

Organizations

- NRA Political Victory Fund

=== Polling ===
Poll source	Date(s) administered	Sample size	Margin of error	Parris Glendening (D)	Ellen Sauerbrey (R)	Undecided
Mason-Dixon Research	November 2–4, 1994	1,100 (LV)	± 3.0%	47%	45%	–
Mason-Dixon Research	October 13–15, 1994	826 (RV)	± 3.5%	48%	42%	10%
The Washington Post	October 8–11, 1994	808 (LV)	± 4.0%	53%	37%	10%
Mason-Dixon Research	September 21–23, 1994	829 (RV)	± 3.5%	47%	40%	13%
Hypotenuse Inc.	Early September 1994	500 (RV)	± 4.5%	48%	47%	–

Hypothetical polling

Parris Glendening vs. Helen Delich Bentley

Poll source	Date(s) administered	Sample size	Margin of error	Parris Glendening	Helen Delich Bentley	Undecided
Mason-Dixon Research	August 26–28, 1994	824 (LV)	± 3.5%	43%	37%	20%
Mason-Dixon Research	July 15–17, 1994	839 (RV)	± 3.5%	38%	41%	21%
Mason-Dixon Research	June 16–18, 1994	818 (RV)	± 5.0%	37%	35%	28%
Tarrant Group	May 10–11, 1994	700 (V)	–	37%	39%	24%

Melvin Steinberg vs. Helen Delich Bentley

Poll source	Date(s) administered	Sample size	Margin of error	Melvin Steinberg	Helen Delich Bentley	Undecided
Tarrant Group	May 10–11, 1994	700 (V)	–	32%	38%	30%
Mason-Dixon Research	January 31 – February 2, 1994	261 (RV)	± 3.5%	28%	34%	38%

=== Results ===
Maryland gubernatorial election, 1994
Party	Candidate	Votes	%	±%
Democratic	Parris Glendening; Kathleen Kennedy Townsend	708,094	50.21%	−9.55%
Republican	Ellen Sauerbrey; Paul Rappaport	702,101	49.78%	+9.55%
Write-in		105	0.02%	N/A
Majority		5,993	0.42%	−19.58%
Turnout		1,410,300	60.67%	+5.82%
Democratic hold		Swing		

=== Dispute over results ===
On November 12, 1994, Sauerbrey's campaign said that it had hired sixteen professional investigators, led by attorney George Beall and party counsel Chris West, to probe complaints of voter fraud and irregularities in the gubernatorial general election. The investigation claimed that voting machines in Prince George's and Montgomery counties and the city of Baltimore had been tampered with to record votes from 4,774 incarcerated individuals, 37 dead voters, 71 individuals who provided elections officials with addresses of vacant buildings, 20 unregistered voters, and 84 voters who had voted twice. Sauerbrey filed an unprecedented lawsuit seeking to overturn the general election results, citing the findings of her investigation and earlier claims that about 2,000 absentee ballots were cast without a required affidavit or processed early by election officials. Lawyers for the Glendening campaign sought to dismiss Sauerbrey's lawsuit, saying that the alleged voting irregularities were "the result of [at worst] excusable neglect, or do not involve intentionally wrongful acts or acts of fraud by voters, election officials, or others" and that Sauerbrey could not prove that such voters cast ballots for Glendening or voted in the governor's race at all. Maryland attorney general J. Joseph Curran Jr. also sought the dismissal of the lawsuit, saying that the Constitution of Maryland gave the Maryland House of Delegates exclusive jurisdiction over deciding the outcome of a disputed gubernatorial election.

On January 14, 1995, Anne Arundel Circuit Court Judge Raymond G. Thieme Jr. rejected Sauerbrey's claims, saying that while the Maryland Republican Party's investigation of the election presented "serious problems in Baltimore City", Sauerbrey presented no "clear and convincing" proof of election fraud. Sauerbrey initially planned to appeal Judge Thieme's decision, but withdrew her appeal on January 16, 1995.

In November 2020, in an interview with Maryland Matters after President Donald Trump made false claims about voter fraud in the 2020 presidential election, Sauerbrey expressed no regrets about challenging her 1994 election outcome.

== Notes ==
Partisan clients
