= Mary Pat Clarke =

American politician (1941–2024)

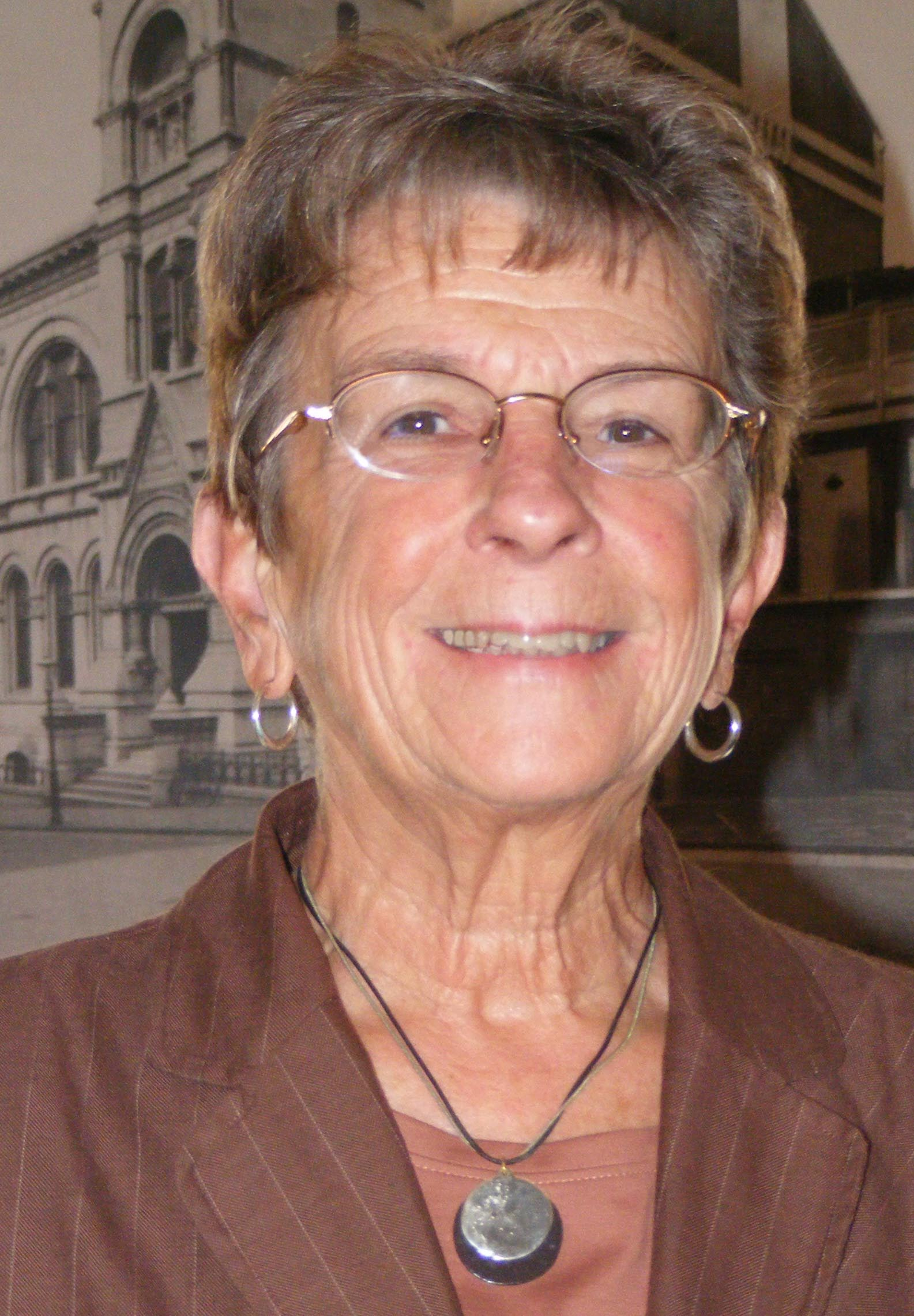
- Clarke in 2007

Member of the Baltimore City Council from the 14th district
- In office January 2003 – December 2020
- Preceded by: Lisa Stancil
- Succeeded by: Odette Ramos

46th President of the Baltimore City Council
- In office 1987–1995
- Preceded by: Clarence H. Burns
- Succeeded by: Lawrence Bell

Member of the Baltimore City Council from the 2nd district
- In office 1975–1983

Personal details
- Born: June 22, 1941 Providence, Rhode Island, U.S.
- Died: November 10, 2024 (aged 83)
- Party: Democratic
- Spouse: Joe Clarke (m. 1964; died 2024)
- Education: Immaculata College (AB); University of Pennsylvania (MA)
- Profession: Teacher

Mary Pat Clarke (June 22, 1941 – November 10, 2024) was an American politician who represented the 14th district in the Baltimore City Council. She served as both council president and council member for 24 out of the last 35 years as of 2010. She is the first woman ever elected president of the Baltimore City Council and until 2016 was the only non-incumbent to win a council seat since single-member districts were mandated by Baltimore voters through Question P in 2002.

Additionally, Clarke unsuccessfully ran for mayor in 1995.

== Early life and education ==
Clarke was born in Providence, Rhode Island, on June 22, 1941. She attended Immaculata College where she received an A.B. in 1963 and an M.A. from the University of Pennsylvania in 1966.

== Career ==
Clarke, by profession, was a teacher. During her career she instructed students at the Johns Hopkins University School of Professional Studies, the Maryland Institute College of Art and the University of Maryland, Baltimore County.

Clarke was a founding board member of the Greater Homewood Community Corporation and later president and executive director. She was instrumental in securing audio equipment for the first performance of Unchained Talent at the Lake Clifton Campus, and she was a funding board member of the non-profit Unchained Talent.

Clarke announced in May 2019 that she would retire from the Baltimore City Council in December 2020. For the 2020 Democratic primary, Clarke endorsed Odette Ramos to succeed her as the council member for the 14th district.

=== In the council ===
As a member of the Baltimore City Council, Clarke was the Chair of the Education Committee, vice-Chair of the Judiciary and Legislative Investigation Committee, a member of the Budget and Appropriations Committee and the Land Use and Transportation Committee (highways & franchises subcommittee). While running for office, Clarke pushed for integrated slates. She and her New Democratic Club forged alliances with Baltimore's black Democratic clubs in the 1970s resulting in the election of several African Americans to the City Council, as well as her own. In the council, she forged alliances with her black colleagues, such as the one with Kweisi Mfume resulting in a Baltimore City mandate for smaller class sizes in the 1980s.

=== 2007 election ===
Clarke faced two low-profile challengers in her 2007 re-election bid: one democrat, Tom Conradt, a University of Baltimore Law School graduate and burgeoning Baltimore political figure, in the primary election and one Republican in the general election.

== Personal life and death ==
Clarke and her husband Joe have four adult children, 2 graduates of the Baltimore City Public School system, and ten grandchildren. Her husband, who was also a teacher, was a developer as well. While out of public office, Clarke served the Mount Saint Agnes Theological Center from 1997 to 1998 by overseeing public relations and working to develop a stable financial base and an expanded curriculum for future students. Joe Clarke died at the age of 83 on February 10, 2024, from complications from a fall at his home.

Clarke died on November 10, 2024, at the age of 83.
