= C. Edward Middlebrooks =

American politician

State Senate District 32
- In office 1995 – January 13, 1999
- Preceded by: Michael J. Wagner
- Succeeded by: James E. DeGrange, Sr.
- Constituency: Anne Arundel County, MD

Personal details
- Born: June 11, 1955 (age 71) Baltimore, MD
- Party: Republican

C. Edward Middlebrooks (born June 11, 1955 in Baltimore, Maryland), is an American politician. Most recently, he was a member of the County Council for District 2 of Anne Arundel County, Maryland. A Republican, he served as the Council's Chairperson until his term ended in December 2010.

== Education ==
Middlebrooks graduated from Glen Burnie High School in Glen Burnie, Maryland. He earned an Associate of Arts degree from Anne Arundel Community College, a Bachelor of Arts degree from the University of Baltimore in 1985 and a Juris Doctor degree from the University of Baltimore in 1988.

== Legal career ==
Middlebrooks is a criminal defense attorney who claims on his web site that he “handles all types of serious crimes, as well as traffic offenses, such as driving with a suspended driver’s license, driving after revocation, driving without insurance, reckless driving, and DUI” and has “successfully defended hundreds of clients facing serious criminal charges.” Middlebrooks is the sole partner in the Glen Burnie law firm known as C. Edward Middlebrooks, P.A..

== Political career ==
Middlebrooks began his political career as a member of the Democratic State Central Committee from 1982 to 1990. This fact has been excised from much of the official state information as his official bios (County Council and Senate) either omit this information or incorrectly claim that he was on the Republican Central Committee. But the archives records it correctly.

Middlebrooks then served as a Democrat on the Anne Arundel County Council for the 2nd District from 1990 to 1994. In 1994, Middlebrooks switched parties to challenge incumbent Senator Michael Wagner for the Dist. 32 state Senate seat. That year was a big year for the Republicans as they swept offices across the country, and almost won the Maryland Governor’s race. Middlebrooks beat Wagner for the senate seat. He was voted chairman of the Anne Arundel County Council in 1997. Then, in 1998, a poor year for Republicans in Maryland, Middlebrooks was challenged by Ed DeGrange. Middlebrooks lost to DeGrange days after an advertisement funded by the committee to support democratic candidate James Ed DeGrange was released. Directly attacking Mr. Middlebrooks, the literature depicted pictures of crying baby faces and accused Mr. Middlebrooks of being a bad role model for children. Due to the amount of time in which the ad was released, the rebuttal advertisement issued by the Committee to support republican candidate Ed Middlebrooks was not delivered before the election. Mr. Middlebrooks also was out of time to file charges of slander against James Ed DeGrange for the literature. In 2002 Mr. Middlebrooks ran again for the Anne Arundel County Council seat and won against Green Party candidate George Law and the incumbent Dan Klosterman after filing a lawsuit against Mr. Klosterman for attempting to redistribute the 1998 literature.

Middlebrooks' brother, Gary Middlebrooks, ran for his brother's seat in the Republican County Council primary in District 2 on Tuesday, September 14, 2010. Gary Middlebrooks lost by 87 votes to his opponent, John Grasso.
