= 1995 Baltimore mayoral election =

- November 7, 1995
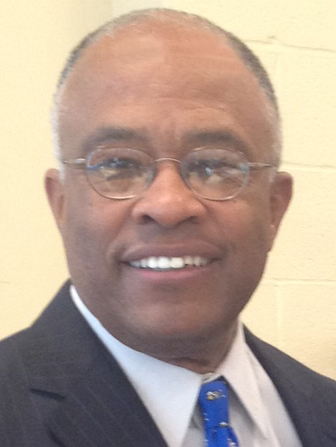

Candidate	Kurt Schmoke	Victor Clarke Jr.
Party	Democratic	Republican
Popular vote	54,804	14,763
Percentage	78.78%	21.22%
Mayor before election
Kurt Schmoke
Democratic
Elected mayor
Kurt Schmoke
Democratic

The 1995 Baltimore mayoral election saw the reelection of incumbent mayor Kurt Schmoke to a third term.

== Nominations ==
Primary elections were held September 12.

=== Democratic primary ===
Democratic primary results
Party	Candidate	Votes	%
Democratic	Kurt Schmoke (incumbent)	96,332	62.10%
Democratic	Mary Pat Clarke	55,955	36.07%
Democratic	Kelley Culver Brohawn	2,827	1.82%
Total votes		155,114	

=== Republican primary ===
Republican primary results
Party	Candidate	Votes	%
Republican	Victor Clarke Jr.	4,391	63.37%
Republican	S. Scott McCown	1,339	19.33%
Republican	Arthur W. Cuffie Jr.	1,199	17.30%
Total votes		6,929	

== General election ==
The general election was held November 7.

Baltimore mayoral general election, 1995
Party	Candidate	Votes	%
Democratic	Kurt Schmoke (incumbent)	54,804	78.78%
Republican	Victor Clarke Jr.	14,763	21.22%
Total votes		69,567	
Democratic hold			
