= American Joe Miedusiewski =

American politician (born 1949)

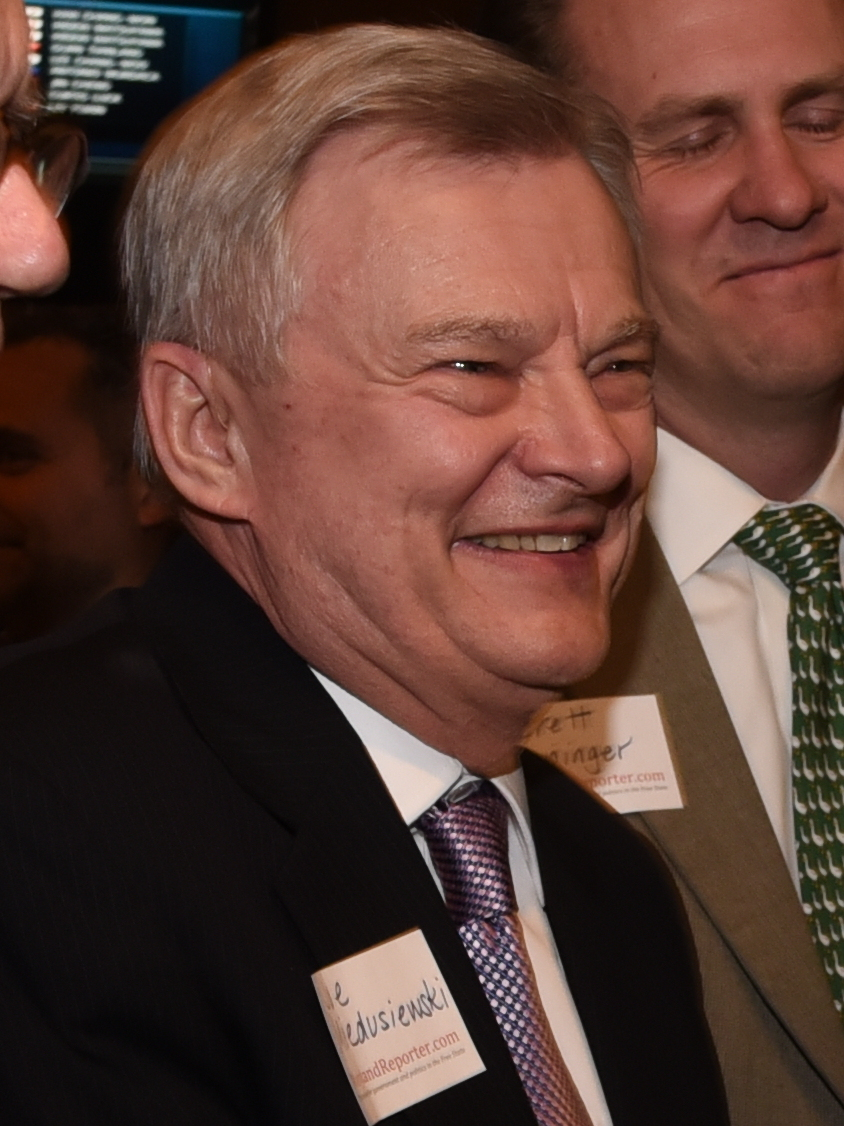
- Miedusiewski in 2018

Member of the Maryland Senate from the 46th district
- In office November 16, 1988 – January 11, 1995
- Appointed by: William Donald Schaefer
- Preceded by: Joseph S. Bovegna
- Succeeded by: Perry Sfikas

Member of the Maryland House of Delegates
- In office January 8, 1975 – November 16, 1988 Serving with Cornell N. Dypski, Anthony M. DiPietro Jr.
- Preceded by: District established
- Succeeded by: Donald G. Hammen
- Constituency: 47th district (1975–1983); 46th district (1983–1989)

Personal details
- Born: Joseph Francis Miedusiewski; October 17, 1949 (age 76) Baltimore, Maryland, U.S.
- Party: Democratic
- Spouse: Patricia
- Education: University of Baltimore (BA)

Military service
- Branch/service: Maryland Air National Guard
- Years of service: 1969-1975
- Rank: Sergeant
- Unit: 175th Tactical Fighter Group

American Joe Miedusiewski (med-ah-SHEV-skee; born Joseph Francis Miedusiewski; October 17, 1949) is an American politician who served as a member of the Maryland Senate from 1989 to 1995, and the Maryland House of Delegates from 1975 to 1989. A member of the Democratic Party, he unsuccessfully ran for Governor of Maryland in 1994, placing second behind Prince George's County Executive Parris Glendening in the Democratic primary.

== Early life and education ==
Miedusiewski was born in Baltimore on October 17, 1949, to father Francis Joseph Miedusiewski, who unsuccessfully ran for the Maryland House of Delegates in 1970. His grandfather, Josef Mioduszewski (anglicized to Joseph Francis Miedusiewski), migrated to the United States from Poland in 1909, and operated several small businesses, including American Joe's Tavern, in Baltimore. He graduated from parochial schools in Baltimore, including Calvert Hall College High School, and later received a Bachelor of Arts degree from the University of Baltimore.

Miedusiewski changed his name to American Joe before running for the Maryland House of Delegates in 1974, so that voters would associate him with his grandfather's tavern.

== Political career ==
=== Maryland General Assembly ===
In the Maryland General Assembly, Miedusiewski gained a reputation for keeping a low profile and having a pro-labor and pro-business voting record. His district spanned from the Dundalk peninsula to east Baltimore, down to the Chesapeake Bay, and was regarded as having a largely blue-collar constituency. Miedusiewski rose to national prominence after then-presidential candidate Bill Clinton played pool at American Joe's Tavern while campaigning in Baltimore in 1992.

Miedusiewski was elected to the Maryland House of Delegates in 1974, and was sworn in on January 8, 1975. He served as a member of the Constitutional and Administrative Law Committee during his entire tenure. Miedusiewski was sworn in to the Maryland Senate following the death of state Senator Joseph Bonvegna on November 16, 1988, where he served on the Economic and Environmental Affairs Committee during his entire tenure.

=== 1994 Maryland gubernatorial campaign ===
On November 17, 1993, Miedusiewski announced that he would run for Governor of Maryland in 1994, seeking to succeed term-limited Governor William Donald Schaefer, whom had encouraged him to run. He sought support from moderate-to-conservative Democrats and ran on a platform including economic issues, reducing government, and increased policing and sentencing. In June 1994, Miedusiewski named state Senator Bernie Fowler as his running mate.

Miedusiewski trailed in polling behind Prince George's County Executive Parris Glendening, placing third behind "Undecided" and Glendening in a Mason-Dixon poll ahead of the Democratic primary election. He was defeated in the Democratic primary election by Glendening, placing second with 18 percent of the vote. Miedusiewski later endorsed Glendening in the general election.

Following his defeat, Miedusiewski worked as a lobbyist for Semmes, Bowen & Semmes and Old Line Government Affairs.

== Personal life ==
Miedusiewski's wife, Patricia, worked as a nurse. Together, they live in the Canton neighborhood of Baltimore.

== Electoral history ==
Maryland House of Delegates District 47 election, 1974
Party	Candidate	Votes	%
Democratic	Raymond A. Dypski	9,733	34.3
Democratic	American Joe Miedusiewski	9,633	34.0
Democratic	Elmer Elmo Waters	8,989	31.7

Maryland House of Delegates District 47 election, 1978
Party	Candidate	Votes	%
Democratic	American Joe Miedusiewski	11,503	32.8
Democratic	Raymond A. Dypski	11,369	32.4
Democratic	James R. Dietrich	10,805	30.8
Republican	Charles H. Howe	1,427	4.1

Maryland House of Delegates District 46 election, 1982
Party	Candidate	Votes	%
Democratic	Anthony M. DiPietro Jr.	17,948	33.5
Democratic	Raymond A. Dypski	17,789	33.2
Democratic	American Joe Miedusiewski	17,777	33.2

Maryland House of Delegates District 46 election, 1986
Party	Candidate	Votes	%
Democratic	American Joe Miedusiewski	15,521	33.7
Democratic	Anthony M. DiPietro Jr.	15,467	33.5
Democratic	Cornell N. Dypski	15,119	32.8

Maryland Senate District 46 election, 1990
Party	Candidate	Votes	%
Democratic	American Joe Miedusiewski	10,037	100.0

Maryland gubernatorial Democratic primary election, 1994
Party	Candidate	Votes	%
Democratic	Parris Glendening	293,314	53.6
Democratic	American Joe Miedusiewski	100,296	18.3
Democratic	Melvin Steinberg	82,308	15.0
Democratic	Mary H. Boergers	46,888	8.6
Democratic	Don Allensworth	15,680	2.9
Democratic	Walter Gilcrist Finch	5,369	1.0
Democratic	Lawrence K. Freeman	3,518	0.6
