= John A. Cade =

American politician

John A. Cade (Jack)

Member of the Maryland Senate from the 33rd district
- In office January 13, 1975 – November 14, 1996
- Succeeded by: Robert R. Neall

Personal details
- Born: John Arnold Cade; July 2, 1929 Charleston, South Carolina
- Died: November 14, 1996 (aged 67) Ocean City, Maryland
- Party: Republican
- Spouse: Shirley Cade
- Profession: business manager- engineer- realtor

John Arnold Cade (July 2, 1929 – November 14, 1996) was a Republican State Senator from District 33 in the U.S. state of Maryland.

== Background ==
Cade was first elected to office in 1975 to represent District 33, which covers a portion of Anne Arundel County, Maryland. He had little difficulty getting reelected as he maintained his seat in the Senate for over 20 years.

In 1986, Cade was unchallenged in the primary election and defeated Robert J. Cancelliere with 68% of the vote in the general election. In 1990, he was again unchallenged in the Republican primary election, and this time, was also unchallenged in the general election.

Cade saw much of the same in 1994 when he was not challenged in the Republican primary election, nor was he challenged in the general election.

In 1996, Cade died while in Ocean City, Maryland. Former Maryland Governor Parris Glendening swore in Robert R. Neall on December 17, 1996, to replace Cade. Neall was elected in a special election in November 1996 after he switched his party affiliation from Republican to Democrat.

== Education ==
Cade attended Kentucky and Ohio parochial schools while growing up. He graduated from Xavier University in 1953 with his B.S. degree. He received his M.B.A. from Northwestern University a year later in 1954. He completed 2 years of law school at Chase College and the University of Maryland. Finally, he graduated from the Graduate Realtor's Institute (G.R.I.) to become a real estate agent.

== Career ==
After high school, Cade served in U.S. Marine Corps from 1946 until 1948 and again from 1950 until 1951. After serving in the military, he started his career as a professional business and real estate consultant.

While in the State Senate, Cade was the Minority Leader from 1984 until 1996 and the minority whip from 1982 until 1983. He also served as the chair of the Anne Arundel County Delegation. Cade was selected as a delegate to the Republican Party National Convention. He also received the Distinguished Service Award from the Glen Burnie Jaycees in 1963.

In 1998, the Maryland General Assembly dedicated a portion of Interstate 97 in Anne Arundel County to Senator Cade (Joint Resolution no. 7, Acts of 1998). It is known as the Senator John A. Cade Memorial Highway.

A fellowship was created in honor of Senator Cade named the Senator John A. Cade Overseas Fellowship, which allows Maryland community college professors to teach overseas for the University of Maryland University College.

Senator Cade also has a state education formula named after him, the John A. Cade Funding Formula (Education Article, §§11-105(c) and 16-305).

At Anne Arundel Community College, located in the Arnold campus, a building housing most of the school's art department was named for him as the Cade Center for Fine Arts.
