= Mary H. Boergers =

American politician (born 1946)

Member of the Maryland Senate from the 17th district
- In office January 9, 1991 – January 11, 1995
- Preceded by: S. Frank Shore
- Succeeded by: Jennie M. Forehand

Member of the Maryland House of Delegates from the 17th district
- In office 1983 – January 9, 1991 Serving with Jennie M. Forehand and Michael R. Gordon
- Preceded by: new district
- Succeeded by: Kumar P. Barve

Member of the Maryland House of Delegates from the 18th district
- In office 1981–1982 Serving with Donald B. Robertson and Patricia R. Sher
- Preceded by: David L. Scull
- Succeeded by: new district

Personal details
- Born: Mary Helen Lang; February 10, 1946 (age 80) Hartford, Connecticut, U.S.
- Party: Democratic
- Spouse: David Paul Boergers (m. 1971)
- Children: 2
- Education: College of St. Catherine (BA); Catholic University of America (MA)
- Occupation: Educator; politician

Mary Helen Boergers (née Lang; born February 10, 1946) is an American politician and educator. She was appointed to a seat on the Maryland House of Delegates in 1981, and served until 1990, when she won election to the Maryland Senate. During Boergers's political career, she represented the 17th and 18th districts of Maryland. She was highly involved in Maryland politics, especially concerned with issues of education, drugs and crime, environment, labor, and women's concerns.

== Early life and education ==
Mary Helen Lang was born in Hartford, Connecticut, on February 10, 1946. Her mother was a high school teacher and her father was an auditor for an insurance company. Her family later moved to Minneapolis, Minnesota.

She attended the College of St. Catherine in St. Paul, Minnesota and graduated with her Bachelors of Arts in 1968. After graduating, she moved to Washington, D.C. to attend Catholic University of America, earning a Masters of Arts in American History in 1970.

== Personal life ==
She married David Paul Boergers on June 25, 1971. They have two children.

== Career ==
Boergers taught high school history at Rockville High School in Montgomery County, Maryland. She later was a lobbyist for the National Organization for Women and fund raised for Rep. Michael Barnes. Boergers continued to engage herself in politics, particularly in the areas of education, drugs and crime, environment, labor, and women's concerns.

In 1981, Boergers was appointed to the Maryland House of Delegates, representing the 18th district. She replaced David L. Scull who resigned from the role. She was a member of the Ways and Means Committee (1981-1988), House of Delegates (1983-1990), and the Economic Matters Committee (1988-1990). She was the president of Women Legislators of Maryland from 1990 to 1991.

In 1990, Boergers was elected to the Maryland Senate seat representing 17th district and served from 1991 to 1994. She ran on a pro-choice platform against a pro-life candidate.

Boergers ran for Governor of Maryland in 1994. Her running mate was Barbara Osborn Kreamer; they were the first all-female top ticket in Maryland. Boergers received 9% of the democratic primary votes, losing the primary election to the later elected Parris Glendening.
