= Parris Glendening =

American politician

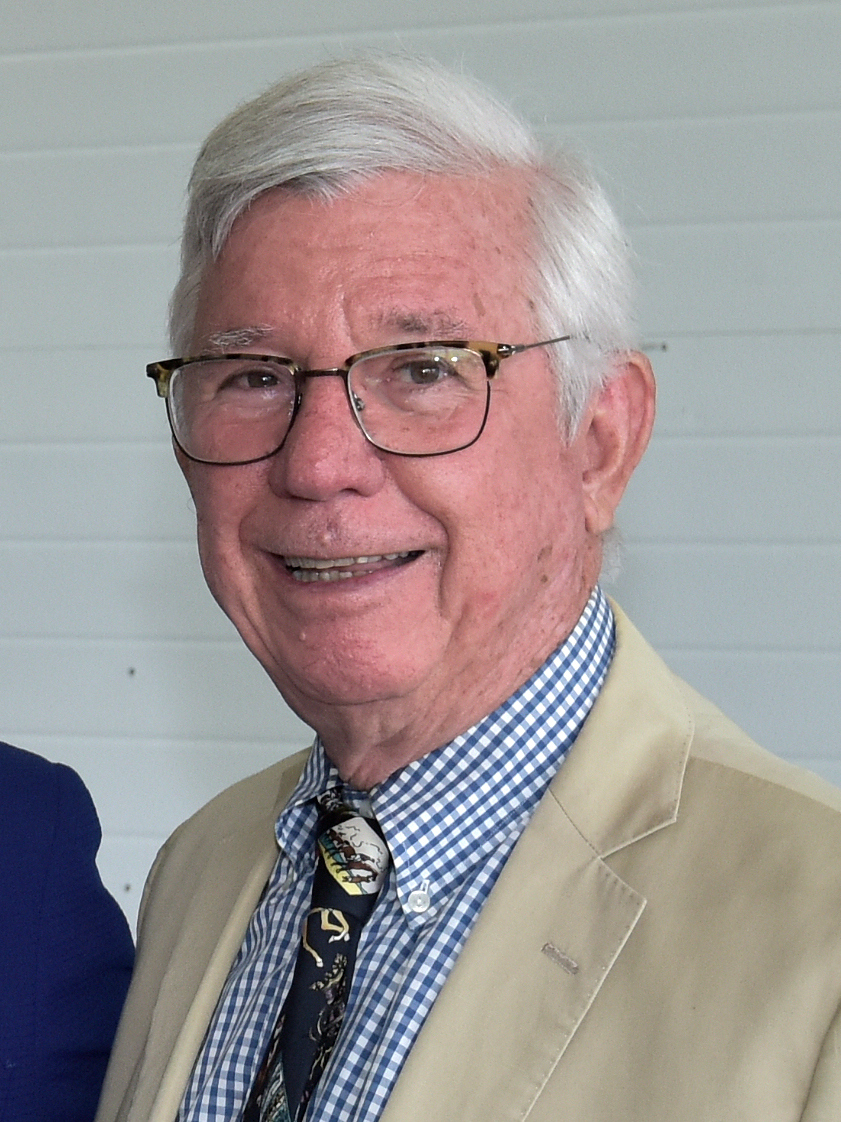

Chair of the National Governors Association
- In office July 11, 2000 – August 7, 2001
- Preceded by: Mike Leavitt
- Succeeded by: John Engler

59th Governor of Maryland
- In office January 18, 1995 – January 15, 2003
- Lieutenant: Kathleen Kennedy Townsend
- Preceded by: William Donald Schaefer
- Succeeded by: Bob Ehrlich

4th Executive of Prince George's County
- In office 1983–1994
- Preceded by: Lawrence Hogan
- Succeeded by: Wayne K. Curry

Personal details
- Born: Parris Nelson Glendening; June 11, 1942 (age 84) New York City, New York, U.S.
- Party: Democratic
- Spouse(s): Lynne Shaw (divorced 1970s) Frances Hughes (m. 1976; div. 2001) Jennifer Crawford (m. 2002)
- Education: Broward College (attended); Florida State University (BA, MA, PhD)
- Glendening's voice Glendening welcoming President Bill Clinton to the Maryland General Assembly. Recorded February 10, 1997

Parris Nelson Glendening (born June 11, 1942) is an American politician and academic who served as the 59th governor of Maryland from 1995 to 2003. He previously served as the county executive of Prince George's County, Maryland from 1982 to 1994 as a member of the Democratic Party. In 1999, Glendening was elected as a fellow of the National Academy of Public Administration.

== Early life, education, and academic career ==
Glendening was born in The Bronx, New York City, but later in his youth moved to the state of Florida. Raised Catholic, he attended St. Thomas Aquinas High School in Fort Lauderdale. He won a financial scholarship to Broward Community College.

Other financial aid later enabled him to attend the Florida State University, where he received a bachelor's degree (1964), a master's degree (1965), and a PhD (1967), becoming the youngest student in FSU history to receive a doctorate in political science.

After he graduated, he taught government and politics as a professor at the University of Maryland at College Park for 27 years. In 1977, he co-authored Pragmatic Federalism: An Intergovernmental View of American Government with Mavis Mann Reeves.

== Local politics ==
Glendening's career in public service began in 1973 as a city councilman in the Washington, D.C., suburb of Hyattsville, Maryland. He was elected to the county council of Prince George's County, Maryland, in 1974 and twice served as the council chairman. In 1982, he was elected as the county executive of Prince George's county, eventually becoming the first county executive in Maryland history to be elected to three terms (1982–94). Under Glendening's leadership, Prince George's county was selected as an "All America County" by the National Civic League, and City and State Magazine named him the "most valuable county official" in the nation. He and his top aides stood to benefit from a controversial Prince George's county supplemental retirement plan that was not widely disclosed by the press until after he was elected governor in an extremely close contest.

== Governor of Maryland ==
=== Elections ===
Glendening was elected to his first term as governor of Maryland, edging out Ellen Sauerbrey, the Republican nominee, by 5,993 votes. Sauerbrey challenged the result in Maryland circuit court claiming that widespread voting by dead people occurred in the African American community. No evidence of ballots cast in the names of dead voters was introduced in court. On the eve of the trial, Sauerbrey's attorneys talked of 89 such votes, but checking by reporters found no such ballots. Judge Raymond G. Thieme Jr. ruled against Sauerbrey's claim and certified Glendening's win. Glendening became the first Maryland governor elected from the Washington, D.C., metropolitan region since Oden Bowie was elected in 1867. In 1998, Glendening won re-election to a second term, again defeating Sauerbrey, this time 55% to 45%.

=== Tenure ===
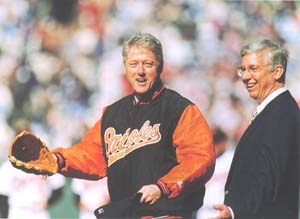
Glendening with President Bill Clinton at Oriole Park in April 1996

Glendening's early administration was marked by higher education investment, environmental protection, tax reform and economic development. From 1994 to 1998, he cut or lowered more than 50 Maryland taxes, including the state personal income tax. By the end of his first term, Maryland's national rank in job creation had moved from 43rd to 14th. Glendening's job creation efforts focused mainly on biotechnology. Seeking to make Maryland a world leader in this area, Glendening successfully recruited companies such as Human Genome Sciences, Gallow Lab, and Qiagen to Maryland. As of June 2014, Maryland was home to the second-largest biotech cluster per capita in the U.S.

Glendening also assisted in successfully bringing the National Football League teams Washington Redskins from Robert F. Kennedy Stadium in the neighboring District of Columbia (Washington, D.C.) who now play in a new stadium in Landover, with then owner Jack Kent Cooke, and the relocated franchise Baltimore Ravens, from Cleveland, Ohio, as the former Cleveland Browns with owner Art Modell to play in Baltimore after two years in a new stadium as part of the sports complex at Camden Yards, west of the redeveloped Inner Harbor. Glendening personally negotiated the relocation agreements with both owners and then undertook a politically heated battle against members of his own party – led by state senator Chris Van Hollen (future representative and senator) – to build the teams' new stadiums and pay for the needed road improvements and public works infrastructure.

During Glendening's second term, serious ongoing environmental issues concerning the Chesapeake Bay and the overdevelopment of rural areas increased his focus on issues of growth and environmental stewardship. Glendening is widely recognized as a pioneer in land development issues and is credited for coining the phrase "Smart Growth."

In 2001, Maryland legislators passed a bill that Glendening had promoted for the previous two years banning discrimination on the basis of sexual orientation. Glendening signed the bill.

Though overseeing the executions of Flint Gregory Hunt in 1997 and Tyrone Delano Gilliam Jr. in 1998, Glendening halted executions in Maryland by an executive order on May 9, 2002. Glendening's successor, Robert Ehrlich, lifted the ban during his term in office. The ban was re-instituted by Ehrlich's successor, former Baltimore mayor, Martin O'Malley, who eventually signed a bill in 2013 ending Maryland's use of capital punishment. During the 2002 Maryland gubernatorial election, Glendening was not eligible to run due to the state constitutional term limit. His lieutenant governor, Kathleen Kennedy Townsend, was nominated by the Democrats to run. Townsend was damaged during the election due to wide criticism by rural voters, especially farmers, directed at Glendening for what they considered overzealous environmental legislation aimed at preventing rain runoff of pollutants from farm soils into tributaries of the Chesapeake Bay, that significantly raised the cost of participating in agribusiness.

Townsend lost the election, 48%–52%, to the Republican U.S. representative Robert Ehrlich of Arbutus. Ehrlich ran an inclusive campaign focusing on his bipartisan work in Congress and his pro-choice stance on abortion and moderate voting record. His efforts resulted in record voter turnout in Maryland's rural and suburban counties. At the same time, Townsend's campaign was plagued with missteps emblematic of which was her unpopular lieutenant governor choice, retired admiral Charles R. Larson, who had never been involved in politics and had changed parties only weeks before. Townsend's selection of Larson, which she made without consulting the Democratic leaders in the state, was a point of controversy in the campaign. Ehrlich was victorious in November 2002, taking office in the Maryland State House in Annapolis in January 2003.

== Post political career ==
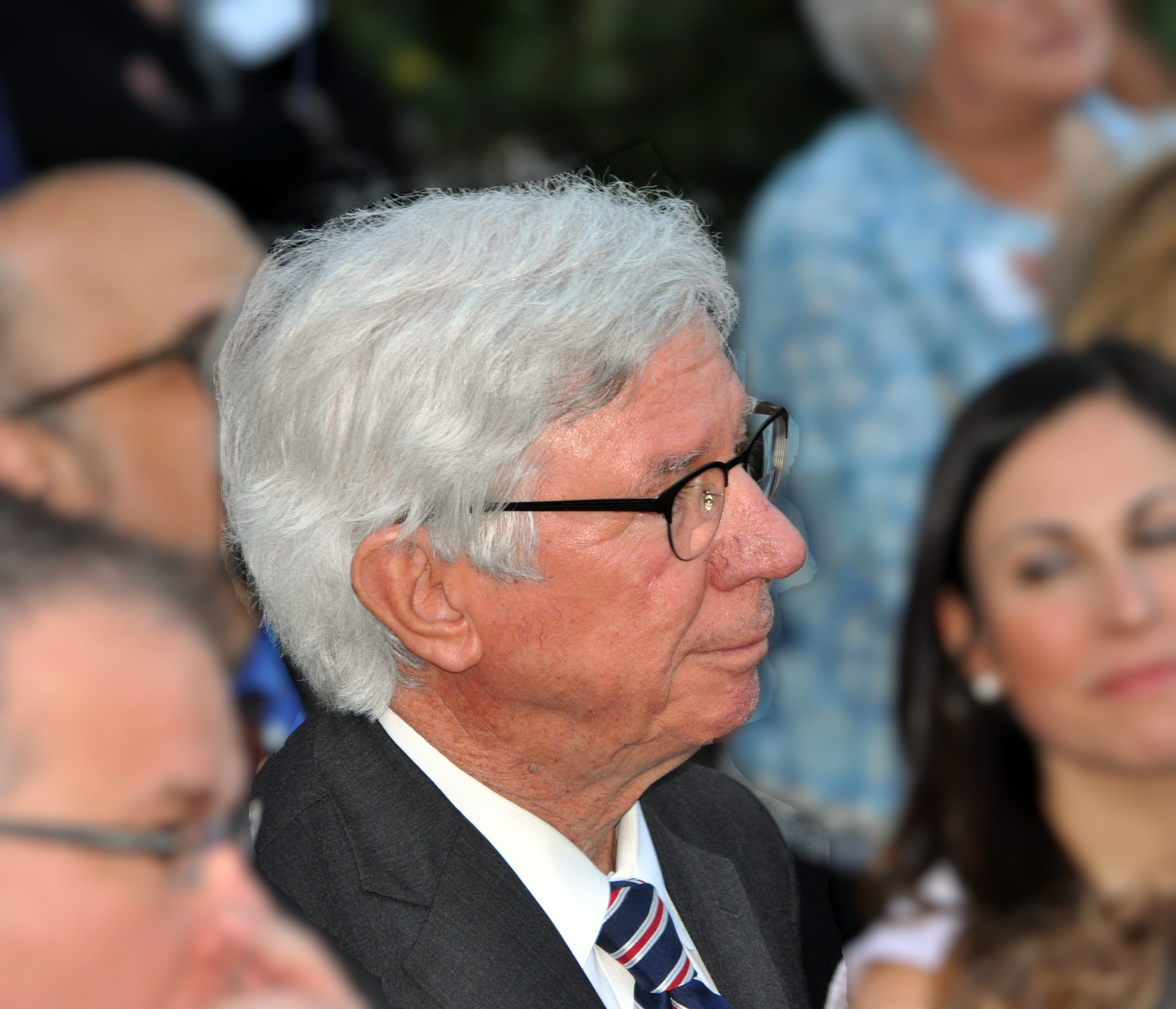
Glendening in 2017

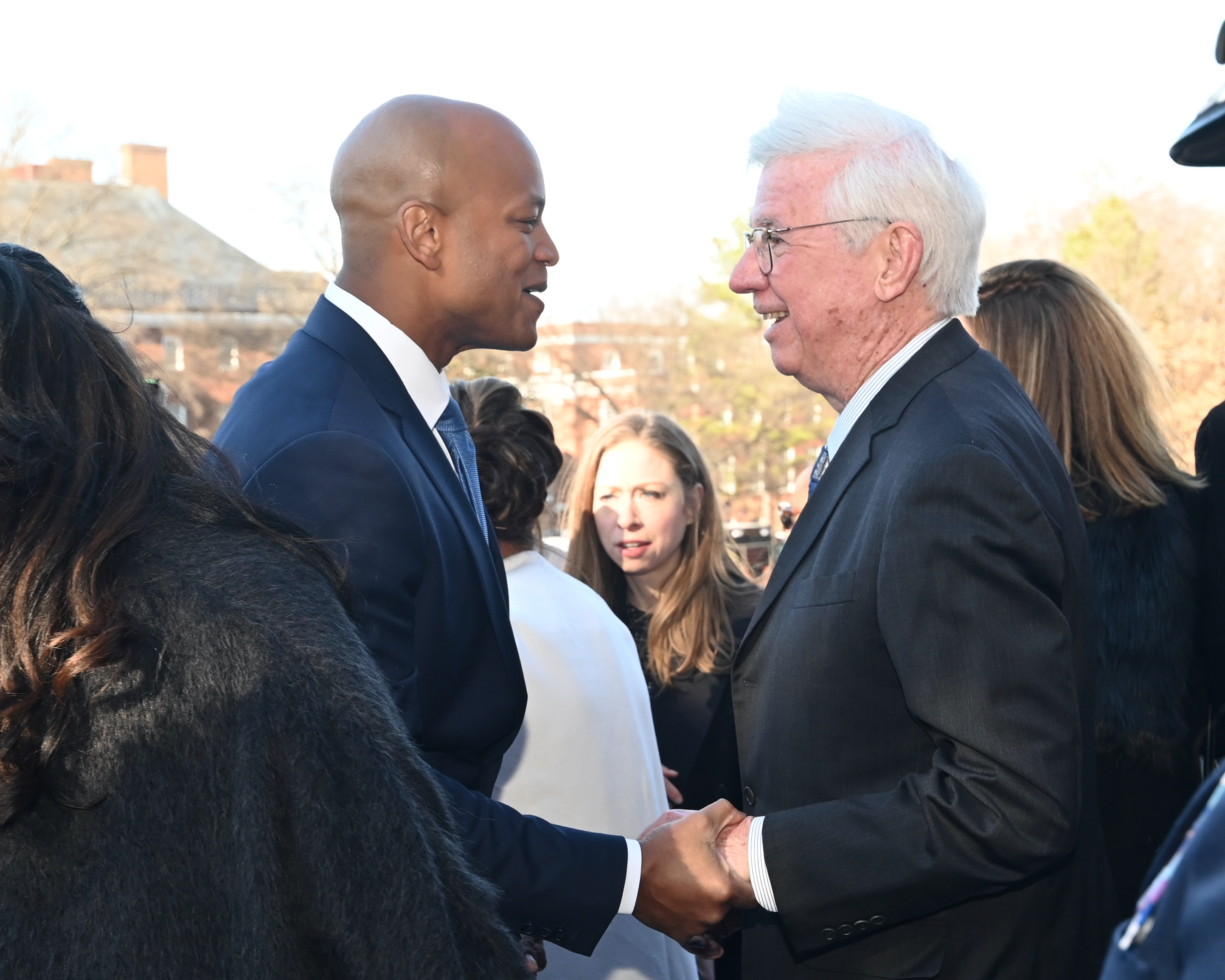
Glendening with Governor Wes Moore in 2023

Glendening left office on January 15, 2003, with low approval ratings, and he largely stayed out of the limelight. He and his successor, Robert Ehrlich, informally agreed not to criticize one another. Glendening quietly continued his advocacy work for Smart Growth.

Glendening broke his three-and-a-half-year silence in late August 2006, when he endorsed Kweisi Mfume for the U.S. Senate. Mfume eventually lost the Democratic primary to Representative Ben Cardin, who went on to win the Senate seat replacing longtime incumbent Paul Sarbanes.

Glendening did not attend the inauguration of governor Martin O'Malley on January 17, 2007 because he was out of town on a pre-planned speaking engagement.

== Personal life ==
Glendening and his first wife, Lynne Shaw, divorced in the 1970s. On November 19, 2001, Glendening divorced Frances Hughes Glendening after almost twenty-five years of marriage. The couple has a son, Raymond.

He married Jennifer E. Crawford, his third wife, on January 25, 2002. At the time of their marriage, Crawford was 35 and Glendening was 59. She was also his chief of staff – earning $103,000 a year – and they began their relationship while Glendening was still married. They have a daughter, Gabrielle, born in August 2002. It was the first time since 1879 that a Maryland governor had a baby born during his term of office.

Glendening's brother, Bruce, died of AIDS in 1992.

Glendening regards University Park, Maryland, as his hometown, near the University of Maryland at College Park campus.

== Electoral history ==
Maryland Gubernatorial Election, 1998
Party	Candidate	Votes	%
Democratic	Parris Glendening (incumbent)	846,972	55.14
Republican	Ellen Sauerbrey	688,357	44.82

Maryland Gubernatorial Election, 1994
Party	Candidate	Votes	%
Democratic	Parris Glendening	708,094	50.21
Republican	Ellen Sauerbrey	702,101	49.78

Maryland Gubernatorial Election, 1994 – Democratic Primary
Party	Candidate	Votes	%
Democratic	Parris Glendening	293,314	53.59
Democratic	American Joe Miedusiewski	100,296	18.32
Democratic	Melvin Steinberg	82,308	15.04
Democratic	Mary Boergers	46,888	8.57
Democratic	Don Allensworth	15,680	2.87
Democratic	Walter Gilchrist Finch	5,369	0.98

Political offices
Preceded by Lawrence Hogan	Executive of Prince George's County; 1983–1994	Succeeded by Wayne K. Curry
Preceded by William Donald Schaefer	Governor of Maryland; 1995–2003	Succeeded by Bob Ehrlich
Preceded by Mike Leavitt	Chair of the National Governors Association; 2000–2001	Succeeded by John Engler
Party political offices
Preceded by William Donald Schaefer	Democratic nominee for Governor of Maryland; 1994, 1998	Succeeded by Kathleen Kennedy Townsend
Preceded by Gray Davis	Chair of the Democratic Governors Association; 2001–2002	Succeeded by Gary Locke
U.S. order of precedence (ceremonial)
Preceded by Martha McSally as Former U.S. Senator	Order of precedence of the United States; Within Maryland	Succeeded by Bob Ehrlich as Former Governor
Preceded by Charlie Baker as Former Governor	Order of precedence of the United States; Outside Maryland	Succeeded by Bob Ehrlich as Former Governor
