= Bernie Fowler =

American politician (1924–2021)

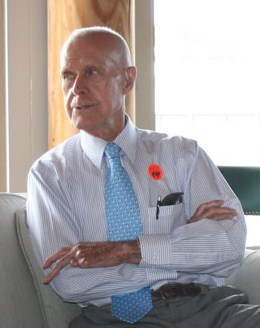

Member of the Maryland Senate from the 29th district
- In office 1983–1994

County Commissioner of Calvert County
- In office 1970–1982

Personal details
- Born: March 30, 1924 Baltimore, Maryland, U.S.
- Died: December 12, 2021 (aged 97) Dares Beach, Maryland, U.S.
- Party: Democratic

Military service
- Allegiance: United States
- Branch/service: United States Navy
- Years of service: 1944–1946
- Battles/wars: World War II

Clyde Bernard Fowler (March 30, 1924 – December 12, 2021) was an American politician from Maryland. He was a Calvert County Commissioner from 1970 to 1982, and served in the Maryland Senate between 1983 and 1994. Fowler is best known for his advocacy for the cleanup of the Patuxent River, the largest river to be found entirely within the State of Maryland.

== Personal life ==
As a child, Fowler grew up in Broomes Island, Maryland, where he enjoyed running and soft-crabbing. Fowler enlisted in the U.S. Navy during the Second World War. Following the war, Fowler married and established a rowboat business on Broomes Island using a $4,000 G.I. Bill loan. Fowler had four children.

== Political career ==
Prior to being elected to public office, Fowler was an avid fisherman who would wade into the Patuxent River and make note of the clarity of the water. Fowler served as a member of the Calvert County Board of Education from 1963 to 1969. After noticing the clarity of the water slowly diminishing, Fowler chose to run for Calvert County Commissioner in 1970 and make the health of the Patuxent River, as well as improving schools, a key issue. After serving over a decade as county commissioner, Fowler was elected to the Maryland Senate, where he remained until his retirement from public office in the mid 1990s.

Fowler, as an early-1970s Calvert County Commissioner, led the way in a lawsuit filed by downriver Charles, Calvert and St. Mary's counties against upriver counties. The lawsuit forced the state, the upriver counties, and the U.S. Environmental Protection Agency to enact pollution control measures. The 1985 total of 200,000 tons of sediment reaching the Chesapeake Bay annually was reduced to 130,000 by 2004. The Patuxent River is a rarity among Chesapeake watersheds in that most of its harmful phosphorus and nitrogen nutrient overloads come from its ever-increasing areas of urban runoff, and less from its other two largest contributors, point sources (industrial, sewage, etc.) and the declining agricultural areas.

Each June at Jefferson Patterson Park & Museum, Fowler held a "wade-in" into the Patuxent River at Jefferson Patterson Park & Museum, where he and others would walk into the waters of the Patuxent River until their feet were no longer visible. The event was previously held at Broomes Island, but was institutionalized at JPPM in 2010. Fowler did the annual tradition in order to bring awareness to the water clarity levels of the Patuxent River. In recent years, the "wade-in" has become a noteworthy public event, with numerous public officials joining Fowler in the walk, including Maryland Governors Martin O'Malley and Robert Ehrlich, Democratic Party congressman Steny Hoyer and U.S Senator Barbara Mikulski. The "wade-in" has been an annual tradition since 1988.

In 1994, Fowler was named as the candidate for Maryland lieutenant governor under State Senator American Joe Miedusiewski during the 1994 Democratic primary gubernatorial election. (However, the party's nomination and eventually the governor's seat would go to Parris Glendening that year.)

== Death ==
Fowler lived in the community of Dares Beach, Maryland near Prince Frederick, Maryland. He died on December 12, 2021, at the age of 97.

== Legacy ==
In 1997, U.S. EPA Administrator Carol Browner declared "Bernie Fowler Day" in recognition of Fowler's lifelong efforts to clean up the Patuxent River.

In 1998, a laboratory building at Chesapeake Biological Laboratory in Solomons, Maryland was dedicated in Bernie Fowler's honor.

Fowler's "wade-in" has been an annual tradition since 1988.

== Sources ==
Martin, Sandra (June 11–17, 1998), "Bernie's Big Day", New Bay Times, vol. VI Number 23, New Bay Enterprises, archived from the original on September 28, 2007

Horton, Tom (1987). Bay Country : Reflections on the Chesapeake. Baltimore, Maryland: Johns Hopkins University Press. ISBN 0-89919-837-6.
