= Nathan Irby =

American politician (1931–2026)

Member of the Maryland Senate from the 45th district
- In office 1982–1995
- Preceded by: Robert L. Douglass
- Succeeded by: Nathaniel J. McFadden

Personal details
- Born: November 7, 1931 Baltimore, Maryland, U.S.
- Died: June 4, 2026 (aged 94) Baltimore, Maryland, U.S.
- Party: Democratic

Nathan C. Irby (November 7, 1931 – June 4, 2026) was an American politician in the state of Maryland. He served in the Maryland State Senate as a Democrat from the 45th district from 1982 to 1995. Irby was born on November 7, 1931, and died on June 4, 2026, at the age of 94.
