= Leo E. Green =

American politician (born 1932)

Leo Green

Member of the Maryland Senate from the 23rd district
- In office January 12, 1983 – January 10, 2007
- Preceded by: Thomas P. O'Reilly (redistricted)
- Succeeded by: Douglas J. J. Peters

Personal details
- Born: March 27, 1932 (age 94) Mount Cuba, Delaware, U.S.
- Party: Democratic
- Spouse: Alhen
- Children: nine, including Collin P. Green
- Education: Mount St. Mary's College, Georgetown University School of Law
- Profession: attorney

Military service
- Branch/service: United States Army
- Battles/wars: Korean War

Leo E. Green (born March 27, 1932) is an American politician in the state of Maryland. He served in the Maryland State Senate from 1983 to 2007 as a Democrat. Green attended Mount St. Mary's College and Georgetown University School of Law and is an attorney. He also served as mayor of Bowie, Maryland from 1968 to 1972.
