= Charles H. Smelser =

American politician

Member of the Maryland Senate from the 4th district
- In office 1967 – January 11, 1995
- Succeeded by: Timothy R. Ferguson

Member of the Maryland House of Delegates
- In office 1955–1963

Personal details
- Born: July 4, 1920 Uniontown, Maryland, U.S.
- Died: January 29, 2009 (aged 88) Union Bridge, Maryland, U.S.
- Party: Democratic
- Education: University of Maryland, College Park (BS)
- Military career
- Allegiance: United States
- Branch: U.S. Army Air Forces
- Conflicts: World War II
- Awards: Distinguished Flying Cross

Charles H. Smelser (July 4, 1920 – January 29, 2009) was a Democratic State Senator and Delegate in Maryland.

== Background ==
Smelser was first elected to the Maryland House of Delegates in 1955. He served in the House until 1963. In 1967, he was elected to the Maryland State Senate, where he served until 1995, a Senate career of 28 years.

== Education ==
Smelser attended Carroll County public schools. He graduated from New Windsor High School in 1937. He received a Bachelor of Science from the University of Maryland, College Park in 1942. At Maryland he was a member of Alpha Tau Omega fraternity.

== Career ==
After graduating from college, Smelser served in the United States Army Air Force during World War II. He was a pilot who flew 35 bombing missions from England in B-17's. He was awarded the Distinguished Flying Cross and Air Medal with 5 Oak clusters.

In addition to his political work and his military career, he was also a dairy farmer and in 1958 served as Director and later President of the New Windsor State Bank. He retired from this position in 1997.

In the Maryland Senate, Smelser was a member of several committees including but not limited to the Budget and Taxation Committee, the Executive Nominations Committee, the Rules Committee, the Legislative Policy Committee, the Joint Committee on Administrative, and Executive and Legislative Review. Additionally, he was the Senate Chair of the Joint Subcommittee on State's Capital Program. Smelser retired from politics in 1995.

== Election results ==
- 1990 Primary Race for Maryland State Senate – District 4

Name	Votes	Percent	Outcome
Charles H. Smelser, Dem.	18,023	100%	Won

- 1986 Race for Maryland State Senate – District 4

Name	Votes	Percent	Outcome
Charles H. Smelser, Dem.	12,673	56%	Won
John Thompson, Rep.	9,805	44%	Lost
