= Thomas V. Miller Jr. =

American politician (1942–2021)

Mike Miller
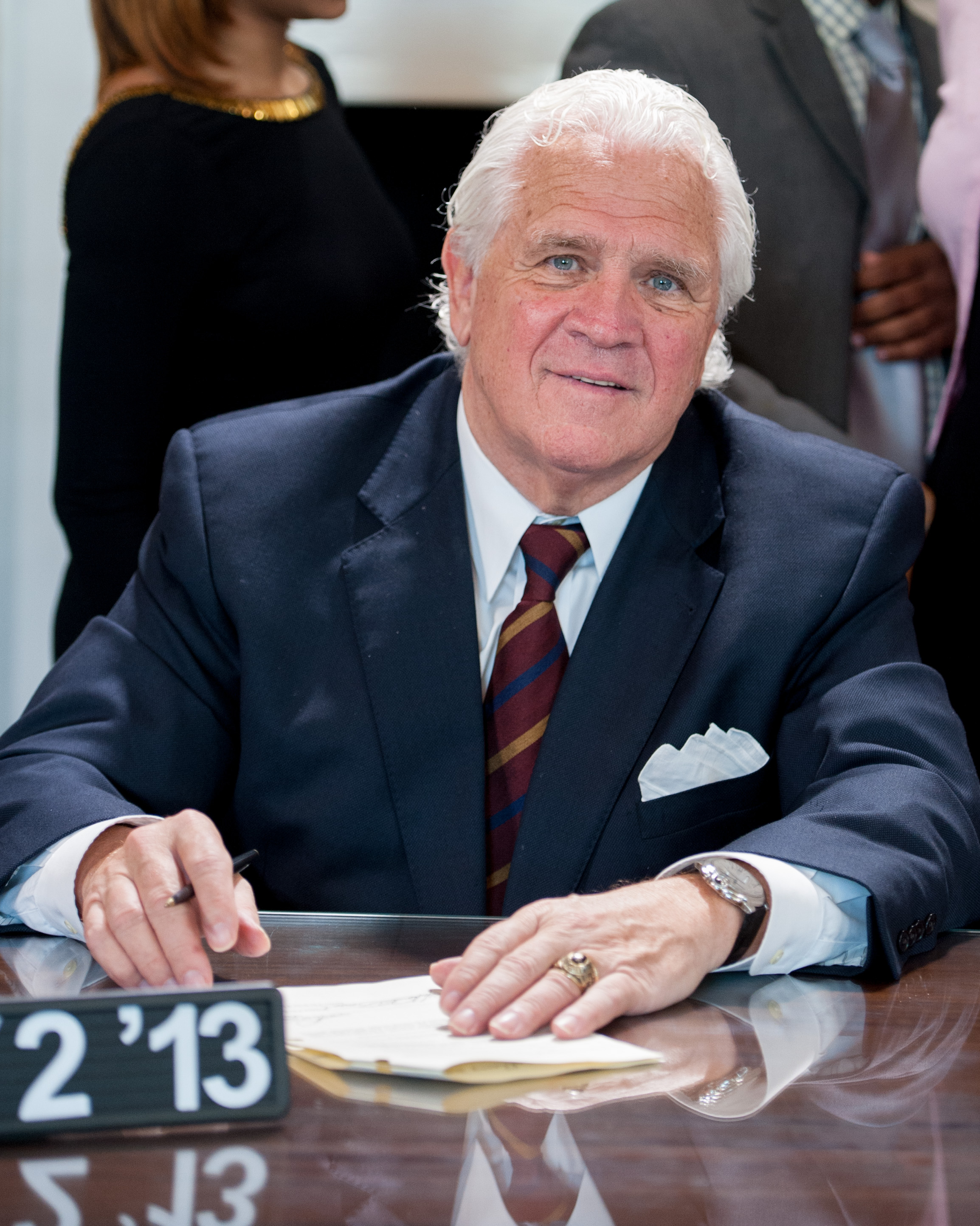
- Miller in 2013

85th President of the Maryland Senate
- In office January 21, 1987 – January 8, 2020
- Preceded by: Melvin Steinberg
- Succeeded by: Bill Ferguson

Member of the Maryland Senate
- In office January 8, 1975 – December 23, 2020
- Preceded by: Constituency established
- Succeeded by: Michael A. Jackson
- Constituency: 28th district (1975–1983); 27th district (1983–2020)

Member of the Maryland House of Delegates from the Prince George's County 3rd district
- In office January 13, 1971 – January 8, 1975
- Preceded by: Multi-member district
- Succeeded by: Constituency abolished

Personal details
- Born: Thomas Vincent Miller Jr. December 3, 1942 Clinton, Maryland, U.S.
- Died: January 15, 2021 (aged 78) Chesapeake Beach, Maryland, U.S.
- Party: Democratic
- Spouse: Patricia Miller
- Children: 5
- Education: University of Maryland, College Park (BA); University of Maryland, Baltimore (LLB)
- Thomas V. Miller Jr.'s voice Miller welcomes President Bill Clinton to the Maryland General Assembly. Recorded February 10, 1997

Thomas Vincent Miller Jr. (December 3, 1942 – January 15, 2021), known as Mike Miller, was an American politician from Maryland. He had been a state senator representing the 27th District (Calvert, Charles, and Prince George's counties) from 1975 to 2020 and served as its President from 1987 to 2020. He was the longest-serving President of the Maryland Senate, and was for a period the longest-serving state senate president in the United States.

== Early life and education ==
Miller was born in Clinton, Maryland, on December 3, 1942, the first of ten siblings, and attended Surrattsville High School. He studied at the University of Maryland, College Park where he was a member of Phi Sigma Kappa, and graduated with a B.S. in business administration in 1964. Miller went on to graduate from the University of Maryland School of Law in 1967 with an LL.B. degree. Miller was admitted to the Maryland Bar in 1967.

== Career ==
In 1971, he was elected to the Maryland House of Delegates from the third legislative district of Maryland in Prince George's County, and served in that position until his election to the state senate in 1975. The Senate office building in Annapolis was named after him due to his being the longest-serving Senate president in the history of the state legislature.

The Main Administration Building at his alma mater, the University of Maryland, College Park, was named after him on June 29, 2020. He was known as a tireless advocate for higher education institutions in Maryland and the building's official name became the "Thomas V. Miller Administration Building."

On October 24, 2019, he announced he would step down from his leadership post, citing fatigue caused by his cancer treatment. He stated that he intended to serve out the remainder of his Senate term.

On December 23, 2020, he announced his resignation from the senate, citing health reasons.

== Personal life ==
Miller was married; he and his wife lived in Chesapeake Beach and had five children, a son and four daughters. He was a Catholic.

In January 2019, Miller disclosed that he had been diagnosed with prostate cancer in July 2018 and underwent prescribed medication treatment; in December 2018 he underwent chemotherapy after the cancer was found to have progressed. Miller died at home in Chesapeake Beach from the effects of the disease on January 15, 2021.

Maryland House of Delegates
Preceded by Multi-member district	Member of the Maryland House of Delegates from the Prince George's County 3rd district 1971–1975	Succeeded by Constituency abolished
Maryland Senate
New constituency	Member of the Maryland Senate from the 28th district 1975–1983	Succeeded by James Simpson
Preceded by Frank Komenda	Member of the Maryland Senate from the 27th district 1983–2020	Succeeded by Michael A. Jackson
Political offices
Preceded by Melvin Steinberg	President of the Maryland Senate; 1987–2020	Succeeded by Bill Ferguson
