= Michael J. Wagner =

American politician

Michael J. Wagner (October 20, 1941 – February 13, 2014) was an American businessman and politician.

Born in Baltimore, Maryland, he went to Glen Burnie High School in Glen Burnie, Maryland and then received his associate degree in 1996 from the University of Baltimore. Wagner was in the restaurant supplies and food service business. Wagner also owned a catering business. He served as a justice of the peace in Anne Arundel County, Maryland in 1963 to 1964. He then served in the Maryland House of Delegates from 1975 to 1977 as a Democrat and then in the Maryland State Senate from 1977 to 1979 and 1982 to 1994. He was married to his wife for 52 years, Carol Ann Hudson, and they had two sons. Wagner died in Glen Burnie, Maryland.
