= Maryland Republican Party =

Maryland affiliate of the Republican Party

- Chairperson: Nicole Beus Harris
- House Leader: Jason C. Buckel
- Senate Leader: Steve Hershey
- Founded: 1854
- Student wing: Maryland Federation of College Republicans
- Youth wing: Maryland Young Republicans
- Women's wing: Maryland Federation of Republican Women
- LGBT Wing: Log Cabin Republicans of Maryland
- Membership (2024): ▲1,032,440
- Ideology: Conservatism
- National affiliation: Republican Party
- U.S. Senate: 0 / 2
- U.S. House of Representatives: 1 / 8
- Maryland Senate: 13 / 47
- Maryland House of Delegates: 39 / 141
- Statewide Executive Officers: 0 / 4
- County Executives: 3 / 9
- Baltimore City Council: 0 / 15
- County Council Seats: 30 / 77
- County Commission Seats: 46 / 54

Election symbol

Website
- mdgop.org

The Maryland Republican Party is the Maryland state branch of the Republican Party (GOP), headquartered in Annapolis. It is the state's minority party, controlling no statewide offices, minorities in both houses of the state legislature, and 1 of 8 U.S. House seats.

== History ==
Founded as a local branch of the nationwide Republican Party in 1854, the Maryland GOP has largely functioned as the local rival to the Maryland Democratic Party. The party has had long been in the minority in both chambers of the House of Delegates, however has been able to control the governorship several times thanks to popular moderate Republicans such as Theodore McKeldin, Spiro T. Agnew, Robert Ehrlich, and Larry Hogan.

The party's nominee, Daniel Cox, was defeated in a landslide to Democratic candidate Wes Moore in the 2022 Maryland gubernatorial election. As of 2023, the party holds none of the statewide elected offices, holds only 1 of Maryland's congressional districts, and holds a minority of the seats in both chambers of the General Assembly.

Number of self-identified Democrats vs. self-identified Republicans, per state, according to Gallup, January–June 2010, showing Maryland as third most Democratic.

== Current elected officials ==
=== Members of Congress ===
U.S. Senate

- None

Both of Maryland's U.S. Senate seats have been held by Democrats since 1987. Charles Mathias was the last Republican to represent Maryland in the U.S. Senate.

==== U.S. House of Representatives ====
District	Member	Photo
1st	Andy Harris	

=== Statewide offices ===
- None

=== State legislature ===
- Senate minority leader: Steve Hershey
- Senate minority Whip: Justin Ready
- House minority leader: Jason Buckel
- House minority Whip: Jesse Pippy

=== County government ===
Partisan control of county councils and boards of commissioners as of 2024 Democratic incumbent Republican incumbent

As of 2024, Republicans hold a majority of the seats on the boards of commissioners in eleven counties (Allegany, Calvert, Caroline, Carroll, Garrett, Kent, Queen Anne's, St. Mary's, Somerset, Washington, and Worcester) and the county councils in five counties (Cecil, Dorchester, Harford, Talbot, and Wicomico). The Republican Party also holds county executive seats in Cecil, Harford, and Wicomico counties.

== State party ==
Historically, the Republican Party has been very weak in Maryland. The Republican Party is the minority party in both houses of the Maryland General Assembly. In the House of Delegates, the Republicans control 39 seats to the Democrats' 102. In the Maryland State Senate, the Republicans control 13 seats to the Democrats' 34. Since 1854, the Republican Party has controlled both chambers of the General Assembly for only 5 years. There have been only 9 Republican governors of Maryland, and just 2 of those have managed to win re-election. In 2022, the Republican gubernatorial candidate, Dan Cox, lost by a landslide margin of 32.41%, which was the largest loss for any gubernatorial nominee since 1986, in which Republican Thomas J. Mooney lost by a margin of 64.74%.

The Republican Party enjoys widespread support from Western Maryland and the Eastern Shore, both of which are mainly rural. In other areas of the state such as heavily populated Montgomery County, Prince George's County, and the City of Baltimore, Republicans are a minority.

The majority of voters in the state of Maryland live in urban metropolitan areas such as Baltimore and are affiliated with the Democratic Party.

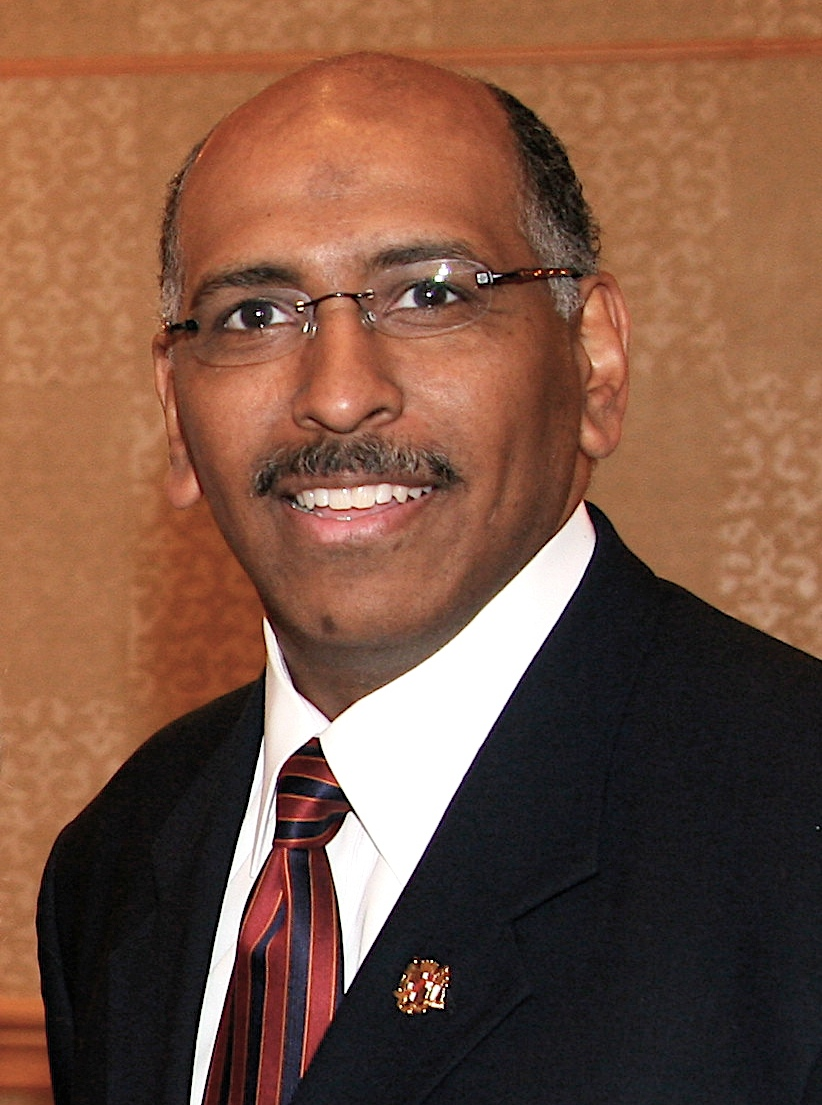
Former chair of the Republican National Committee Michael Steele

In 2003, Michael Steele became the first African American elected to statewide office in the state of Maryland, when he was elected lieutenant governor. Prior to this, Steele served as the chairman of the Maryland Republican Party. In 2009, Michael S. Steele was elected chair of the Republican National Committee, the first African American to hold that position.

== Financial status ==
The Washington Post characterized the party as "close to broke" as of January 2009, with $703.10 on hand and $57,000 in loans and bills. The Maryland Election Board also ruled in 2009 that the Maryland GOP must return $77,500 to a campaign account of Steele's for party legal expenses that he had paid. In November 2011 The Baltimore Sun reported that the Maryland Republican party owed over $100,000 to vendors that stemmed from the 2010 election cycle.

The picture changed after Republican Larry Hogan was elected as governor in November 2014. According to The Washington Post, "Hogan raised nearly $1.4 million in the two months after the election" and the state party raised another $1 million.

== Notable Maryland Republicans ==
Spiro Agnew was the Governor of Maryland from 1967 to 1969. In 1968, Agnew was chosen by Richard Nixon to be his running mate during the 1968 United States presidential election. After a landslide victory, Agnew became the 39th vice president of the United States. As of 2025, this is the highest political office any Maryland politician has held in the Federal government.

Robert L. Ehrlich, Jr. was the first Republican governor of Maryland since the 1960s, serving as governor from 2003 to 2007. After winning in 2002, he was defeated in the 2006 and 2010 election by Democratic candidate Martin O'Malley. Ehrlich's wife, Kendel Ehrlich, is a notable state Republican who hosts, along with her husband, a conservative talk radio show on WBAL 1090-AM in Baltimore.

Larry Hogan was the most recent Republican governor, he defeated Democratic candidate Anthony Brown in November 2014. Boyd Rutherford was Hogan's running mate and was Lt. Governor of Maryland. In 2018, Hogan won re-election as governor against Democratic challenger, Ben Jealous. This made him the first two-term Republican governor of Maryland since Theodore Roosevelt McKeldin.

Andy Harris has been the lone Republican member of Congress from Maryland since 2011. Currently, he is the second longest tenured House Representative in the state. His wife, Nicole, is the current chair of the MDGOP.

== Current leadership ==
The current officers of the Maryland Republican Party were elected at the fall 2024 convention to two year terms with the exception of the national committeeman and committeewomen who were elected at the spring 2022 convention to four-year terms.

In December 2022, the Maryland Republican Party elected Nicole Beus Harris, the wife of U.S. Representative Andy Harris, to serve as its chair following the decision of Dirk Haire not to seek reelection. She was re-elected in 2024.

Elected officers
Name	Office	First elected
Nicole Beus Harris	Chairwoman	2022
David Bossie	National committeeman	2016
Nicolee Ambrose	National committeewoman	2012
Dwight Patel	1st vice-chair	2024
Adam Wood	2nd vice-chair	2026
Richard Collins	3rd vice-chair	2024
Mark Uncapher	Secretary	2016
Chris Rosenthal	Treasurer	2006

The Maryland Republican Party also employs several staff members, including an executive director, a deputy director, and a data director.

== State party chairmen ==
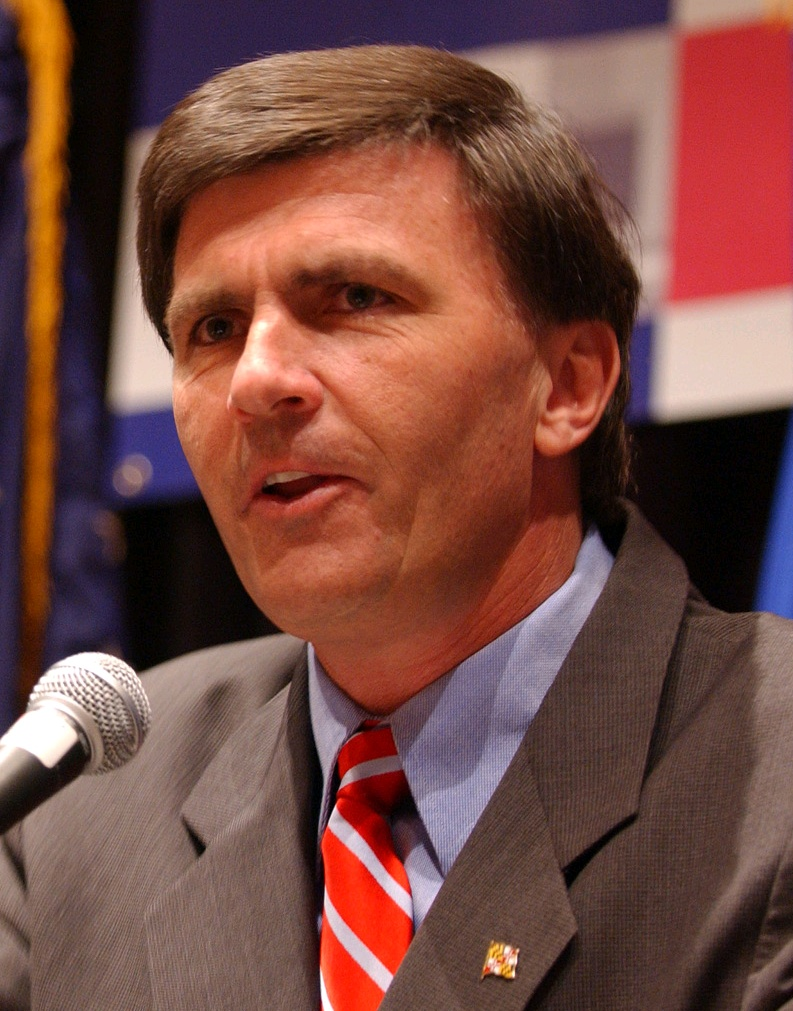
Former Maryland governor Robert L. Ehrlich, Jr. speaking at Healthier US summit.

Name	Term	Notes
Harry M. Clabaugh	1891–1899	
Isaac Ambrose Barber	1900–1904	
Galen L. Tait	1929–1934	
William P. Lawson	1934–1937	
W. David Tilghman	1937–1942	
Galen L. Tait	1942–1946	
Stanford Hoff	1946–1950	
Joseph L. Carter	1950–1952	
D. Eldred Rinehart	1952–1958	
David Scull	1962–1964	
Newton Steers	1964–1966	
Joseph M. Duckert	1966–1968	
Don R. Kendall	1968–1970	
Alexander M. Lankler	1970–1972	
Edward P. Thomas Jr.	1972–1974	Maryland State Senator
David R. Forward	1974–1977	
Aris T. Allen	1977–1978	First African American to hold position
Dr. Allan C. Levey	1978–1986	
Daniel E. Fleming	1986–1989	
Joyce Lyon Tehres	1989–1998	First woman to hold position
Dick Bennet	1998–2000	
Michael Steele	2000–2002	Resigned to become running mate of Bob Ehrlich
Louis Pope	2002	
John Kane	2002–2006	
Jim Pelura	2006–2009	Resigned
Audrey Scott	2009–2010	Elected in a Special Election
Alex Mooney	2010–2013	Resigned to run for Congress in West Virginia
Diana Waterman	2013–2016	Elected in a special election in 2013; elected to full term in own right in 2014
Dirk Haire	2016–2022	
Nicole Beus Harris	2022–present	Married to Congressman Andy Harris
