= Molly McKee-Seabrook =

American politician (born 1987/1988)

- McKee-Seabrook in 2024

Member-elect of the Maryland House of Delegates from the 22nd district
- Assuming office January 13, 2027
- Succeeding: Anne Healey

Personal details
- Born: 1987 or 1988 (age 38–39)
- Party: Democratic
- Children: 3
- Education: St. Mary's College of Maryland (BA)

Molly McKee-Seabrook (born 1987 or 1988) is an American politician who is a member-elect of the Maryland House of Delegates from the 22nd district. She is a member of the Democratic Party.

== Early life and education ==
McKee-Seabrook was born in 1987 or 1988, to Joe McKee and Mary Jane. She was raised in Hyattsville, Maryland, and graduated from St. Mary's College of Maryland in 2010, earning a Bachelor of Arts degree in sociology and political science.

== Career ==
McKee-Seabrook (center) at a bill signing with state senator Bill Ferguson, 2018

After graduating from St. Mary's College, McKee-Seabrook worked as a legislative aide to state senators Bill Ferguson and Paul G. Pinsky from October 2011 to October 2012, afterwards becoming Ferguson's chief of staff until January 2019. She then worked as the associate director of government relations for the University of Maryland, College Park.

== Maryland House of Delegates ==
In January 2023, after Governor Wes Moore appointed Alonzo T. Washington to the Maryland Senate, McKee-Seabrook told Maryland Matters that she planned to apply to serve the remainder of his term in the House of Delegates. However, she withdrew her name from consideration later that month after Washington endorsed Ashanti Martinez for the seat.

In 2026, McKee-Seabrook filed to run for the 22nd district of the Maryland House of Delegates. She won the Democratic primary on June 23, 2026, and ran unopposed in the general election. McKee-Seabrook will be assigned to the Economic Matters Committee.

== Political positions ==
McKee-Seabrook supports universal health care, economic and social justice, affordable housing, and relocating the Federal Bureau of Investigation headquarters to Greenbelt, Maryland.

== Personal life ==
McKee-Seabrook lives in Hyattsville with her husband and three children.
