= Rushern Baker =

American politician (born 1958)

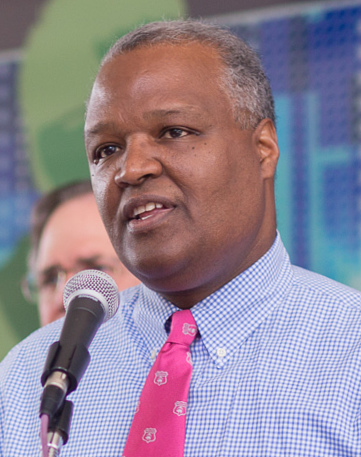

7th Executive of Prince George's County
- In office December 6, 2010 – December 3, 2018
- Preceded by: Jack B. Johnson
- Succeeded by: Angela Alsobrooks

Member of the Maryland House of Delegates from the 22B district
- In office August 11, 1994 – January 8, 2003
- Appointed by: William Donald Schaefer
- Preceded by: Paul G. Pinsky
- Succeeded by: Tawanna P. Gaines; Anne Healey; Justin Ross

Personal details
- Born: Rushern Leslie Baker III; October 24, 1958 (age 67) Valdosta, Georgia, U.S.
- Party: Democratic
- Spouse: Christa Beverly (died 2021)
- Children: 3, including Rush
- Education: Howard University (BA, JD)

Military service
- Branch/service: United States Army
- Years of service: 1987–2001
- Rank: Captain
- Unit: Army Judge Advocate General's Corps

Rushern Leslie Baker III (born October 24, 1958) is an American lawyer and politician who served as the 7th county executive of Prince George's County, Maryland from 2010 to 2018. He previously served as a member of the Maryland House of Delegates from 1994 to 2003, representing District 22B in northern Prince George's County. A member of the Democratic Party, Baker unsuccessfully ran for governor of Maryland in 2018 and 2022.

== Early life and education ==
Baker was born in Valdosta, Georgia, on October 24, 1958. His father, Rushern Jr., was an officer in the United States Army Special Forces and served in the Vietnam War and his mother, Carolyn, worked as a nurse's aide. Baker moved frequently during his childhood, including stints in Okinawa, Japan, before eventually settling in Springfield, Massachusetts.

Baker recalled having learning struggles in school. He attended five elementary schools, two middle schools, and two high schools before graduating from Classical High School, where he played for the high school football team as a running back and defensive back. Afterwards, Baker attended Howard University, where he earned his Bachelor of Arts degree in history in 1982 and his Juris Doctor degree in 1986, and was a member of the student government association. Afterwards, Baker was commissioned into the United States Army Judge Advocate General's Corps, serving from 1987 to 2001 and attaining the rank of captain.

== Career ==
After law school, Baker worked as a senior Congressional Black Caucus fellow in the office of U.S. Senator John Kerry for one year, afterwards working as a contract complaints officer in the District of Columbia Department of Housing and Community Development from 1987 to 1989. After serving as a legal counsel and special assistant for the Peoples Involvement Corporation from 1989 to 1999, Baker ran his own law firm, Baker & Perry LLP, until 2002.

Baker served as a delegate to the Democratic National Convention in 2000, 2004, 2008, 2012, 2016, and 2024.

=== Maryland House of Delegates ===
Baker was appointed to the Maryland House of Delegates by Governor William Donald Schaefer to succeed Paul G. Pinsky, who was appointed to the Maryland Senate. He was sworn in on August 11, 1994. Baker served as a member of the Judiciary Committee from 1995 to 1998, afterwards serving on the Appropriations Committee from 1999 to 2003. He was also a member of the Legislative Black Caucus of Maryland and was the chair of the Prince George's County Delegation from 1999 to 2003. During his tenure, Baker opposed legislation to provide $270 million in state funding for National Football League stadiums in Baltimore and Prince George's County, a bill designating English as the official state language, and the nomination of Richard N. Dixon—whose policies Baker compared to U.S. Supreme Court Justice Clarence Thomas—as Maryland State Treasurer. He supported bills to ban discrimination on the basis of sexual orientation, require the state to translate all public documents and forms into Spanish, and limit the powers of the Prince George's County Board of Education.

=== Prince George's County Executive ===
==== Elections ====
===== 2002 =====
In early 2000, Baker announced that he would run for Prince George's County Executive in 2002, seeking to succeed term-limited county executive Wayne Curry. He targeted women voters and enjoyed a boost in momentum after The Washington Post endorsed his campaign during the Democratic primary, but continued to trail county state's attorney Jack B. Johnson in polling up to election day. Baker was defeated in the Democratic primary by Johnson on September 10, 2002, placing second-to-last with 12.5 percent of the vote.

===== 2006 =====
In June 2005, Baker announced that he was forming an exploratory committee to run for Prince George's County Executive in 2006, challenging incumbent county executive Jack B. Johnson. He declared his candidacy in January 2006, and ran a campaign criticizing Johnson's handling of crime and education in Prince George's County. Baker was narrowly defeated in the Democratic primary in September 2006, receiving 47.5 percent of the vote to Johnson's 52.5 percent.

===== 2010 =====
Baker thrice ran for Prince George's County Executive in 2010, seeking to succeed term-limited county executive Jack B. Johnson. He won the Democratic primary in September 2010, defeating Prince George's County Sheriff Michael A. Jackson, who was backed by Johnson, and state delegate Gerron Levi with 43.9 percent of the vote. Baker ran unopposed in the general election.

===== 2014 =====
Baker filed to run for re-election as county executive in February 2014. He ran unopposed in both the primary and general elections.

==== Tenure ====
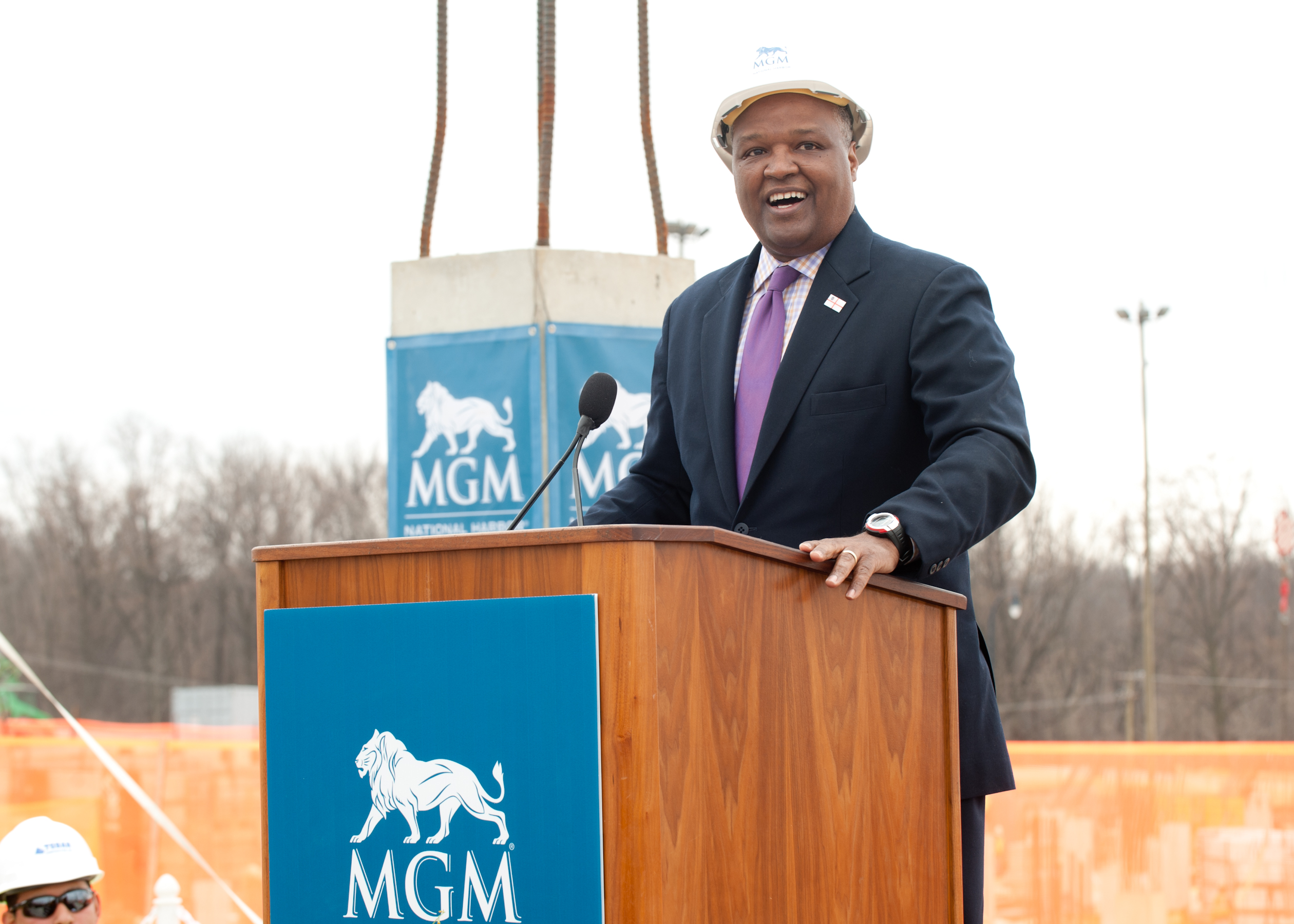
Baker at the construction of MGM National Harbor, 2015

Baker was sworn in as Prince George's County Executive on December 6, 2010.

During his tenure, Baker advocated for efforts to lure and retain businesses to the county and simplified the county's permitting process, which caused Prince George's County to undergo an economic revival that saw it lead the state's other jurisdictions in job growth and allowed it to achieve a budget surplus. Revitalization projects in the county's underserved communities and major development projects—including the MGM National Harbor casino, the University of Maryland Capital Region Medical Center, and the Purple Line transit line—broke ground under his administration. Baker also pushed for reforms to the county's ethics law amid the arrest of his predecessor, Jack B. Johnson, on federal corruption charges; and sought to rehabilitate the county's school system by proposing legislation to restructure the county Board of Education. He unsuccessfully sought to raise property taxes in Prince George's County to pay for education reforms and supported a failed referendum that would have increased the number of terms that county-elected officials could serve from two to three.

Baker received criticism for his handling of education issues in Prince George's County. After the Maryland General Assembly passed Baker-backed legislation in 2013 that allowed him to appoint the superintendent of the Prince George's County Board of Education as well as many of its members, Baker appointed Kevin Maxwell to serve as the board's superintendent. Under Maxwell's tenure, the school system lost $6.4 million in federal Head Start grants after a review found that county officials failed to address complaints that teachers in the program were humiliating and using corporal punishment against students; and was the subject of a state probe that found that the grades of nearly 5,500 students were altered between 2015 and 2017, which prompted the Maryland State Board of Education to assign a monitor to prevent future grade manipulation. Maxwell also approved large pay raises to a number of central-office employees without board approval. After Maxwell's tenure became an issue during the 2018 Democratic gubernatorial primary, Baker defended Maxwell by highlighting that the school system added nearly 9,000 students under his tenure and expanded specialty programs, including language immersion, full-day prekindergarten, and dual enrollment.

Baker initially declined to say how he would vote on Maryland Question 6, a ballot referendum to legalize same-sex marriage in Maryland, but finally endorsed the referendum in October 2012.

=== Gubernatorial campaigns ===
==== 2018 ====
On June 21, 2017, Baker announced that he would run for governor of Maryland in 2018, challenging incumbent Republican Governor Larry Hogan. In February 2018, Baker chose former 2016 Baltimore mayoral candidate Elizabeth Embry as his running mate.

During the Democratic primary, Baker touted his accomplishments toward the economy and crime as county executive, and supported proposals to raise the minimum wage to $15 an hour, increase funding for state community colleges, accelerate the state's clean energy transition, and revive the Red Line. He received endorsements from U.S. Senator Chris Van Hollen, U.S. Representative Steny Hoyer, Attorney General Brian Frosh, Montgomery County Executive Isiah Leggett, and former governors Parris Glendening and Martin O'Malley. He also received financial support from businessman David Trone, who was running for Congress in Maryland's 6th congressional district.

2018 Democratic gubernatorial primary election results by county: Map legend: Jealous—40–50%; Jealous—30–40%; Baker—30–40%; Baker—40–50%

Baker was defeated by former NAACP president Ben Jealous in the Democratic primary election on June 26, 2018, placing second with 29.3 percent of the vote. The Washington Post blamed his loss on Baker's failure to aggressively tout his accomplishments as county executive, lackluster fundraising skills, and his past conflicts with county unions and activists. Following his defeat, Baker campaigned for Jealous in the general election, in which Jealous was defeated by Hogan.

==== 2022 ====
On April 8, 2021, Baker that he would again run for governor of Maryland in 2022, seeking to succeed term-limited Governor Larry Hogan. His running mate was Nancy Navarro, a member of the Montgomery County Council from 2009 to 2022. During the Democratic primary, Baker unveiled a crime and policing plan that included proposals to increase police hiring, address vacant housing in Baltimore, and provide jobs and education to squeegee boys. He also criticized the leaked draft majority opinion for the U.S. Supreme Court case Dobbs v. Jackson Women's Health Organization.

Initially viewed as one of the frontrunners in the race alongside Comptroller Peter Franchot, Baker fell behind in polls and fundraising; by June 2022, his campaign reported having less than $100,000 cash on hand and placing a distant fourth in polls of the Democratic primary. Furthermore, many of the high-profile elected officials who backed Baker's 2018 campaign had endorsed other candidates. He suspended his campaign on June 10, 2022.

=== Post-county executive career ===
Since leaving office, Baker has run his own consulting firm, Baker Strategy Group. In July 2019, Senate President Thomas V. Miller Jr. appointed Baker to the University of Maryland Medical System board. During his tenure, Baker worked with the University of Maryland, College Park to establish the Elected Executive Leadership Program. He left the board 2021.

In December 2024, after county executive Angela Alsobrooks resigned as county executive following her win in the 2024 United States Senate election in Maryland, Baker expressed interest in running in the 2025 Prince George's County executive special election. He officially entered the race on December 10, 2024. He was defeated by state's attorney Aisha Braveboy in the Democratic primary, placing second with 19.3% of the vote. Baker served on Braveboy's county executive transition team after she defeated Republican nominee Jonathan White in the general election in June 2025.

In February 2026, Baker announced that he would run for Congress in Maryland's 5th congressional district, seeking to succeed Steny Hoyer, who is retiring. During his campaign, Baker pledged to support proposals to strengthen health care and medical research, support caregivers and veterans, and lower consumer costs. In June 2026, Baker joined fellow candidates Quincy Bareebe and Harry Dunn to criticize state delegate Adrian Boafo after AIPAC's United Democracy Project super PAC and pro-cryptocurrency super PAC Protect Progress spent nearly $8 million in independent expenditures boosting Boafo's campaign. Baker was defeated by Boafo in the Democratic primary election on June 23, 2026, placing fifth with 10.5 percent of the vote.

== Personal life ==
Baker met his wife, Christa Beverly, as an undergraduate at Howard University in 1978. Baker is a member of Gamma Pi chapter of Omega Psi Phi fraternity. The Bakers lived in Washington, D.C., briefly, before settling in Cheverly, Maryland, where they raised three children, including son Rushern Baker IV. Rushern IV briefly served as Baker's campaign manager during the final weeks of his 2022 gubernatorial campaign.

In 2010, Baker's wife, Christa, was diagnosed with Early-onset Alzheimer's disease. The family decided to speak publicly about her diagnosis in 2012 in order to increase awareness for the disease and advocate for greater funding for medical research. Baker is an active member of the Alzheimer's Association. In 2016, Baker got a tattoo of her initials and the logo for the Alzheimer's Association on his arm. Christa died due to Alzheimer's disease on September 18, 2021.

In March 2024, Baker received the Thomas Kennedy Award from the Maryland House of Delegates.

== Electoral history ==
Maryland House of Delegates District 22B Democratic primary election, 1994
Party	Candidate	Votes	%
Democratic	Rushern Baker (incumbent)	1,141	49.9
Democratic	David Bird	705	30.9
Democratic	John Pepper	439	19.2

Maryland House of Delegates District 22B election, 1994
Party	Candidate	Votes	%
Democratic	Rushern Baker (incumbent)	3,244	100.0

Maryland House of Delegates District 22B election, 1998
Party	Candidate	Votes	%
Democratic	Rushern Baker (incumbent)	4,630	83.4
Republican	Peter Justesen	923	16.6

Prince George's County Executive Democratic primary election, 2002
Party	Candidate	Votes	%
Democratic	Jack B. Johnson	39,503	37.0
Democratic	M. H. Jim Estepp	20,748	19.5
Democratic	C. Anthony Muse	19,976	18.7
Democratic	Rushern Baker	13,344	12.5
Democratic	Major Riddick	13,102	12.3

Prince George's County Executive Democratic primary election, 2006
Party	Candidate	Votes	%
Democratic	Jack B. Johnson (incumbent)	55,403	52.5
Democratic	Rushern Baker	50,141	47.5

Prince George's County Executive Democratic primary election, 2010
Party	Candidate	Votes	%
Democratic	Rushern Baker	41,352	43.9
Democratic	Michael A. Jackson	30,788	32.7
Democratic	Samuel H. Dean	11,728	12.5
Democratic	Gerron Levi	6,983	7.4
Democratic	Henry C. Turner Jr.	3,272	3.5

Prince George's County Executive election, 2010
Party	Candidate	Votes	%
Democratic	Rushern Baker	206,924	99.3
Write-in		1,543	0.7

Prince George's County Executive election, 2014
Party	Candidate	Votes	%
Democratic	Rushern Baker (incumbent)	195,849	98.8
Write-in		2,293	1.2

Maryland gubernatorial Democratic primary, 2018
Party	Candidate	Votes	%
Democratic	Ben Jealous; Susan Turnbull	231,895	39.6
Democratic	Rushern Baker; Elizabeth Embry	171,696	29.3
Democratic	Jim Shea; Brandon Scott	48,647	8.3
Democratic	Krish O'Mara Vignarajah; Sharon Blake	48,041	8.2
Democratic	Richard Madaleno; Luwanda Jenkins	34,184	5.8
Democratic	Kevin Kamenetz †; Valerie Ervin (withdrawn)	18,851	3.2
Democratic	Alec Ross; Julie Verratti	13,780	2.4
Democratic	Ralph Jaffe; Freda Jaffe	9,405	1.6
Democratic	James Jones; Charles Waters	9,188	1.6

Maryland gubernatorial Democratic primary, 2022
Party	Candidate	Votes	%
Democratic	Wes Moore; Aruna Miller	217,524	32.4
Democratic	Tom Perez; Shannon Sneed	202,175	30.1
Democratic	Peter Franchot; Monique Anderson-Walker	141,586	21.1
Democratic	Rushern Baker (withdrawn); Nancy Navarro (withdrawn)	26,594	4.0
Democratic	Doug Gansler; Candace Hollingsworth	25,481	3.8
Democratic	John King Jr.; Michelle Siri	24,882	3.7
Democratic	Ashwani Jain; LaTrece Hawkins Lytes	13,784	2.1
Democratic	Jon Baron; Natalie Williams	11,880	1.8
Democratic	Jerome Segal; Justinian M. Dispenza	4,276	0.6
Democratic	Ralph Jaffe; Mark Greben	2,978	0.4

Political offices
Preceded by Jack B. Johnson	Executive of Prince George's County; 2010–2018	Succeeded by Angela Alsobrooks
