= Nicole A. Williams =

American politician (born 1977)

Nicole Williams
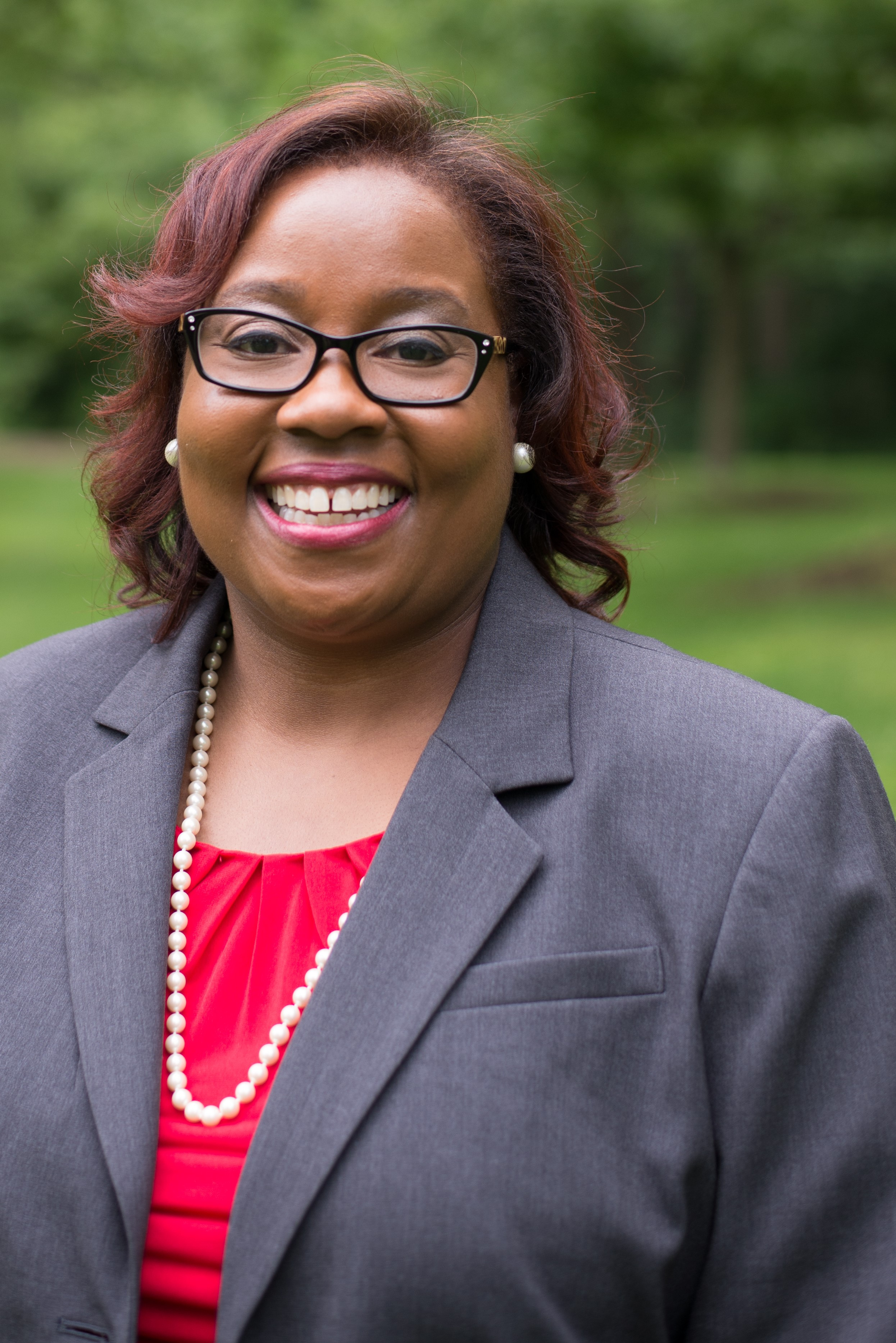

Member of the Maryland House of Delegates from the 22nd district
- Incumbent
- Assumed office December 6, 2019 Serving with Anne Healey, Ashanti Martinez
- Appointed by: Larry Hogan
- Preceded by: Tawanna P. Gaines

Personal details
- Born: September 23, 1977 (age 48) Washington, D.C., U.S.
- Party: Democratic
- Education: University of Pittsburgh (BA, JD)
- Website: Campaign website

Nicole Annette Williams (born September 23, 1977) is an American attorney and politician serving as a Democratic member of the Maryland House of Delegates representing District 22, which represents a portion of Prince George's County, Maryland.

== Early life and career ==
Williams was born on September 23, 1977, in Washington, D.C. She attended the University of Pittsburgh, where she earned a B.A. degree in history and communications in 1999, and the University of Pittsburgh School of Law, where she earned a J.D. degree in 2002. She was admitted into the Maryland Bar in 2002, the District of Columbia Bar in 2005, and the Virginia State Bar in 2015. After graduating, Williams worked as an attorney for several law firms, including Ober, Kaler, Grimes & Shriver, Hileman & Williams, and Rees Broome.

Williams first became involved with politics in 2010, when she filed to run for the Maryland House of Delegates in District 23A. In 2012, she successfully ran for delegate to the Democratic National Convention, representing Barack Obama. In 2014, Williams graduated from a training course hosted by Emerge Maryland, an organization created to prepare potential female Democratic candidates for public office, and ran for the Prince George's County Democratic Central Committee, representing District 22. In September 2017, she announced that she would run for the Maryland House of Delegates in 2018. She came in fourth place in a field of five candidates, receiving 13.8 percent of the vote. In December 2018, Williams was elected to be the 3rd vice chair of the Maryland Democratic Party.

Since 2019, Williams has served on the board of directors of Emerge Maryland.

== In the legislature ==
In October 2019, after state delegate Tawanna P. Gaines resigned from the Maryland House of Delegates after being indicted on wire fraud charges, Williams applied to serve the remainder of Gaines's term. Her candidacy was endorsed by state senator Paul G. Pinsky and state delegates Anne Healey and Alonzo T. Washington. The Prince George's County Democratic Central Committee voted to recommend Williams to Governor Larry Hogan to fill the vacant seat in October 2019. Hogan appointed her to the Maryland House of Delegates on November 15, 2019, and Williams was sworn in on December 6, 2019. She was a member of the Judiciary Committee from 2020 to 2027.

Williams ran as a delegate to the 2020 Democratic National Convention, pledged to Elizabeth Warren. She was an at-large delegate to the 2024 Democratic National Convention, pledged to Kamala Harris.

== 2026 congressional campaign ==
In February 2026, Williams announced that she would run for Maryland's 5th congressional district in 2026, seeking to succeed Steny Hoyer, who is retiring. During her campaign, Williams campaigned on a platform centered on preserving democracy and addressing affordability concerns, and criticized the second Trump administration for federal mass layoffs that affected thousands of the district's residents. Williams suspended her campaign for Congress on May 5, 2026, saying that she no longer had the financial resources to compete in the crowded Democratic primary. She remained on the ballot and placed ninth in the Democratic primary with 1.4 percent of the vote.

== Political positions ==
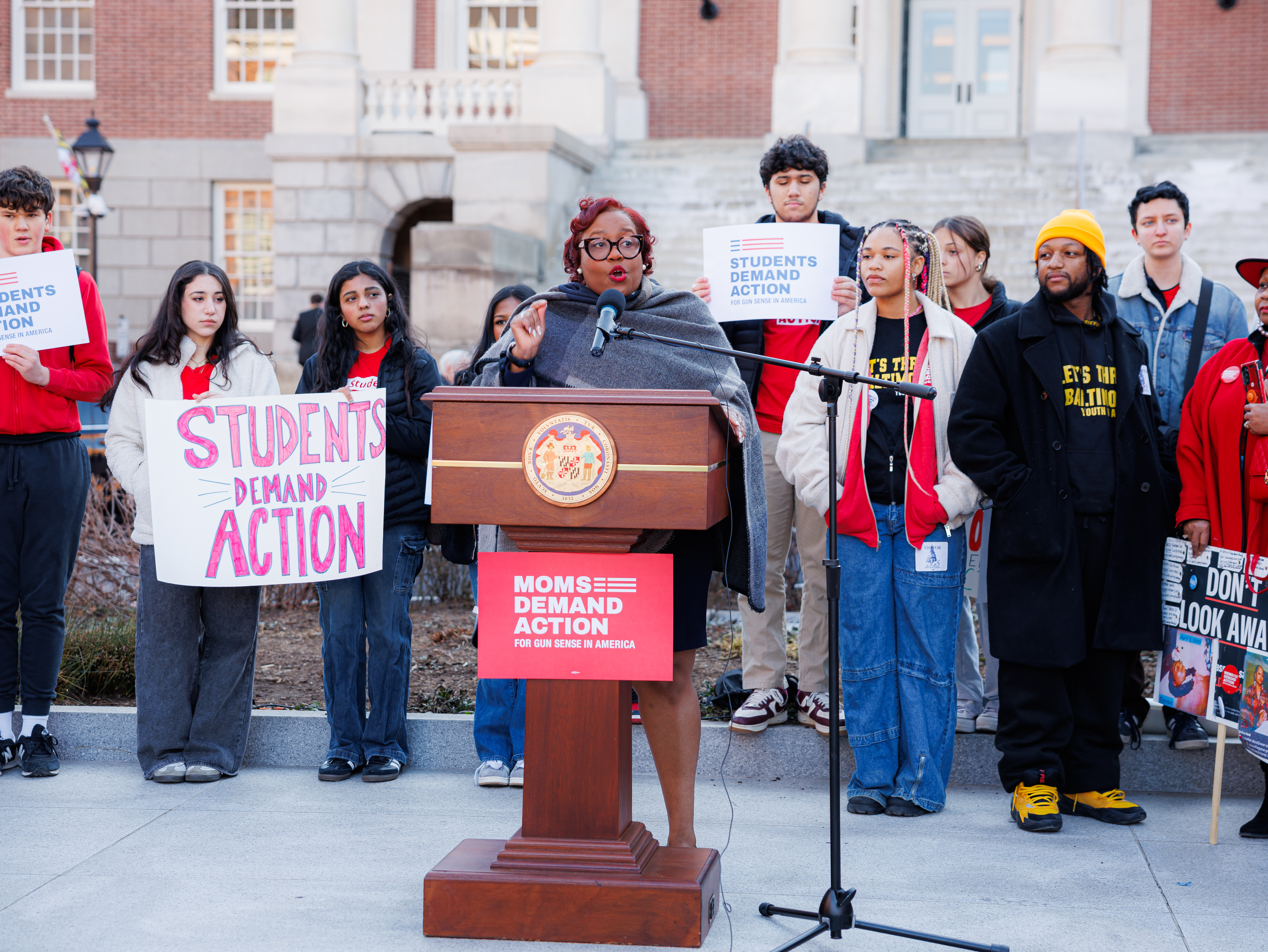
Williams speaks at a Moms Demand Action rally in Annapolis, 2025

=== Abortion ===
In January 2022, Williams attended a pro-choice rally at Lawyers Mall in Annapolis, Maryland. During the 2022 legislative session, Williams introduced legislation that would establish that civil or criminal charges can't be pursued against people who experience miscarriages, stillbirths, or from undergoing abortion services.

=== Elections ===
During the 2021 legislative session, Williams introduced a bill that would allow voters to cast ballots at curbside voting locations.

In July 2021, Williams attended a public hearing hosted by the Maryland Citizens Redistricting Commission to ask commission members to keep the state's current multi-member legislative district system in their proposed map.

=== Gun control ===
During the 2026 legislative session, William introduced a bill to ban the sale of firearms that can be converted into automatic firearms through the use of a Glock switch.

=== Social issues ===
In February 2022, Williams attended a rally to urge lawmakers to pass the Time to Care Act, legislation that would offer paid family leave to all Marylanders.

During the 2025 legislative session, Williams introduced a bill to repeal the prohibition of selling condoms in public school vending machines. After passing the House of Delegates, the bill died in the Senate Judicial Proceedings Committee.

=== Transportation ===
In May 2021, Williams attended a rally alongside a number of elected officials to protest a proposed Maglev train between Baltimore and Washington, D.C. Williams introduced legislation during the 2021 legislative session that would block the use of state funds to construct the maglev.

== Personal life ==
Williams attends religious services at the Metropolitan Baptist Church in Largo, Maryland.

== Electoral history ==
Maryland House of Delegates District 23A Democratic Primary Election, 2010
Party	Candidate	Votes	%
Democratic	Geraldine Valentino-Smith	5,622	32.6%
Democratic	James W. Hubbard	4,621	26.8%
Democratic	Shukoor Ahmed	3,089	17.9%
Democratic	Lisa Ransom	1,658	9.6%
Democratic	Nicole A. Williams	1,389	8.1%
Democratic	Paulette Faulkner	437	2.5%
Democratic	Terence D. Collins	410	2.4%

Female Delegates and Alternate to the Democratic National Convention, District 5, 2012
Party	Candidate	Votes	%
Democratic	Kisha A. Brown (Obama)	36,766	16.2%
Democratic	Nicole A. Williams (Obama)	35,864	15.8%
Democratic	Denise Riley (Obama)	35,759	15.8%
Democratic	Denise Riley (Obama)	35,759	15.8%
Democratic	Lafonda Fenwick (Obama)	34,567	15.2%
Democratic	Jessy P. Mejia (Obama)	34,311	15.1%
Democratic	Beth E. Swoap (Obama)	33,676	14.9%
Democratic	Gwen S. McCall (Uncommitted)	5,363	2.4%
Democratic	Eloise Evans (Uncommitted)	5,289	2.3%
Democratic	Bernadette M. James (Uncommitted)	5,087	2.2%

Prince George's County Democratic Central Committee At Large Primary Election, District 22, 2014
Party	Candidate	Votes	%
Democratic	Nicole A. Williams	70,754	100.0%

Maryland House of Delegates District 23 Democratic Primary Election, 2018
Party	Candidate	Votes	%
Democratic	Alonzo T. Washington	10,739	31.2%
Democratic	Tawanna P. Gaines	8,615	25.0%
Democratic	Anne Healey	6,853	19.9%
Democratic	Nicole A. Williams	4,761	13.8%
Democratic	Ashanti Martinez	3,486	10.1%

Female Delegates and Alternate to the Democratic National Convention, District 5, 2020
Party	Candidate	Votes	%
Democratic	Denise C. Mitchell (Biden)	64,765	16.3%
Democratic	Ashleigh S. Phillips (Biden)	61,374	15.4%
Democratic	Joseline Peña-Melnyk (Biden)	60,904	15.3%
Democratic	Kathleen Kennedy Townsend (Biden)	59,982	15.1%
Democratic	Arleathia West (Biden)	58,971	14.8%
Democratic	Shabnam Ahmed (Sanders)	10,345	2.6%
Democratic	Leena G. Mohamed (Sanders)	7,666	1.9%
Democratic	Olivia Delaplaine (Sanders)	7,650	1.9%
Democratic	Suchitra Balachandran (Sanders)	7,353	1.8%
Democratic	Vivien Zhu (Sanders)	7,034	1.8%
Democratic	Tamara Davis Brown (Uncommitted)	6,601	1.7%
Democratic	Jasmine A. Leal-Taylor (Warren)	5,488	1.4%
Democratic	Nicole A. Williams (Warren)	4,922	1.2%
Democratic	Abena Affum-McAllister (Warren)	4,717	1.2%
Democratic	Vivian Alana Caesar (Warren)	3,734	0.9%
Democratic	Laura Hart (Warren)	3,253	0.8%
Democratic	Alexus Viegas (Warren)	2,226	0.6%
Democratic	Laura C. Siemers-Kennedy (Warren)	1,900	0.5%
Democratic	Brooke Clagett (Buttigieg)	1,872	0.5%
Democratic	Starr Barbour (Uncommitted)	1,718	0.4%
Democratic	Briana Urbina (Yang)	1,677	0.4%
Democratic	Joan Whelan (Warren)	1,677	0.4%
Democratic	Patti Kim (Yang)	1,445	0.4%
Democratic	Rosemary Colby (Uncommitted)	1,422	0.4%
Democratic	Kelsey L. Crockett (Yang)	1,377	0.3%
Democratic	Deborah Hoyt Richardson (Buttigieg)	1,276	0.3%
Democratic	Mary M. Wilcox (Uncommitted)	1,235	0.3%
Democratic	Rebecca G. Rhodes (Yang)	1,073	0.3%
Democratic	Tyler Elizabeth Holman (Yang)	993	0.2%
Democratic	Catherine Patricia Scott (Buttigieg)	991	0.2%
Democratic	Nancy A. Oppenheim (Klobuchar)	815	0.2%
Democratic	Jillian Villars (Yang)	684	0.2%
