= Anne Healey =

American politician (born 1951)

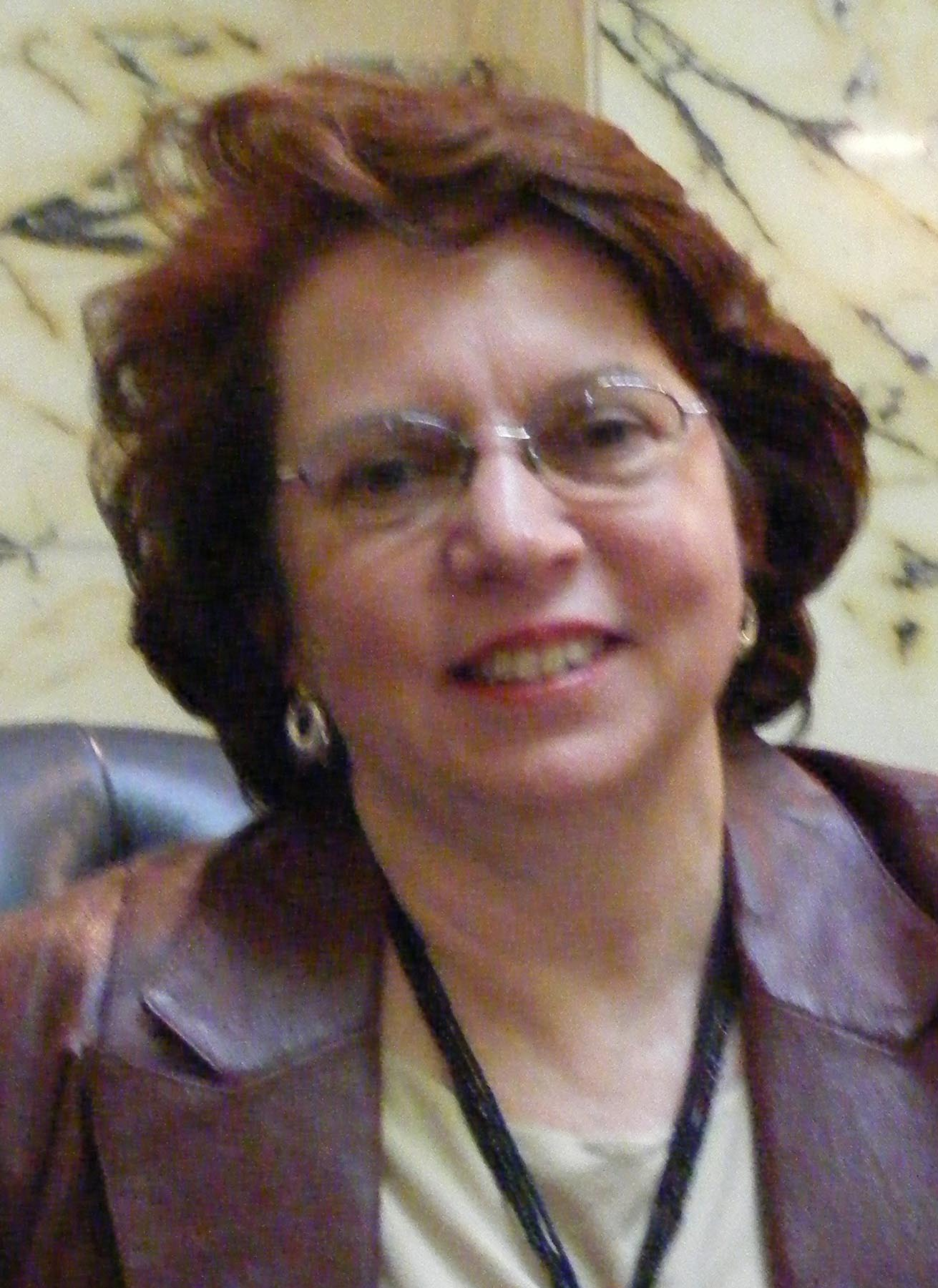
- Healey in 2007

Member of the Maryland House of Delegates from the 22nd district
- Incumbent
- Assumed office January 9, 1991 Serving with Ashanti Martinez and Nicole A. Williams
- Preceded by: Anne MacKinnon

Personal details
- Born: January 2, 1951 (age 75) Scranton, Pennsylvania, U.S.
- Party: Democratic
- Spouse: Neal Conway
- Children: 2
- Profession: Freelance writer

Anne Healey (born January 2, 1951) is an American politician. She is a member of the Maryland House of Delegates, representing District 22 in Prince George's County since 1991. She previously served on the City Council in Hyattsville, Maryland from 1987 to 1990.

== Early life and education ==
Healey was born in Scranton, Pennsylvania on January 2, 1951. She graduated from Cathedral High School, and later attended Marywood College, where she earned a B.A. degree in 1972, and the Catholic University of America, where she earned a M.A. degree in 1974.

== Career ==
After graduating, Healey became a newspaper writer and editor for various Maryland-based newspapers, including The Catholic Review, The Prince George's Sentinel, and The Prince George's Post.

Healey first got involved with politics in grade school after attending a campaign parade for then-presidential candidate John F. Kennedy. After a 15-year long career in journalism, Healey decided to pursue a career in politics. From 1987 to 1990, Healey served on the Hyattsville City Council. Afterwards, she ran for state delegate in District 22, winning the Democratic primary with 18 percent of the vote and the general election with 24 percent of the vote.

== In the legislature ==
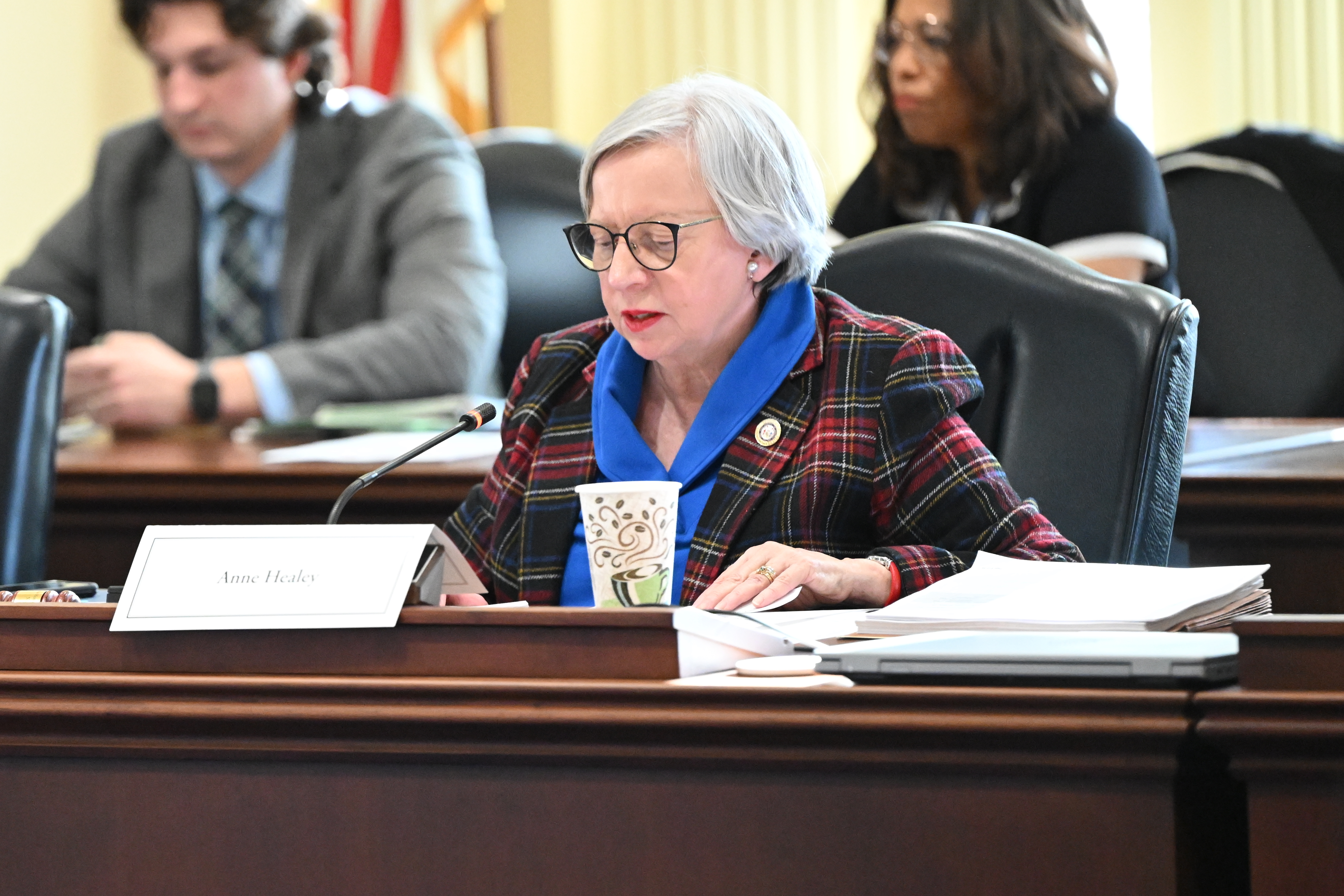
Healey in the House Rules and Executive Nominations Committee, 2026

Healey was sworn into the Maryland House of Delegates on January 9, 1991.

During her tenure, Healey served as a member of the Ways and Means Committee from 1991 to 2006, afterwards serving on the Environmental Matters Committee (later renamed to the Environment and Transportation Committee) until 2027. She was also a member of the Rules and Executive Nominations Committee from 1998 to 2006, later serving as the committee's chair from 2013 to 2027. Healey was a member of the Prince George's County Delegation, the Women Legislators of Maryland, the Maryland Bicycle and Pedestrian Caucus, the Maryland Veterans Caucus, the Maryland Legislative Latino Caucus, and the Maryland Legislative Transit Caucus.

On January 6, 2026, Healey announced that she would not run for re-election in 2026.

== Political positions ==
=== Education ===
Healey introduced legislation during the 2013 legislative session that would make the Maryland school year start after Labor Day. The bill passed to form a task force investigating a post-Labor Day start, of which Healey was a member. In 2019, Healey voted for, and later voted to override the governor's veto on, a bill that would allow school districts to start before Labor Day.

=== Environment ===
In 2015, Healey introduced legislation to protect bees from neonics. The bill passed and became law on May 28, 2016.

In 2017, Healey sponsored legislation that would require developers to replant an acre of trees for every acre of forest they clear. Healey introduced legislation during the 2018 legislative session that would create a state definition for priority forests to improve state conservation laws. In 2019, Healey introduced legislation to create a task force to monitor and address future deforestation and make recommendations to prevent forest loss without disrupting growth and development.

=== Health care ===
In 2004, Healey voted in favor of legislation that would levy a two-percent tax on health maintenance organizations to keep medical malpractice insurance costs for doctors in check.

In 2006, Healey voted in favor of legislation that would require Walmart to pay more for employee health care benefits. The bill was vetoed by Governor Bob Ehrlich, and the legislature failed to override his veto on an 88-50 vote in the House and a 30-17 vote in the Senate.

In 2019, Healey voted in favor of legislation that would create a five-person panel to investigate and negotiate the prices of high-priced drugs.

=== Immigration ===
In 2021, Healey voted in favor of legislation that would prohibit state and local government agencies from providing records or data to U.S. Immigration and Customs Enforcement for the purpose of civil immigration enforcement.

=== National politics ===
During the 2016 presidential primaries, Healey endorsed Martin O'Malley. In 2020, she endorsed Joe Biden.

=== Social issues ===
In 2001, Healey voted in favor of legislation that would ban discrimination based on sexual orientation. In 2006, she opposed legislation that would ban gay marriage in Maryland. The bill failed to pass out of the House of Delegates on a 61-78 vote.

Healey opposes the death penalty. In 2013, she voted in favor of legislation to repeal the death penalty, which was signed into law by Governor Martin O'Malley.

In 2003, Healey supported a proposal that would strip funding for abortion from the state budget. In 2005, she voted against a bill to provide state funding toward embryonic stem cell research. In 2022, Healey voted against the Abortion Care Access Act, a bill to expand the array of medical providers who could perform abortions. She also voted against overriding the gubernatorial veto on the bill. Healey was targeted for a primary challenge by Pro-Choice Maryland in 2022 for her anti-abortion stances. She won the primary.

=== Taxes ===
In 2013, Healey voted in favor of legislation to raise the state's fuel tax to replenish the state's transportation fund. In 2015, Healey voted against legislation that would repeal Maryland's "Rain Tax".

== Personal life ==
While reporting for The Catholic Review, Healey met her future husband, Neal Conway. Together, they have lived in Hyattsville since 1979 and have raised two children. Healey is a devout Catholic and is of Irish descent. In September 2015, she was invited to attend Pope Francis's visit to the White House.

In June 2020, Healey was diagnosed with breast cancer. Her chemotherapy treatments ended in December and she continued to receive radiation treatment during the 2021 legislative session.

== Electoral history ==
Maryland House of Delegates District 22 Democratic Primary Election, 1990
Party	Candidate	Votes	%
Democratic	Richard A. Palumbo	6,501	31
Democratic	Paul G. Pinsky	5,232	25
Democratic	Anne Healey	3,874	18
Democratic	M. Teresa O'Hare Johnson	3,366	16
Democratic	C. Hope Brown	2,050	10

Maryland House of Delegates District 22 General Election, 1990
Party	Candidate	Votes	%
Democratic	Richard A. Palumbo	10,353	27
Democratic	Paul G. Pinsky	9,566	25
Democratic	Anne Healey	9,355	24
Republican	Mary E. Rand	3,164	8
Republican	Gerard F. Kiernan	3,118	8
Republican	Bruce Gordon Pope	2,666	7

Maryland House of Delegates District 22A Democratic Primary Election, 1994
Party	Candidate	Votes	%
Democratic	Richard A. Palumbo	4,998	39
Democratic	Anne Healey	3,591	28
Democratic	Timothy Sullivan	1,910	15
Democratic	Stewart R. Henderson	1,671	13
Democratic	Scott R. Wilson	288	2
Democratic	Jack R. Jones	217	2

Maryland House of Delegates District 22A General Election, 1994
Party	Candidate	Votes	%
Democratic	Richard A. Palumbo	9,246	34
Democratic	Anne Healey	8,475	31
Republican	William Anthony McConkey	5,584	20
Republican	Keith L. Poptanich	3,989	15

Maryland House of Delegates District 22A Democratic Primary Election, 1998
Party	Candidate	Votes	%
Democratic	Richard A. Palumbo	3,329	45
Democratic	Anne Healey	3,181	43
Democratic	Eileen Dowd	690	9
Democratic	Steven Ross Shaw	229	3

Maryland House of Delegates District 22A General Election, 1998
Party	Candidate	Votes	%
Democratic	Richard A. Palumbo	11,375	50
Democratic	Anne Healey	11,204	50

Maryland House of Delegates District 22 Democratic Primary Election, 2002
Party	Candidate	Votes	%
Democratic	Tawanna P. Gaines	6,749	23.9
Democratic	Anne Healey	6,568	23.3
Democratic	Justin Ross	5,916	21.0
Democratic	David R. Merkowitz	4,584	16.3
Democratic	Michael Wein	2,423	8.6
Democratic	John Shields	1,954	6.9

Maryland House of Delegates District 22 General Election, 2002
Party	Candidate	Votes	%
Democratic	Anne Healey	16,670	30.56
Democratic	Justin Ross	16,243	29.78
Democratic	Tawanna P. Gaines	15,871	29.10
Republican	Dominique J. Brown	5,652	10.36
	Other Write-Ins	111	0.20

Maryland House of Delegates District 22 Democratic Primary Election, 2006
Party	Candidate	Votes	%
Democratic	Tawanna P. Gaines	6,947	29.4
Democratic	Justin Ross	6,382	27.0
Democratic	Anne Healey	5,865	24.8
Democratic	Karren Pope-Onwukwe	4,418	18.7

Maryland House of Delegates District 22 Democratic Primary Election, 2006
Party	Candidate	Votes	%
Democratic	Tawanna P. Gaines	17,572	33.9
Democratic	Anne Healey	17,258	33.3
Democratic	Justin Ross	16,818	32.4
	Other Write-Ins	187	0.4

Maryland House of Delegates District 22 Democratic Primary Election, 2010
Party	Candidate	Votes	%
Democratic	Tawanna P. Gaines	7,295	34.0
Democratic	Justin Ross	7,224	33.6
Democratic	Anne Healey	6,950	32.4

Maryland House of Delegates District 22 General Election, 2010
Party	Candidate	Votes	%
Democratic	Tawanna P. Gaines	18,550	34.7
Democratic	Justin Ross	17,399	32.5
Democratic	Anne Healey	17,302	32.4
	Other Write-Ins	207	0.4

Maryland House of Delegates District 22 Democratic Primary Election, 2014
Party	Candidate	Votes	%
Democratic	Alonzo T. Washington	7,504	31.6
Democratic	Tawanna P. Gaines	6,284	26.5
Democratic	Anne Healey	6,117	25.8
Democratic	Rushern Baker IV	3,840	16.2

Maryland House of Delegates District 22 General Election, 2014
Party	Candidate	Votes	%
Democratic	Tawanna P. Gaines	19,174	31.9
Democratic	Alonzo T. Washington	18,677	31.1
Democratic	Anne Healey	18,214	30.3
Republican	Lynn White	3,910	6.5
	Other Write-Ins	140	0.2

Maryland House of Delegates District 22 Democratic Primary Election, 2018
Party	Candidate	Votes	%
Democratic	Alonzo T. Washington	10,739	31.2
Democratic	Tawanna P. Gaines	8,615	25.0
Democratic	Anne Healey	6,853	19.9
Democratic	Nicole A. Williams	4,761	13.8
Democratic	Ashanti Martinez	3,486	10.1

Maryland House of Delegates District 22 General Election, 2018
Party	Candidate	Votes	%
Democratic	Tawanna P. Gaines	29,461	33.6
Democratic	Alonzo T. Washington	27,401	31.2
Democratic	Anne Healey	26,209	29.9
Republican	Winnie Obike	4,416	5.0
	Other Write-Ins	278	0.3
