= Rushern Baker IV =

American painter, educator, politician (born 1987)

Rush Baker
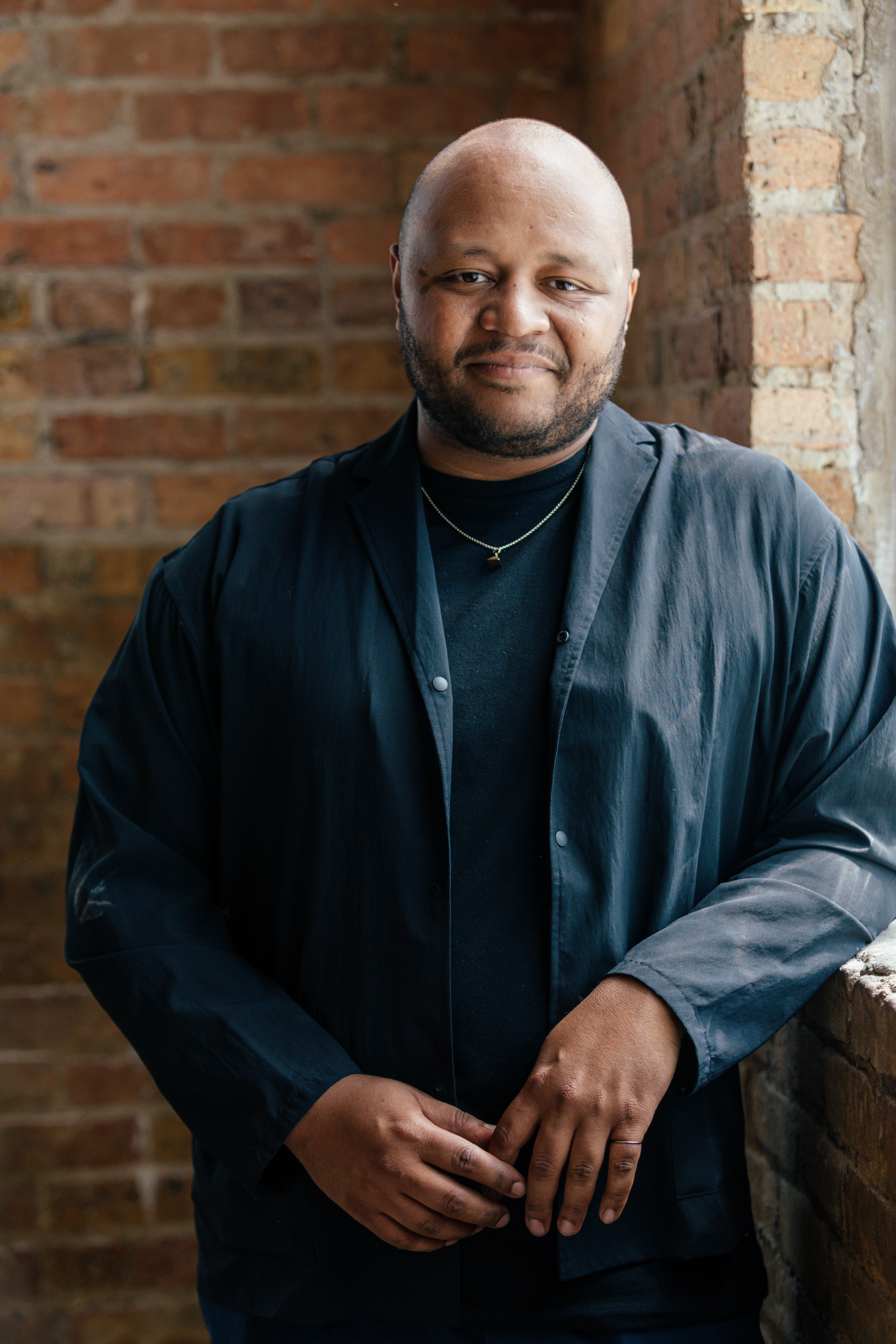
- Born: September 10, 1987 (age 38); Washington, D.C., U.S.
- Education: Cooper Union (BFA); Yale University (MFA)
- Relatives: Rushern Baker (father)

Rush Baker IV (born September 10, 1987) is an American painter, educator, and politician. He is an assistant professor at the School of the Art Institute Chicago, and past candidate for the Maryland House of Delegates to represent District 22 in Prince George's County.

== Early life and education ==
Rushern Baker IV was born in Washington, D.C. on September 10, 1987, to parents Rushern L. Baker III, and the late Christa Beverly. When he was four years old, his family moved to Cheverly, Maryland. Baker attended Prince George's County public schools and graduated from Suitland High School in Forestville, Maryland.

He earned a Bachelor of Fine Arts degree from Cooper Union in 2009, and a Master of Fine Arts degree with a concentration in painting/printmaking from Yale University in 2012, where he was awarded the Elizabeth Canfield Hicks Award for outstanding achievement in drawing or painting from nature.

== Career ==
After graduating from Yale, Baker moved back to Prince George's County. He is a self-employed artist whose work is greatly influenced by politics, and have been described as being "heavily influenced by author Octavia Butler’s Afrofuturist novels, most notably Parable of the Sower." In a 2013 interview, he said “I want my paintings to generate a discourse around policy, especially foreign policy." Baker's work has appeared in numerous exhibitions in Maryland, DC, New York, Connecticut, California, North Carolina, Dubai, and Japan, and he was a lecturer at the University of Maryland on drawing and two-dimensional design from 2012 to 2014. Baker previously coordinated a publicly funded mobile arts program for youth. He is a former artist-in-residence at 39th Street Gallery, a part of The Gateway Arts Center in Brentwood, Maryland. In 2023, he was a Trawick Prize finalist and an Artsy Foundations Prize finalist in 2024. Baker was a 2024-2025 Grant Wood Art Fellow and Visiting Assistant Professor in Art at the University of Iowa. Baker is currently an assistant professor at the School of the Art Institute Chicago (SAIC).

In discussing Baker's 2019 exhibition at Washington, DC's Hemphill Fine Arts, the reviewing art critic asserted that "Baker’s energetic and frenetic abstractions invoke a range of concerns, from the perils of living while black and the widening income gap to the proliferation of alternative facts and weaponized technology."

In June 2022, Baker took over as campaign manager of his father's gubernatorial campaign after his previous campaign manager, Andrew Mallinoff, stepped down. His father suspended his campaign later that month. In January 2023, Baker filed to run for the nomination to fill the vacancy left by Alonzo T. Washington in District 22 of the Maryland House of Delegates. On February 8, after Washington endorsed Baker's opponent Ashanti Martinez, Baker announced that he would no longer run for the vacancy.

Baker was a delegate to the 2024 Democratic National Convention, pledged to Kamala Harris.
