= Nancy Navarro =

Venezuelan-American politician in Maryland

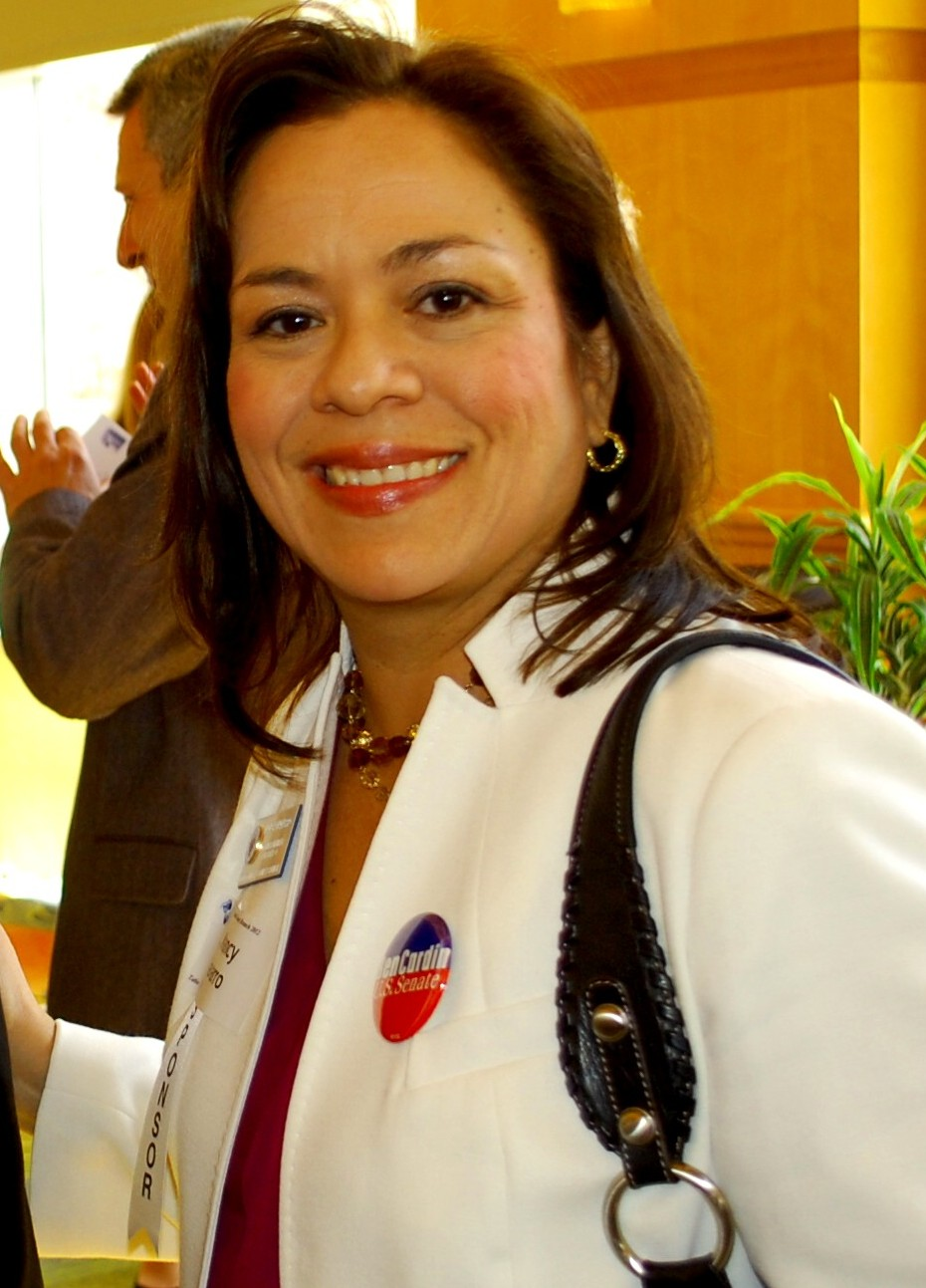

Member of the Montgomery County Council from the 4th district
- In office 2009 – December 5, 2022
- Preceded by: Donald Praisner
- Succeeded by: Kate Stewart

Personal details
- Born: August 15, 1965 (age 61) Caracas, Venezuela
- Party: Democratic
- Education: University of Missouri (BS)

Nancy Navarro (born August 15, 1965) is a Venezuelan-American politician and the first Latina county council member in Montgomery County, Maryland. She served on the county council from 2009 to 2022, representing District 4, the largest and most diverse district in the county.

Navarro was appointed to the President's Commission on Educational Excellence for Hispanics by President Barack Obama in 2011.

Navarro received international attention in March 2021 when two technicians were heard laughing at her accent during a virtual council meeting while she was speaking about inequitable distribution of the COVID-19 vaccination.

== Early life and education ==
Navarro was born in Caracas, Venezuela. She graduated from University of Missouri-Columbia with a Bachelor's of Science in Psychology.

== Career ==
Before running for public office, Navarro co-founded Centro Familia, a nonprofit organization whose mission was to assist the economic and early childhood educational development of Latino and other immigrant communities. She was elected to the Montgomery County Board of Education in 2004. She served five years on the Board of Education and held the offices of both President and Vice-President for two consecutive years.

Navarro was elected to Maryland's Montgomery County County council in a May 2009 special election. She is a Democrat who has championed legislation to protect small businesses located in areas affected by county-initiated redevelopment projects, increase racial equity & social justice, promote redevelopment in underserved areas of the county, increase economic development, and she also authored the county's comprehensive early care and Eeducation initiative.

In October 2011, President Barack Obama appointed Navarro as a member of the President's Commission on Educational Excellence for Hispanics, where she served on the Early Childhood Education Committee.

In 2013 and 2019, she served as president of the Montgomery County Council. In 2020, she opposed ballot questions B and D.

In 2022, Rushern Baker chose Navarro as his running mate in the Democratic primary of the 2022 Maryland gubernatorial election.

== Personal life ==
Navarro resides in Silver Spring, Maryland with her husband, Reginald, and their two daughters, Anais and Isabel.

== Awards and accolades ==
In 2007, Navarro was awarded the Hispanic Hero Award by the U.S. Hispanic Youth Entrepreneur Education. She is also a 2009 recipient of the Heart of the Community Award from the Community Teachers Institute. Additionally, she has received the Maryland State Department of Education "Women Who Dare" Leadership Award, and the Hispanic Chamber of Commerce of Montgomery County Leadership Award. In 2020, she was inducted into the County Women's History Archives. In 2021, Navarro was elected as a fellow of the National Academy of Public Administration.
