= Alonzo T. Washington =

American politician (born 1983)

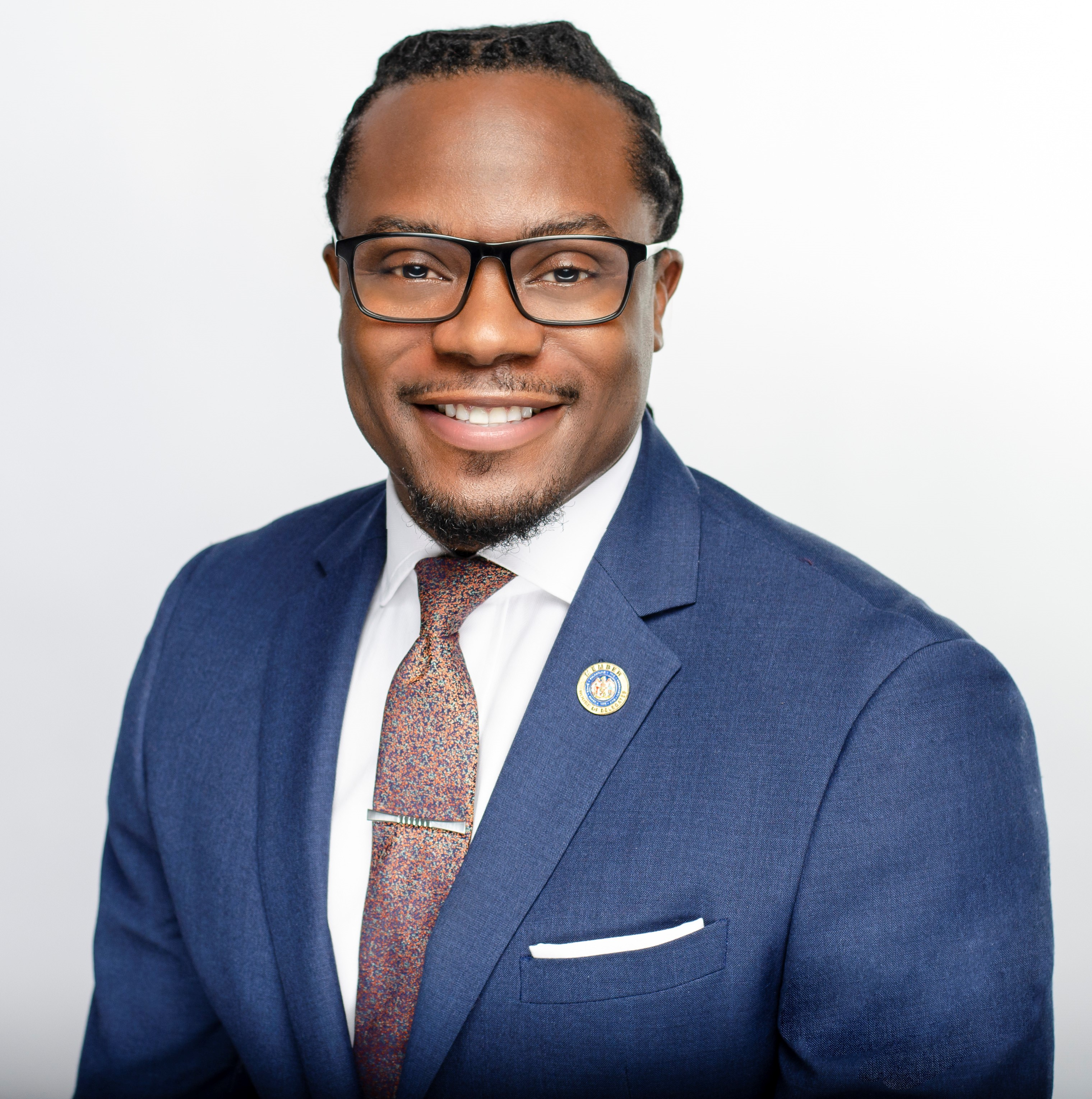
- Official portrait, 2023

Member of the Maryland Senate from the 22nd district
- Incumbent
- Assumed office January 30, 2023
- Appointed by: Wes Moore
- Preceded by: Paul G. Pinsky

Member of the Maryland House of Delegates from the 22nd district
- In office December 19, 2012 – January 27, 2023 Serving with Tawanna P. Gaines (2012–2019), Anne Healey (2012–2023), and Nicole A. Williams (2019–2023)
- Appointed by: Martin O'Malley
- Preceded by: Justin D. Ross
- Succeeded by: Ashanti Martinez

Personal details
- Born: Alonzo T. Washington; September 2, 1983 (age 43) Washington, D.C., U.S.
- Party: Democratic
- Profession: Politician

Alonzo T. Washington (born September 2, 1983) is an American politician, appointed to the Maryland Senate in 2023 to represent District 22, which covers Prince George's County. He previously represented the district in the Maryland House of Delegates from 2012 to 2023 after being appointed to the seat by Governor Martin O'Malley.

== Early life and career ==
Washington was born in Washington, D.C., and raised by his mother, Elizabeth Washington. When he was eight years old, he and his five siblings lived in a homeless shelter in College Park, Maryland. He graduated from Laurel High School in Laurel, Maryland. He was a member of both the track and football teams. Washington attended the University of Maryland, College Park, which he attended with help from the First Generation College Bound nonprofit, where he earned a bachelor's degree in criminal justice in 2007. While in college, he played football during his freshman year and was a member of the Alpha Phi Alpha fraternity. Washington is the first person in his family to graduate from both high school and college.

After graduating, Washington worked for the United States Conference of Catholic Bishops as a paralegal. In 2008, he moved to the Prince George's County Council and where he worked as a community liaison and chief of staff to Prince George's County councilmember William A. Campos.

Washington first got involved with politics in 2005 by becoming a member of the Prince George's County Young Democrats association. He was a member of the Prince George's County Democratic Central Committee from 2010 to 2014, serving as its secretary from 2012 to 2014. He has also been a member of the Roosevelt Democratic Club since 2012. After the resignation of Delegate Justin D. Ross, the Prince George's County Democratic Committee recommended Washington to the Governor to fill the vacated seat. Governor Martin O'Malley appointed Washington to fill the seat on December 4, 2012.

== In the legislature ==
Washington was sworn into the Maryland House of Delegates on December 19, 2012. He was a member of the Ways and Means Committee from 2013 to 2023, serving as its vice chair from 2020 to 2023 and as the chair of its election law and education subcommittees. Washington served as the House parliamentarian during the 2019 legislative session, and from 2020 to 2023, served as a member of the Rules and Executive Nominations Committee. He was also a member of the Prince George's County Delegation, Legislative Black Caucus of Maryland, Maryland Legislative Latino Caucus, and the Maryland Legislative Transit Caucus.

In 2016, Washington ran as an unpledged delegate to the 2016 Democratic National Convention. He received 2.0 percent of the vote in the Democratic primary election. Washington was a delegate to the 2024 Democratic National Convention, pledged to Kamala Harris.

In July 2020, Washington was appointed by Prince George's County executive Angela Alsobrooks to lead a task force to look at reforming the county's police department. The task force presented a list of recommendations in its final report on December 4, 2020, which included repealing the Law Enforcement Officers' Bill of Rights, getting rid of military equipment, and increasing police diversity and county residency; 46 of the plan's 50 recommendations were implemented.

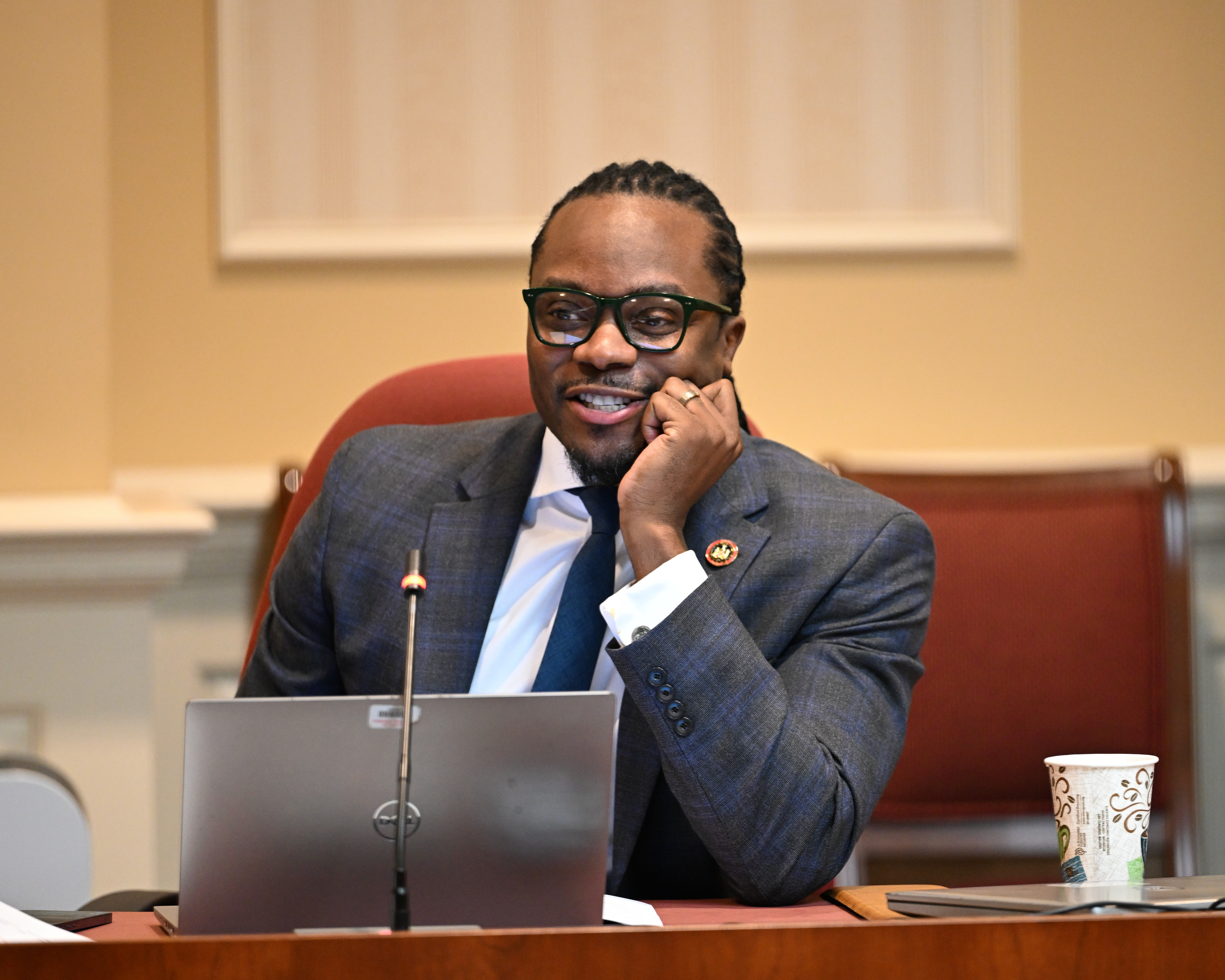
Washington in the Senate Finance Committee, 2025

In December 2022, Governor-elect Wes Moore nominated state senator Paul G. Pinsky to serve as the director of the Maryland Energy Administration. Washington filed to fill the vacancy left by Pinsky in the Maryland Senate later that month. On January 21, 2023, the Prince George's County Democratic Central Committee nominated Washington to serve the rest of Pinsky's term. On January 27, Moore appointed Washington to the Maryland Senate. He was sworn in on January 30, 2023, and was appointed to the Finance Committee. In October 2026, Senate president Bill Ferguson named Washington as the chair of the Senate Executive Nominations Committee.

On December 11, 2024, Washington announced that he would run for Prince George's County Executive in the 2025 special election to fill the remainder of Angela Alsobrooks's term. He was defeated in the Democratic primary election on March 4, 2025, placing fifth with 5.3% of the vote.

== Political positions ==
=== Alcohol ===
Washington introduced legislation in the 2017 legislative session that would allow movie theaters to sell alcoholic beverages under certain conditions. The bill received an unfavorable report from the Economic Matters committee.

=== Education ===
Washington introduced legislation in the 2015 legislative session that would create a college access pilot program for low-income students. The bill passed and became law on May 12, 2015.

Washington introduced legislation in the 2021 legislative session that would allow students to take a day off once every quarter for mental health reasons. The bill passed the Maryland House of Delegates by a vote of 131–1, but did not receive a vote in the Maryland Senate. He also introduced legislation that would allow teachers to instruct students remotely during the COVID-19 state of emergency if they hadn't been fully vaccinated for COVID-19. The bill passed but was vetoed by Governor Larry Hogan. The legislature voted to override his veto during the 2021 special legislative session.

=== Elections ===
Washington introduced legislation during the 2018 legislative session that would require social media companies to make more information about online political ads available to voters. The bill passed and became law on May 26, 2018. In August 2018, news media outlets including The Washington Post and The Baltimore Sun filed a lawsuit challenging the law, arguing that it created unfair burdens on media sites that publish such ads. Hearings for the case began on October 28, 2019.

Washington introduced legislation in the 2021 legislative session that would expand early voting center hours from 7 a.m. to 8 p.m. on each voting day. The bill passed and became law on May 30, 2021.

=== Healthcare ===
In 2018, Washington co-sponsored the Healthy Maryland Act, which would establish a single-payer healthcare system in Maryland.

=== Housing ===
Washington introduced legislation in the 2019 legislative session that would remove a state requirement that the Glenn Dale Hospital, which closed in 1981, be used as a continuing-care retirement community, potentially allowing for the property to be sold to housing developers. The bill passed and became law on April 18, 2019.

=== Government ===
Washington introduced legislation in the 2014 legislative session that would prohibit the Prince George's County Board of Education from issuing credit cards to its members. Afterwards, the Board of Education voted unanimously to ban its members from having county-issued credit cards.

Washington introduced legislation during the 2015 legislative session that would establish an inspector general's office responsible for investigating and examining complaints about public schools.

Washington introduced legislation during the 2021 legislative session that would require the Maryland Senate to approve the governor's nominee for state superintendent. The bill passed the House of Delegates by a vote of 98-40, but did not receive a vote in the Senate.

=== Policing ===
Washington introduced legislation in the 2021 legislative session that would expand the required training for school resource officers to include restorative approaches. The bill passed in the House of Delegates by a vote of 93-42, but did not receive a vote in the Senate.

=== Taxes ===
Washington introduced legislation in the 2022 legislative session that would exempt diabetic care products from the sales and use tax. The bill passed and became law on April 1, 2022.

== Electoral history ==
Maryland House of Delegates District 22 Democratic primary election, 2014
| Party | Candidate | Votes | % |
|---|---|---|---|
| Democratic | Alonzo T. Washington (incumbent) | 7,504 | 31.6 |
| Democratic | Tawanna P. Gaines (incumbent) | 6,284 | 26.5 |
| Democratic | Anne Healey (incumbent) | 6,117 | 25.8 |
| Democratic | Rushern Baker IV | 3,840 | 16.2 |

Maryland House of Delegates District 22 election, 2014
| Party | Candidate | Votes | % |
|---|---|---|---|
| Democratic | Tawanna P. Gaines (incumbent) | 19,174 | 31.9 |
| Democratic | Alonzo T. Washington (incumbent) | 18,677 | 31.1 |
| Democratic | Anne Healey (incumbent) | 18,214 | 30.3 |
| Republican | Lynn White | 3,910 | 6.5 |
| Write-in | | 140 | 0.2 |

Male Delegates to the Democratic National Convention election, District 5, 2016
| Party | Candidate | Votes | % |
|---|---|---|---|
| Democratic | Timothy J. Adams (Clinton) | 65,780 | 14.0 |
| Democratic | Jay Walker (Clinton) | 61,332 | 13.0 |
| Democratic | Mel Franklin (Clinton) | 61,234 | 13.0 |
| Democratic | Jaime Contreras (Clinton) | 59,905 | 12.7 |
| Democratic | Russell Yates (Clinton) | 58,269 | 12.4 |
| Democratic | Darius Baxter (Sanders) | 30,579 | 6.5 |
| Democratic | Colin Byrd (Sanders) | 28,733 | 6.1 |
| Democratic | Babatunde Alegbeleye (Sanders) | 27,922 | 5.9 |
| Democratic | J. Darrell Carrington (Sanders) | 27,498 | 5.8 |
| Democratic | Paul G. Pinsky (Sanders) | 27,490 | 5.8 |
| Democratic | Alonzo T. Washington (Uncommitted) | 9,600 | 2.0 |
| Democratic | John Coller (Uncommitted) | 6,550 | 1.4 |
| Democratic | Brendan J. Benge (Uncommitted) | 6,009 | 1.3 |

Maryland House of Delegates District 22 Democratic primary election, 2018
| Party | Candidate | Votes | % |
|---|---|---|---|
| Democratic | Alonzo T. Washington (incumbent) | 10,739 | 31.2 |
| Democratic | Tawanna P. Gaines (incumbent) | 8,615 | 25.0 |
| Democratic | Anne Healey (incumbent) | 6,853 | 19.9 |
| Democratic | Nicole A. Williams | 4,761 | 13.8 |
| Democratic | Ashanti Martinez | 3,486 | 10.1 |

Maryland House of Delegates District 22 election, 2018
| Party | Candidate | Votes | % |
|---|---|---|---|
| Democratic | Tawanna P. Gaines (incumbent) | 29,461 | 33.6 |
| Democratic | Alonzo T. Washington (incumbent) | 27,401 | 31.2 |
| Democratic | Anne Healey (incumbent) | 26,209 | 29.9 |
| Republican | Winnie Obike | 4,416 | 5.0 |
| Write-in | | 278 | 0.3 |

Maryland House of Delegates District 22 Democratic primary election, 2022
| Party | Candidate | Votes | % |
|---|---|---|---|
| Democratic | Alonzo T. Washington (incumbent) | 9,809 | 30.4 |
| Democratic | Nicole A. Williams (incumbent) | 8,250 | 25.5 |
| Democratic | Anne Healey (incumbent) | 5,280 | 16.3 |
| Democratic | Ashanti Martinez | 4,494 | 13.9 |
| Democratic | Patrick A. Paschall | 2,510 | 7.8 |
| Democratic | Chiquita Jackson | 1,967 | 6.1 |

Maryland House of Delegates District 22 election, 2022
| Party | Candidate | Votes | % |
|---|---|---|---|
| Democratic | Alonzo T. Washington (incumbent) | 21,165 | 34.5 |
| Democratic | Nicole A. Williams (incumbent) | 20,311 | 33.1 |
| Democratic | Anne Healey (incumbent) | 19,036 | 31.0 |
| Write-in | | 896 | 1.5 |
