= Ashanti Martinez =

American politician (born 1996)

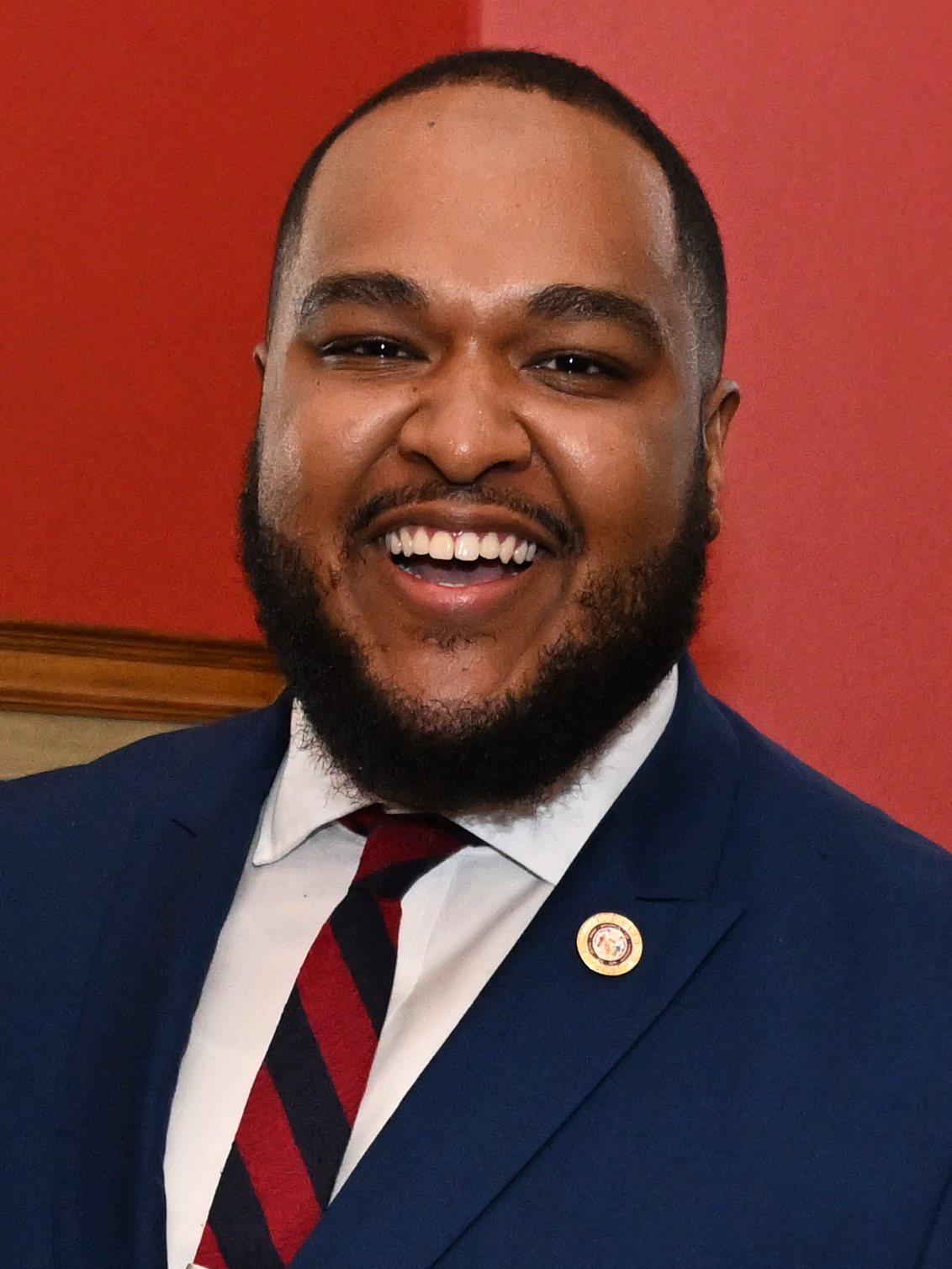
- Martinez in 2023

Member of the Maryland House of Delegates from the 22nd district
- Incumbent
- Assumed office February 24, 2023 Serving with Anne Healey and Nicole A. Williams
- Appointed by: Wes Moore
- Preceded by: Alonzo T. Washington

Personal details
- Born: Ashanti F. Martinez; April 25, 1996 (age 30) Washington, D.C., U.S.
- Party: Democratic
- Education: Howard University
- Website: Campaign website

Ashanti F. Martinez (born April 25, 1996) is an American politician who has served as a member of the Maryland House of Delegates from District 22 in Prince George's County, since 2023. A member of the Democratic Party, he was appointed to the seat by Governor Wes Moore to fill a vacancy left by the appointment of Alonzo T. Washington to the Maryland Senate.

== Early life and education ==
Ashanti F. Martinez was born on April 25, 1996, in Washington, D.C. He grew up in a working-class family and was educated at Parkdale High School. Martinez graduated from Howard University with a bachelor's degree in political science in 2018.

== Political career ==
=== Early political career ===
Martinez first got involved with politics when he was 14 years old as a member of the Prince George's County Young Democrats. In 2016, Martinez worked on the congressional campaign of state delegate Joseline Peña-Melnyk. After graduating from Howard University, he worked as the director of constituent services for Prince George's County councilmember Tom Dernoga. He then worked as a research and policy analyst for CASA de Maryland. Martinez also worked as an intern for U.S. Representatives Elijah Cummings and Steny Hoyer, an aide to the Maryland Legislative Latino Caucus, and as a campaign manager for Arkansas House of Representatives candidate Vivian Flowers.

In April 2017, Martinez announced that he would run for the Maryland House of Delegates in District 22. He was defeated in the Democratic primary, placing fifth with 10.1 percent of the vote.

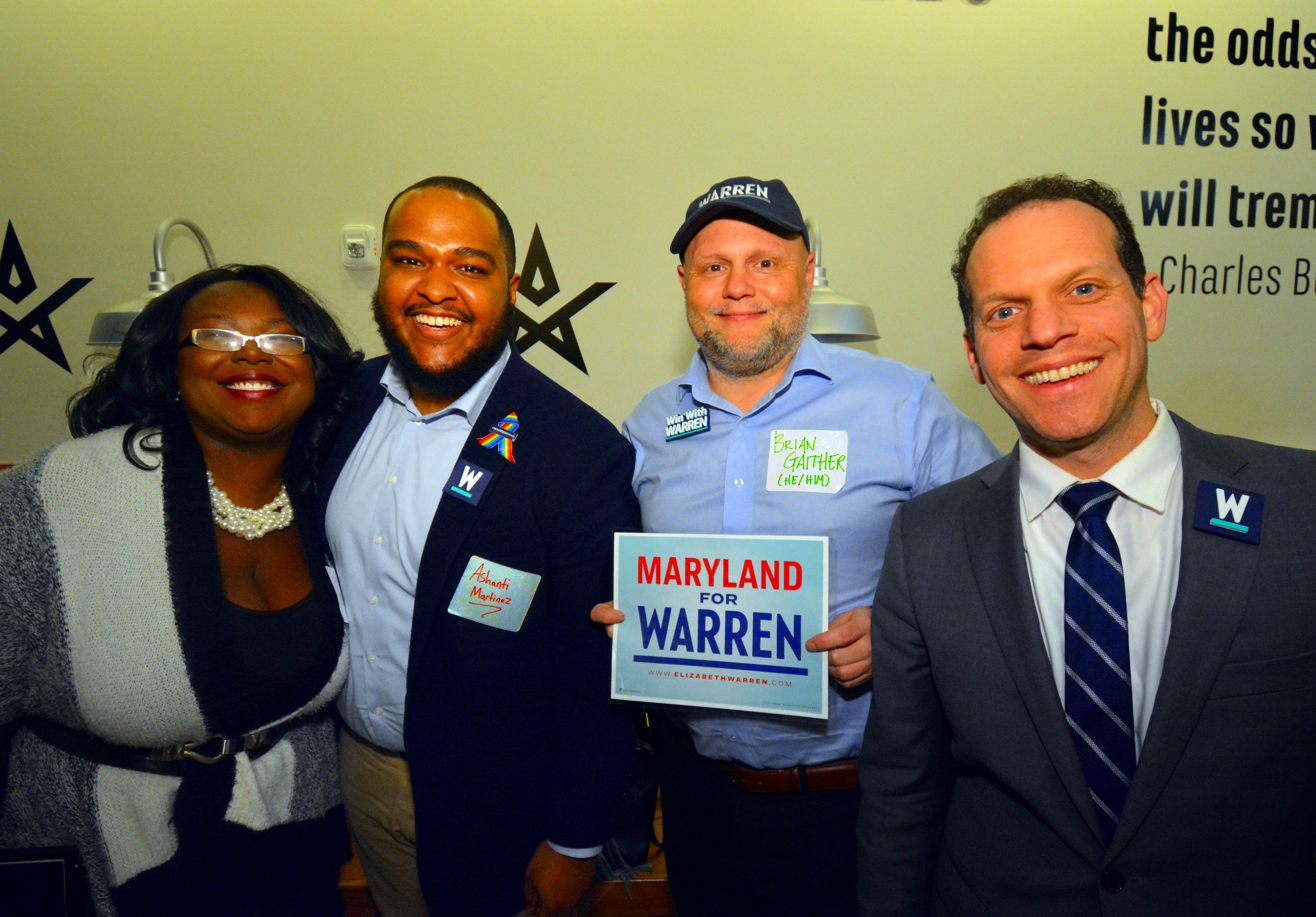
Martinez (center left) at an Elizabeth Warren rally, 2020

In August 2021, Martinez announced that he would again run for the Maryland House of Delegates in District 22, challenging incumbent state delegate Anne Healey. During the primary, he ran on a platform of improving education, transportation, infrastructure, health care, criminal justice reform, and the environment. He also ran on the issue of abortion, highlighting Healey's opposition to abortion rights. Martinez received endorsements from Pro-Choice Maryland Action and CASA de Maryland. Martinez came in fourth place in the Democratic primary, receiving 13.91 percent of the vote. Following his defeat, he became chief of staff for Prince George's County councilmember Krystal Oriadha.

=== Maryland House of Delegates ===
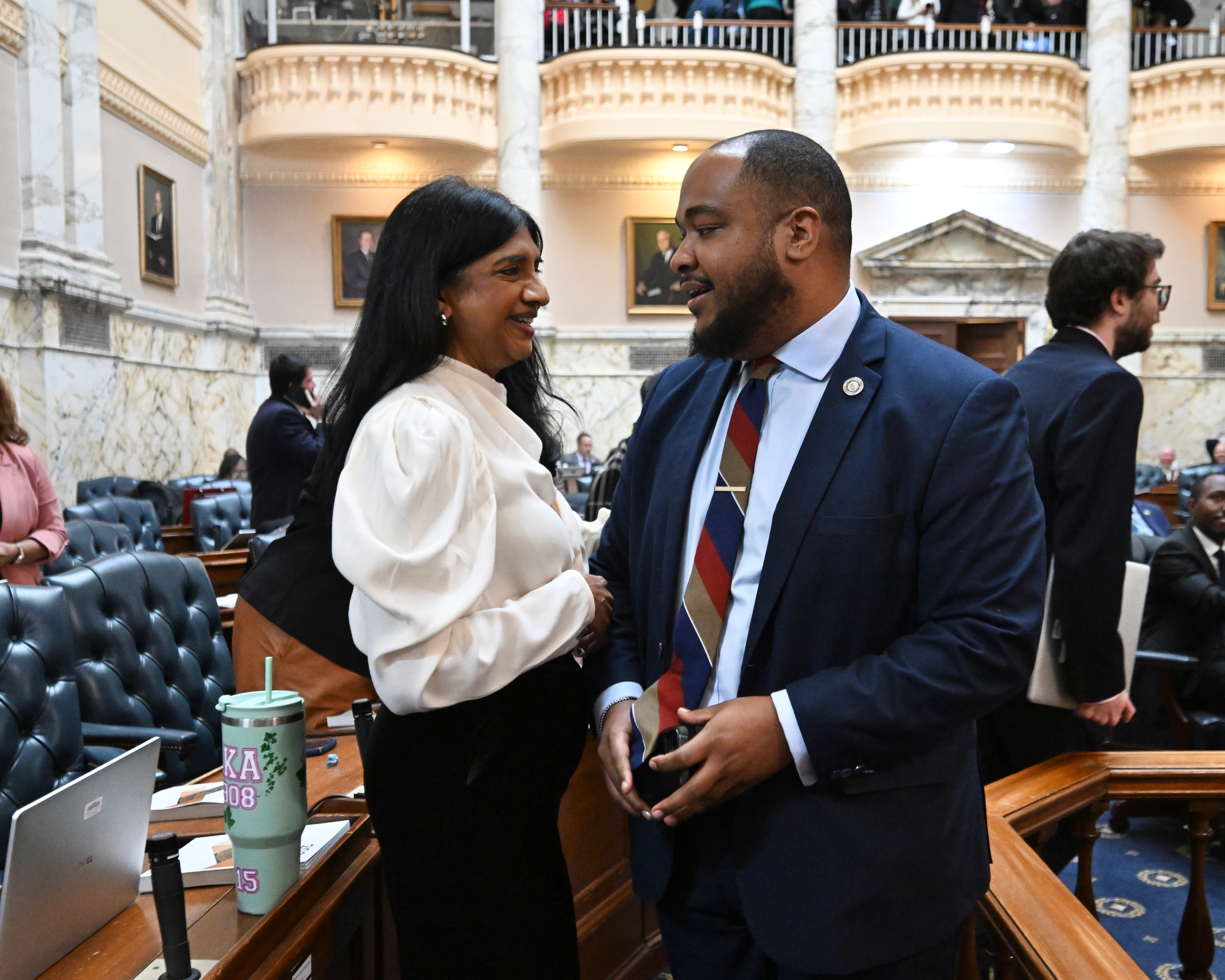
Martinez and Lieutenant Governor Aruna Miller on the House floor, 2025

In January 2023, Martinez filed to run for the nomination to fill the vacancy left by Alonzo T. Washington in District 22 of the Maryland House of Delegates. He was the only one to apply to the open seat and was nominated by the Prince George's County Democratic Central Committee on February 9.

Martinez was into the Maryland House of Delegates on February 24, 2023. He is a member of the House Health and Government Operations Committee. He is the first Latino to represent District 22, and the first openly gay person to represent Prince George's County in the Maryland General Assembly. In December 2025, House Speaker Joseline Peña-Melnyk named Martinez as the House majority whip, succeeding Jazz Lewis, who resigned following the 2025 special legislative session.

== Political positions ==
=== Environment ===
In May 2022, Martinez signed a Chesapeake Climate Action Network resolution to move Maryland to 100 percent carbon-free electricity by 2035 and to remove trash incineration from the state's "clean energy" classification.

=== Gun control ===
In June 2021, Martinez attended and spoke at a rally against gun violence in Landover, Maryland.

=== Health care ===
Martinez supports universal health care.

=== Immigration ===
During the 2026 legislative session, Martinez supported a bill to prohibit counties from entering into 287(g) program agreements with U.S. Immigration and Customs Enforcement.

=== Israel–Palestine ===
In January 2024, Martinez attended and spoke at a rally at the Maryland State House to support a resolution calling on Maryland's congressional delegation to support a ceasefire in the Gaza war. During the 2026 legislative session, he supported the Not On Our Dime Act, which would require the Maryland Secretary of State to remove nonprofit organizations from the state's Registry of Charitable Solicitation if they knowingly support Israeli settlement activity.

=== National politics ===
In October 2021, Martinez spoke in support of the Build Back Better Act.

In April 2025, Martinez attended and spoke at a rally protesting the deportation of Kilmar Abrego Garcia, saying that he believed that there was a "constitutional crisis" in the country and faulting Donald Trump for failing to do "not just the right thing, the moral thing".

=== Social issues ===
In May 2022, Martinez attended the Lets Say Gay Parade at the University of Maryland, College Park, where he spoke in support of the Trans Health Equity Act, a bill that would require the state's Medicaid program to provide coverage for gender-affirming treatment. In May 2023, he and delegate Gabriel Acevero signed onto a letter condemning the censure of two transgender legislators—Zooey Zephyr and Mauree Turner—in Montana and Oklahoma. During the 2026 legislative session, Martinez introduced the Birth Certificate Modernization Act, which would allow "X" as a non-binary option on birth certificates.

Martinez supports bringing the new Federal Bureau of Investigation headquarters to Prince George's County.

During the 2026 legislative session, Martinez introduced a bill that would impose a tax on large social media companies that would be used to fund children's mental health programs in Maryland.

=== Transportation ===
In July 2025, Martinez supported the Federal Railroad Administration's cancellation of federal grants to study a proposed Maglev train between Washington, D.C. and Baltimore, saying that thousands would have been displaced and disconnected "in the name of a project that served too few and risked too much".

== Personal life ==
Martinez is openly gay, coming out to his family at age 13. He lives in New Carrollton, Maryland.

== Electoral history ==
Maryland House of Delegates District 22 Democratic primary election, 2018
Party	Candidate	Votes	%
Democratic	Alonzo T. Washington (incumbent)	10,739	31.2
Democratic	Tawanna P. Gaines (incumbent)	8,615	25.0
Democratic	Anne Healey (incumbent)	6,853	19.9
Democratic	Nicole A. Williams	4,761	13.8
Democratic	Ashanti Martinez	3,486	10.1

Maryland House of Delegates District 22 Democratic primary election, 2022
Party	Candidate	Votes	%
Democratic	Alonzo T. Washington (incumbent)	9,809	30.4
Democratic	Nicole A. Williams (incumbent)	8,250	25.5
Democratic	Anne Healey (incumbent)	5,280	16.3
Democratic	Ashanti Martinez	4,494	13.9
Democratic	Patrick A. Paschall	2,510	7.8
Democratic	Chiquita Jackson	1,967	6.1
