= Justin Ross =

American politician (born 1976)

Justin D. Ross
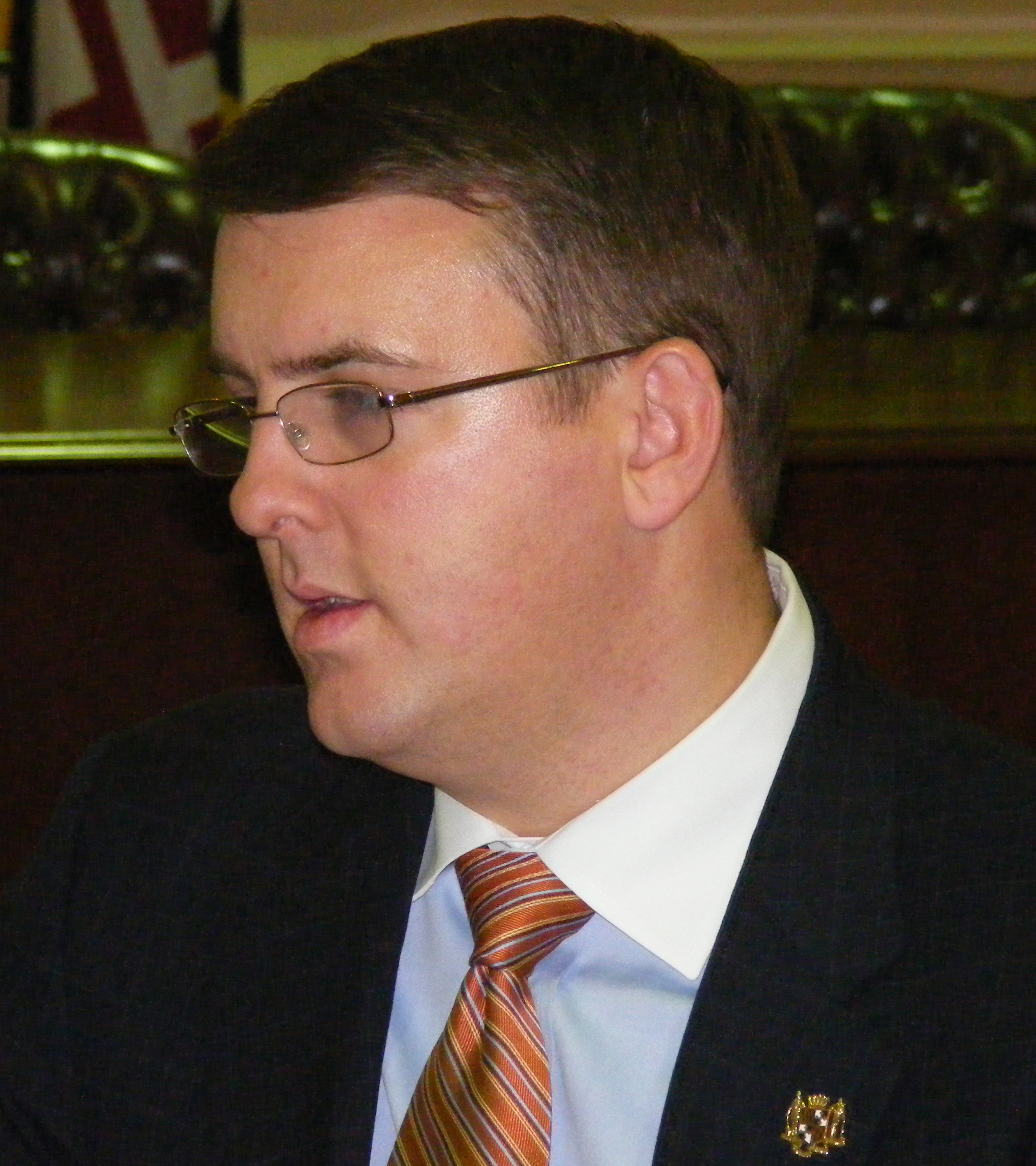
- Ross in 2007

Member of the Maryland House of Delegates from the 22nd district
- In office January 8, 2003 – November 9, 2012
- Succeeded by: Alonzo T. Washington

Personal details
- Born: April 18, 1976 (age 50) Bowie, Maryland
- Party: Democratic

Justin D. Ross (born April 18, 1976) is an American politician who served in the Maryland House of Delegates from 2003 to 2012. He was first elected to the House in 2002 to represent District 22, which covers Prince George's County.

Ross retired from the House of Delegates in November 2012. Ross served as a top lieutenant to Maryland House Speaker Michael E. Busch. In his roles as Chief Deputy Majority Whip from 2006-2012, Ross is widely credited in delivering the last minute votes needed to pass marriage equality in February 2012. Later that September during a rare special session of the Maryland Legislature, Ross again was able to help secure the votes for legislation that allowed for MGM National Harbor to open in Prince George's County. He was given the nickname "Mr. 71" (the number of votes needed to pass a bill) by then Speaker Michael Busch for his ability to secure the votes in the Maryland House of Delegates.

On July 1, 2013, Justin joined with Timothy A. Perry, Josh White and Jonas A. Jacobson to form the Annapolis government relations firm of Perry, White Ross & Jacobson. PWRJ quickly became among the very elite of government relations firms in Maryland. On July 1, 2021, Ross left PWRJ and began a new role as Senior Vice President for Global Programming for Next Level Sports & Entertainment (NLSE). NLSE is the only Black-owned sports network in the world is available in approximately 30 Million US Homes on providers such as Verizon Fios, Direct TV, AT&T, Fubo, & Distro.

== Background ==
Ross was born in Prince George's County, Maryland to David G. and Jane L. Ross, on April 18, 1976. Ross attended the public schools of Prince George's County and graduated from Eleanor Roosevelt High School in 1994, where he wrestled and was the County champion at 145 lbs. Ross matriculated to the University of Maryland, College Park and received his B.A. in government and politics in 1998. Ross earned his M.S. n Real Estate Development from the Ed St. John School of Business at Johns Hopkins University.

== Career ==
After graduating from college, Ross became a real estate broker. He spent more than a decade as an associate at NAI Michael Companies, working on all aspects of commercial property development and leasing. He then served as vice president of the AFL-CIO Investment Trust Corporation.

On July 1, 2013, Justin joined with Timothy A. Perry, Josh White and Jonas A. Jacobson to form the Annapolis government relations firm of Perry, White Ross & Jacobson. On July 1, 2013, Justin joined with Timothy A. Perry, Josh White and Jonas A. Jacobson to form the Annapolis government relations firm of Perry, White Ross & Jacobson. PWRJ quickly became among the very elite of government relations firms in Maryland. On July 1, 2021, Ross left PWRJ and began a new role as Senior Vice President for Global Programming for Next Level Sports & Entertainment (NLSE). NLSE is the only Black-owned sports network in the world is available in approximately 30 Million US Homes on providers such as Verizon Fios, Direct TV, AT&T, Fubo, & Distro.

Ross is also a partner in the Prince George's County based commercial real estate development firm RISE IP along with partner Brad Frome.

== In the legislature ==
Ross began serving in the House of Delegates on January 8, 2003. He served on the House Ways and Means Committee and its election law and revenues subcommittees where he spent his entire career. In 2005, Ross helped lead the successful effort that required Prince George's County liquor stores to close at midnight (instead of 2am) and increased fines for penalties for stores that were poorly run. During the 2007 session of the Maryland General Assembly, Delegate Ross sponsored HB554 which was cross-filed with State Senator Gwendolyn Britt. These bills both sought to allow specified convicted felons, who have been released and completed their conditions of parole and probation, the right to vote. The legislation passed both houses and was signed into law by Governor O'Malley. In 2011, Ross, as Chairman of the County Affairs Committee, shepherded then-Prince George's County Executive Rushern Baker's ethics reform legislation through the Maryland General Assembly.

Ross is widely credited in delivering the last minute votes needed to pass Marriage Equality in February 2012. Later that September, during a rare special session of the Maryland Legislature, Ross again was able to help secure the final votes for legislation that allowed for MGM National Harbor to open in Prince George's County. He was given the nickname "Mr. 71" (the number of votes needed to pass a bill) by former Speaker Michael Busch for his ability to secure the votes in the Maryland House of Delegates.

=== Legislative notes ===
- voted for the Healthy Air Act in 2006 (SB154)
- voted against slots in 2005 (HB1361)
- voted in favor of the Tax Reform Act of 2007(HB2)
- voted in favor of "Dream Act" in-state tuition for students who attended Maryland highschools for at least 2 years. (HB6)(2007)
- sponsored House Bill 30 in 2007, Establishing the Maryland Education Fund.House Bill 30

== Awards ==
- 2010 Most Influential Maryland Legislators (Top 20)
