= Paul G. Pinsky =

American politician (born 1950)

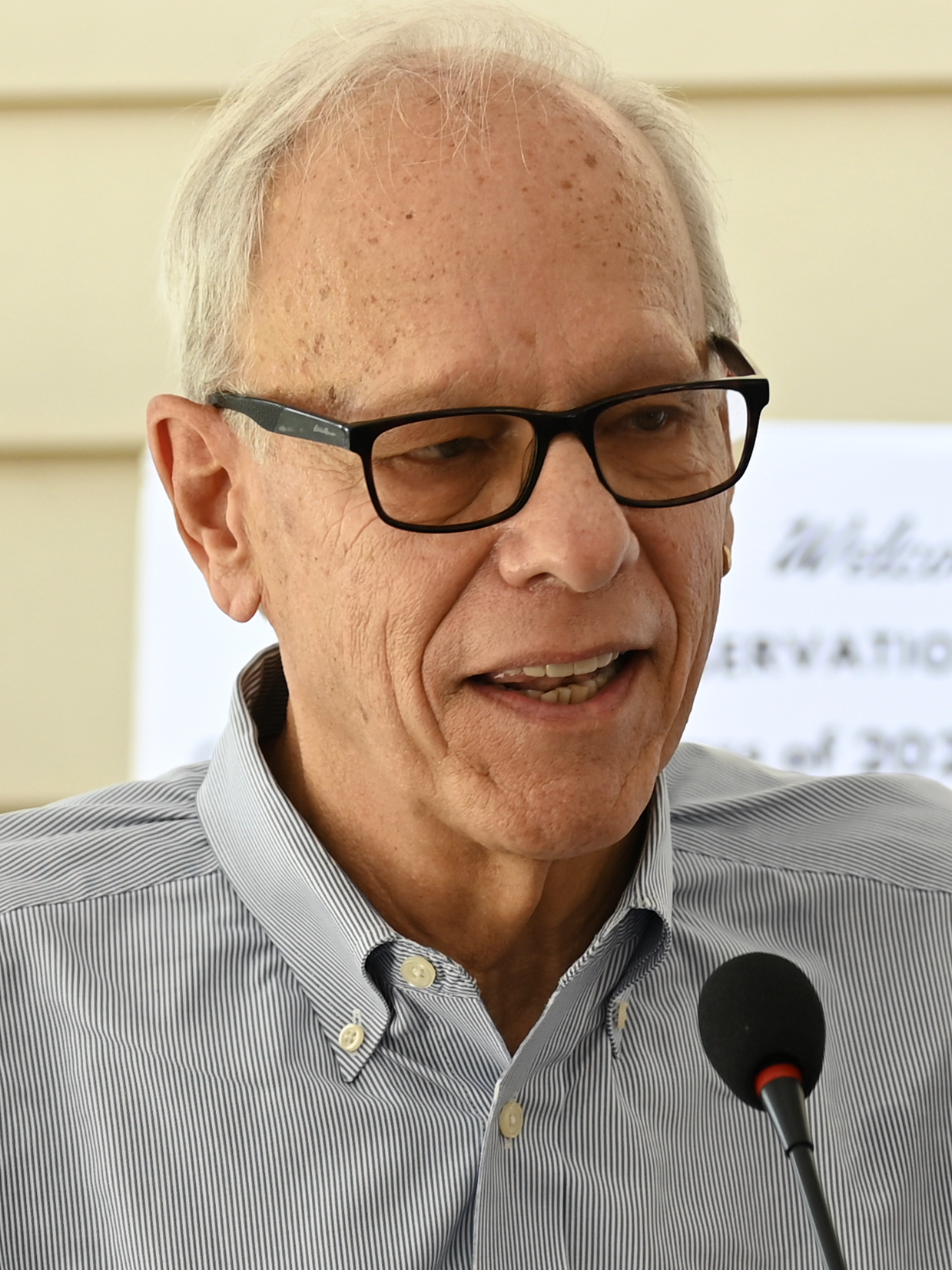

Director of the Maryland Energy Administration
- In office January 18, 2023 – November 21, 2025
- Appointed by: Wes Moore
- Preceded by: Mary Beth Tung
- Succeeded by: Ian Ullman (acting)

Member of the Maryland Senate from the 22nd district
- In office August 2, 1994 – January 18, 2023
- Preceded by: Thomas P. O'Reilly
- Succeeded by: Alonzo T. Washington

Member of the Maryland House of Delegates from the 22nd district
- In office January 14, 1987 – August 2, 1994
- Preceded by: David Bird; Frank Pesci
- Succeeded by: Rushern Baker

Personal details
- Born: March 5, 1950 (age 76) Camden, New Jersey, U.S.
- Party: Democratic
- Spouse: Joan Rothgeb (died 2020)
- Children: 2 daughters
- Occupation: Teacher and union organizer

Paul G. Pinsky (born March 5, 1950) is an American educator and politician who served as the Director of the Maryland Energy Administration from 2023 to 2025. A member of the Democratic Party, he previously served in the Maryland Senate from 1994 to 2023, and the Maryland House of Delegates from 1987 to 1994, representing District 22 in Prince George's County.

== Early life and education ==
Pinsky was born in Camden, New Jersey on March 5, 1950, where he attended Moorestown Friends School. He left New Jersey to attend George Washington University in Washington, D.C., where he earned a B.A. degree in public affairs in 1972. While at GWU, Pinsky attended protests in Washington, D.C. that opposed the Vietnam War and the apartheid in South Africa and supporting women's rights. He and his wife attended a national labor demonstration in the 1980s. After graduating, Pinsky worked as an educator for Prince George's County Public Schools from 1976 to 1995 and worked as an organizer for the Maryland State Teachers Association until 2014. From 1983 to 1987, he served as president of the Prince George's County Educators' Association, a labor union that represents over 6,000 professional school employees.

Pinsky has been a member of Progressive Maryland since 2001.

== Maryland General Assembly ==
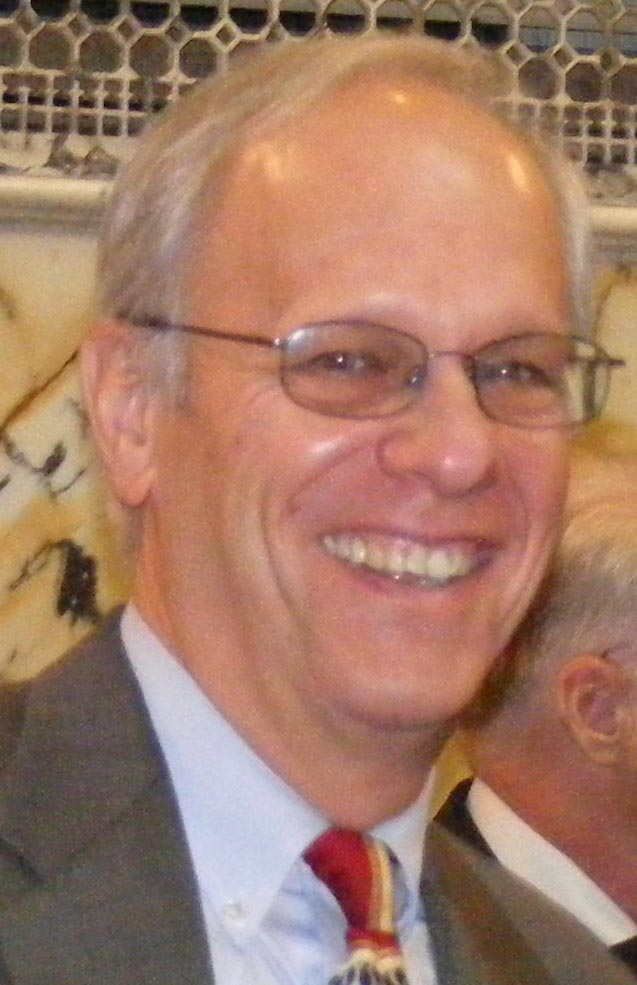
Pinsky in the Maryland Senate, 2008

Pinsky was a member of the Maryland General Assembly from 1987 to 2023, first being elected to the Maryland House of Delegates in 1986, after defeating incumbent David Bird in the Democratic primary election.

In 1990, after Burlington mayor Bernie Sanders was elected to the U.S. House of Representatives, Pinsky was one of a handful of progressives asked to organize a "Welcome to D.C. " event for Sanders. Pinsky later served as a delegate to the 2016 Democratic National Convention, pledged to Sanders.

In 1994, Pinsky challenged incumbent Democratic senator Thomas P. O'Reilly. During the primary election, O'Reilly resigned from the state senate to take an appointed post on the state Workers' Compensation Commission. Following his resignation, Democratic Party officials and aides of Senate President Thomas V. "Mike" Miller sought to appoint someone other than Pinsky to fill his vacancy, worrying that he would be "too liberal" and not enough of a team player. Pinsky was appointed to serve the rest of his term. He defeated Hyattsville city councilmember Charles J. Kenny Jr. in the Democratic primary, receiving 74 percent of the vote.

Pinsky was a member of the Maryland Senate from 1994 to 2023. At the time of his resignation in January 2023, he was the longest serving member of the Maryland Senate. Following the resignation of Senate President Thomas Miller in October 2019, Pinsky explored a run for senate president.

In February 2019, Maryland Republicans condemned comments made by Pinsky during a debate on a bill that would return control of school calendars to local school boards as an effort to link governor Larry Hogan to former Alabama governor George Wallace. In an interview later, Pinsky said that he had nothing to apologize for, saying "If the senator conjures something in his head, so be it."

=== Committee assignments ===
Maryland Senate

- Chair, Education, Health and Environmental Affairs Committee, 2019–2023 (vice-chair, 2015–2019; member, 1994–2023; health subcommittee, 1994–2002; licensing & regulatory affairs subcommittee, 1999–2002; ethics & election law subcommittee, 2003–2006; special committee on renewables & clean energy, 2007–2010; chair, education subcommittee, 2003–2023, member, 1998–2023; co-chair, environment subcommittee, 2011–2014, 2017–2018, chair, 2007–2010, member, 2015–2023)
- Chair, Executive Nominations Committee, 2019–2023; Rules Committee, 2019–2023
- Chair, Legislative Policy Committee, 2019–2023
- Chair, Joint COVID-19 Response Legislative Work Group, 2020–2023
- Member, Joint Committee on Federal Relations, 1995–2003
- Member, Special Committee on Substance Abuse, 2001–2013
- Member, Senate Special Commission on Medical Malpractice Liability Insurance, 2004
- Member, Joint Committee on the Selection of the State Treasurer, 2007
- Senate Chair, Joint Committee on Administrative, Executive and Legislative Review, 2003–2015 (member, 1999–2003)

House of Delegates

- Member, Environmental Matters Committee, 1987–1994.

=== Other memberships ===
- Senate Chair, Prince George's County Delegation, 2001–2003
- Member, Maryland Green Caucus, 1996–2023
- Maryland Bicycle and Pedestrian Caucus, 2003–2023
- Maryland Educators Caucus, 2005–2023
- Member, National Conference of State Legislatures (agriculture, environment & energy committee, 2007–2008; agriculture & energy committee, 2008–2023; education committee, 2008–2023; environment committee, 2008–2023)
- Member, Southern Legislative Conference (energy & environment committee, 2008–2023)

== Moore administration ==
In December 2022, governor-elect Wes Moore named Pinsky to serve as the director of the Maryland Energy Administration (MEA). During his tenure, the MEA played a more central role in the Moore administration's clean energy and climate strategies, launching programs to expand community solar and supporting efforts to develop offshore wind farms in Maryland. In November 2025, Pinsky announced that he would step down from his role at the end of the month. He was succeeded by Kelly Speakes-Backman, who served as principal deputy assistant secretary for the Office of Energy Efficiency and Renewable Energy from 2021 to 2022.

== Political positions ==
Pinsky has been described as one of the most liberal members of the Maryland legislature. He has gained a reputation as a champion of progressive causes, especially in relation to education and the environment.

=== Abortion ===
In 1988, Pinsky voted in favor of an amendment to an abortion bill that would have loosened the restrictions on Medicaid-financing of abortions. In 1991, he voted in favor of a bill that would keep abortion legal in Maryland.

=== COVID-19 pandemic ===
In May 2020, Pinsky sharply criticized Governor Hogan for his administration's acquisition of incomplete COVID-19 testing kits from South Korea. During the 2021 legislative session, Pinsky supported legislation introduced by senator Clarence Lam that would set new rules for emergency procurements. The bill passed and became law following a gubernatorial veto override on December 6, 2021.

=== Education ===
Pinsky introduced legislation during the 2001 legislative session that would ban advertising in schools and prevent schools from entering into exclusive agreement with snack companies. The bill was killed in the Senate, where legislators voted 26–18 to bar the proposal from coming to the Senate floor.

Pinsky introduced legislation during the 2002 legislative session that would dismantle the elected school board of Prince George's County and replace it with an all-appointed panel that would serve for four years, and replace the position of superintendent and replace it with a chief executive officer.

Pinsky introduced legislation during the 2005 legislative session that would implement new limitations on sugary snacks in schools and require that schools attach timers to in-school vending machines that would shut them down automatically.

Pinsky introduced legislation during the 2016 legislative session that would give legislators a role in selecting the state superintendent. The bill was withdrawn after its sponsors determined that it did not have enough support in the Maryland Senate to withstand a veto from Governor Hogan.

Pinsky introduced legislation in the 2018 legislative session that would provide tuition-free community college for families that make less than $150,000 a year. The bill passed and was signed into law by Governor Hogan on May 4, 2018.

During the 2019 legislative session, Pinsky led a three-year effort of getting the Maryland General Assembly to pass the Kirwan Commission's reforms of public schools. In February, Pinsky voted down a bill that would expand the number of schools that can participate in the state's P-TECH program, saying that the program needed to be studied more before it could be expanded. He also supported a bill that would overturn Governor Hogan's mandate requiring schools to start after Labor Day. In April, he supported a bill that would provide an additional $700 million in funding for Maryland public schools over two years.

Pinsky introduced legislation in the 2022 legislative session that would ensure access to high-quality course and extracurricular offerings to students of virtual schools, requires teachers of a virtual class to be employees of the county, and cap the number of students from a single school to attend the county's virtual school to 10 percent.

=== Elections ===
Pinsky previously introduced legislation that would have decreased the number of signatures an independent candidate would need to make it on a ballot.

In 2016, Pinsky proposed turning control over redistricting to a commission made up of legislative appointees provided that Republican states do the same.

Pinsky introduced legislation in the 2018 legislative session that would require presidential candidates to release their tax returns to appear on the ballot in Maryland.

Pinsky introduced legislation in the 2020 legislative session that would have created a ballot initiative that, if passed, would allowed gubernatorial candidates to select their running mate following the primary election.

Pinsky introduced legislation in the 2021 legislative session that would create a tiered system for using public funds to match qualifying gubernatorial campaign contributions through the state's Fair Campaign Finance Fund. The bill passed and became law on May 30, 2021.

During the 2021 special legislative session, Pinsky dismissed criticisms from Republicans that accused Maryland Democrats of passing congressional maps of using gerrymandering to draw a map that heavily favors the Democrats, saying that if Republicans opposed gerrymandering, they should support the federal For the People Act. In August 2021, Pinsky attended a rally outside the U.S. Capitol with hundreds of state legislators to pressure the United States Senate to pass the For the People Act.

During the 2022 legislative session, Pinsky introduced legislation that would give candidates the option of receiving public contributions from the state's Fair Campaign Financing Fund if they meet certain low-dollar fundraising thresholds and agree to spending limitations. He also supported legislation that would require vacancies in the Maryland General Assembly to be filled using special elections instead of gubernatorial appointments.

=== Environment ===
In 2008, Pinsky introduced the Global Warming Solutions Act, which requires that greenhouse gases be cut by 90 percent from all businesses in the state by 2050. An amendment introduced by senator Nathaniel Exum and backed by the administration of Governor Martin O'Malley weakened the bill's function by making this an advisory goal.

In 2011, Pinsky was arrested at a civil disobedience protest in front of the White House against the construction of an oil pipeline.

In 2016, Pinsky introduced the Greenhouse Gas Emissions Reduction Act, which requires the state to cut its greenhouse gases by 40 percent of its 2006 levels by 2030. The bill passed and was signed into law by Governor Hogan on April 13, 2016.

In 2017, Pinsky attended an activist rally outside of the Maryland State House to promote legislation that would ban hydraulic fracking in Maryland.

In 2021, Pinsky introduced the Climate Solutions Now Act, which would increase the state's goal of cutting carbon emissions from a 40 percent reduction from its 2006 levels to a 60 percent cut by 2030. He was critical of an amended version of the bill that reduced the reduction goal to 50 percent introduced by leaders of the Maryland House of Delegates, arguing that the changes "reflect a lack of urgency the leadership in the House of Delegates feels about confronting climate change". After negotiations on Pinsky's bill broke down in the final weeks of the legislative session, Pinsky tried to tack the bill's priorities onto other separate bills. Negotiations on a climate bill continued following the end of the legislative session. Pinsky reintroduced the legislation during the 2022 legislative session, promising alongside delegate Kumar Barve to move quickly on passing the bill to override a gubernatorial veto.

On its 2021 legislative scorecard, the Maryland League of Conservation Voters gave Pinsky a score of 100 percent.

Pinsky is a skeptic of nuclear energy, saying that living through scares like Chernobyl and Three Mile Island has made him unsure of its safety.

=== Healthcare ===
During his 1998 state senate campaign, Pinsky ran on providing universal healthcare coverage to all Marylanders. In 2018, he was the leading sponsor on the Senate version of the Healthy Maryland Act, which would institute Medicare-for-all, single-payer healthcare legislation in Maryland.

In 1999, Pinsky voted against a bill that would ban assisted suicide in Maryland.

=== Gambling ===
In 1987, Pinsky voted against legislation that would return slot machines to eight counties on the Eastern Shore of Maryland under the pretext that they were only used by nonprofit organizations for charitable purposes. In 2003, Pinsky opposed a bill that would legalize slot machines in Maryland and earmark almost half of the revenue for public education, arguing that the track owners' share of the profit was far too generous. In 2012, Pinsky opposed legislation that allow a new casino in Prince George's County and add Las Vegas-style table games at Maryland's five other slots venues, saying that he thinks the county should focus its economic development efforts elsewhere.

=== Guns ===
In 2013, Pinsky voted in favor of a gun control bill that would require fingerprinting of gun buyers, implement new limits on firearm purchases by the mentally ill, and mandate bans on assault weapons and on magazines that hold more than 10 bullets.

=== Minimum wage ===
Pinsky introduced legislation in the 1997 legislative session that would have raised the Maryland minimum wage from $5.15 to $7.70 over two years. The bill was killed in the Senate Finance Committee, receiving a 8-3 unfavorable vote. In 2014, Pinsky proposed continuing to increase the state's minimum wage beyond $10.10 per hour and increasing the base wage for tipped workers.

=== Social issues ===
In 1996, Pinsky and state senator Chris Van Hollen nearly derailed a plan by Senate President Thomas V. "Mike" Miller to build two new football stadiums in Baltimore and Landover by introducing legislation that would prohibit public funds from going towards the construction of the stadiums.

In 2012, Pinsky voted in favor of legalizing same-sex marriage in Maryland.

In 2013, Pinsky voted in favor of repealing the death penalty in Maryland.

=== Taxes ===
Pinsky introduced legislation in the 1996 legislative session that would have taxed corporate executives' incomes at a rate more than 20 times greater than the tax on the salaries of the companies' lowest- paid employees.

In 2012, Pinsky defended legislation that would significantly raise taxes on Marylanders earning half a million dollars or more.

In 2013, Pinsky voted in favor of legislation that raises taxes on gas to replenish the state's transportation fund.

== Personal life ==
Pinsky was married to Joan Rothgeb, who died from pancreatic cancer on March 12, 2020. He and his wife had two daughters. He lives in University Park, Maryland, and is Jewish.

In January 2025, Pinsky revealed to Maryland Energy Administration staffers that he had been receiving chemotherapy and immunotherapy to treat bladder cancer for the past several months. In an interview with Maryland Matters, Pinsky said that he was given a positive long-term prognosis and was feeling well generally, and wanted to disclose his illness before the start of the legislative session on January 8 to avoid speculation about his health since he had begun wearing hats in public.

== Electoral history ==
Maryland House of Delegates District 22 Democratic Primary Election, 1986
Party	Candidate	Votes	%
Democratic	Richard A. Palumbo	5,730	24%
Democratic	Paul Pinsky	3,839	16%
Democratic	Anne MacKinnon	3,310	14%
Democratic	David Bird	3,248	14%
Democratic	Andrew C. Hanko	3,088	13%
Democratic	Bryan K. Swartwood	2,049	9%
Democratic	Francis H. George	1,261	5%
Democratic	Marion Marie Hoffman	1,251	5%

Maryland House of Delegates District 22 General Election, 1986
Party	Candidate	Votes	%
Democratic	Richard A. Palumbo	11,498	32%
Democratic	Anne MacKinnon	10,286	28%
Democratic	Paul Pinsky	10,262	28%
Republican	James J. Krehely	4,158	11%

Maryland House of Delegates District 22 Democratic Primary Election, 1990
Party	Candidate	Votes	%
Democratic	Richard A. Palumbo	6,501	31%
Democratic	Paul Pinsky	5,232	25%
Democratic	Anne Healey	3,874	18%
Democratic	M. Teresa O'Hare Johnson	3,366	16%
Democratic	C. Hope Brown	2,050	10%

Maryland House of Delegates District 22 General Election, 1990
Party	Candidate	Votes	%
Democratic	Richard A. Palumbo	10,353	27%
Democratic	Paul Pinsky	9,566	25%
Democratic	Anne Healey	9,355	24%
Republican	Mary E. Rand	3,164	8%
Republican	Gerard F. Kiernan	3,118	8%

Maryland Senate District 22 Democratic Primary Election, 1994
Party	Candidate	Votes	%
Democratic	Paul G. Pinsky	6,229	74%
Democratic	Charles J. Kenny Jr.	2,202	26%

Maryland Senate District 22 General Election, 1994
Party	Candidate	Votes	%
Democratic	Paul G. Pinsky	11,713	63%
Republican	John A. Schaffer	6,849	37%

Maryland Senate District 22 Democratic Primary Election, 1998
Party	Candidate	Votes	%
Democratic	Paul G. Pinsky	5,092	100%

Maryland Senate District 22 General Election, 1998
Party	Candidate	Votes	%
Democratic	Paul G. Pinsky	16,582	100%

Maryland Senate District 22 Democratic Primary Election, 2002
Party	Candidate	Votes	%
Democratic	Paul G. Pinsky	8,240	76.0%
Democratic	Richard R. Pilski	2,598	24.0%

Maryland Senate District 22 General Election, 2002
Party	Candidate	Votes	%
Democratic	Paul G. Pinsky	19,930	99.16%
Other Write-Ins	Other Write-Ins	169	0.84%

Maryland Senate District 22 Democratic Primary Election, 2006
Party	Candidate	Votes	%
Democratic	Paul G. Pinsky	9,192	100%

Maryland Senate District 22 General Election, 2006
Party	Candidate	Votes	%
Democratic	Paul G. Pinsky	20,397	99.2%
Other Write-Ins	Other Write-Ins	156	0.8%

Maryland Senate District 22 Democratic Primary Election, 2010
Party	Candidate	Votes	%
Democratic	Paul G. Pinsky	7,636	100%

Maryland Senate District 22 General Election, 2010
Party	Candidate	Votes	%
Democratic	Paul G. Pinsky	20,731	99.4%
Other Write-Ins	Other Write-Ins	122	0.6%

Maryland Senate District 22 Democratic Primary Election, 2014
Party	Candidate	Votes	%
Democratic	Paul G. Pinsky	8,690	100%

Maryland Senate District 22 General Election, 2014
Party	Candidate	Votes	%
Democratic	Paul G. Pinsky	21,471	86.7%
Republican	Janice Denise Fountaine	3,245	13.1%
Other Write-Ins	Other Write-Ins	35	0.1%

Maryland Senate District 22 Democratic Primary Election, 2018
Party	Candidate	Votes	%
Democratic	Paul G. Pinsky	12,394	100%

Maryland Senate District 22 Democratic General Election, 2018
Party	Candidate	Votes	%
Democratic	Paul G. Pinsky	12,394	92.4%
Libertarian	Lauren K. Drew	2,633	7.2%
Other Write-Ins	Other Write-Ins	136	0.4%
