= Tawanna P. Gaines =

American politician (1952–2022)

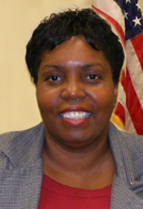

Member of the Maryland House of Delegates from the 22nd district
- In office December 21, 2001 – October 4, 2019
- Preceded by: Richard Palumbo (D)
- Succeeded by: Nicole A. Williams (D)
- Constituency: Prince George's County

Mayor, Town of Berwyn Heights
- In office 2000–2001
- Preceded by: William T. Armistead Jr.
- Succeeded by: Ronald M. Shane

Council member, Town of Berwyn Heights
- In office 1998–2000

Personal details
- Born: February 1, 1952 Washington, D.C., U.S.
- Died: November 12, 2022 (aged 70) Lanham, Maryland, U.S.
- Party: Democratic
- Children: 2
- Education: District of Columbia Teachers College, 1970-72; Towson University, Realtors Institute of Maryland, Associate Broker, 1981
- Occupation: Politician, University staff

Tawanna Phyllis Gaines (February 1, 1952 – November 12, 2022) was an American politician who represented District 22 in the Maryland House of Delegates from December 2001 to October 2019. She resigned in the face of federal corruption charges and in 2020 was sentenced to six months in prison.

== Background ==
Gaines was born in Washington, DC, on February 1, 1952. She attended District of Columbia Teachers College, 1970-72.

== In the legislature ==
Gaines had been a member of House of Delegates since December 21, 2001 when she was appointed by Governor Parris Glendening to fill the vacancy of Richard Palumbo who himself had been appointed judge to the District Court of Maryland for Prince George's County. She was appointed by the Speaker to be Deputy Majority Whip in 2003. She served on the House Appropriations Committee and was the Chairwoman of the Appropriations Sub Committee on Transportation and the Environment, in addition to the capital budget subcommittees. She was also a member of the Legislative Black Caucus of Maryland.

Gaines resigned from the legislature on October 4, 2019 and on October 7 was charged with federal wire fraud for using over $22,000 of campaign money for personal use. Her daughter and campaign treasurer subsequently pled guilty in November 2019 to wire fraud, admitting using campaign funds for personal use. On January 3, 2020, Gaines was sentenced to six months in prison for one count of wire fraud.

=== Legislative notes ===
- voted for the Clean Indoor Air Act of 2007 (HB359)
- voted against slots in 2005 (HB1361)
- voted for the Tax Reform Act of 2007 (HB2)

== Death ==
Gaines died from bladder cancer on November 12, 2022, at the age of 70.
