= Maryland Legislative District 22 =

American legislative district

Maryland's legislative district 22
- Represents part of Prince George's County
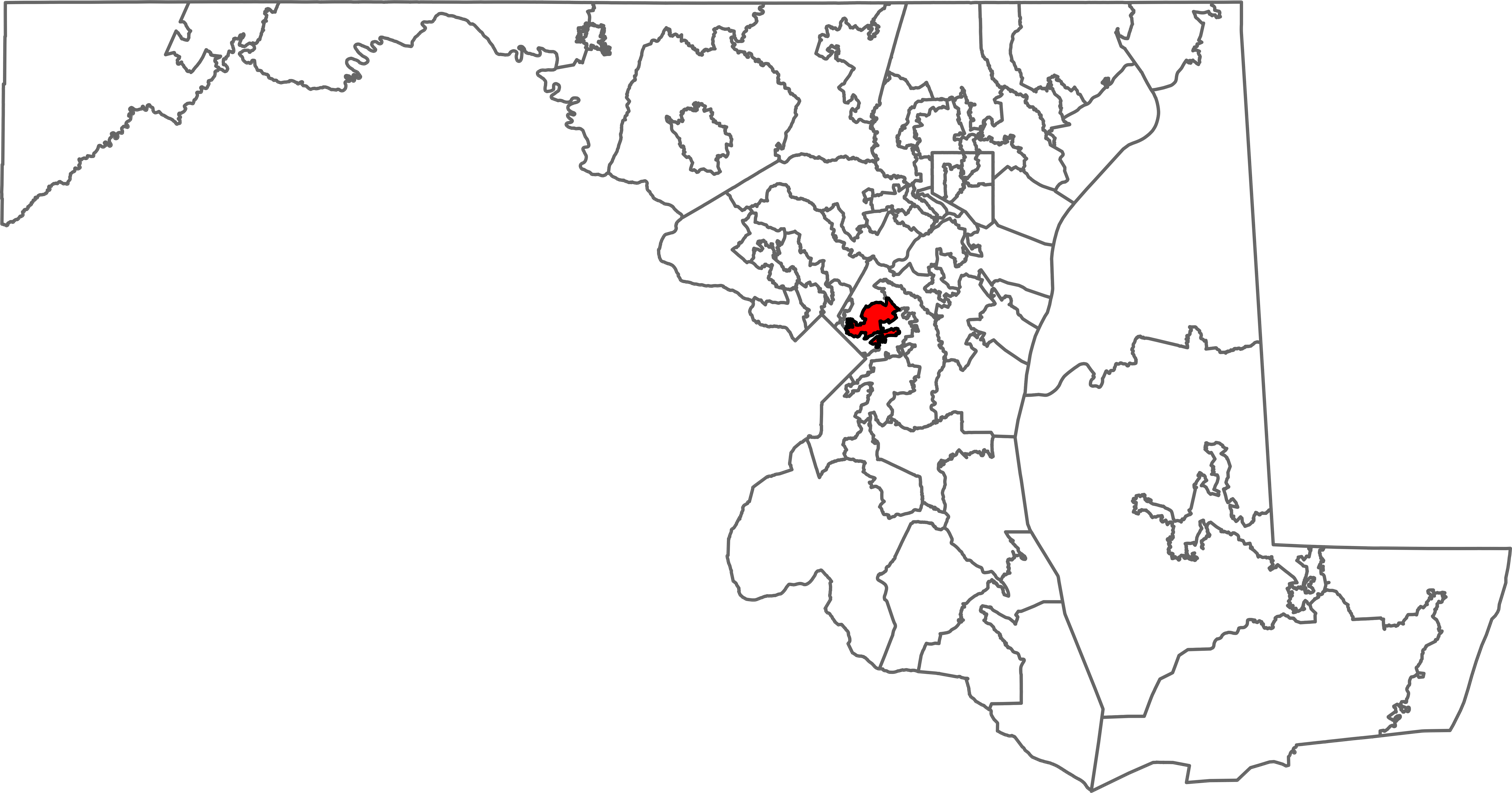
- Senator: Alonzo T. Washington (D)
- Delegate(s): Anne Healey (D); Nicole A. Williams (D); Ashanti Martinez (D)
- Registration: 75.6% Democratic; 6.8% Republican; 15.1% unaffiliated
- Demographics: 15.4% White; 45.5% Black/African American; 1.4% Native American; 6.0% Asian; 0.0% Hawaiian/Pacific Islander; 22.7% Other race; 9.0% Two or more races; 32.2% Hispanic
- Population (2020): 144,235
- Voting-age population: 108,328
- Registered voters: 75,652

Maryland Legislative District 22 is one of 47 districts in the state for the Maryland General Assembly. It covers part of Prince George's County. The district is represented by three delegates in the Maryland House of Delegates.

== Demographic characteristics ==
As of the 2020 United States census, the district had a population of 144,235, of whom 108,328 (75.1%) were of voting age. The racial makeup of the district was 22,273 (15.4%) White, 65,577 (45.5%) African American, 2,014 (1.4%) Native American, 8,615 (6.0%) Asian, 16 (0.0%) Pacific Islander, 32,693 (22.7%) from some other race, and 12,978 (9.0%) from two or more races. Hispanic or Latino of any race were 46,420 (32.2%) of the population.

The district had 75,652 registered voters as of October 17, 2020, of whom 11,434 (15.1%) were registered as unaffiliated, 5,125 (6.8%) were registered as Republicans, 57,189 (75.6%) were registered as Democrats, and 1,544 (2.0%) were registered to other parties.

== Political representation ==
The district is represented for the 2023–2027 legislative term in the State Senate by Alonzo T. Washington (D) and in the House of Delegates by Anne Healey (D), Nicole A. Williams (D) and Ashanti Martinez (D).

== Election history ==
Years	Senator	Party	Electoral history
January 8, 1975 – December 31, 1977	Meyer M. Emanuel Jr.	Democratic	Redistricted from District 4-B and re-elected in 1974. Resigned.
January 1978 – June 19, 1982	John J. Garrity	Democratic	Appointed to serve the remainder of Emanuel's term. Elected in 1978. Resigned.
August 1982 – January 12, 1983	Richard A. Palumbo	Democratic	Appointed to serve the remainder of Garrity's term.
January 12, 1983 – December 31, 1977	Thomas P. O'Reilly	Democratic	Elected in 1982. Re-elected in 1986. Re-elected in 1990. Resigned.
August 2, 1994 – January 18, 2023	Paul G. Pinsky	Democratic	Appointed to serve the remainder of O'Reilly's term. Elected in 1994. Re-elected in 1998. Re-elected in 2002. Re-elected in 2006. Re-elected in 2010. Re-elected in 2014. Re-elected in 2018. Re-elected in 2022. Resigned.
January 30, 2023 – present	Alonzo T. Washington	Democratic	Appointed to serve the remainder of Pinsky's term. Elected in 2026.
