= 2018 Maryland Senate election =

- November 6, 2018

All 47 seats in the Maryland Senate 24 seats needed for a majority
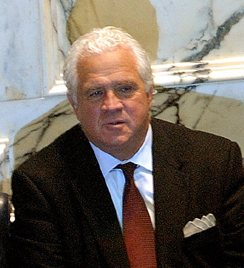

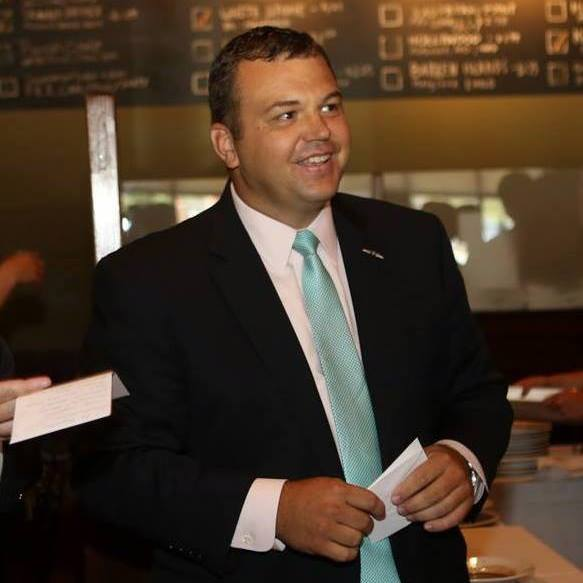
	Majority party	Minority party
Leader	Mike Miller	J.B. Jennings
Party	Democratic	Republican
Leader since	January 21, 1987	November 12, 2014
Leader's seat	27th District	7th District
Last election	33 seats	14 seats
Seats before	33	14
Seats won	32	15
Seat change	▼1	▲1
Popular vote	1,446,326	742,827
Percentage	64.9%	33.3%
Swing	▲6.12%	▼7.51%
- Democratic gain Democratic hold Republican gain Republican hold Democratic: 50–60% 60-70% 70–80% 80–90% >90% Republican: 50–60% 60–70% 70–80% >90%
President before election
Mike Miller
Democratic
Elected President
Mike Miller
Democratic

Elections for the Maryland Senate were held on November 6, 2018, with all 47 seats being contested. Republicans had initially hoped to break the Democrats' supermajority in the upper chamber by knocking off five incumbents, known as their "Drive for Five" plan. Though they did make a net gain of one seat, they came short of their goal. Three seats switched hands: District 9 in Carroll and Howard counties flipped from Republican to Democratic while District 38 in Somerset, Wicomico, and Worcester counties and District 42 in Baltimore County both flipped from Democrats to Republicans.

The Maryland Senate had been in Democratic hands since the elections of 1900. Despite Governor Larry Hogan's success in his gubernatorial race at the top of the ticket, nobody expected Republicans to come close to recapturing the majority. In terms of popular vote, Maryland's Republican Senate candidates performed significantly worse than they previously had in 2014.

== Summary ==
=== Closest races ===
Seats where the margin of victory was under 10%:

1. State Senate district 34, 0.39%
2. State Senate district 9, 1.74% (gain)
3. State Senate district 42, 2.02% (gain)
4. State Senate district 8, 2.23%
5. State Senate district 38, 5.39% (gain)
6. State Senate district 33, 7.03%
7. State Senate district 30, 9.23%

== Retiring incumbents ==
=== Democrats ===
1. District 12: Edward J. Kasemeyer retired.
2. District 18: Richard Madaleno retired to run for governor.
3. District 19: Roger Manno retired to run for Congress in Maryland's 6th congressional district.
4. District 25: Ulysses Currie retired.
5. District 26: C. Anthony Muse retired to run for Prince George's County Executive.
6. District 30: John Astle retired to run for mayor of Annapolis in 2017.
7. District 31: James E. DeGrange Sr. retired.
8. District 42: James Brochin retired to run for Baltimore County Executive.
9. District 47: Victor R. Ramirez retired to run for Prince George's County State's Attorney.

=== Republicans ===
1. District 35: Linda Norman retired.

== Incumbents defeated ==
=== In primary elections ===
==== Democrats ====
1. District 28: Thomas M. Middleton lost renomination to Arthur Ellis.
2. District 40: Barbara A. Robinson lost renomination to Antonio Hayes.
3. District 43: Joan Carter Conway lost renomination to Mary L. Washington.
4. District 45: Nathaniel J. McFadden lost renomination to Cory McCray.

==== Republicans ====
1. District 29: Stephen Waugh lost renomination to Jack Bailey.

=== In the general elections ===
==== Democrats ====
1. District 38: James N. Mathias Jr. lost to Mary Beth Carozza.

==== Republicans ====
1. District 9: Gail H. Bates lost to Katie Fry Hester.

== Predictions ==
Source	Ranking	As of
Governing	Safe D	October 8, 2018

== Detailed results ==
All election results are from the Maryland Board of Elections.

=== District 1 ===
2018 Maryland's 1st Senate district election
Party	Candidate	Votes	%
Republican	George C. Edwards (incumbent)	34,966	98.3%
Write-in		593	1.7%
Total votes		35,559	100%
Republican hold			

=== District 2 ===
Results by precinct Serafini: 50–60%; 60–70%; 70–80%; 80–90%; Roland: 50–60%; 60–70%

2018 Maryland's 2nd Senate district election
Party	Candidate	Votes	%
Republican	Andrew A. Serafini (incumbent)	29,798	71.7%
Green	Jenna L. Roland	11,631	28.0%
Write-in		158	0.4%
Total votes		41,587	100%
Republican hold			

=== District 3 ===
Results by precinct Young: 50–60%; 60–70%; 70–80%; Giangrande: 50–60%; 60–70%; 70–80%

2018 Maryland's 3rd Senate district election
Party	Candidate	Votes	%
Democratic	Ronald N. Young (incumbent)	30,391	58.5%
Republican	Craig Giangrande	21,471	41.3%
Write-in		114	0.2%
Total votes		51,976	100%
Democratic hold			

=== District 4 ===
Results by precinct Hough: 50–60%; 60–70%; 70–80%; Douglass: 50–60%; Tie

2018 Maryland's 4th Senate district election
Party	Candidate	Votes	%
Republican	Michael Hough (incumbent)	35,240	59.1%
Democratic	Jessica Douglass	24,358	40.8%
Write-in		47	0.1%
Total votes		59,645	100%
Republican hold			

=== District 5 ===
Results by precinct Ready: 50–60%; 60–70%; 70–80%

2018 Maryland's 5th Senate district election
Party	Candidate	Votes	%
Republican	Justin Ready (incumbent)	39,568	71.5%
Democratic	Jamie O'Marr	15,739	28.4%
Write-in		63	0.1%
Total votes		55,370	100%
Republican hold			

=== District 6 ===
Results by precinct Salling: 40–50%; 50–60%; 60–70%; 70–80%; Staigerwald: 60–70%; 70–80%; 80–90%; >90%

2018 Maryland's 6th Senate district election
Party	Candidate	Votes	%
Republican	Johnny Ray Salling (incumbent)	19,511	55.3%
Democratic	Buddy Staigerwald	14,108	40.0%
Independent	Scott M. Collier	1,631	4.6%
Write-in		23	0.1%
Total votes		35,273	100%
Republican hold			

=== District 7 ===
Results by precinct Jennings: 50–60%; 60–70%; 70–80%; 80–90%; Hines: 50–60%

2018 Maryland's 7th Senate district election
Party	Candidate	Votes	%
Republican	J. B. Jennings (incumbent)	40,070	66.9%
Democratic	Donna Hines	19,780	33.0%
Write-in		69	0.1%
Total votes		59,919	100%
Republican hold			

=== District 8 ===
Results by precinct Klausmeier: 50–60%; 60–70%; 70–80%; 80–90%; >90%; Miele: 50–60%; 60–70%; 70–80%

2018 Maryland's 8th Senate district election
Party	Candidate	Votes	%
Democratic	Kathy Klausmeier (incumbent)	24,332	51.1%
Republican	Christian Miele	23,271	48.8%
Write-in		45	0.1%
Total votes		47,648	100%
Democratic hold			

=== District 9 ===
Results by precinct Hester: 50–60%; 60–70%; 70–80%; Bates: 50–60%; 60–70%; 70–80%

2018 Maryland's 9th Senate district election
Party	Candidate	Votes	%
Democratic	Katie Fry Hester	33,493	50.8%
Republican	Gail H. Bates (incumbent)	32,347	49.1%
Write-in		52	0.1%
Total votes		65,892	100%
Democratic gain from Republican			

=== District 10 ===
Results by precinct Kelley: 50–60%; 60–70%; 70–80%; 80–90%; >90%; Boston: 50–60%; 60–70%; 70–80%

2018 Maryland's 10th Senate district election
Party	Candidate	Votes	%
Democratic	Delores G. Kelley (incumbent)	38,005	80.3%
Republican	Stephanie Boston	9,229	19.5%
Write-in		74	0.2%
Total votes		47,308	100%
Democratic hold			

=== District 11 ===
2018 Maryland's 11th Senate district election
Party	Candidate	Votes	%
Democratic	Robert Zirkin (incumbent)	40,472	96.9%
Write-in		1,299	3.1%
Total votes		41,771	100%
Democratic hold			

=== District 12 ===
Results by precinct Lam: 50–60%; 60–70%; 70–80%; 80–90%; Hooe: 50–60%; 60–70%; 70–80%

2018 Maryland's 12th Senate district election
Party	Candidate	Votes	%
Democratic	Clarence Lam	32,730	66.1%
Republican	Joseph D. "Joe" Hooe	16,747	33.8%
Write-in		46	0.1%
Total votes		49,523	100%
Democratic hold			

=== District 13 ===
2018 Maryland's 13th Senate district election
Party	Candidate	Votes	%
Democratic	Guy Guzzone (incumbent)	47,309	97.4%
Write-in		1,267	2.6%
Total votes		48,576	100%
Democratic hold			

=== District 14 ===
Results by precinct Zucker: 50–60%; 60–70%; 70–80%; 80–90%; >90%; Drozd: 50–60%

2018 Maryland's 14th Senate district election
Party	Candidate	Votes	%
Democratic	Craig Zucker (incumbent)	40,262	72.6%
Republican	Robert Drozd	15,177	27.1%
Write-in		52	0.1%
Total votes		55,491	100%
Democratic hold			

=== District 15 ===
Results by precinct Feldman: 50–60%; 60–70%; 70–80%; 80–90%; Wilson: 50–60%; Tie

2018 Maryland's 15th Senate district election
Party	Candidate	Votes	%
Democratic	Brian Feldman (incumbent)	38,771	72.0%
Republican	David Wilson	15,000	27.9%
Write-in		46	0.1%
Total votes		53,817	100%
Democratic hold			

=== District 16 ===
Results by precinct Lee: 50–60%; 60–70%; 70–80%; 80–90%

2018 Maryland's 16th Senate district election
Party	Candidate	Votes	%
Democratic	Susan C. Lee (incumbent)	48,822	80.1%
Republican	Marcus Alzona	12,052	19.8%
Write-in		61	0.1%
Total votes		60,935	100%
Democratic hold			

=== District 17 ===
Results by precinct Kagan: 70–80%; 80–90%; >90%; Tie

2018 Maryland's 17th Senate district election
Party	Candidate	Votes	%
Democratic	Cheryl Kagan (incumbent)	36,147	79.0%
Republican	Josephine J. Wang	9,529	20.8%
Write-in		62	0.1%
Total votes		45,738	100%
Democratic hold			

=== District 18 ===
2018 Maryland's 18th Senate district election
Party	Candidate	Votes	%
Democratic	Jeff Waldstreicher	41,360	97.6%
Write-in		1,009	2.4%
Total votes		42,369	100%
Democratic hold			

=== District 19 ===
Results by precinct Kramer: 70–80%; 80–90%; >90%; Tie

2018 Maryland's 19th Senate district election
Party	Candidate	Votes	%
Democratic	Benjamin F. Kramer	39,393	88.0%
Green	David Jeang	4,795	10.7%
Write-in		574	1.3%
Total votes		44,762	100%
Democratic hold			

=== District 20 ===
Results by precinct Smith: 70–80%; 80–90%; >90%

2018 Maryland's 20th Senate district election
Party	Candidate	Votes	%
Democratic	William C. Smith Jr. (incumbent)	42,069	90.8%
Republican	Dwight Patel	4,236	9.1%
Write-in		35	0.1%
Independent	Vardly E. "North" St. Preux (write-in)	5	0.0%
Total votes		46,345	100%
Democratic hold			

=== District 21 ===
Results by precinct Rosapepe: 50–60%; 60–70%; 70–80%; 80–90%; >90%; Havis: 50–60%; Tie

2018 Maryland's 21st Senate district election
Party	Candidate	Votes	%
Democratic	James Rosapepe (incumbent)	32,262	77.5%
Republican	Lee Havis	9,311	22.4%
Write-in		59	0.1%
Total votes		41,632	100%
Democratic hold			

=== District 22 ===
Results by precinct Pinsky: 80–90%; >90%; Tie

2018 Maryland's 22nd Senate district election
Party	Candidate	Votes	%
Democratic	Paul G. Pinsky (incumbent)	33,849	92.4%
Libertarian	Lauren K. Drew	2,633	7.2%
Write-in		136	0.4%
Total votes		36,618	100%
Democratic hold			

=== District 23 ===
2018 Maryland's 23rd Senate district election
Party	Candidate	Votes	%
Democratic	Douglas J. J. Peters (incumbent)	53,176	98.6%
Write-in		769	1.4%
Total votes		53,495	100%
Democratic hold			

=== District 24 ===
2018 Maryland's 24th Senate district election
Party	Candidate	Votes	%
Democratic	Joanne C. Benson (incumbent)	44,568	99.2%
Write-in		338	0.8%
Total votes		44,906	100%
Democratic hold			

=== District 25 ===
2018 Maryland's 25th Senate district election
Party	Candidate	Votes	%
Democratic	Melony G. Griffith	44,390	99.4%
Write-in		253	0.6%
Total votes		44,643	100%
Democratic hold			

=== District 26 ===
Results by precinct Patterson: 70–80%; 80–90%; >90%; Tie

2018 Maryland's 26th Senate district election
Party	Candidate	Votes	%
Democratic	Obie Patterson	42,929	92.5%
Republican	Ike Puzon	3,280	7.1%
Write-in		183	0.4%
Total votes		46,392	100%
Democratic hold			

=== District 27 ===
Results by precinct Miller: 50–60%; 60–70%; 80–90%; >90%; Peed: 50–60%; 60–70%

2018 Maryland's 27th Senate district election
Party	Candidate	Votes	%
Democratic	Thomas V. Miller Jr. (incumbent)	39,664	66.0%
Republican	Jesse Allen Peed	20,359	33.9%
Write-in		111	0.2%
Total votes		60,134	100%
Democratic hold			

=== District 28 ===
Results by precinct Ellis: 50–60%; 60–70%; 70–80%; 80–90%; >90%; Dotson: 50–60%; 60–70%; 70–80%; 80–90%

2018 Maryland's 28th Senate district election
Party	Candidate	Votes	%
Democratic	Arthur Ellis	37,585	66.2%
Republican	Bill Dotson	19,063	33.6%
Write-in		145	0.3%
Total votes		56,793	100%
Democratic hold			

=== District 29 ===
Results by precinct Bailey: 50–60%; 60–70%; 70–80%; Brewer: 50–60%; 60–70%; Tie

2018 Maryland's 29th Senate district election
Party	Candidate	Votes	%
Republican	Jack Bailey	28,918	60.2%
Democratic	Thomas Brewer	19,017	39.6%
Write-in		96	0.2%
Total votes		48,031	100%
Republican hold			

=== District 30 ===
Results by precinct Elfreth: 40–50%; 50–60%; 60–70%; 70–80%; 80–90%; George: 40–50%; 50–60%; 60–70%; Tie

2018 Maryland's 30th Senate district election
Party	Candidate	Votes	%
Democratic	Sarah Elfreth	29,736	53.8%
Republican	Ron George	24,639	44.6%
Libertarian	Christopher Wallace, Sr.	826	1.5%
Write-in		38	0.1%
Total votes		55,239	100%
Democratic hold			

=== District 31 ===
Results by precinct Simonaire: 50–60%; 60–70%; 70–80%; 80–90%; Democrats: 50–60%; 60–70%; 70–80%

2018 Maryland's 31st Senate district election
Party	Candidate	Votes	%
Republican	Bryan Simonaire (incumbent)	29,489	61.0%
Democratic	Scott Harman	18,778	38.9%
Write-in		61	0.1%
Total votes		48,328	100%
Republican hold			

=== District 32 ===
Results by precinct Beidle: 50–60%; 60–70%; 70–80%; 80–90%; >90%; Grasso: 50–60%; 60–70%; Tie

2018 Maryland's 32nd Senate district election
Party	Candidate	Votes	%
Democratic	Pamela Beidle	30,384	66.4%
Republican	John Grasso	15,306	33.4%
Write-in		70	0.2%
Total votes		45,760	100%
Democratic hold			

=== District 33 ===
Results by precinct Reilly: 50–60%; 60–70%; 70–80%; Hurwitz: 50–60%; 60–70%

2018 Maryland's 33rd Senate district election
Party	Candidate	Votes	%
Republican	Edward R. Reilly (incumbent)	34,884	53.5%
Democratic	Eve Hurwitz	30,298	46.4%
Write-in		51	0.1%
Total votes		65,233	100%
Republican hold			

=== District 34 ===
Results by precinct Cassilly: 50–60%; 60–70%; 70–80%; 80–90%; James: 50–60%; 60–70%; 70–80%; Tie

2018 Maryland's 34th Senate district election
Party	Candidate	Votes	%
Republican	Robert Cassilly (incumbent)	24,445	50.1%
Democratic	Mary-Dulany James	24,256	49.7%
Write-in		87	0.2%
Total votes		48,788	100%
Republican hold			

=== District 35 ===
Results by precinct Gallion: 40–50%; 50–60%; 60–70%; 70–80%; 80–90%; Tie

2018 Maryland's 35th Senate district election
Party	Candidate	Votes	%
Republican	Jason C. Gallion	33,813	67.3%
Independent	Frank Esposito	10,600	21.1%
Libertarian	Christopher Randers-Pehrson	5,632	11.2%
Write-in		222	0.4%
Total votes		50,267	100%
Republican hold			

=== District 36 ===
Results by precinct Hershey: 40–50%; 50–60%; 60–70%; 70–80%; 80–90%; Sinclair: 50–60%

2018 Maryland's 36th Senate district election
Party	Candidate	Votes	%
Republican	Steve Hershey (incumbent)	33,028	65.1%
Democratic	Heather Lynette Sinclair	17,691	34.9%
Write-in		32	0.1%
Total votes		50,751	100%
Republican hold			

=== District 37 ===
Results by precinct Eckardt: 40–50%; 50–60%; 60–70%; 70–80%; 80–90%; >90%; Wright: 50–60%; 60–70%; 70–80%; 80–90%; >90%

2018 Maryland's 37th Senate district election
Party	Candidate	Votes	%
Republican	Adelaide C. Eckardt (incumbent)	29,520	59.9%
Democratic	Holly Wright	19,691	40.0%
Write-in		56	0.1%
Total votes		49,267	100%
Republican hold			

=== District 38 ===
Results by precinct Carozza: 50–60%; 60–70%; 70–80%; Mathias: 50–60%; 60–70%; 70–80%; 80–90%; >90%

2018 Maryland's 38th Senate district election
Party	Candidate	Votes	%
Republican	Mary Beth Carozza	25,731	52.6%
Democratic	James N. Mathias Jr. (incumbent)	23,098	47.3%
Write-in		44	0.1%
Total votes		48,873	100%
Republican gain from Democratic			

=== District 39 ===
Results by precinct King: 60–70%; 70–80%; 80–90%

2018 Maryland's 39th Senate district election
Party	Candidate	Votes	%
Democratic	Nancy J. King (incumbent)	32,417	79.3%
Republican	Al Phillips	8,434	20.6%
Write-in		53	0.1%
Total votes		40,904	100%
Democratic hold			

=== District 40 ===
2018 Maryland's 40th Senate district election
Party	Candidate	Votes	%
Democratic	Antonio Hayes	26,960	98.7%
Write-in		349	1.3%
Total votes		27,309	100%
Democratic hold			

=== District 41 ===
2018 Maryland's 41st Senate district election
Party	Candidate	Votes	%
Democratic	Jill P. Carter (incumbent)	33,284	98.2%
Write-in		616	1.8%
Total votes		33,900	100%
Democratic hold			

=== District 42 ===
Results by precinct West: 50–60%; 60–70%; 70–80%; >90%; Leonard: 50–60%; 60–70%; 70–80%; >90%; Tie

2018 Maryland's 42nd Senate district election
Party	Candidate	Votes	%
Republican	Chris West	29,100	51.0%
Democratic	Robbie Leonard	27,949	49.0%
Write-in		46	0.1%
Total votes		57,095	100%
Republican gain from Democratic			

=== District 43 ===
2018 Maryland's 43rd Senate district election
Party	Candidate	Votes	%
Democratic	Mary L. Washington	35,972	98.8%
Write-in		423	1.2%
Total votes		36,395	100%
Democratic hold			

=== District 44 ===
Results by precinct Nathan-Pulliam: 50–60%; 60–70%; 70–80%; 80–90%; >90%

2018 Maryland's 44th Senate district election
Party	Candidate	Votes	%
Democratic	Shirley Nathan-Pulliam (incumbent)	34,834	84.5%
Republican	Victor Clark, Jr.	6,280	15.2%
Write-in		86	0.2%
Total votes		41,200	100%
Democratic hold			

=== District 45 ===
2018 Maryland's 45th Senate district election
Party	Candidate	Votes	%
Democratic	Cory V. McCray	29,608	98.8%
Write-in		373	1.2%
Total votes		29,981	100%
Democratic hold			

=== District 46 ===
Results by precinct Ferguson: 50–60%; 60–70%; 70–80%; 80–90%; >90%; Tie

2018 Maryland's 46th Senate district election
Party	Candidate	Votes	%
Democratic	Bill Ferguson (incumbent)	26,203	78.2%
Republican	Christine Digman	7,238	21.6%
Write-in		60	0.2%
Total votes		33,501	100%
Democratic hold			

=== District 47 ===
Results by precinct Augustine: 70–80%; 80–90%; >90%; Tie

2018 Maryland's 47th Senate district election
Party	Candidate	Votes	%
Democratic	Malcolm Augustine	23,983	93.0%
Republican	Fred Price Jr.	1,777	6.9%
Write-in		33	0.1%
Total votes		25,793	100%
Democratic hold			
