= Maryland Legislative District 29 =

American legislative district

Maryland's legislative district 29
- Represents parts of Calvert County and St. Mary's County
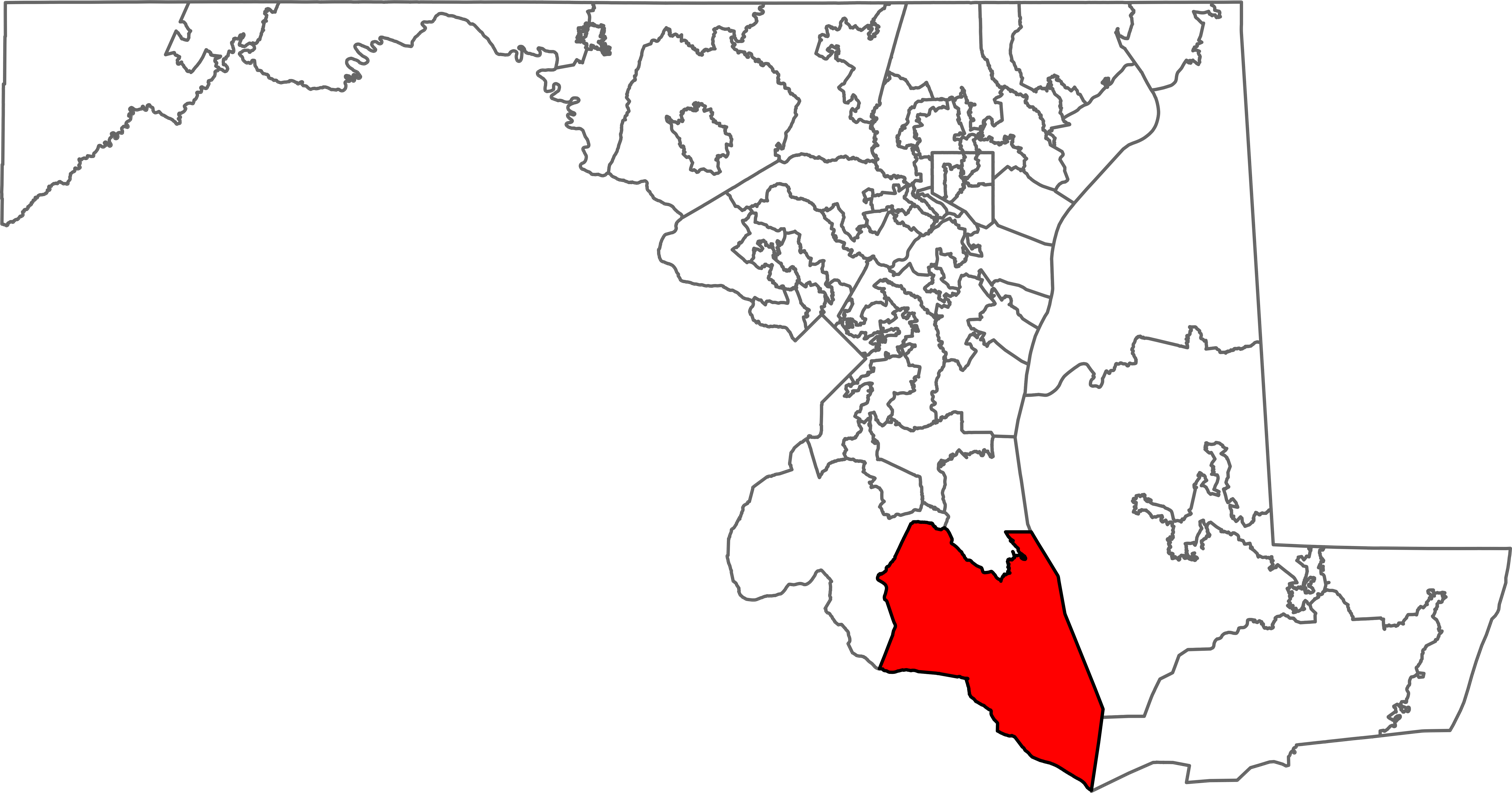
- Senator: Jack Bailey (R)
- Delegate(s): Matt Morgan (R) (District 29A); Brian M. Crosby (D) (District 29B); Todd Morgan (R) (District 29C)
- Registration: 41.1% Republican; 36.1% Democratic; 21.3% unaffiliated
- Demographics: 72.2% White; 14.5% Black/African American; 0.4% Native American; 2.7% Asian; 0.1% Hawaiian/Pacific Islander; 1.9% Other race; 8.2% Two or more races; 5.6% Hispanic
- Population (2020): 135,519
- Voting-age population: 103,220
- Registered voters: 89,345

Maryland Legislative District 29 is one of 47 districts in the state for the Maryland General Assembly. It covers parts of Calvert County and St. Mary's County. The district is divided into three sub-districts for the Maryland House of Delegates: District 29A, District 29B and District 29C.

== Demographic characteristics ==
As of the 2020 United States census, the district had a population of 135,519, of whom 103,220 (76.2%) were of voting age. The racial makeup of the district was 97,907 (72.2%) White, 19,595 (14.5%) African American, 517 (0.4%) Native American, 3,690 (2.7%) Asian, 117 (0.1%) Pacific Islander, 2,568 (1.9%) from some other race, and 11,146 (8.2%) from two or more races. Hispanic or Latino of any race were 7,556 (5.6%) of the population.

The district had 89,345 registered voters as of October 17, 2020, of whom 18,988 (21.3%) were registered as unaffiliated, 36,733 (41.1%) were registered as Republicans, 32,210 (36.1%) were registered as Democrats, and 738 (0.8%) were registered to other parties.

== Political representation ==
The district is represented for the 2023–2027 legislative term in the State Senate by Jack Bailey (R) and in the House of Delegates by Matt Morgan (R, District 29A), Brian M. Crosby (D, District 29B) and Todd Morgan (R, District 29C).

== Election history ==
Years	Senator	Party	Electoral history
January 8, 1975 – January 12, 1983	James C. Simpson	Democratic	Elected in 1974. Re-elected in 1978. Redistricted to the 28th district.
January 12, 1983 – January 11, 1995	Bernie Fowler	Democratic	Elected in 1982. Re-elected in 1986. Re-elected in 1990. Retired to run for lieutenant governor.
January 11, 1995 – January 14, 2015	Roy Dyson	Democratic	Elected in 1994. Re-elected in 1998. Re-elected in 2002. Re-elected in 2006. Re-elected in 2010. Lost re-election.
January 14, 2015 – January 9, 2019	Stephen Waugh	Republican	Elected in 2014. Lost renomination.
January 9, 2019 – present	Jack Bailey	Republican	Elected in 2018. Re-elected in 2022. Re-elected in 2026.
