= 2014 Maryland Senate election =

- November 4, 2014

All 47 seats in the Maryland Senate 24 seats needed for a majority
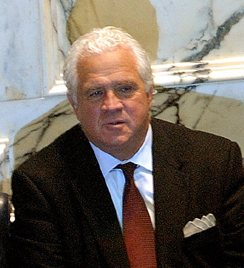

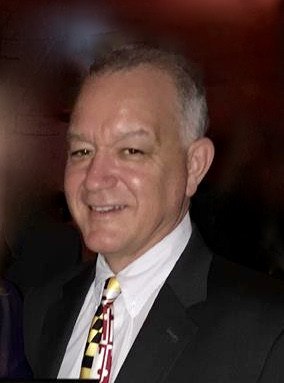
	Majority party	Minority party
Leader	Mike Miller	David R. Brinkley (lost renomination)
Party	Democratic	Republican
Leader since	January 21, 1987	September 24, 2013
Leader's seat	27th District	4th district
Last election	35 seats	12 seats
Seats before	35	12
Seats won	33	14
Seat change	▼2	▲2
Popular vote	948,127	655,037
Percentage	58.72%	40.57%
- Democratic gain Republican gain Democratic hold Republican hold Democratic: 50–60% 60-70% 70–80% 80–90% >90% Republican: 40–50% 50–60% 60–70% 70–80% >90%
President before election
Mike Miller
Democratic
Elected President
Mike Miller
Democratic

The 2014 Maryland Senate election were held on November 4, 2014, to elect senators in all 47 districts of the Maryland Senate. Members were elected in single-member constituencies to four-year terms. These elections were held concurrently with various federal and state elections, including for Governor of Maryland.

== Background ==
The Democratic Party had held majority control of the Senate since the beginning of the 20th century. The closest that the Republican Party had come to gaining control since then was in 1918, when Democrats held a thin 14 to 13 majority.

In the 2014 elections, Governor Martin O'Malley was term-limited and Republicans sought to succeed him with businessman Larry Hogan. Capitalizing on a national red wave, the party successfully retook the governor's office and picked up nine seats in the General Assembly, including two seats in the Maryland Senate. Despite these gains, Democrats still retained their veto-proof supermajorities in both chambers of the Maryland General Assembly.

== Overview ==
=== Summary by district ===
District	Incumbent	Party	Elected Senator	Party
1st	George C. Edwards	Rep	George C. Edwards (Note: Ran unopposed in the general election.)	Rep
2nd	Christopher B. Shank	Rep	Christopher B. Shank	Rep
3rd	Ronald N. Young	Dem	Ronald N. Young	Dem
4th	David R. Brinkley	Rep	Michael Hough	Rep
5th	Joseph M. Getty	Rep	Joseph M. Getty	Rep
6th	Norman R. Stone Jr.	Dem	Johnny Ray Salling	Rep
7th	J. B. Jennings	Rep	J. B. Jennings	Rep
8th	Kathy Klausmeier	Dem	Kathy Klausmeier	Dem
9th	Allan H. Kittleman	Rep	Gail H. Bates	Rep
10th	Delores G. Kelley	Dem	Delores G. Kelley	Dem
11th	Robert Zirkin	Dem	Robert Zirkin	Dem
12th	Edward J. Kasemeyer	Dem	Edward J. Kasemeyer	Dem
13th	James N. Robey	Dem	Guy Guzzone	Dem
14th	Karen S. Montgomery	Dem	Karen S. Montgomery	Dem
15th	Brian Feldman (Note: Feldman was appointed on September 12, 2013, to succeed Democrat Robert J. Garagiola, who resigned on September 1, 2013.)	Dem	Brian Feldman	Dem
16th	Brian Frosh	Dem	Susan C. Lee	Dem
17th	Jennie M. Forehand	Dem	Cheryl Kagan	Dem
18th	Richard Madaleno	Dem	Richard Madaleno	Dem
19th	Roger Manno	Dem	Roger Manno	Dem
20th	Jamie Raskin	Dem	Jamie Raskin	Dem
21st	James Rosapepe	Dem	James Rosapepe	Dem
22nd	Paul G. Pinsky	Dem	Paul G. Pinsky	Dem
23rd	Douglas J. J. Peters	Dem	Douglas J. J. Peters	Dem
24th	Joanne C. Benson	Dem	Joanne C. Benson	Dem
25th	Ulysses Currie	Dem	Ulysses Currie	Dem
26th	C. Anthony Muse	Dem	C. Anthony Muse	Dem
27th	Thomas V. Miller Jr.	Dem	Thomas V. Miller Jr.	Dem
28th	Thomas M. Middleton	Dem	Thomas M. Middleton	Dem
29th	Roy Dyson	Dem	Stephen Waugh	Rep
30th	John Astle	Dem	John Astle	Dem
31st	Bryan Simonaire	Rep	Bryan Simonaire	Rep
32nd	James E. DeGrange Sr.	Dem	James E. DeGrange Sr.	Dem
33rd	Edward R. Reilly	Rep	Edward R. Reilly	Rep
34th	Nancy Jacobs	Rep	Robert Cassilly	Rep
35th	Barry Glassman	Rep	H. Wayne Norman Jr.	Rep
36th	Steve Hershey (Note: Hershey was appointed on August 12, 2013, to succeed Republican E. J. Pipkin, who resigned on August 12, 2013.)	Rep	Steve Hershey	Rep
37th	Richard F. Colburn	Rep	Adelaide C. Eckardt	Rep
38th	James N. Mathias Jr.	Dem	James N. Mathias Jr.	Dem
39th	Nancy J. King	Dem	Nancy J. King	Dem
40th	Catherine Pugh	Dem	Catherine Pugh	Dem
41st	Lisa Gladden	Dem	Lisa Gladden	Dem
42nd	James Brochin	Dem	James Brochin	Dem
43rd	Joan Carter Conway	Dem	Joan Carter Conway	Dem
44th	Verna L. Jones	Dem	Shirley Nathan-Pulliam	Dem
45th	Nathaniel J. McFadden	Dem	Nathaniel J. McFadden	Dem
46th	Bill Ferguson	Dem	Bill Ferguson	Dem
47th	Victor R. Ramirez	Dem	Victor R. Ramirez	Dem

=== Closest races ===
Seats where the margin of victory was under 10%:

1. State Senate district 3, 1.7%
2. State Senate district 30, 2.7%
3. State Senate district 6, 2.8% (gain)
4. State Senate district 42, 3.3%
5. State Senate district 38, 3.5%

== Retiring incumbents ==
=== Democrats ===
1. District 6: Norman R. Stone Jr. retired.
2. District 13: James N. Robey retired.
3. District 16: Brian Frosh retired to run for Attorney General of Maryland.
4. District 17: Jennie M. Forehand retired.

=== Republicans ===
1. District 9: Allan H. Kittleman retired to run for Howard County executive.
2. District 34: Nancy Jacobs retired.
3. District 35: Barry Glassman retired to run for Harford County executive.

== Incumbents defeated ==
=== In primary elections ===
==== Democrats ====
1. District 44: Verna L. Jones lost renomination to Shirley Nathan-Pulliam.

==== Republicans ====
1. District 4: David R. Brinkley lost renomination to Michael Hough.
2. District 37: Richard F. Colburn lost renomination to Adelaide Eckardt.

=== In the general election ===
==== Democrat ====
1. District 29: Roy Dyson lost to Stephen Waugh.

== Predictions ==
Source	Ranking	As of
Governing	Safe D	October 20, 2014

== Detailed results ==
=== District 1 ===
Maryland Senate District 1 election, 2014
Party	Candidate	Votes	%
Republican	George C. Edwards (incumbent)	30,374	99.2
Write-in		240	0.8
Republican hold			

=== District 2 ===
Maryland Senate District 2 election, 2014
Party	Candidate	Votes	%
Republican	Christopher B. Shank (incumbent)	26,023	98.1
Write-in		504	1.9
Republican hold			

=== District 3 ===
Results by precinct Young: 50–60%; 60–70%; Stottlemyer: 50–60%; 60–70%; 70–80%; >90%; Tie

Maryland Senate District 3 election, 2014
Party	Candidate	Votes	%
Democratic	Ronald N. Young (incumbent)	18,307	50.8
Republican	Corey Stottlemyer	17,693	49.1
Write-in		59	0.2
Democratic hold			

=== District 4 ===
Maryland Senate District 4 Republican primary election, 2014
Party	Candidate	Votes	%
Republican	Michael Hough	8,946	67.7
Republican	David R. Brinkley (incumbent)	4,261	32.3

Results by precinct Hough: 50–60%; 60–70%; 70–80%; Rupli: >90%

Maryland Senate District 4 election, 2014
Party	Candidate	Votes	%
Republican	Michael Hough	31,414	67.7
Democratic	Dan Rupli	14,873	32.1
Write-in		117	0.3
Republican hold			

=== District 5 ===
Results by precinct Getty: 70–80%; 80–90%

Maryland Senate District 5 election, 2014
Party	Candidate	Votes	%
Republican	Joseph M. Getty (incumbent)	37,406	78.5
Democratic	Anita Riley	10,203	21.4
Write-in		58	0.1
Republican hold			

=== District 6 ===
Maryland Senate District 6 Democratic primary election, 2014
Party	Candidate	Votes	%
Democratic	Johnny Olszewski	5,259	62.1
Democratic	Russ Mirabile	3,215	37.9

Results by precinct Salling: 40–50%; 50–60%; Olszewski: 40–50%; 50–60%; 70–80%; 80–90%; >90%

Maryland Senate District 6 election, 2014
Party	Candidate	Votes	%
Republican	Johnny Ray Salling	14,916	47.7
Democratic	Johnny Olszewski	14,065	44.9
Independent	Scott M. Collier	2,285	7.3
Write-in		26	0.1
Republican gain from Democratic			

=== District 7 ===
Results by precinct Jennings: 50–60%; 60–70%; 70–80%; 80–90%

Maryland Senate District 7 election, 2014
Party	Candidate	Votes	%
Republican	J. B. Jennings (incumbent)	36,913	74.6
Democratic	Kim Letke	12,502	25.3
Write-in		46	0.1
Republican hold			

=== District 8 ===
Maryland Senate District 8 Democratic primary election, 2014
Party	Candidate	Votes	%
Democratic	Katherine Klausmeier (incumbent)	8,016	81.7
Democratic	John Bishop	1,800	18.3

Results by precinct Klausmeier: 50–60%; 60–70%; 70–80%; 80–90%; >90%; Lofstad: 50–60%; Tie

Maryland Senate District 8 election, 2014
Party	Candidate	Votes	%
Democratic	Katherine Klausmeier (incumbent)	23,638	61.2
Republican	Erik Lofstad	14,938	38.7
Write-in		37	0.1
Democratic hold			

=== District 9 ===
Maryland Senate District 9 Democratic primary election, 2014
Party	Candidate	Votes	%
Democratic	Ryan Frederic	4,298	51.6
Democratic	Daniel L. Medinger	4,031	48.4

Results by precinct Bates: 50–60%; 60–70%; 70–80%; 80–90%; Frederic: 50–60%; 60–70%; Tie

Maryland Senate District 9 election, 2014
Party	Candidate	Votes	%
Republican	Gail H. Bates	33,109	65.8
Democratic	Ryan Frederic	17,132	34.1
Write-in		56	0.1
Republican hold			

=== District 10 ===
Maryland Senate District 10 Democratic primary election, 2014
Party	Candidate	Votes	%
Democratic	Delores G. Kelley (incumbent)	9,048	65.9
Democratic	Stephanie Boston	2,565	18.7
Democratic	Pat Kelly	2,110	15.4

Maryland Senate District 10 election, 2014
Party	Candidate	Votes	%
Democratic	Delores G. Kelley (incumbent)	30,448	98.0
Write-in		634	2.0
Democratic hold			

=== District 11 ===
Maryland Senate District 11 election, 2014
Party	Candidate	Votes	%
Democratic	Robert Zirkin (incumbent)	30,201	97.5
Write-in		765	2.5
Democratic hold			

=== District 12 ===
Results by precinct Kasemeyer: 40–50%; 50–60%; 60–70%; 70–80%; Pippy: 50–60%; 60–70%

Maryland Senate District 12 election, 2014
Party	Candidate	Votes	%
Democratic	Edward J. Kasemeyer (incumbent)	21,986	58.6
Republican	Jesse Pippy	15,481	41.3
Write-in		47	0.1
Democratic hold			

=== District 13 ===
Results by precinct Guzzone: 50–60%; 60–70%; 70–80%; Venkatesan: 50–60%; 60–70%

Maryland Senate District 13 election, 2014
Party	Candidate	Votes	%
Democratic	Guy Guzzone	25,026	62.3
Republican	Jody Venkatesan	15,126	37.6
Write-in		26	0.1
Democratic hold			

=== District 14 ===
Results by precinct Montgomery: 50–60%; 60–70%; 70–80%; 80–90%; Howard: 50–60%; 60–70%; Tie

Maryland Senate District 14 election, 2014
Party	Candidate	Votes	%
Democratic	Karen S. Montgomery (incumbent)	22,225	57.5
Republican	Franklin "Frank" Delano Howard, Jr.	16,399	42.4
Write-in		41	0.1
Democratic hold			

=== District 15 ===
Results by precinct Feldman: 50–60%; 60–70%; 70–80%; Ficker: 50–60%

Maryland Senate District 15 election, 2014
Party	Candidate	Votes	%
Democratic	Brian Feldman (incumbent)	19,925	60.4
Republican	Robin Ficker	13,028	39.5
Write-in		44	0.1
Democratic hold			

=== District 16 ===
Maryland Senate District 16 Democratic primary election, 2014
Party	Candidate	Votes	%
Democratic	Susan C. Lee	12,196	85.1
Democratic	Hugh Hill	1,911	13.3
Democratic	J'aime Drayton	231	1.6

Results by precinct Lee: 50–60%; 60–70%; 70–80%; 80–90%; Marks: 50–60%

Maryland Senate District 16 election, 2014
Party	Candidate	Votes	%
Democratic	Susan C. Lee	28,603	70.0
Republican	Meyer Marks	12,208	29.9
Write-in		53	0.1
Democratic hold			

=== District 17 ===
Maryland Senate District 17 Democratic primary election, 2014
Party	Candidate	Votes	%
Democratic	Cheryl Kagan	4,713	54.6
Democratic	Luiz R. S. Simmons	3,917	45.4

Results by precinct Kagan: 60–70%; 70–80%; >90%

Maryland Senate District 17 election, 2014
Party	Candidate	Votes	%
Democratic	Cheryl Kagan	18,526	68.1
Republican	Steve Zellers	8,496	31.2
Write-in		169	0.6
Democratic hold			

=== District 18 ===
Maryland Senate District 18 Democratic primary election, 2014
Party	Candidate	Votes	%
Democratic	Richard Madaleno (incumbent)	7,320	58.3
Democratic	Dana Beyer	5,238	41.7

Maryland Senate District 18 election, 2014
Party	Candidate	Votes	%
Democratic	Richard Madaleno (incumbent)	25,540	97.6
Write-in		632	2.4
Democratic hold			

=== District 19 ===
Results by precinct Manno: 50–60%; 60–70%; 70–80%; 80–90%; Gonzalez: 50–60%; Tie

Maryland Senate District 19 election, 2014
Party	Candidate	Votes	%
Democratic	Roger Manno (incumbent)	22,030	67.7
Republican	Felix Ed Gonzalez, II	10,446	32.1
Write-in		55	0.2
Democratic hold			

=== District 20 ===
Maryland Senate District 20 election, 2014
Party	Candidate	Votes	%
Democratic	Jamie Raskin (incumbent)	26,470	98.7
Write-in		359	1.3
Democratic hold			

=== District 21 ===
Maryland Senate District 21 election, 2014
Party	Candidate	Votes	%
Democratic	Jim Rosapepe (incumbent)	22,241	97.6
Write-in		554	2.4
Democratic hold			

=== District 22 ===
Results by precinct Pinsky: 70–80%; 80–90%; >90%; Tie

Maryland Senate District 22 election, 2014
Party	Candidate	Votes	%
Democratic	Paul G. Pinsky (incumbent)	21,471	86.7
Republican	Janice Denise Fountaine	3,245	13.1
Write-in		35	0.1
Democratic hold			

=== District 23 ===
Maryland Senate District 23 Democratic primary election, 2014
Party	Candidate	Votes	%
Democratic	Douglas J. J. Peters (incumbent)	11,071	77.1
Democratic	David Grogan	3,291	22.9

Maryland Senate District 23 election, 2014
Party	Candidate	Votes	%
Democratic	Douglas J. J. Peters (incumbent)	36,004	98.8
Write-in		446	1.2
Democratic hold			

=== District 24 ===
Maryland Senate District 24 Democratic primary election, 2014
Party	Candidate	Votes	%
Democratic	Joanne C. Benson (incumbent)	7,695	56.0
Democratic	Bobby G. Henry, Jr.	6,047	44.0

Maryland Senate District 24 election, 2014
Party	Candidate	Votes	%
Democratic	Joanne C. Benson (incumbent)	29,692	99.2
Write-in		238	0.8
Democratic hold			

=== District 25 ===
Maryland Senate District 25 election, 2014
Party	Candidate	Votes	%
Democratic	Ulysses Currie (incumbent)	8,173	58.7
Democratic	Melony G. Griffith	5,253	37.7
Democratic	Terry Goolsby	503	3.6

Results by precinct Currie: 50–60%; 70–80%; 80–90%; >90%

Maryland Senate District 25 election, 2014
Party	Candidate	Votes	%
Democratic	Ulysses Currie (incumbent)	29,097	91.9
Republican	Kory Boone	1,902	6.0
Write-in		657	0.1
Democratic hold			

=== District 26 ===
Maryland Senate District 26 Democratic primary election, 2014
Party	Candidate	Votes	%
Democratic	C. Anthony Muse (incumbent)	7,676	50.7
Democratic	Veronica L. Turner	5,002	33.0
Democratic	Brian Patrick Woolfolk	1,351	8.9
Democratic	Jerry J. Mathis	1,116	7.4

Results by precinct Muse: 60–70%; 70–80%; 80–90%; >90%; Tie

Maryland Senate District 26 election, 2014
Party	Candidate	Votes	%
Democratic	C. Anthony Muse (incumbent)	29,753	89.6
Republican	Kelley Howells	3,370	10.1
Write-in		93	0.3
Democratic hold			

=== District 27 ===
Results by precinct Miller: 50–60%; 60–70%; 70–80%; 80–90%; >90%; Peed: 50–60%; 60–70%; Tie

Maryland Senate District 27 election, 2014
Party	Candidate	Votes	%
Democratic	Thomas V. Mike Miller, Jr. (incumbent)	28,667	62.5
Republican	Jesse Allen Peed	17,168	37.4
Write-in		62	0.1
Democratic hold			

=== District 28 ===
Maryland Senate District 28 Republican primary election, 2014
Party	Candidate	Votes	%
Republican	Allan Donnelly	2,153	65.0
Republican	Josh Castle	1,161	35.0

Results by precinct Middleton: 50–60%; 60–70%; 70–80%; 80–90%; Donnelly: 50–60%; Tie

Maryland Senate District 28 election, 2014
Party	Candidate	Votes	%
Democratic	Thomas M. Middleton (incumbent)	27,300	66.8
Republican	Allan Donnelly	13,493	33.0
Write-in		61	0.1
Democratic hold			

=== District 29 ===
Maryland Senate District 29 Republican primary election, 2014
Party	Candidate	Votes	%
Republican	Stephen Waugh	3,107	43.7
Republican	Cindy Jones	2,071	29.1
Republican	Larry Jarboe	1,939	27.2

Results by precinct Waugh: 50–60%; 60–70%; 70–80%; Dyson: 50–60%; 60–70%; Tie

Maryland Senate District 29 election, 2014
Party	Candidate	Votes	%
Republican	Stephen Waugh	22,183	56.5
Democratic	Roy Dyson (incumbent)	17,065	43.4
Write-in		28	0.1
Republican gain from Democratic			

=== District 30 ===
Maryland Senate District 30 Republican primary election, 2014
Party	Candidate	Votes	%
Republican	Don Quinn	3,200	50.3
Republican	Eric Delano Knowles	3,158	49.7

Results by precinct Astle: 50–60%; 60–70%; 70–80%; 80–90%; Quinn: 50–60%; 60–70%; Tie

Maryland Senate District 30 election, 2014
Party	Candidate	Votes	%
Democratic	John Astle (incumbent)	22,461	51.3
Republican	Don Quinn	21,284	48.6
Write-in		51	0.1
Democratic hold			

=== District 31 ===
Results by precinct Simonaire: 50–60%; 60–70%; 70–80%; 80–90%; Harman: 50–60%

Maryland Senate District 31 election, 2014
Party	Candidate	Votes	%
Republican	Bryan Simonaire (incumbent)	28,338	72.1
Democratic	Anthony Scott Harman	10,929	27.8
Write-in		34	0.1
Republican hold			

=== District 32 ===
Results by precinct DeGrange: 50–60%; 60–70%; 70–80%; 80–90%; Barber: 50–60%

Maryland Senate District 32 election, 2014
Party	Candidate	Votes	%
Democratic	James E. DeGrange Sr. (incumbent)	19,102	59.0
Republican	Larry Barber	13,270	41.0
Write-in		28	0.1
Democratic hold			

=== District 33 ===
Maryland Senate District 33 election, 2014
Party	Candidate	Votes	%
Republican	Edward R. Reilly (incumbent)	41,745	98.0
Write-in		845	2.0
Republican hold			

=== District 34 ===
Maryland Senate District 34 Democratic primary election, 2014
Party	Candidate	Votes	%
Democratic	Mary-Dulany James	4,705	61.1
Democratic	Art Helton	2,997	38.9

Results by precinct Cassilly: 50–60%; 60–70%; 70–80%; James: 50–60%; 60–70%; 70–80%; Tie

Maryland Senate District 34 election, 2014
Party	Candidate	Votes	%
Republican	Robert Cassilly	22,042	57.2
Democratic	Mary-Dulany James	16,459	42.7
Write-in		62	0.2
Republican hold			

=== District 35 ===
Maryland Senate District 35 Republican primary election, 2014
Party	Candidate	Votes	%
Republican	H. Wayne Norman Jr.	6,384	66.8
Republican	Thomas J. Wilson	3,175	33.2

Results by precinct Norman: 50–60%; 60–70%; 70–80%; 80–90%

Maryland Senate District 35 election, 2014
Party	Candidate	Votes	%
Republican	H. Wayne Norman Jr.	31,065	73.9
Democratic	Bridget Kelly	10,944	26.0
Write-in		33	0.1
Republican hold			

=== District 36 ===
Maryland Senate District 36 Republican primary election, 2014
Party	Candidate	Votes	%
Republican	Steve Hershey (incumbent)	6,007	56.0
Republican	Richard A. Sossi	4,720	44.0

Results by precinct Hershey: 50–60%; 60–70%; 70–80%; Tilghman: 50–60%

Maryland Senate District 36 election, 2014
Party	Candidate	Votes	%
Republican	Steve Hershey	27,876	67.1
Democratic	Benjamin Tilghman	13,612	32.8
Write-in		30	0.1
Republican hold			

=== District 37 ===
Maryland Senate District 37 Republican primary election, 2014
Party	Candidate	Votes	%
Republican	Adelaide Eckardt	6,302	56.9
Republican	Richard F. Colburn (incumbent)	4,769	43.1

Results by precinct Eckardt: 40–50%; 50–60%; 60–70%; 70–80%; 80–90%; Robinson: 50–60%; 60–70%; 70–80%; 80–90%; >90%; Tie

Maryland Senate District 37 election, 2014
Party	Candidate	Votes	%
Republican	Adelaide Eckardt	26,397	65.9
Democratic	Christopher R. Robinson	13,528	33.8
Write-in		121	0.3
Republican hold			

=== District 38 ===
Results by precinct Mathias: 50–60%; 60–70%; 70–80%; McDermott: 40–50%; 50–60%; 60–70%; 70–80%; Tie

Maryland Senate District 38 election, 2014
Party	Candidate	Votes	%
Democratic	Jim Mathias (incumbent)	20,221	51.7
Republican	Mike McDermott	18,868	48.2
Write-in		23	0.1
Democratic hold			

=== District 39 ===
Maryland Senate District 39 election, 2014
Party	Candidate	Votes	%
Democratic	Nancy J. King (incumbent)	18,808	97.2
Write-in		536	2.8
Democratic hold			

=== District 40 ===
Maryland Senate District 40 election, 2014
Party	Candidate	Votes	%
Democratic	Catherine Pugh (incumbent)	19,786	98.0
Write-in		395	2.0
Democratic hold			

=== District 41 ===
Maryland Senate District 41 Democratic primary election, 2014
Party	Candidate	Votes	%
Democratic	Lisa Gladden (incumbent)	14,473	91.3
Democratic	Will Hanna	1,376	8.7

Maryland Senate District 41 election, 2014
Party	Candidate	Votes	%
Democratic	Lisa Gladden (incumbent)	27,392	98.7
Write-in		365	1.3
Democratic hold			

=== District 42 ===
Maryland Senate District 42 Democratic primary election, 2014
Party	Candidate	Votes	%
Democratic	James Brochin (incumbent)	7,777	69.4
Democratic	Connie DeJuliis	3,431	30.6

Results by precinct Brochin: 50–60%; 60–70%; 70–80%; Robinson: 50–60%; 60–70%; 70–80%; 80–90%; Tie

Maryland Senate District 42 election, 2014
Party	Candidate	Votes	%
Democratic	James Brochin (incumbent)	23,976	51.6
Republican	Tim Robinson	22,409	48.3
Write-in		48	0.1
Democratic hold			

=== District 43 ===
Maryland Senate District 43 Democratic primary election, 2014
Party	Candidate	Votes	%
Democratic	Joan Carter Conway (incumbent)	9,821	64.5
Democratic	Bill Henry	5,404	35.5

Maryland Senate District 43 election, 2014
Party	Candidate	Votes	%
Democratic	Joan Carter Conway (incumbent)	25,666	98.2
Write-in		483	1.8
Democratic hold			

=== District 44 ===
Maryland Senate District 44 Democratic primary election, 2014
Party	Candidate	Votes	%
Democratic	Shirley Nathan-Pulliam	9,851	74.1
Democratic	Verna L. Jones (incumbent)	3,450	25.9

Results by precinct Nathan-Pulliam: 50–60%; 60–70%; 70–80%; 80–90%; >90%; Reiter: 50–60%

Maryland Senate District 44 election, 2014
Party	Candidate	Votes	%
Democratic	Shirley Nathan-Pulliam	26,261	80.2
Republican	Bernard Reiter	6,412	19.6
Write-in		51	0.2
Democratic hold			

=== District 45 ===
Maryland Senate District 45 Democratic primary election, 2014
Party	Candidate	Votes	%
Democratic	Nathaniel J. McFadden (incumbent)	9,179	80.7
Democratic	Julius Henson	2,192	19.3

Maryland Senate District 45 election, 2014
Party	Candidate	Votes	%
Democratic	Nathaniel J. McFadden (incumbent)	22,203	98.8
Write-in		270	1.2
Democratic hold			

=== District 46 ===
Maryland Senate District 46 Democratic primary election, 2014
Party	Candidate	Votes	%
Democratic	Bill Ferguson (incumbent)	7,282	89.8
Democratic	Mateen Rasul Zar	829	10.2

Maryland Senate District 46 election, 2014
Party	Candidate	Votes	%
Democratic	Bill Ferguson (incumbent)	17,320	97.3
Write-in		484	2.7
Democratic hold			

=== District 47 ===
Maryland Senate District 47 Democratic primary election, 2014
Party	Candidate	Votes	%
Democratic	Victor R. Ramirez (incumbent)	4,981	68.4
Democratic	Walter Lee James, Jr.	2,296	31.6

Maryland Senate District 47 election, 2014
Party	Candidate	Votes	%
Democratic	Victor Ramirez (incumbent)	15,582	99.0
Write-in		160	1.0
Democratic hold			

== See also ==
- Elections in Maryland
- 2014 United States elections
- 2014 Maryland gubernatorial election
- 2014 Maryland Attorney General election
- 2014 Maryland Comptroller election
- 2014 United States House of Representatives elections in Maryland
- 2014 United States gubernatorial elections
- 2014 Maryland House of Delegates election
