= Senator Waugh =

Senator Waugh may refer to:

- Mike Waugh (1955–2014), Pennsylvania State Senate
- Stephen Waugh (politician) (born 1964), Maryland State Senate
