= Roy Dyson =

American politician

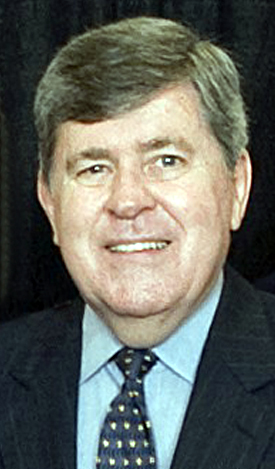

Member of the Maryland Senate from the 29th district
- In office January 11, 1995 – January 14, 2015
- Preceded by: Bernie Fowler
- Succeeded by: Stephen M. Waugh

Member of the U.S. House of Representatives from Maryland's 1st district
- In office January 3, 1981 – January 3, 1991
- Preceded by: Robert Bauman
- Succeeded by: Wayne Gilchrest

Personal details
- Born: Royden Patrick Dyson; November 15, 1948 (age 77) Great Mills, Maryland, U.S.
- Party: Democratic
- Education: University of Maryland, College Park; University of Baltimore

Royden Patrick Dyson (born November 15, 1948), is a former American Democratic politician from Maryland. Dyson served in the United States House of Representatives from 1980 to 1991 and as a Maryland state senator from 1995 to 2015.

== Background ==
Dyson was born in Great Mills, Maryland. Dyson attended private schools and graduated from Great Mills High School in 1966. He attended the University of Maryland, College Park, and the University of Baltimore in 1968, 1969, and 1970. He also served as a legislative assistant in the United States House of Representatives from 1973 to 1974 for U.S. Representative William D. Ford of Michigan.

== Political career ==
In 1975, Dyson was elected to the Maryland House of Delegates for district 29. The following year, Dyson ran for Congress in the Eastern Shore-based 1st District, losing to two-term Republican Robert Bauman. In 1978 he was a delegate in 1978 to the Democratic National Issues Conference. In 1980, Dyson narrowly defeated Bauman after Bauman suffered a sex scandal in the weeks prior to election day.

=== 1988 election ===
In the 1988 election, Dyson was dogged by allegations of improper contributions from defense contractors. His Republican opponent was Wayne Gilchrest, a high school teacher who had never run for office before. Dyson won by a smaller than projected margin of 1,431 votes.

During his campaign, Dyson's chief of staff Tom Pappas died by suicide by jumping from a building while on a trip to New York with Dyson to meet with executives from Unisys. Shortly before the trip, Pappas was the subject of a front-page Washington Post article, accusing Pappas of misconduct. Dyson refuted the article's claims as untrue. Others critiqued the front page piece for obfuscating facts and suggesting innuendo to titillate readers.

=== Later years ===
In 1990, Gilchrest defeated Dyson 57% to 43% despite again being badly outspent by Dyson, who received substantial PAC contributions in all of his later campaigns.

In 1995, Dyson was elected to the Maryland Senate, representing District 29 (St. Mary's County and southern Calvert County). He served in the Maryland Senate until January 14, 2015 after losing the 2014 Maryland Senate Election to Republican Steve Waugh.

== Notes ==
U.S. House of Representatives
Preceded by Robert Bauman	Member of the U.S. House of Representatives from Maryland's 1st congressional district 1981–1991	Succeeded by Wayne Gilchrest
U.S. order of precedence (ceremonial)
Preceded by Michael J. Harrington as Former U.S. Representative	Order of precedence of the United States as Former U.S. Representative	Succeeded by Robin Tallon as Former U.S. Representative
