= Arthur Ellis (Maryland politician) =

American politician (born 1961)

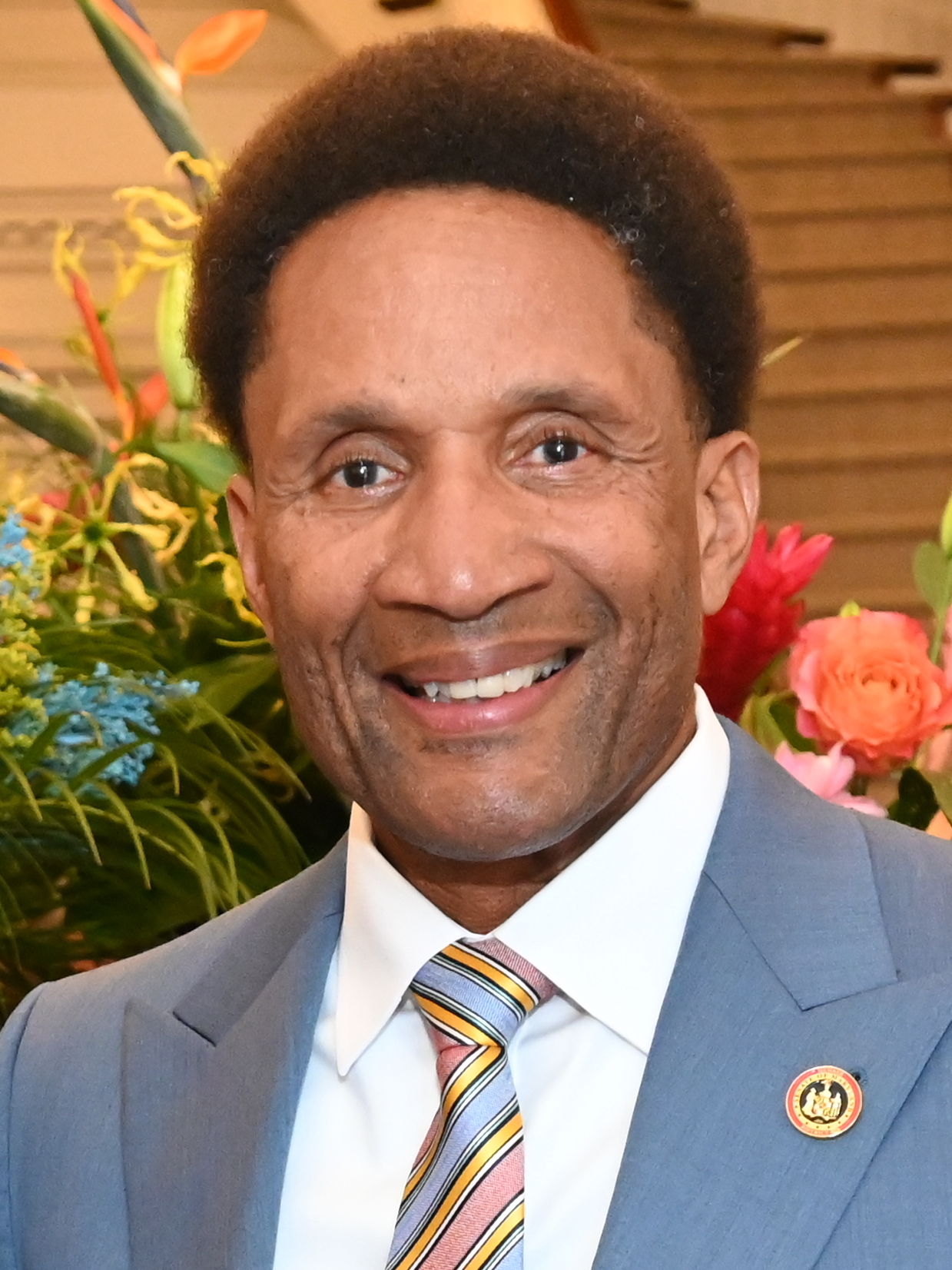
- Ellis in 2025

Member of the Maryland Senate from the 28th district
- Incumbent
- Assumed office January 9, 2019
- Preceded by: Thomas M. Middleton

Personal details
- Born: Arthur Carr Ellis; July 26, 1961 (age 65) Portland Parish, Jamaica
- Party: Democratic
- Spouse: Rosalind
- Children: 2
- Education: University of Maryland, College Park (BS); City University of New York (MS)
- Website: Campaign website

Military service
- Branch/service: United States Air Force
- Years of service: 1983–2001
- Rank: Second Lieutenant
- Awards: Air Force Commendation Medal

Arthur Carr Ellis (born July 26, 1961) is an American politician and accountant who has served as a member of the Maryland Senate from the 28th district since 2019. A member of the Democratic Party, he unsuccessfully ran in the 2026 U.S. House of Representatives election in Maryland's 5th congressional district, losing to state delegate Adrian Boafo in the Democratic primary.

== Early life and education ==
Ellis was born in Portland Parish, Jamaica, on July 26, 1961. He graduated from the University of Maryland, College Park with a Bachelor of Science degree in chemistry and agriculture in 1983, and the City University of New York (CUNY) with a Master of Science in accountancy in 1990.

== Career ==
Ellis served in the United States Air Force from 1983 to 1989, and in the U.S. Air Force Reserves until 2001, attaining the rank of second lieutenant. He returned to the United States and moved to Maryland after being discharged from the military after being injured while serving. After graduating from CUNY, he became an associate at Mitchell & Titus, and afterwards worked as an instructor for the Maryland Association of Certified Public Accountants, the University of the District of Columbia, and the University of Maryland Global Campus until 1993. From 2008 to 2017, he worked as a volunteer leader at the University of Maryland Extension.

2018 Democratic primary results by precinct Ellis: 50–60%; 60–70%; 70–80%; Middleton: 50–60%; 60–70%; 70–80%

Ellis became involved in politics as a member of the Charles County NAACP chapter, becoming its communications director in 2016. In March 2017, he criticized the state's $900,000 purchase and preservation of land where Josiah Henson was enslaved before escaping to freedom, arguing that the money would be better spent on youth programs. He ran for the Maryland Senate in 2018, challenging six-term incumbent Thomas M. Middleton. Ellis defeated Middleton in an upset in the Democratic primary on June 26, 2018, receiving 52.0 percent of the vote and edging out Middleton by 651 votes. Following Middleton's defeat, the Maryland Republican Party targeted the district, backing businessman and Charles County Republican Party chairman Bill Dotson, who Ellis defeated in the general election on November 6, 2018, with 66.2 percent of the vote.

== Maryland Senate ==
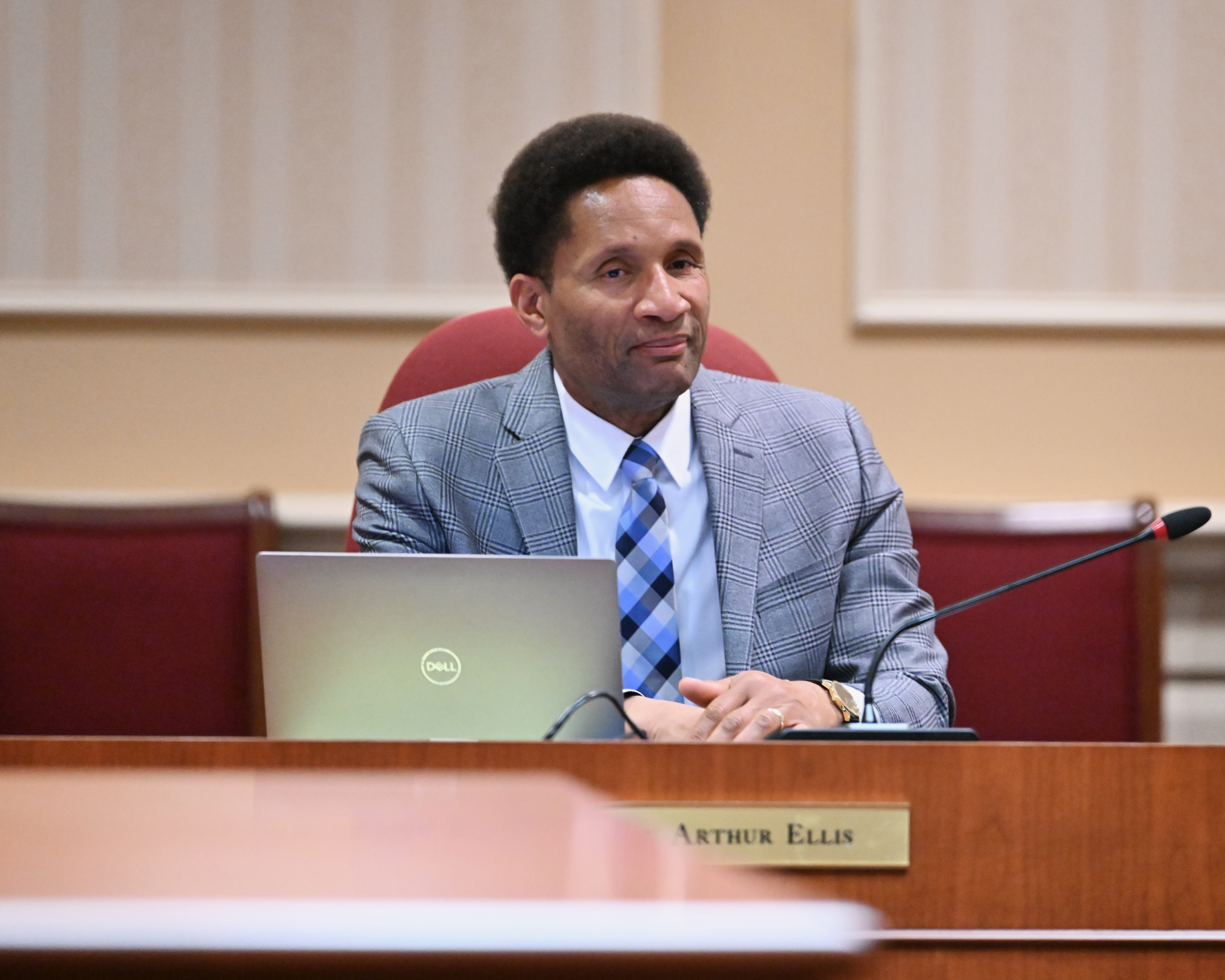
Ellis in the Senate Finance Committee, 2024

Ellis was sworn into the Maryland Senate on January 9, 2019. He was a member of the Education, Health, and Environmental Affairs Committee from 2019 to 2022, afterwards serving on the Finance Committee until 2027. From 2020 to 2027, he served as an assistant deputy majority leader, and from 2025 to 2027, he served as the vice chair of the Senate Rules Committee.

=== Mid-decade redistricting protest ===
In February 2026, after Senate President Bill Ferguson told reporters that mid-decade redistricting would not be a priority for the Senate, Ellis announced on the Senate floor that he would not register his presence for full Senate sessions for the remainder of the legislative session unless Ferguson brought the mid-decade redistricting bill up for a floor vote. He would continue to attend committee meetings and present the bills he introduced to committees. Following his remarks, Ellis told reporters that he had been intimidated by Democratic leaders for his position on redistricting and, after calling a straw poll on the issue during a meeting of Senate Democrats earlier in the week, was called into an hour-long meeting with Ferguson in which the Senate president told Ellis "how inappropriate that bringing it up in the caucus meeting was". A spokesperson for Ferguson said that meeting between him and Ellis never took place, confirmed that Ellis brought up redistricting their caucus meeting, and said that no senators knew Ellis would bring up redistricting on the Senate floor, though said that it was "totally within [Ellis's] rights" to do so. During a press conference the next day, Ferguson rejected allegations that he had intimidated Ellis and would have a conversation with him "to make sure that I understand where he's coming from", but continued to oppose bringing redistricting legislation to the floor for a vote. He also said Ellis's protest would not affect the Senate's ability to function and that no disciplinary action is expected against him, citing the Senate rules, which holds that any senators present on the floor are present for quorum regardless of whether they register their presence. A few days later, Ellis called for Ferguson to step down over his decision to continue blocking a vote on redistricting. Ellis ended his redistricting protest on March 6, 2026, with the bill to redraw Maryland's congressional districts failing to pass out of the Senate Rules Committee.

In March 2026, Ellis claimed that Ferguson had blocked all of the bills he introduced that year in response to his redistricting protest, which Ferguson denied. He also accused Ferguson and state senator Craig Zucker, the chair of the capital budget subcommittee, of deauthorizing $400,000 in state funding for projects within his district as a result of the protest, which would "disenfranchise" Black people within Charles County. Both senators denied this, with Zucker saying that both projects were not using the authorized money, which led the subcommittee to reallocate the funding to more immediate projects.

In August 2026, the Maryland General Assembly convened for a special session to consider a proposed constitutional amendment that would exempt Maryland's congressional districts from redistricting guidelines in the Constitution of Maryland. Ahead of the session, Ellis participated in a rally in Annapolis where he called on legislators to support the redistricting amendment.

=== 2026 congressional campaign ===
On February 17, 2026, Ellis told The Baltimore Sun that he would not seek re-election in 2026, opting instead to run for Congress in Maryland's 5th congressional district. He was defeated by state delegate Adrian Boafo in the Democratic primary election on June 23, 2026, placing sixth with 2.9 percent of the vote.

== Political positions ==
During his 2018 campaign, Ellis described himself as a progressive Democrat.

=== Education ===
During the 2020 legislative session, Ellis voted against an amendment to the Blueprint for Maryland's Future that would provide $150 million in grants toward programs to improve students' behavioral health, arguing that it could "stigmatize poor kids and create a long-lasting trail of unemployability for these children". In January 2021, he said he supported overriding Governor Larry Hogan's veto of the Blueprint.

During the 2022 legislative session, Ellis introduced a bill that would split up the College of Southern Maryland and use the college's La Plata campus to create a new Charles County Community College.

=== Electoral reform ===
During the 2021 legislative session, Ellis introduced a bill to require the makeup of local election boards to be based on the party affiliation of voters in each county, rather than the governor's political party. He also supported a bill that would eliminate at-large county commissioner districts, requiring commissioners to be elected to individual districts.

In November 2025, Ellis said he would support a bill to redraw Maryland's congressional districts to make Maryland's 1st congressional district more favorable for Democrats in response to Republican mid-decade redistricting efforts in various red states. In May 2026, following the U.S. Supreme Court's decision in Louisiana v. Callais, Ellis called on leaders of the Maryland General Assembly to convene a special session to pass new congressional redistricting maps to counteract Republican efforts to eliminate majority-minority districts in various southern states.

In March 2026, during debate on a bill that would require public buses to travel near voting centers to drop off or pick up people from those places, Ellis introduced a bill that would require early voting centers to provide an accessible path to the entrance doors for voters with physical disabilities. The amendment was rejected in a 9–34 vote.

=== Environment ===
During the 2021 legislative session, Ellis introduced an amendment to the Climate Solutions Now Act that would prioritize tree planting projects in underserved areas, and another amendment requiring the state's climate transition workgroup to include a veteran, a formerly incarcerated person, two women and two NAACP members; both amendments were adopted.

=== Policing ===
During the 2021 legislative session, Ellis introduced a bill that would prohibit school resource officers from entering schools unless instructed or in the event of an emergency. The bill failed to move out of committee.

In 2022, Ellis said he supported overriding Governor Larry Hogan's veto of a bill to repeal the Law Enforcement Officer's Bill of Rights.

=== Transportation ===
During his 2018 campaign, Ellis said he supported upgrades to U.S. 301 and Maryland Routes 5 and 210, as well as expanding MARC rail services to Charles County. During the 2020 legislative session, he introduced a bill to provide $27 million toward building a light rail line in southern Maryland along Route 5, and another to provide inmates with Maryland Motor Vehicle Administration-administered identification cards and license renewal before their release.

During the 2021 legislative session, Ellis introduced a bill to rename Indian Head Highway to the President Barack Obama Highway.

== Personal life ==
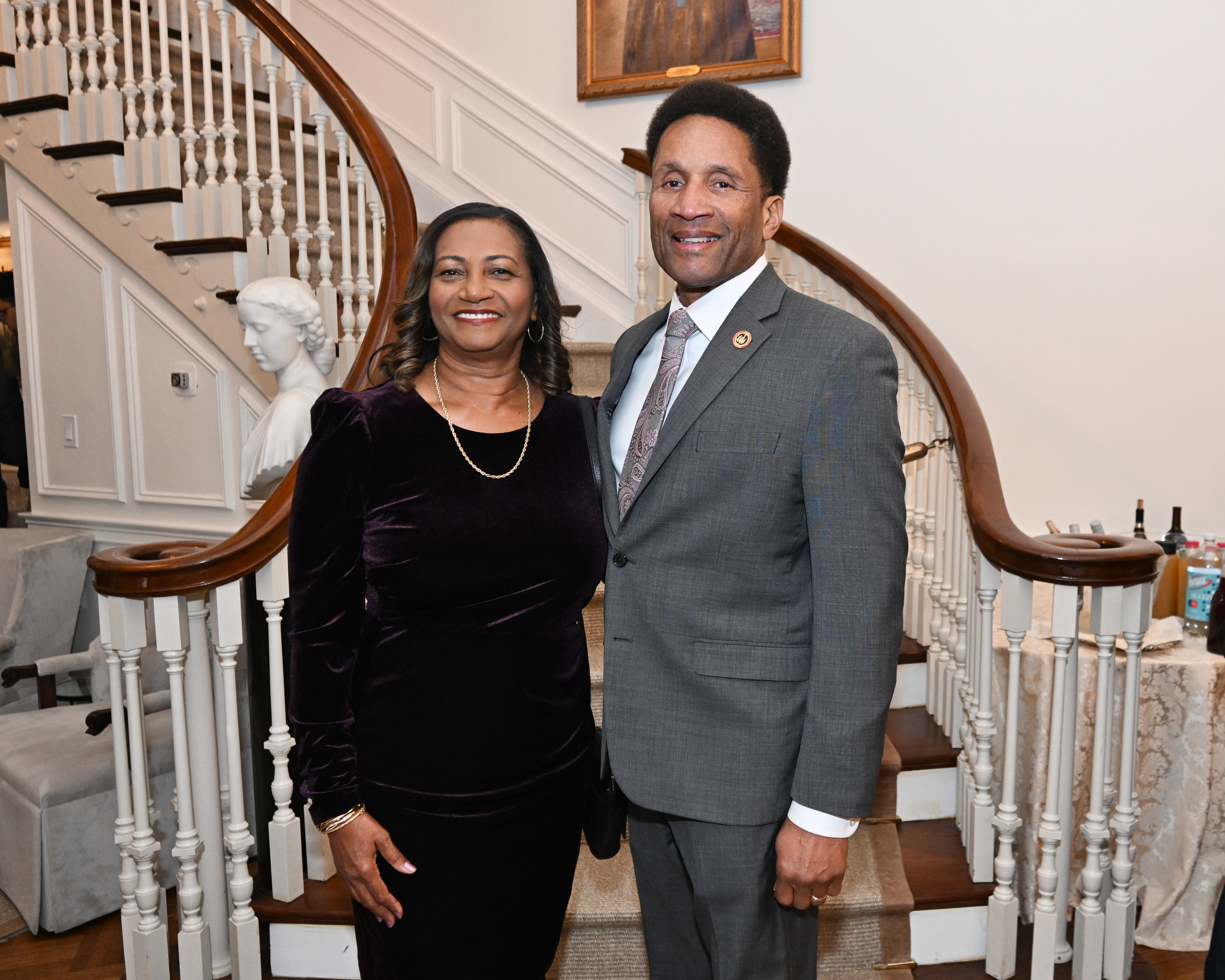
Ellis and his wife at Government House, 2026

Ellis is married to his wife, Rosalind. Together, they have two children.

Ellis was inducted into the Charles County NAACP Hall of Fame in 2018.

== Electoral history ==
Maryland Senate District 28 Democratic primary election, 2018
Party	Candidate	Votes	%
Democratic	Arthur Ellis	8,309	52.0
Democratic	Thomas M. Middleton (incumbent)	7,663	48.0

Maryland Senate District 28 election, 2018
Party	Candidate	Votes	%
Democratic	Arthur Ellis	37,585	66.2
Republican	Bill Dotson	19,063	33.6
Write-in		145	0.3

Maryland Senate District 28 election, 2022
Party	Candidate	Votes	%
Democratic	Arthur Ellis (incumbent)	30,168	67.0
Republican	Michelle Talkington	14,765	32.8
Write-in		64	0.1
