= Stephen Waugh (politician) =

American politician (born 1964)

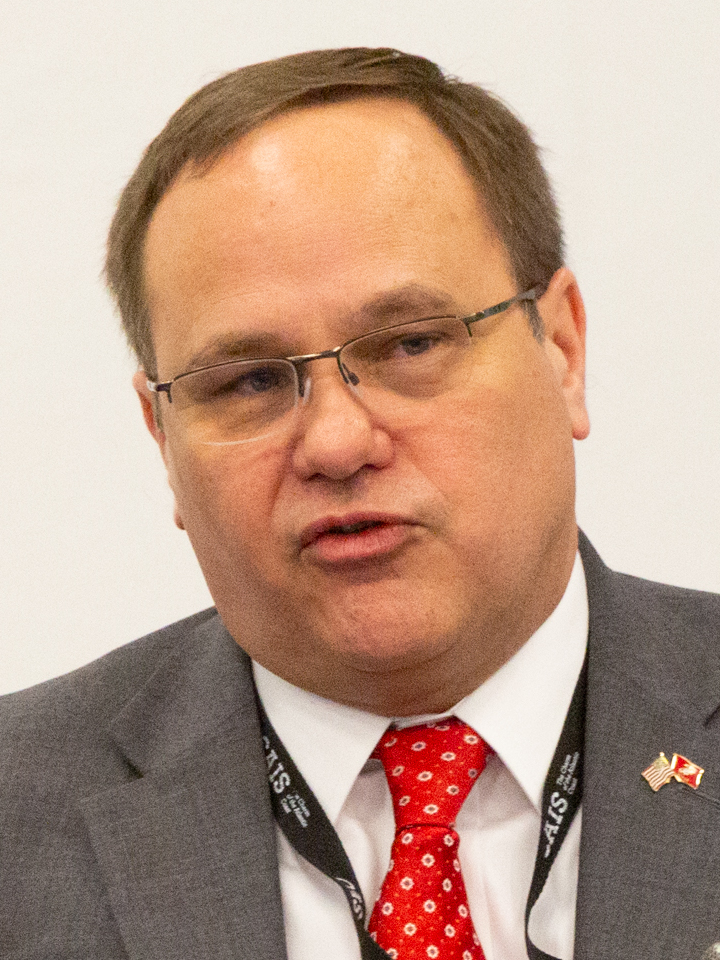
- Waugh in 2019

Member of the Maryland Senate from the 29th district
- In office January 14, 2015 – January 9, 2019
- Preceded by: Roy Dyson
- Succeeded by: Jack Bailey

Personal details
- Born: June 16, 1964 (age 62) Annapolis, Maryland, U.S.
- Party: Republican
- Spouse: Myra
- Children: 2
- Education: United States Naval Academy (BS); University of Phoenix (MBA)

Military service
- Branch/service: United States Marine Corps
- Years of service: 1986–2006
- Unit: 3rd Light Armored Reconnaissance Battalion

Stephen M. Waugh (born June 16, 1964) is an American politician who was a member of the Maryland Senate representing District 29 in Calvert and St. Mary's counties from 2015 to 2019.

== Early life and education ==
Waugh was born in Annapolis, Maryland, on June 16, 1964. He graduated from the Marine Military Academy before attending the United States Naval Academy, where he earned a Bachelor of Science degree in aerospace engineering in 1986. After graduating, Waugh served in the United States Marine Corps, serving as an AV-8B pilot, aviation safety officer, and forward air controller, and attaining the rank of chief of combat in the 3rd Light Armored Reconnaissance Battalion before leaving the Marine Corps in 2006 to attend the University of Phoenix, where he earned a Master of Business Administration degree in technology management.

== Career ==
After graduating from the University of Phoenix, Waugh worked as the director of Bowhead Support Services' Patuxent River Business Unit from 2006 to 2007, afterwards working as a systems engineer at the Applied Physics Laboratory in southern Maryland. He served as an alternate member of the Calvert County Board of Appeals from 2011 to 2014.

Waugh first became involved with politics in 2008 after what he described as the country taking a "pretty serious left turn". He unsuccessfully ran for the Maryland Senate in District 27 in 2010, losing to incumbent state senator Roy Dyson with 48.5 percent of the vote.

=== Maryland Senate ===
Waugh was elected to the Maryland Senate in 2014 after defeating Dyson. He was sworn into the Maryland Senate on January 14, 2015. He served as a member of the Health and Environmental Affairs Committee during his entire tenure, including on its comptroller issues, education, and health subcommittees. Waugh was considered one of the most effective Republican legislators in the Maryland General Assembly during his tenure.

During the 2015 legislative session, Waugh introduced a bill to ban wind energy projects east of the Naval Air Station Patuxent River, which he said would interfere with the air station's specialized radar system used to test the stealth capabilities of aircraft.

During the 2017 legislative session, Waugh opposed bills that would require the Maryland Department of Transportation to prioritize road construction projects using a scoring system, give the attorney general of Maryland the ability to pursue cases against Trump administration policies, and ban fracking in Maryland. He also criticized President Donald Trump's proposal to cut all funding for the Chesapeake Bay Program in his 2018 fiscal year budget.

In August 2017, following the Unite the Right rally in Charlottesville, Virginia, Waugh supported the removal of the Roger B. Taney Monument from the Maryland State House, saying that he didn't want it to "become a rallying cry for white nationalists".

During the 2018 legislative session, Waugh criticized a bill to remove the Maryland Board of Public Works from hearing funding appeals from local officials, calling it the "great mistake of this session". He also introduced a bill to repeal sections of the Firearms Safety Act of 2013, including a ban on the sale of assault weapons. Following the Parkland high school shooting, Waugh led four bills aimed at addressing school safety, including one that would put armed school resource officers in every public school. Waugh also voted to override Governor Larry Hogan's veto on a bill prohibiting colleges from asking about criminal history on student applications, the only Republican member of the Maryland General Assembly to do so.

2018 Republican primary results by precinct Bailey: 50–60%; 60–70%; 70–80%; 80–90%; Waugh: 50–60%; 60–70%; Tie

Waugh ran for a second term in 2018. Governor Hogan—displeased with Waugh's legislative record, including on votes for legislation backed by Senate President Thomas V. Miller Jr. and veto overrides during the 2018 legislative session—supported his opponent, former Maryland Natural Resources police officer Jack Bailey, who defeated Waugh in the Republican primary election on June 26, 2018, by a margin of 752 votes. Waugh was the only Republican state senator to lose their primary election that year.

In a November 2018 interview with Maryland Independent, Waugh blamed Hogan for his loss, saying that his endorsement led to a tidal shift in party loyalty that overwhelmed his campaign. Following his defeat, he applied to a doctorate program in engineering.

== Personal life ==
Waugh is married to his wife, Myra. Together, they have two children.

In November 2011, Waugh and his son were involved in a plane crash at the Chesapeake Ranch Estates airport in Lusby, Maryland, that left him with multiple broken bones. The Federal Aviation Administration conducted an investigation into the plane crash, concluding that the crash occurred because of runway lights shining through the tall tree surrounding the runway, providing a "false sense of safe approach", and Waugh dragging the plane in "a little bit low" for a shallow landing. Waugh also blamed the environmental conditions at the airport, saying that a high overcast blocked all moonlight and starlight, creating a so-called black hole effect. In February 2012, Waugh's son received a "hero proclamation" from the Calvert County Board of County Commissioners for saving his father's life by pulling him from the aircraft following its crash.

== Electoral history ==
Maryland Senate District 29 Republican primary election, 2010
Party	Candidate	Votes	%
Republican	Stephen M. Waugh	7,449	100.0

Maryland Senate District 29 election, 2010
Party	Candidate	Votes	%
Democratic	Roy Dyson (incumbent)	22,368	51.4
Republican	Stephen M. Waugh	21,090	48.5
Write-in		28	0.1

Maryland Senate District 29 Republican primary election, 2014
Party	Candidate	Votes	%
Republican	Steve Waugh	3,107	43.7
Republican	Cindy Jones	2,071	29.1
Republican	Larry Jarboe	1,939	27.2

Maryland Senate District 29 election, 2014
Party	Candidate	Votes	%
Republican	Steve Waugh	22,183	56.5
Democratic	Roy Dyson (incumbent)	17,065	43.4
Write-in		28	0.1

Maryland Senate District 29 Republican primary election, 2018
Party	Candidate	Votes	%
Republican	Jack Bailey	4,339	54.7
Republican	Steve Waugh (incumbent)	3,587	45.3
