= Jack Bailey (Maryland politician) =

American politician (born 1965)

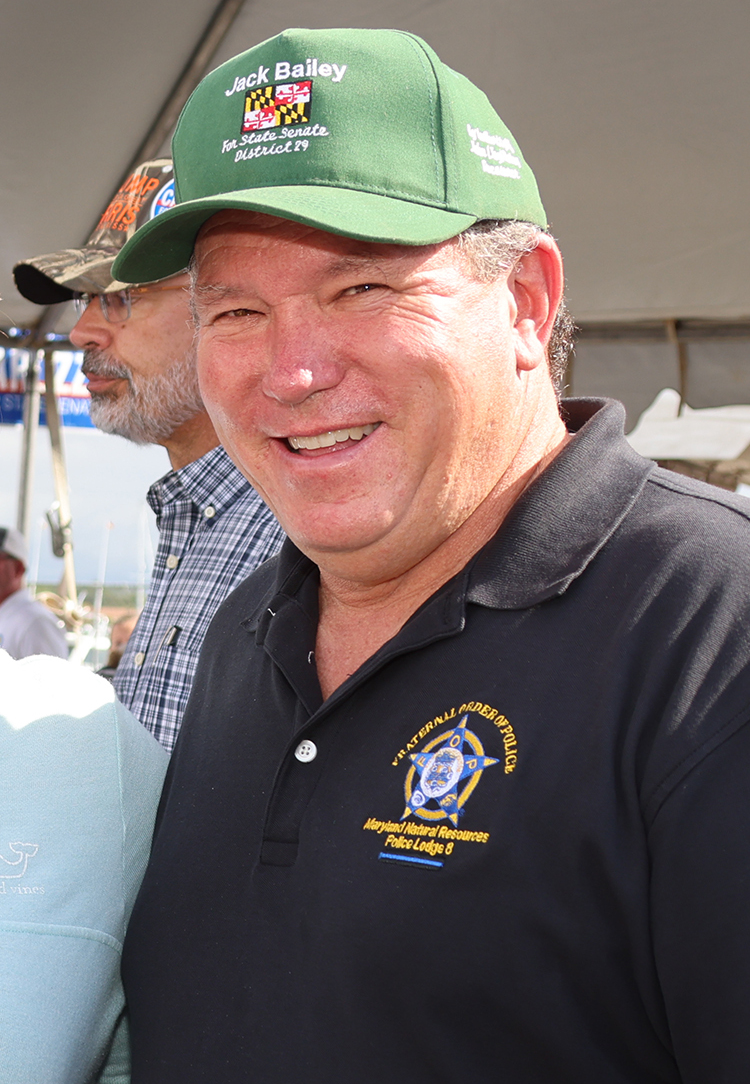
- Bailey in 2021

Member of the Maryland Senate from the 29th district
- Incumbent
- Assumed office January 9, 2019
- Preceded by: Stephen Waugh

Personal details
- Born: John Daniel Bailey; August 27, 1965 (age 61) Elkton, Maryland, U.S.
- Party: Republican
- Spouse: Karin Bailey
- Children: 2
- Education: Johns Hopkins University (BS, MS)
- Occupation: Maryland Natural Resources Police, 1991-2017

John Daniel Bailey (born August 27, 1965) is an American politician who has served as a Republican member of the Maryland Senate from the 29th district, based in Calvert County and St. Mary's County, since 2019.

== Early life and career ==
Bailey was born in Elkton, Maryland on August 27, 1965. He attended St. Mary's Ryken High School in Leonardtown, Maryland and attended the Mount St. Mary's University and Johns Hopkins University, where he earned a B.S. degree in management in 2013 and a M.S. degree in management in 2014. From 1991 to 2017, he worked as a conservation officer for the Maryland Natural Resources Police.

In March 2018, Bailey declared his candidacy for Maryland Senate, seeking a primary challenge to senator Stephen Waugh, who was a target of Governor Larry Hogan for voting with Senate President Thomas V. "Mike" Miller one too many times. During the primary, Hogan endorsed and financed Bailey's campaign. He defeated Waugh in the primary by nearly 800 votes. He defeated Democratic challenger Thomas Brewer in the general election with 60.2 percent of the vote.

Bailey is a life member of the National Rifle Association, who gave him an AQ rating and endorsed his candidacy in 2018.

== In the legislature ==
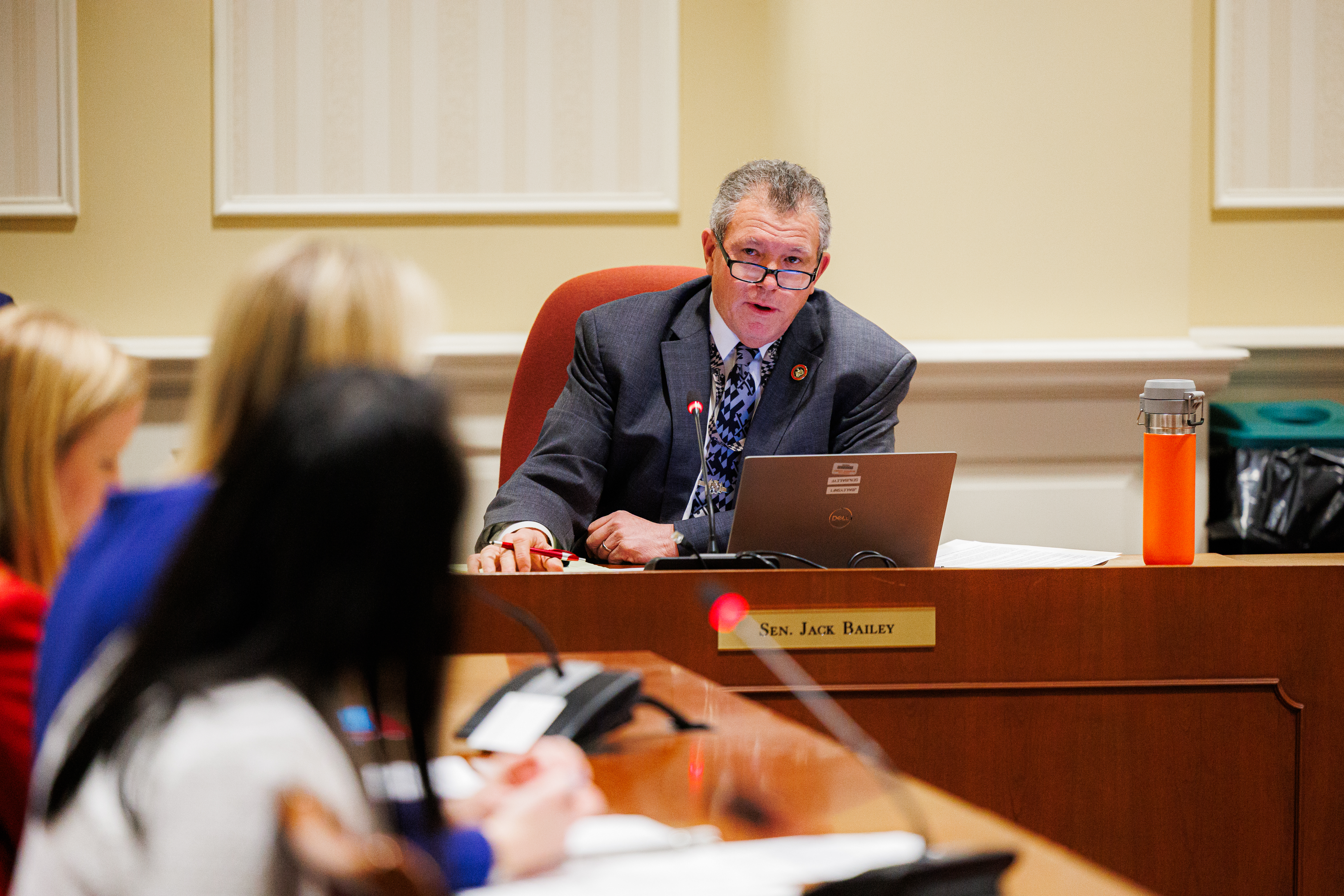
Bailey in the Budget and Taxation Committee, 2024

Bailey was sworn into the Maryland Senate on January 9, 2019.

=== Committee assignments ===
- Member, Judicial Proceedings Committee, 2021–present
- Member, Joint Committee on Ending Homelessness, 2019–present
- Member, Education, Health and Environmental Affairs Committee, 2019–2020 (education subcommittee, 2019–present; alcohol subcommittee, 2020–present)

=== Other memberships ===
- Member, Maryland Veterans Caucus, 2019–present

== Political positions ==
=== Drugs ===
Bailey introduced legislation in the 2019 legislative session that would charge fentanyl dealers with second-degree murder if fentanyl was a contributing cause of someone's death. The bill was rejected by the Senate Judiciary Committee by a vote of 4-7.

Bailey introduced legislation in the 2021 legislative session that would ban the possession of tobacco products by minors on school property. The bill failed due to concerns about a fine it would impose as a civil penalty. He reintroduced the bill during the 2022 legislative session without a fine.

=== Education ===
During his 2018 state senate campaign, Bailey called the Safe to Learn Act — legislation that includes $40 million in school safety funding — a "step in the right location. But that was a small step," adding that local and state government and law enforcement "do 75 percent of what that bill says already."

During a debate on an education reform bill introduced in the 2019 legislative session, Bailey introduced an amendment that would update the bill to include the state's most recent calculation of schools with more than 80 percent of students receiving free or reduced-price meals. The amendment was rejected by a vote of 18-27, but Senate President Bill Ferguson publicly committed to working with Bailey to ask Governor Hogan to process a budget amendment for the additional funding without cutting elsewhere.

During the 2020 legislative session, Bailey voted against a multi-billion-dollar education reform bill, calling it "ill-planned". He also introduced legislation that would exempt substitute teachers from receiving paid sick leave.

Bailey opposed legislation introduced in the 2022 legislative session that would break up the College of Southern Maryland and use the college's La Plata campus to create a new Charles County Community College.

=== Environment ===
During the 2019 legislative session, Bailey voted against legislation that would ban styrofoam food containers in restaurants.

In October 2019, the Maryland League of Conservation Voters gave Bailey a score of 20 percent, the lowest score in the Maryland Senate and tying him with senator Jason C. Gallion.

During a debate on the Climate Solutions Now Act of 2021, Bailey introduced an amendment to the bill that would exempt paratransit from needing to be electrified. It was adopted as a friendly amendment.

In April 2026, Bailey was one of four senators to vote against the Utility RELIEF Act, an omnibus energy bill backed by Governor Wes Moore and Democratic legislative leaders.

=== Guns ===
During his 2018 state senate campaign, Bailey said that he was opposed to the creation of a publicly available gun registry, saying that people who want to get guns could potentially abuse the information. He also said that he would have voted against Maryland's red flag law and bump stock ban.

During a debate on legislation that would prevent people from carrying a gun in or near a polling place, Bailey introduced an amendment that would exempt law enforcement officers, off-duty officers, or retired officers from the bill's provisions. The amendment failed on a 17-29 vote.

=== Immigration ===
During his 2018 state senate campaign, Bailey said that he is opposed to allowing Maryland to be a sanctuary state. In April 2026, he opposed the Community Trust Act, which would require U.S. Immigration and Customs Enforcement to present a judicial warrant to hold someone in a state or local correctional facility and only allows for a person to be detained for ICE under certain situations, saying that it would decrease cooperation between local law enforcement and federal agencies.

=== Policing ===
Bailey co-sponsored legislation during the 2020 legislative session that would strengthen punishment for crimes against minors.

During the 2021 legislative session, Bailey protested legislation that would repeal the Law Enforcement Officers' Bill of Rights in Maryland. He also voted against legislation that would create criminal penalties for police officers who intentionally use excessive force, fail to intervene to stop colleagues, or refuse to aid someone wounded by police. He introduced legislation that would incorporate law enforcement officers and first responders into Maryland hate crime laws.

During the 2022 legislative session, Bailey voted against legislation that would require animal control officers to wear body cameras.

=== Redistricting ===
In February 2026, Bailey said he opposed pursuing mid-decade redistricting in Maryland and opposed holding a vote on a bill that would redraw Maryland's congressional districts to improve the Democratic Party's chances of winning the 1st congressional district, the only congressional district held by Republicans in the state.

=== Social issues ===
Bailey introduced legislation during the 2019 legislative session that would allow people in St. Mary's County to hunt any game bird or game mammal on Sundays during open season. The bill passed and was signed into law by Governor Hogan on April 30, 2019.

Bailey co-sponsored legislation introduced during the 2020 legislative session that would make helmets optional for motorcyclists and their passengers if the motorcycle operator is 21 or older. The bill was rejected by the Senate Judiciary Committee by a vote of 5-6.

During the 2026 legislative session, Bailey introduced a bill to make the megalodon the official state shark.

=== Taxes ===
During the 2021 legislative session, Bailey voted to sustain a gubernatorial veto on a bill that would levy a tax on digital advertising on large tech companies, pointing out that residents could easily go to states neighboring Maryland to avoid paying the state's taxes.

== Electoral history ==
Maryland Senate District 21 Republican Primary Election, 2018
Party	Candidate	Votes	%
Republican	Jack Bailey	4,339	54.7%
Republican	Steve Waugh	3,587	45.3%

Maryland Senate District 21 General Election, 2018
Party	Candidate	Votes	%
Republican	Jack Bailey	28,918	60.2%
Democratic	Thomas Brewer	19,017	39.6%
Other Write-Ins	Other Write-Ins	96	0.2%
