= Thomas M. Middleton =

American politician (born 1945)

Thomas McLain "Mac" Middleton
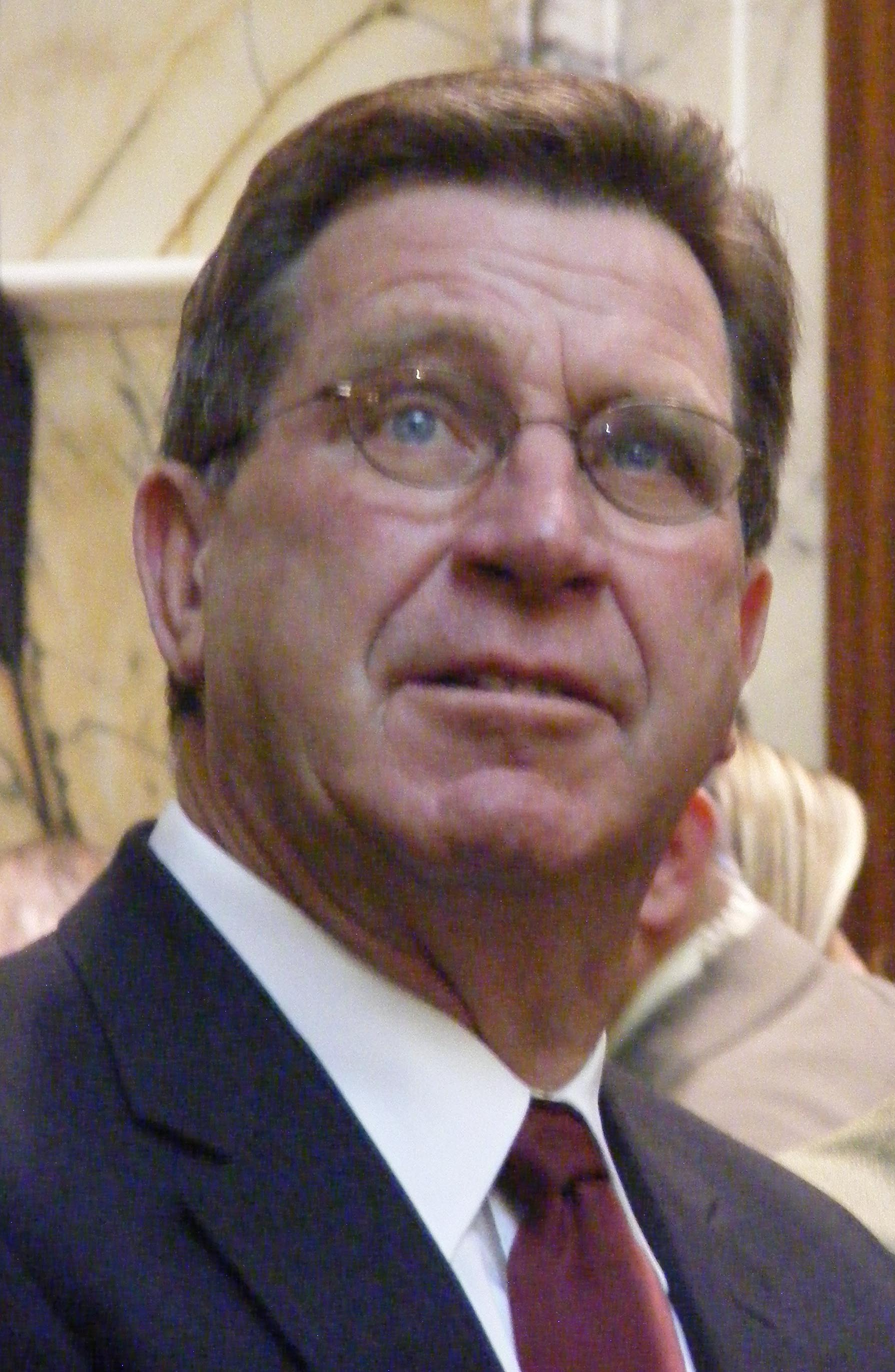
- Middleton in 2008

Member of the Maryland Senate from the 28th district
- In office January 11, 1995 – January 9, 2019
- Preceded by: James C. Simpson
- Succeeded by: Arthur Ellis

Charles County Commissioner
- In office 1986–1994

Personal details
- Born: September 1, 1945 (age 81) La Plata, Maryland, U.S.
- Party: Democratic
- Occupation: Farmer

Thomas McLain "Mac" Middleton (born September 1, 1945) is an American politician from Maryland and a member of the Democratic Party. He served in the Maryland State Senate from 1995 to 2019, representing Maryland's District 28 in southern Charles County.

== Background ==
Middleton grew up in La Plata, Maryland and attended Charles County Community College and Mount St. Mary's College before entering the United States Army. After his service in the United States Army (1968–1971), Middleton became the owner and operator of Cedar Hill Farm near Waldorf, Maryland.

== Political career ==
Middleton's political career began when he was appointed to a four-year term on the Charles County Planning Commission. In 1986, he became a member of the Charles County Commission, the local legislative body for the county. He won a seat in the State Senate in the 1994 election. Middleton was the Chair of the Senate's powerful Finance Committee. He was mentioned as a possible successor to then Senate President Thomas V. Mike Miller, Jr.

In 2005 and 2006, he co-chaired the Special Committee on Employee Rights and Protections. This panel was reportedly created to investigate state government employment actions. The administration of Governor Robert L. Ehrlich, Jr., criticized the effort as a "partisan witch hunt," and a minority report claimed that "the committee's 13-month investigation of the Ehrlich administration was unnecessary, expensive and fruitless."

In 2018, Middleton was ousted in the Gubernatorial Primary Election held on June 26, by a 651-vote margin, by community activist, and CPA, Arthur Ellis, a self-described progressive Democrat.

=== Democratic Party activist ===
In February 2008, Middleton endorsed the candidacy of Barack Obama for president of the United States.

== Legacy ==
In October 2018, Middleton's name was added to the U.S. Route 301 Potomac River bridge, making it officially the Governor Harry W. Nice Memorial/Senator Thomas "Mac" Middleton Bridge.
