= Maryland Association of CPAs =

Organisation for training accountants

Maryland Association of Certified Public Accountants
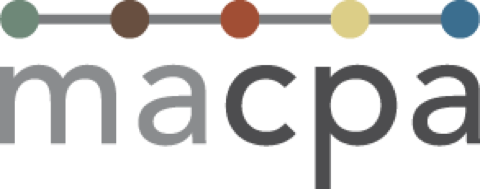
- Abbreviation: MACPA
- Founded: February 12, 1901; 125 years ago
- Tax ID no.: 52-0702331
- Legal status: 501(c)(6) professional association
- Headquarters: Towson, Maryland
- Coordinates: 39.406992°N 76.600716°W
- Chair: Ray Speciale, Esq., CPA,
- Executive Director: J. Thomas Hood III
- Subsidiaries: MACPA Educational Foundation Inc, Business Learning Institute Inc
- Revenue: $5,299,529 (2016)
- Expenses: $5,738,511 (2016)
- Employees: 30 (2015)
- Volunteers: 400 (2015)
- Website: www.macpa.org

The Maryland Association of Certified Public Accountants is a statewide professional association that provides leadership, training, advocacy and resources for its nearly 10,000 certified public accountant-members, who are employed in private practice, industry, government, and education.

As CPAs, the MACPA’s members are business and financial professionals who are committed to protecting the public interest. In Maryland, CPAs must pass a rigorous four-part examination, adhere to strict ethical and professional standards and, beyond college, complete 80 hours of continuing education every two years to be certified by the state.

The MACPA is governed by a board of directors, managed by a full-time staff, guided by a strategic plan, and constantly striving to serve the needs of Maryland's certified public accountants.

== History ==
The MACPA was founded in 1901, less than a year after Maryland Governor John Walter Smith signed into law the third bill in the nation that recognized the need for certified public accountants. Recognizing the importance of trustworthy financial information in a market-based economy, the law established requirements and state licensing for accountants who would meet certain educational, examination and experience standards to ensure the reliability of financial information.

Only certified public accountants are allowed to perform audits, which are often used by banks and other third parties for credit and borrowing purposes.

Max Teichmann became Maryland's first certified public accountant in 1900. Teichmann was a co-founder of the MACPA. Teichmann, considered the father of public accounting in Maryland, lobbied for passage of the certified public accountant law and was recognized as a key figure in the certified public accountant movement. He and a handful of other pioneers established the MACPA on February 12, 1901.

== Advocacy ==
The MACPA is active in state and federal government, monitoring and responding to issues that affect certified public accountants and their clients. The association has been successful in getting important legislation passed and supports legislation through the efforts of committee members and an active, statewide legislative network of members.

Its advocacy efforts are highlighted each year by CPA Day in Annapolis, an annual event in which MACPA members discuss issues of importance in face-to-face meetings with their legislators in the Maryland General Assembly. An active Legislative Executive Committee monitors events and legislation in Annapolis and Washington, D.C., develops position papers on important issues and updates members on the status of key legislation.

The MACPA's political action committee educates legislators about matters that are important to the profession and supports like-minded lawmakers. An active "Key Person Program" recruits volunteer certified public accountants who know state legislators personally and can further educate them on key issues.

== Member benefits ==
MACPA members receive a variety of publications (both print and electronic).

== Member activities ==
Seven chapters and numerous committees. Members are also active in the association's legislative efforts, various special-interest task forces, and in targeted groups like the Career Awareness Program, which tries to convince more young people to study accounting and enter the profession.
