= Maryland Senate =

Upper house of the state legislature

- Maryland General Assembly

Type
- Type: Upper house
- Term limits: None

History
- New session started: January 11, 2023

Leadership
- President: Bill Ferguson (D) since January 8, 2020
- President pro tempore: Malcolm Augustine (D) since January 11, 2023
- Majority Leader: Nancy J. King (D) since January 8, 2020
- Minority Leader: Steve Hershey (R) since January 11, 2023

Structure
- Seats: 47
- Political groups: Majority: Democratic (34); Minority: Republican (13)
- Length of term: 4 years
- Authority: Article III, Section 2, Maryland Constitution
- Salary: $50,330/year

Elections
- Last election: November 3, 2026
- Next election: November 5, 2030
- Redistricting: Legislative Control

Meeting place
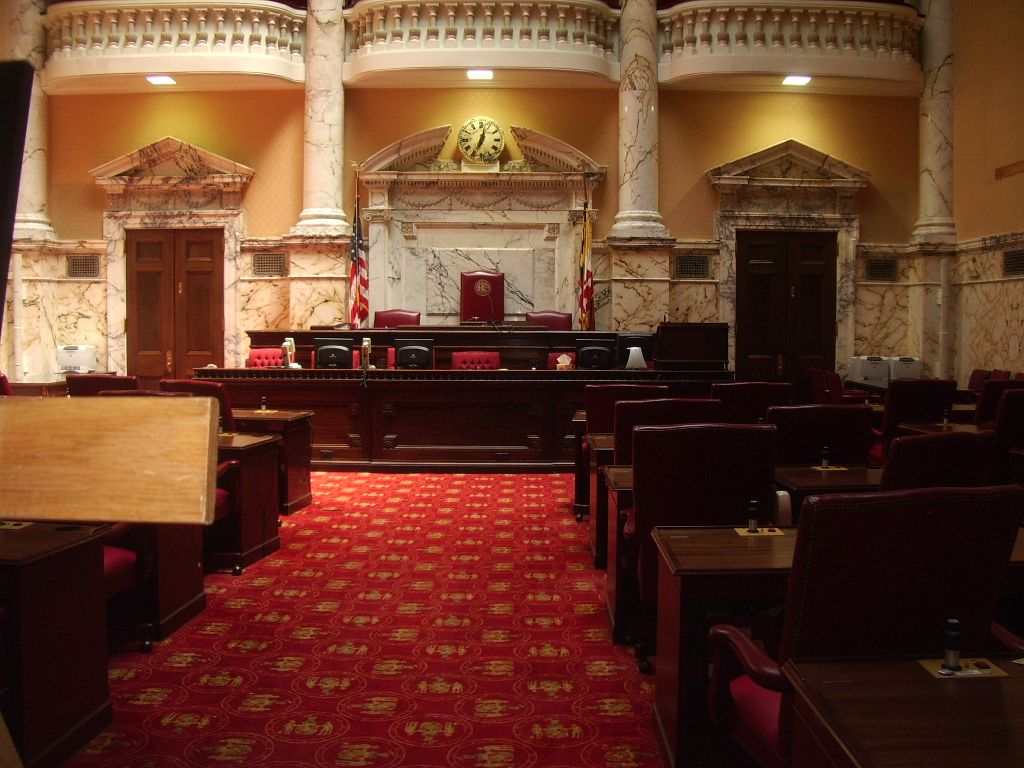
- State Senate Chamber; Maryland State House; Annapolis, MD

Website
- Maryland Senate

Rules
- 2024 Senate of Maryland Rules

The Maryland Senate, sometimes referred to as the Maryland State Senate, is the upper house of the General Assembly, the state legislature of the U.S. state of Maryland. Composed of 47 senators elected from an equal number of constituent single-member districts, the Senate is responsible, along with the Maryland House of Delegates, for passage of laws in Maryland, and for confirming executive appointments made by the governor of Maryland.

It evolved from the upper house of the colonial assembly created in 1650 when Maryland was a proprietary colony controlled by Cecilius Calvert. It consisted of the Governor and members of the Governor's appointed council. With slight variation, the body to meet in that form until 1776, when Maryland, now a state independent of British rule, passed a new constitution that created an electoral college to appoint members of the Senate. This electoral college was abolished in 1838 and members began to be directly elected from each county and Baltimore City. In 1972, because of a Supreme Court decision, the number of districts was increased to 47, and the districts were balanced by population rather than being geographically determined.

To serve in the Maryland Senate, a person must be a citizen of Maryland 25 years of age or older. Elections for the 47 Senate seats are held every four years coincident with the federal election in which the President of the United States is not elected. Vacancies are filled through appointment by the Governor. The Senate meets for three months every year; the rest of the year the work of the Senate is light and most members hold another job during this time. It has been controlled by Democrats since 1900. In the 2018 election, more than two-thirds of the Senate seats were won by Democrats.

Senators elect a president to serve as presiding officer of the legislative body, as well as a president pro tempore. The president appoints chairs and membership of six standing committees, four legislative committees as well as the Executive Nominations and Rules Committees. Senators are also organized into caucuses, including party- and demographically based caucuses. They are assisted in their work by paid staff of the non-partisan Department of Legislative Services and by partisan office staff.

== History ==
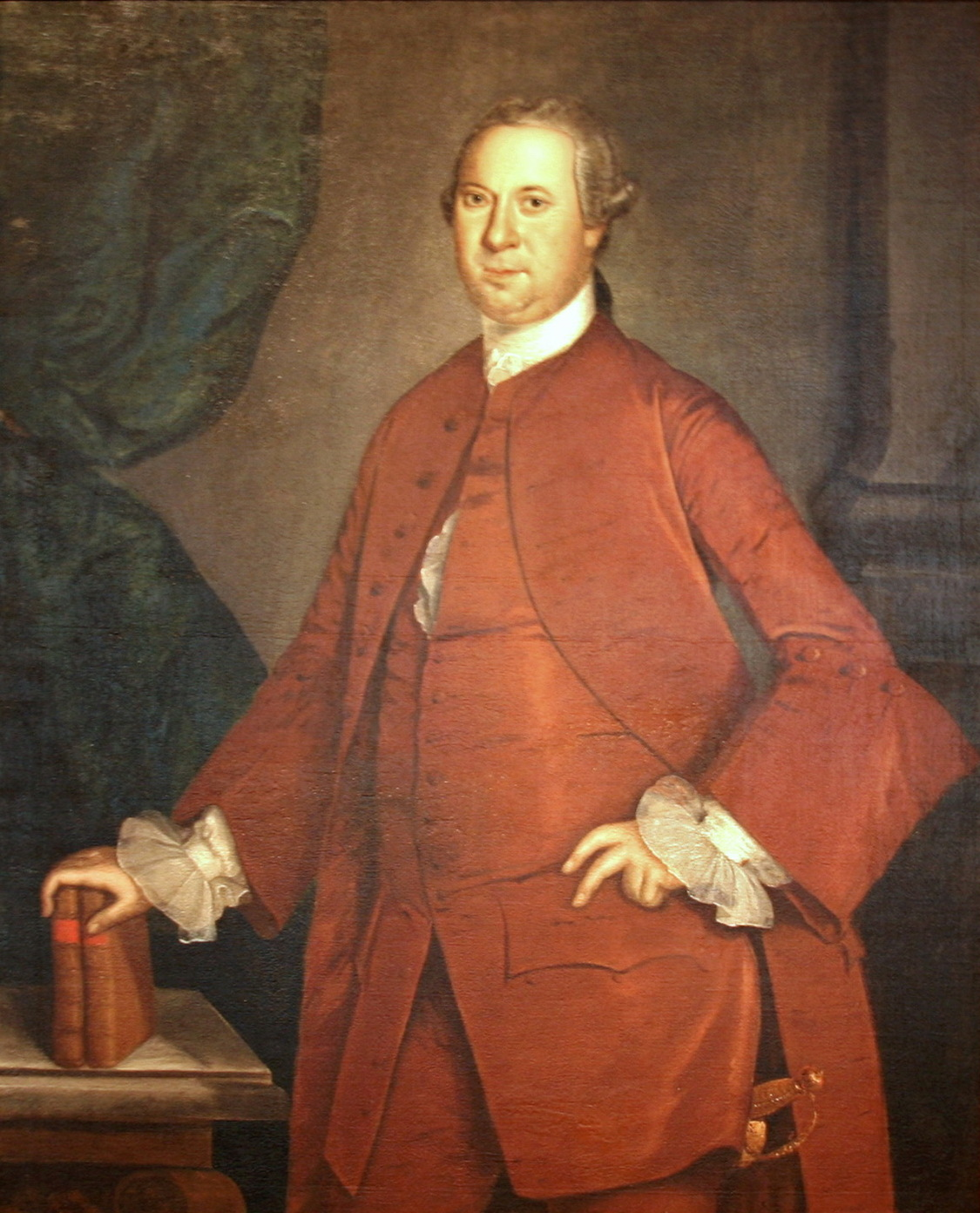
Daniel of St. Thomas Jenifer, the first President of the Maryland Senate

The origins of the Maryland Senate lie in the creation of an assembly during the early days of the Maryland colony. This assembly first met in 1637, making it the longest continuously operating legislative body in the United States. Originally, the assembly was unicameral, but in 1650, the Governor and his appointed council began serving as the upper house of a now bicameral legislature. These appointees had close political and economic ties to the proprietors of the Maryland colony, Cecilius Calvert and his descendants. Thus, the upper house in colonial times often disagreed with the lower house, which was elected, tended to be more populist, and pushed for greater legislative power in the colony.

The upper house was briefly abolished during the English Civil War, as Puritan governors attempted to consolidate control and prevent the return of any proprietary influence. It was again abolished by Governor Josias Fendall in 1660, who sought to create a colonial government based on an elected unicameral legislature like that of the Virginia colony. The position of Governor was removed from the legislature in 1675, but for the following century, its function and powers largely remained the same.

In 1776, following the signing of the Declaration of Independence and the outbreak of the American Revolutionary War, Maryland threw off proprietary control and established a new constitution. Under this new constitution, the upper house of the General Assembly first became known as the Maryland Senate. The new body consisted of fifteen senators appointed to five-year terms by an electoral college. The college, made up of two electors from each county and one each from the cities of Baltimore and Annapolis, was required to select nine senators from the western shore and six from the eastern shore.

The first election under the 1776 constitution took place in 1781, and the system would not change again until 1838. In the interim, a number of problems had cropped up in the appointment process. Under the 1776 constitution, the electoral college selected all of the State Senators, and faced no restrictions, other than the geographic requirement, in how they were selected. As a result, it was commonplace for the electoral college to select a State Senate entirely composed of one political party. Only in 1826, when National Republicans won a majority on the electoral college with a pledge to elect a balanced Senate, was more than one party represented. That year, the electoral college selected 11 National Republicans and four Federalists. Additionally, all vacancies in the State Senate were filled by the Senate itself, which frequently resulted in a disproportionately high share of the Senate having been appointed to fill vacancies. During one session, fourteen out of fifteen senators had been selected to fill vacancies.

In 1836, tensions rose over the State Senate's composition. That year, the Democratic Party won 53% of the statewide vote for the electoral college, but ended up with only nineteen of forty electors. When the Whig electors planned to elect an all-Whig State Senate, the Democratic electors absconded, denying the electoral college a quorum. The refusal to elect a State Senate also prevented the election of a Governor, as Maryland's governors were elected by the legislature. Ultimately, however, the Democrats' position weakened following the State House elections the following month, when the Whigs won an overwhelming majority. The electors returned, providing a quorum, and an all-Whig Senate was elected.

The controversy ultimately resulted in long-term changes to the body in 1838. The electoral college was abolished, terms were lengthened to six years with rotating elections such that a third of the senate would be elected every two years, a single Senator was chosen by direct election from each county and the City of Baltimore, and vacancies were filled by special elections. The Senate no longer acted as the Governor's Council, although they would continue to confirm the Governor's appointments. Constitutional changes altered this new system slightly in 1851, when terms were shortened to four years, and 1864, when Baltimore City was given three Senate districts rather than one, but substantial change to the structure of the Senate did not come again until 1964.

In 1964, the Supreme Court ruled in Reynolds v. Sims that state legislative seats must be apportioned on the principle of one man, one vote. A number of state legislatures, including Maryland, had systems based on geography rather than population, and the court rules that this violated the 14th Amendment. Disproportionate population growth across Maryland since 1838 meant that the principle of one seat per county gave the voters of some counties, such as those on the eastern shore, disproportionate representation. Other counties, especially those in suburban areas, were underrepresented.

A special session of the legislature in 1965 changed the Senate to represent 16 districts and reapportioned the seats, again by county, but did so in such a way as to make the representation more proportional to population than it had been. Thus, the eastern shore, which had previously elected nine senators, elected only four after 1965. This was done to preserve the ideal of having whole counties represented by a single Senator, rather than breaking counties up into multiple districts. A constitutional amendment in 1972 expanded the Senate to 47 members, elected from districts proportional to the population. These districts are reapportioned every ten years based on the United States Census to ensure they remain proportional.

== Powers and legislative process ==
The Maryland Senate, as the upper house of the bicameral Maryland General Assembly, shares with the Maryland House of Delegates the responsibility for making laws in the state of Maryland. Bills are often developed in the period between sessions of the General Assembly by the Senate's standing committees or by individual senators. They are then submitted by senators to the Maryland Department of Legislative Services for drafting of legislative language. Between 2000 and 2005, an average of 907 bills were introduced in the Senate annually during the three-month legislative session. The bill is submitted, and receives the first of three constitutionally mandated readings on the floor of the Senate, before being assigned to a committee. The decision about whether legislation passes is often made in the committees. Committees can hold legislation and prevent it from reaching the Senate floor. The recommendations of committees on bills carry tremendous weight; it is rare for the Senate as a whole to approve legislation that has received a negative committee report. Once a committee has weighed in on a piece of legislation, the bill returns to the floor for second hearing, called the "consideration of committee" report, and a third hearing, which happens just before the floor vote on it.

Once passed by the Senate, a bill is sent to the House of Delegates for consideration. If the House also approves the bill without amendment, it is sent to the Governor. If there is amendment, however, the Senate may either reconsider the bill with amendments or ask for the establishment of a conference committee to work out differences in the versions of the bill passed by each chamber. Once a piece of legislation approved by both houses is forwarded to the Governor, it may either be signed or vetoed. If it is signed, it takes effect on the effective date of the legislation, usually October 1 of that year. If it is vetoed, both the Senate and the House of Delegates must vote by a three-fifths majority to overturn the veto. They may not, however, overturn a veto in the first year of a new term, since the bill would have been passed during the previous session. Additionally, joint resolutions and the budget bill may not be vetoed, although the General Assembly is constitutionally limited in the extent to which it may influence the latter; it may only decrease the Governor's budget proposal, not increase it.

Unlike the House of Delegates, the Senate has the sole responsibility in the state's legislative branch for confirming gubernatorial appointees to positions that require confirmation. After the Governor forwards his nomination to the Senate, the Executive Nominations Committee reviews the nominee and makes a recommendation for confirmation or rejection to the Senate as a whole. Only one gubernatorial nominee in recent history has been rejected; Lynn Buhl, nominated as Maryland Secretary of the Environment by Governor Robert Ehrlich, was rejected over concerns about her qualifications. The Senate also has sole responsibility for trying any persons that have been impeached by the House of Delegates. They must be sworn in before such a trial takes place, and a two-thirds majority is required for conviction of the impeached person.

== Composition ==
Current partisan composition: Democratic senator Republican senator

Affiliation	Party (Shading indicates majority caucus)		Total	Vacant
Affiliation	Democratic	Republican	Total	Vacant
2007–2010 Session	33	14	0	47
2011–2014 Session	35	12	0	47
2015–2018 Session	33	14	0	47
2019–2022 Session	32	15	0	47
2023–2026 Session	34	13	0	47
Latest voting share	72.3%	27.7%		

=== List of current senators ===
District	Name	Party	Start	Residence	Counties
1	Mike McKay	Republican	2023	Cumberland	Allegany, Garrett, Washington
2	Paul D. Corderman	Republican	2020	Hagerstown	Frederick, Washington
3	Karen Lewis Young	Democratic	2023	Frederick	Frederick
4	William Folden	Republican	2023	Myersville	Frederick
5	Justin Ready	Republican	2015	Manchester	Carroll
6	Johnny Ray Salling	Republican	2015	Essex	Baltimore County
7	J. B. Jennings	Republican	2011	Joppa	Baltimore County, Harford
8	Carl W. Jackson	Democratic	2025	Rosedale	Baltimore County
9	Katie Fry Hester	Democratic	2019	Ellicott City	Howard, Montgomery
10	Benjamin Brooks	Democratic	2023	Milford Mill	Baltimore County
11	Shelly L. Hettleman	Democratic	2020	Pikesville	Baltimore County
12	Clarence Lam	Democratic	2019	Columbia	Anne Arundel County, Howard
13	Guy Guzzone	Democratic	2015	Columbia	Howard
14	Craig Zucker	Democratic	2016	Brookeville	Montgomery
15	Brian Feldman	Democratic	2013	Potomac	Montgomery
16	Sara N. Love	Democratic	2024	Bethesda	Montgomery
17	Cheryl Kagan	Democratic	2015	Rockville	Montgomery
18	Jeff Waldstreicher	Democratic	2019	Kensington	Montgomery
19	Benjamin F. Kramer	Democratic	2019	Derwood	Montgomery
20	William C. Smith Jr.	Democratic	2016	Silver Spring	Montgomery
21	James Rosapepe	Democratic	2007	College Park	Anne Arundel, Prince George's
22	Alonzo T. Washington	Democratic	2023	Greenbelt	Prince George's
23	Ron Watson	Democratic	2021	Upper Marlboro	Prince George's
24	Joanne C. Benson	Democratic	2011	Landover	Prince George's
25	Nick Charles	Democratic	2023	Forestville	Prince George's
26	C. Anthony Muse	Democratic	2023	Accokeek	Prince George's
27	Kevin Harris	Democratic	2025	Brandywine	Calvert, Charles, Prince George's
28	Arthur Ellis	Democratic	2019	Indian Head	Charles
29	Jack Bailey	Republican	2019	Mechanicsville	Calvert, St. Mary's
30	Shaneka Henson	Democratic	2025	Annapolis	Anne Arundel
31	Bryan Simonaire	Republican	2007	Glen Burnie	Anne Arundel
32	Pamela Beidle	Democratic	2019	Linthicum	Anne Arundel
33	Dawn Gile	Democratic	2023	Severna Park	Anne Arundel
34	Mary-Dulany James	Democratic	2023	Havre de Grace	Harford
35	Jason C. Gallion	Republican	2019	Churchville	Cecil, Harford
36	Steve Hershey	Republican	2013	Queenstown	Caroline, Cecil, Kent, Queen Anne's
37	Johnny Mautz	Republican	2023	Saint Michaels	Caroline, Dorchester, Talbot, Wicomico
38	Mary Beth Carozza	Republican	2019	Ocean City	Somerset, Wicomico, Worcester
39	Nancy J. King	Democratic	2007	Montgomery Village	Montgomery
40	Antonio Hayes	Democratic	2019	Baltimore	Baltimore City
41	Dalya Attar	Democratic	2025	Baltimore	Baltimore City
42	Chris West	Republican	2019	Towson	Baltimore County, Carroll County
43	Mary L. Washington	Democratic	2019	Baltimore	Baltimore City, Baltimore County
44	Charles E. Sydnor III	Democratic	2020	Baltimore	Baltimore County
45	Cory V. McCray	Democratic	2019	Baltimore	Baltimore City
46	Bill Ferguson	Democratic	2011	Baltimore	Baltimore City
47	Malcolm L. Augustine	Democratic	2019	Cheverly	Prince George's

== Organization ==
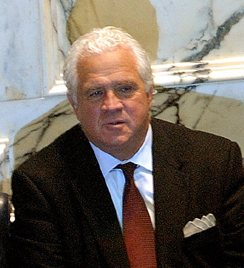
Thomas V. Mike Miller Jr., President of the Maryland Senate 1987 to 2019

Maryland's Senate consists of senators elected from 47 Senate districts. While each senator has the power to introduce and vote on bills and make motions on the floor, various committees, caucuses, and leadership positions help to organize the work of the Senate. Senators elect a President of the Senate, who serves as the presiding officer of the chamber. They also elect a President Pro Tempore, who presides over the chamber when the President is absent. The President of the Maryland Senate has significant influence over legislation that passes through the body through both formal means, such as his ability to appoint committee chairs and leaders of the majority party, and informal means that are less easily defined. These powers place the President of the Maryland Senate among the strongest state legislature presiding officers in the country.

Once legislation is introduced, it is passed to one of the standing committees of the Senate. There are six such committees. As a whole, the Maryland General Assembly has fewer standing committees than any other state legislature in the United States. Each committee has between 10 and 15 members. Four of the standing committees deal primarily with legislation; the Budget and Taxation Committee, the Education, Energy, and Environment Committee, the Finance Committee, and the Judicial Proceedings Committee. The Chairs of these legislative committees have the power to determine whether their committees will hear a bill, and they therefore have significant influence over legislation. The Executive Nominations Committee manages the Senate's responsibility to confirm gubernatorial appointments and makes recommendations of approval and disapproval to the body as a whole. Lastly, the Rules Committee sets the rules and procedures of the body. It also has the power to review legislation that has been introduced by a member of the Senate after the deadline for submission, and decide whether to refer it to a standing committee or let it die. Along with serving on the Senate committees, members of the Senate also serve on a number of joint committees with members of the House of Delegates.

While the committees are established by formal Senate rules, there are a number of caucuses that exercise significant influence over the legislative process. The most powerful of these are the Democratic Caucus and the Republican Caucus, each of which has a leader and a whip, referred to as a majority and minority leader and whip. As Democrats currently control a majority of seats in the Senate, their leader is referred to as the Majority Leader, and their caucus is able to influence legislation to a greater extent than the Republican caucus. The Majority Leader and Minority leader are responsible for managing their party's participation in debate on the floor. Party caucuses also raise and distribute campaign money to assist their candidates. The Legislative Black Caucus of Maryland and Women Legislators of Maryland, caucuses of African-American and female Senators respectively, also play prominent roles in the Senate.

Professional services for members of the Senate and the House of Delegates are provided by the Department of Legislative Services, which is non-partisan. Individual members are also assisted by partisan staff members, and those in leadership positions have additional partisan staff. These staff members help to manage the offices of the senators. Each senator has one year-round administrative assistant, as well as a secretary who assists them during the legislative session. There is also an allowance given to help pay for district offices.

== Membership ==
=== Qualifications ===
To be eligible to run for the Maryland Senate, a person must be a citizen and be at least 25 years old. They must also have lived in the state for at least one year, and must have lived in the district in which they are to run for at least six months, assuming the district has existed with its current boundaries for at least that long. No elected or appointed official of the United States government, including the military, may serve in the Senate, excluding those serving in the military reserves and National Guard. Similarly, no employees of the state government may serve, except for law enforcement officers, firefighters, and rescue workers.

=== Elections and vacancies ===
Members of the Maryland Senate are elected every four years, in off-year elections in the middle of terms for Presidents of the United States. Party nominations are determined by primary elections. The general election for Senate seats and all other state and federal elections in the normal cycle is held on the Tuesday after the first Monday in November. Should a Senate seat become vacant in the middle of a term, because of death, illness, incapacitation, disqualification, resignation, or expulsion of a member of the Senate, that seat is filled by appointment. The Central Committee of the previous Senator's party in the county or counties in which the Senate district lies makes a recommendation to the Governor on whom to appoint to the seat. Within fifteen days of the Central Committee's recommendation being selected, the Governor must appoint that person to the vacant seat.

The 47 districts from which senators are elected are apportioned every ten years on the basis of population. Maryland's constitution explicitly defines the process for the drawing of these districts, requiring that the Governor make a recommendation of a new electoral map and submit it for legislative approval. As of 2005, there were approximately 112,000 people in each district. Each Senate district also elects three Delegates, and incumbent senators and delegates will often run jointly as members of incumbent slates in their districts. It is rare, however, for an incumbent to be challenged.

=== Salaries and benefits ===
Members of the State Senate and the House of Delegates, besides the Senate President and Speaker of the House of Delegates (referred to as the "Presiding Officers"), earn the same salary. These salaries are determined by the General Assembly Compensation Commission. After two terms, 2007-2010 and 2011–2014, during which the salary for members of the General Assembly was $43,500 per year ($56,500 for the Presiding Officers), members began receiving annual raises in 2015 such that, at the start of the 2018 General Assembly Session, they will be earning $50,330 per year, an increase of about 16 percent over four years. The salaries of the Presiding Officers will be increased to $65,371 annually. The increase is being phased in the amounts of approximately $1,707 per year for rank-and-file legislators and $2,218 per year for the Presiding Officers.

Senators can also seek reimbursement for expenses related to meals and lodging during the legislative session, and for certain travel expenses related to their duties at any point during the year. They also have access to benefits received by state employees, including health and life insurance as well as retirement savings plans. Maryland has a voluntary legislator pension plan to which both senators and delegates have access. Besides receiving their own benefits, Senators can award up to $138,000 each year in scholarships to students of their choosing if those students meet requirements set by Senate rules.

=== Current makeup ===
As of January 2023, a majority of seats in the Maryland Senate are held by members of the Democratic Party, with 34 Democrats and 13 Republicans, greater than a two-thirds majority. This dominance is nothing new, as Democrats have had strong majorities in the chamber for decades. Democrats tend to control seats in the large population centers such as Baltimore City, Montgomery County, and Prince George's County, while Republicans control most seats on the Eastern Shore and in western Maryland. The chamber has also had significant numbers of women and African-Americans serve, with women averaging around 36% of the seats and African-Americans around 31%.

=== Leadership ===
On January 8, 2020, Democratic senator Bill Ferguson, from the 46th district, was elected to the position of Senate president following the retirement of the longest-serving Senate president in both Maryland and American history, Thomas V. Mike Miller. Melony G. Griffith, from the 25th District in Prince George's County, is the President Pro Tempore. The Democratic caucus is led by Majority Leader Nancy J. King of the 39th District in Montgomery County. Steve Hershey of the 36th District, which covers Caroline, Cecil, Kent, and Queen Anne's counties, was elected as the minority leader by the Senate's Republican Caucus in 2022.

== Rules and procedures ==
Many rules and procedures in the Maryland Senate are set by the state constitution. Beyond the constitutional mandates, rules in the Senate are developed by the Rules Committee. The Senate and House of Delegates both meet for ninety days following the second Wednesday in January, although these sessions may be extended for up to thirty days by majority votes in both houses, and special sessions may be called by the Governor. The Senate meets in the Senate Chamber of the Maryland State House, which has both gallery seating and a door open to the State House lobby, the latter being mandated by the state constitution. Seating in the Senate is by party, with the leaders of each party choosing the exact seating assignments. Each Senator has offices in Annapolis, in the Miller or James Senate Office Buildings.

A typical session of the Senate begins with a call to order by the President of the Senate. After the call to order, the previous day's journal is approved, petitions are heard, and orders involving committee and leadership appointments or changes to the rules are presented. First, readings of legislation take place. Senators are then given leeway to introduce any visitors, often people observing its deliberations from the gallery above the Senate chamber. Then the Senators consider legislation. They begin with unfinished business from the previous session, then consider legislation and special orders with accompanying reports from committees. At the discretion of the presiding officer, the Senate may adjourn at any time, unless a majority of members present object to adjournment.

Lobbying is common in Annapolis; there are more than 700 lobbyists registered with the state. While lobbyists may spend freely on advocacy, they are limited in gifts to legislators and in their ability to contribute to campaigns. Ethics issues related to lobbyists and other matters are handled by the Joint Committee on Legislative Ethics, a twelve-member committee that includes six senators. Members of the Senate may turn to either this committee or an ethics counsel to help them resolve questions of potential ethical conflict. Members are encouraged to avoid conflicts of interest, and are required to submit public financial disclosures to the state. In addition to employment prohibitions laid out in the state constitution, members are barred from advocating for any paying client before any part of the state government.

== See also ==
- Maryland General Assembly
- Maryland House of Delegates
- Maryland state senate delegations
- List of Maryland General Assembly sessions
- Government of Maryland
- Maryland's congressional delegations
