= Joanne C. Benson =

American politician (born 1941)

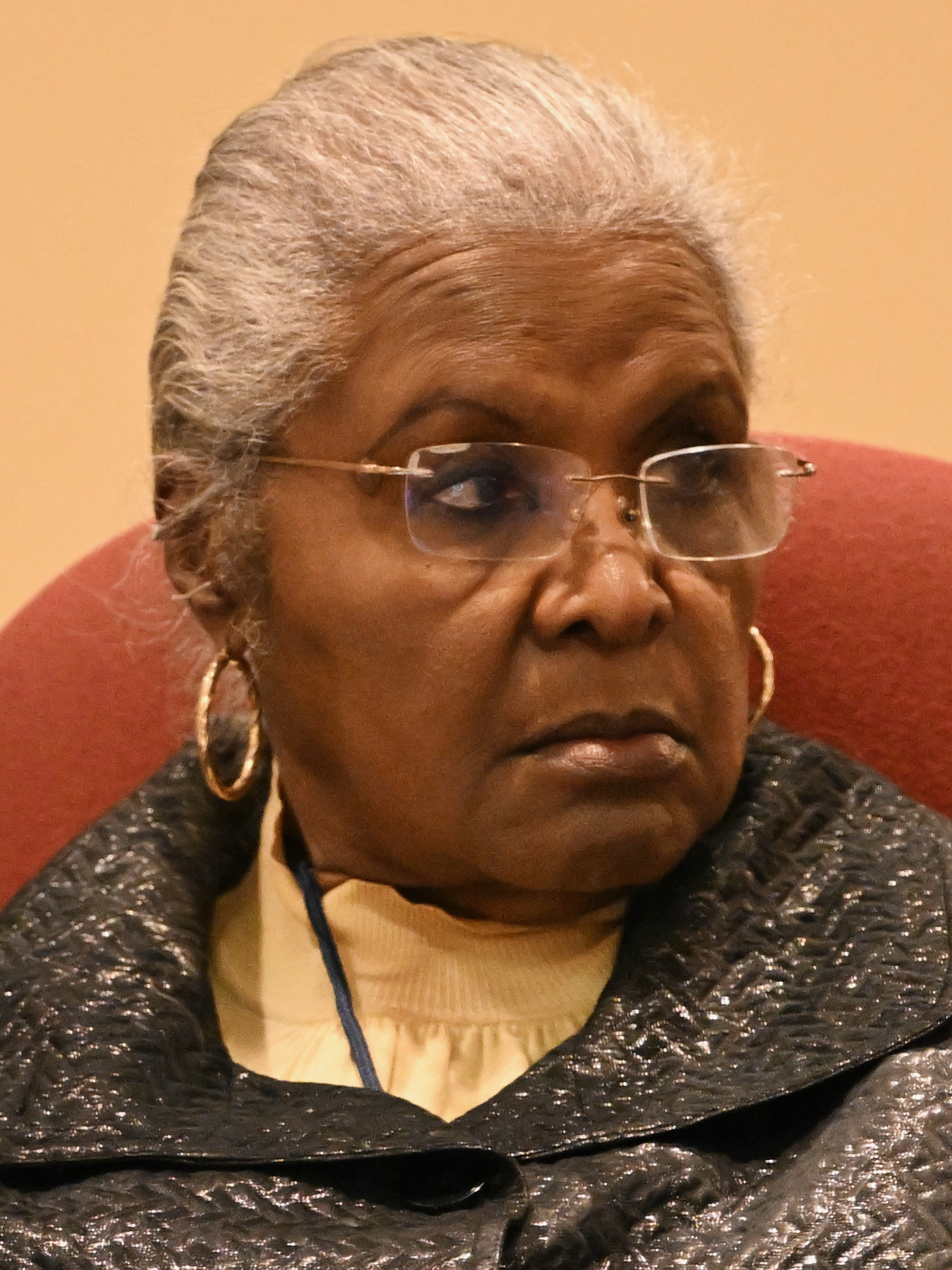
- Benson in 2025

Member of the Maryland Senate from the 24th district
- Incumbent
- Assumed office January 12, 2011
- Preceded by: Nathaniel Exum

Member of the Maryland House of Delegates from the 24th district
- In office January 9, 1991 – January 12, 2011
- Preceded by: Francis J. Santangelo Sr.
- Succeeded by: Tiffany T. Alston

Personal details
- Born: March 11, 1941 (age 85) Roanoke, Virginia, U.S.
- Party: Democratic
- Education: Bowie State College (BS); The Catholic University of America (MA)
- Occupation: Educator

Joanne Claybon Benson (born March 11, 1941) is an American politician who represents District 24 in the Maryland State Senate. She formerly represented District 24 in the Maryland House of Delegates.

== Early life and education ==
Benson was born on March 11, 1941, in Roanoke, Virginia. She attended South Hagerstown High School and then graduated from Bowie State College with a Bachelor of Science in education in 1961. She later attended The Catholic University of America where she earned her Master of Arts in curriculum instruction in 1972.

== In the legislature ==
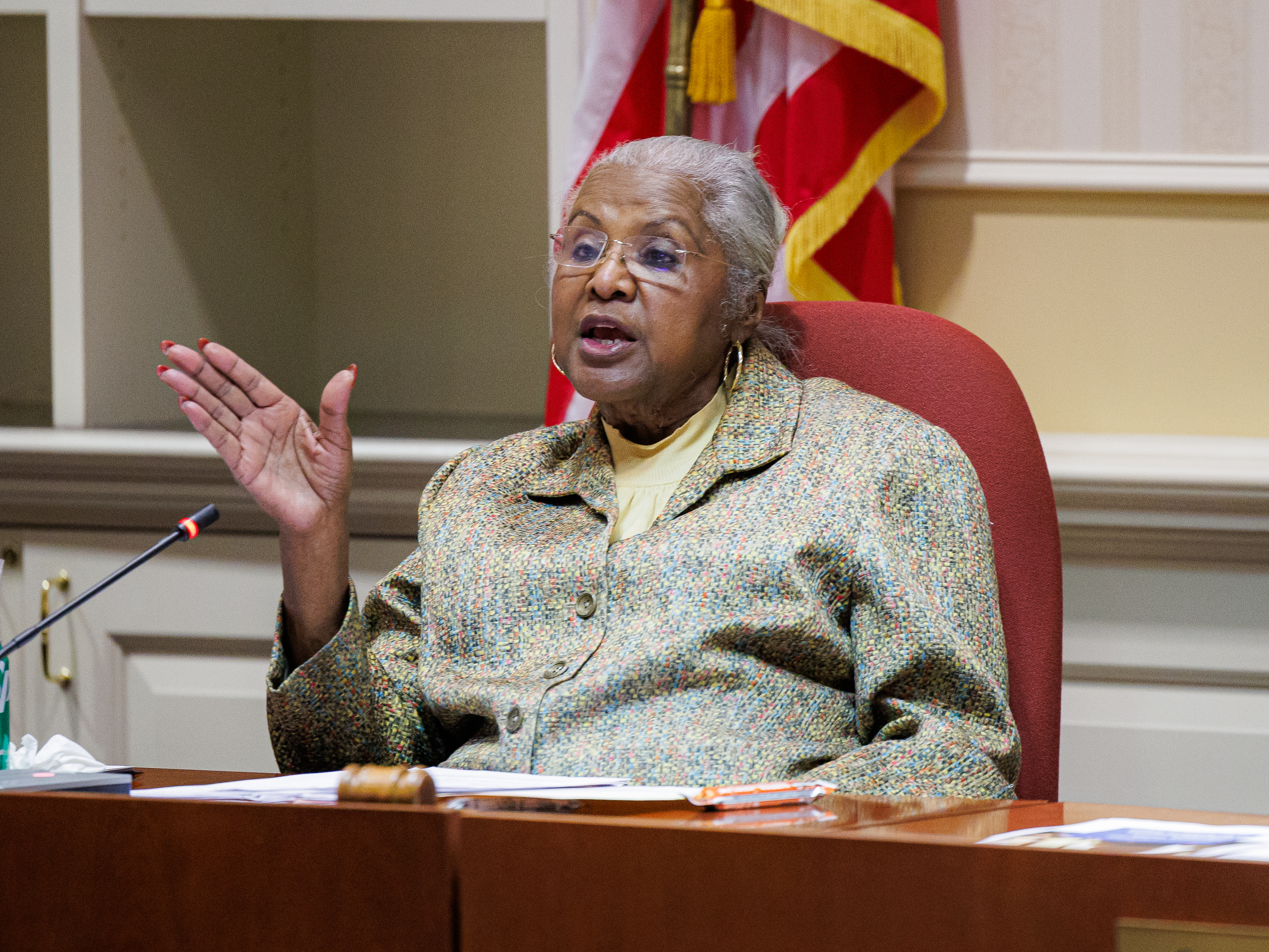
Benson in the Senate Budget and Taxation Committee, 2025

Benson was a member of House of Delegates from 1991 to 2011. She served on the House Health and Government Operations Committee and its health occupations subcommittee, long-term care subcommittee, and its minority health disparities subcommittee. She was also a member and former chair of the Legislative Black Caucus of Maryland.

In 2010, she defeated incumbent state senator Nathaniel Exum and was sworn into the Maryland Senate in January 2011. In 2020, she was selected to be a deputy majority leader of the Maryland Senate. She was the chair of the Rules Committee from 2019 to 2023, afterwards serving as the Senate majority whip from 2023 to 2027.

In 2019, Benson worked with Colorado Governor John Hickenlooper to commute the sentence of Curtis Brooks, who had been sentenced as a juvenile to life in prison without parole.

Benson did not run for re-election in 2026, after missing much of the 2026 legislative session. In an interview with NBC Washington, Benson blamed her absence on health challenges, including a surgery that required extended recovery time, but said that she hoped to be back before the General Assembly adjourned sine die. She declined to step down so that someone else could serve in her place for the remainder of the legislative session, expressing concerns that the Prince George's County Democratic Central Committee would appoint one of the candidates running in the Democratic primary election to succeed her. Benson returned to the Maryland General Assembly on March 30, 2026, for the final two weeks of the 90 day session.

== Political positions ==
=== Gun control ===
During the 2019 legislative session, Benson introduced legislation to ban the manufacture or sale of privately made firearms.

=== Marijuana ===
In 2022, Benson voted against legislation to legalize recreational marijuana in Maryland. She also voted against a bill to place a referendum legalizing recreational marijuana on the 2022 ballot.

=== Minimum wage ===
In 2019, Benson voted in favor of legislation to raise the state's minimum wage to $15 an hour, but expressed disappointment with the date's effective date of 2025.

=== Redistricting ===
In February 2026, Benson said she supported pursuing mid-decade redistricting in Maryland and supported holding a vote on a bill that would redraw Maryland's congressional districts to improve the Democratic Party's chances of winning the 1st congressional district, the only congressional district held by Republicans in the state.

=== Social issues ===
In 1991, Benson voted in favor of legislation to protect the right to abortion in Maryland.

Benson opposed the Religious Freedom and Civil Marriage Protection Act, a bill introduced in 2011 to legalize same-sex marriage in Maryland, saying that she did not view gay marriage as a civil rights issue. Although she was absent for the vote on the bill, she said she would have voted against it. In 2012, she voted against the Civil Marriage Protection Act.

In 2022, Benson supported legislation to provide paid family leave to all Maryland workers, saying that paid family leave "should not be viewed as a privilege, but as something that is humane and just".

=== Taxes ===
In 2013, Benson voted in favor of legislation to raise fuel taxes in Maryland.

=== Transportation ===
During the 2021 legislative session, Benson introduced legislation to hold the Maryland Department of Transportation to promises it made for the widening of Capital Beltway and Interstate 270 and modernizing the American Legion Memorial Bridge. The bill passed the House of Delegates by a vote of 101–35 in March, but did not receive a vote in the Senate.

== Personal life ==
Benson is a congregant at the First Baptist Church of Glenarden.

In April 2026, the Maryland Senate renamed the Maryland Phone-Free Schools Act in Benson's honor, citing her work on education issues.

== Electoral history ==
Maryland House of Delegates District 24 Election, 1990
Party	Candidate	Votes	%
Democratic	Sylvania W. Woods Jr.	10,954	32
Democratic	Joanne C. Benson	10,954	32
Democratic	Nathaniel Exum	10,954	32
Republican	Edward J. Turner	2,307	7

Maryland House of Delegates District 24 Election, 1994
Party	Candidate	Votes	%
Democratic	Joanne C. Benson	15,086	34
Democratic	Nathaniel Exum	15,057	34
Democratic	Carolyn J. B. Howard	14,708	33

Maryland House of Delegates District 24 Election, 1998
Party	Candidate	Votes	%
Democratic	Joanne C. Benson	20,137	34
Democratic	Carolyn J. B. Howard	20,123	34
Democratic	Darren Swain	19,396	33

Maryland House of Delegates District 24 Election, 2002
Party	Candidate	Votes	%
Democratic	Joanne C. Benson	18,125	34.3
Democratic	Michael L. Vaughn	17,333	32.8
Democratic	Carolyn J. B. Howard	17,309	32.7
Write-In		71	0.1
Democratic	Eugene F. Kennedy (Write-In)	36	0.1

Maryland House of Delegates District 24 Election, 2006
Party	Candidate	Votes	%
Democratic	Joanne C. Benson	19,081	33.5
Democratic	Carolyn J. B. Howard	19,007	33.4
Democratic	Michael L. Vaughn	18,806	33.0
Write-In		66	0.1

Maryland Senate District 24 Democratic Primary Election, 2010
Party	Candidate	Votes	%
Democratic	Joanne C. Benson	6,178	53.8
Democratic	Nathaniel Exum	5,311	46.2

Maryland Senate District 24 Election, 2010
Party	Candidate	Votes	%
Democratic	Joanne C. Benson	27,222	99.7
Write-In		92	0.3

Maryland Senate District 24 Election, 2014
Party	Candidate	Votes	%
Democratic	Joanne C. Benson	29,692	99.2
Write-In		238	0.8

Maryland Senate District 24 Election, 2018
Party	Candidate	Votes	%
Democratic	Joanne C. Benson	44,568	99.2
Write-In		338	0.8
