= Christian "Cash" Harrison =

American professional track and field athlete

Christian Harrison
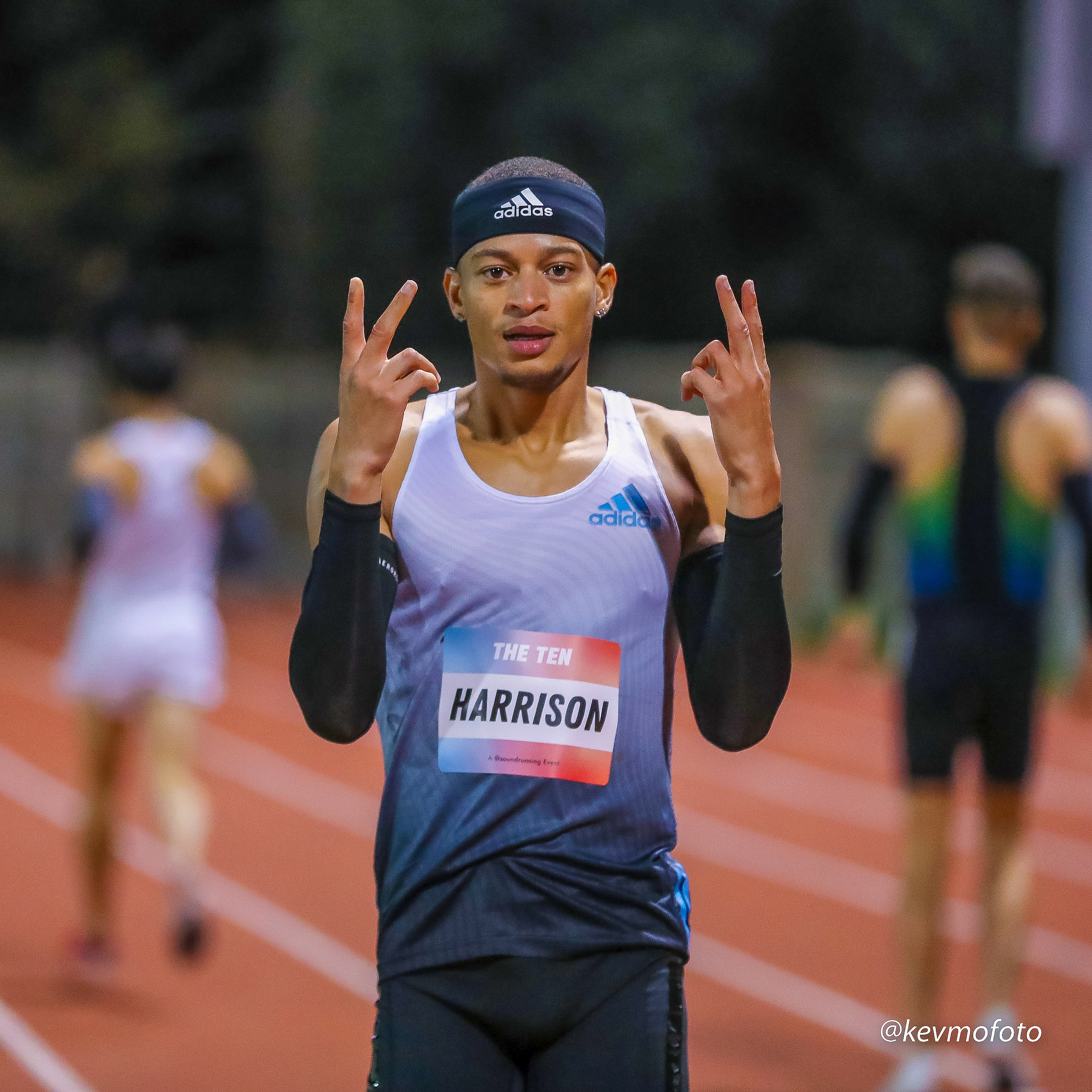
- Christian Harrison in Orange County, CA in 2023

Personal information
- Nickname: Cash
- Born: 27 September 1993 (age 32) Glenarden, Maryland, U.S.
- Education: University of Georgia
- Height: 6 ft 0 in (183 cm)
- Weight: 150 lb (68 kg)

Sport
- Sport: Track and field
- Event: 800 metres
- Club: Golden Coast Track Club
- Team: Adidas
- Turned pro: 2016
- Coached by: Terrence Mahon

Christian "Cash" Harrison (born September 27, 1993) is an American professional track and field athlete who specializes as a mid-distance runner. He competed in the 800 meters at the 2016 U.S. Olympic Trials and is an 13x USATF Championship qualifier.

== Early life ==
Born and raised in Glenarden, Maryland, a city within Prince George’s County, he graduated from C.H. Flowers High School in Springdale, Maryland where he holds the school records for 1600 meters at 4:25.25 and 5k Cross Country at 16:53.

== College ==
Harrison attended North Carolina A&T State University where he ran a personal best of 1:49.74 at the 2013 NC A&T Aggie Invitational. He also holds the NC A&T school record for the 1000m at 2:28.46. In 2014 he transferred to the University of Georgia where he was a 2016 NCAA All-American and ran his collegiate best of 1:46.69 at the 2016 SEC Outdoor Championships. His 800m times rank 3rd in school history at North Carolina A&T and 3rd in school history at University of Georgia.

== Professional track and field career ==
Upon graduating from UGA in 2016, he joined the Boston Athletic Association (BAA) racing team, where he was coached by Terrence Mahon, and was eventually elevated to the BAA High Performance Team. He trained alongside Chris O'Hare, Lynsey Sharp, Sarah Pagano, Elaina Tabb and other elite runners. In the winter of 2019, Harrison relocated to San Diego, California to join the Golden Coast Track Club (formerly known as Mission Athletic Club) continuing to be coached by Mahon, training alongside Nikki Hiltz, Mac Fleet, Brooke Feldmeier and other elite runners. Harrison has qualified for 5 USATF Indoor Championships and 8 USATF Outdoor Championships, including the 2016 U.S. Olympic Team Trials. His indoor PB of 1:46.20 is the 30th fastest time in U.S. history.

In March of 2019, Harrison, along with Eric Sowinski and Harun Abda, paced Yomif Kejelcha to the Indoor Mile World Record in Boston, Massachusetts. In April 2025 Harrison paced Emmanuel Wanyonyi in a road mile world record attempt at the 2025 Adidas Adizero Road to Records. Wanyoni would fall short of the world record, but did complete the mile in 3:52.45 which is the second fastest road mile in world history.

== Personal life ==
Christian is the son of Andrea Harrison, an elected official who serves in the Maryland House of Delegates, representing district 24 in Prince George's County, Maryland.

In 2017, Harrison started his own non-profit organization Beat The Day, Inc. where he gives annual scholarships to athletes in his hometown of Glenarden, MD, and annual donations to the Boys and Girls Club, of which he is an alumnus.

== Personal bests ==
	Event	Time	Location	Date
Outdoor	400 meters	47.61	Athens, GA	30 April 2016
Outdoor	800 meters	1:45.67	Pfungstadt, Germany	20 August 2025
Outdoor	Mile	4:03.18	West Chester, PA	07 August 2025
Indoor	600 meters	1:18.75	Staten Island, NY	18 February 2017
Indoor	800 meters	1:46.20	Clemson, SC	25 January 2025
Indoor	1000 meters	2:22:30	Iowa City, IA	21 January 2023
