= Senator Trotter (disambiguation) =

James F. Trotter (1802–1866) was a U.S. Senator from Mississippi from 1802 to 1866. Senator Trotter may also refer to:

- Decatur Trotter (1932–2004), Maryland State Senate
- Donne Trotter (born 1950), Illinois State Senate
