= Legislative Black Caucus of Maryland =

American political organization

- Formation: 1970
- Type: Political organization
- Legal status: 501(c)(4)
- Purpose: public policies
- Headquarters: Lowe House Office Building
- Location: Annapolis, Maryland, U.S.
- Region served: Maryland, U.S.
- Members: 66 members, 2023–26 Maryland Assembly: 16 Senators; 50 Delegates
- Official language: English
- Chairman: N. Scott Phillips
- Parent organization: National Black Caucus of State Legislators
- Affiliations: Maryland Legislative Black Caucus Foundation
- Staff: 1
- Volunteers: 10
- Website: https://www.marylandblackcaucus.com/

The Legislative Black Caucus of Maryland, Inc. (also known as The Maryland Legislative Black Caucus) is an American political organization composed of African Americans elected to the Maryland General Assembly. Incorporated in 1970, the Caucus membership has grown from 17 to 64 and is the largest state legislative black caucus in the country.

== Founding ==
The Caucus was incorporated in 1970 by Lena King Lee, then a member of the Maryland House of Delegates.

== Role ==
By drafting and sponsoring legislation to address constituent needs and by examining all bills that affect the Black populace, the Caucus acts as a legislative body on behalf of all African Americans in Maryland. Currently, of Maryland's 24 sub-divisions, only Baltimore City, Prince Georges, Baltimore, Montgomery, Howard and Charles, Wicomico Counties have elected members to the Maryland Black Caucus. So additionally the Caucus presents a Black perspective from the entire state to the Legislature and advocates public policies that promote Black social, cultural and economic progress, statewide. In addition, the Caucus serves as a research study group to generate pertinent data in support of appropriate public policies.

== Current membership ==
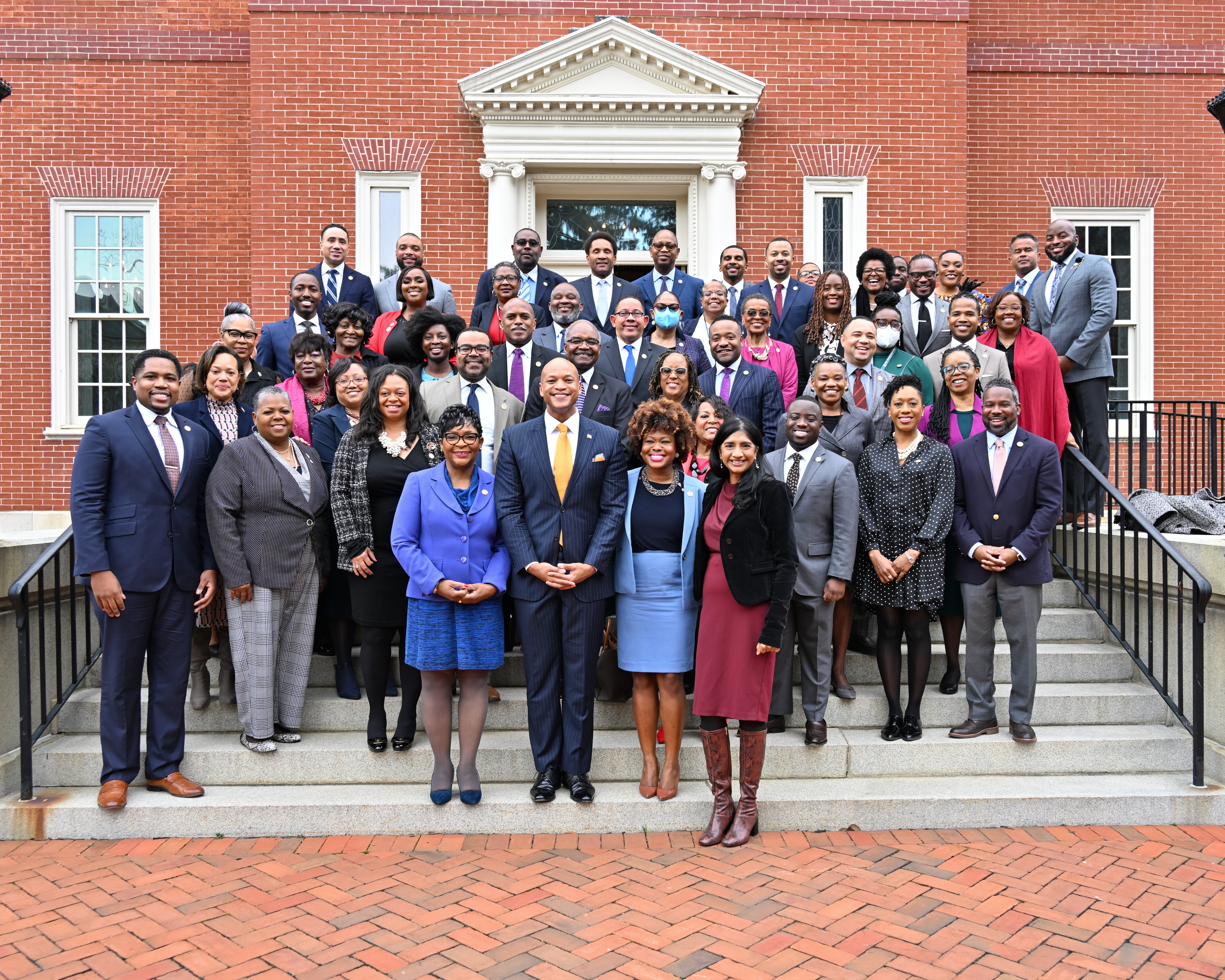
Members of the 2023 Maryland Legislative Black Caucus at the Maryland Statehouse

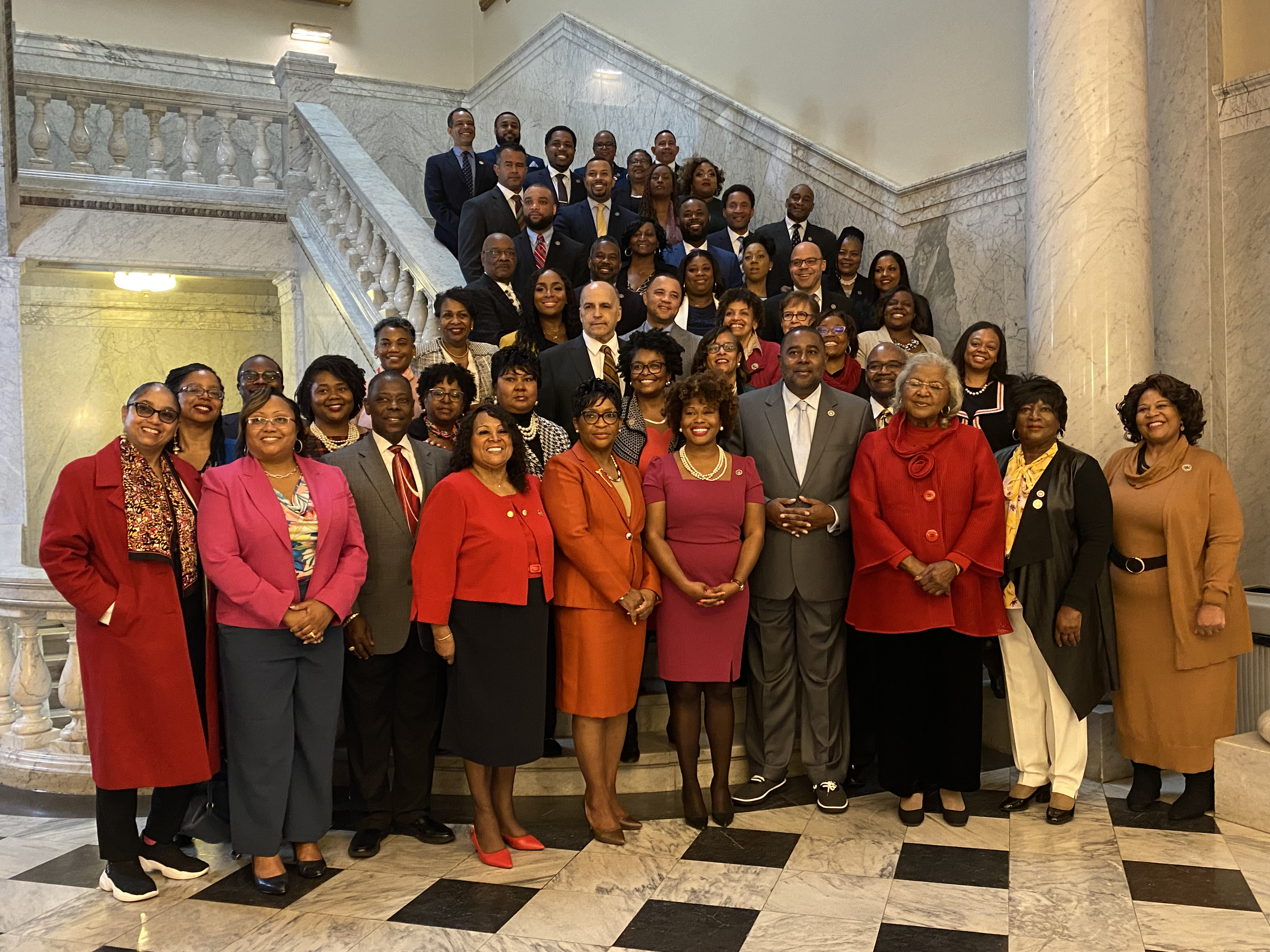
Members of the 2022 Maryland Legislative Black Caucus in the Maryland Statehouse

=== Officers ===
District	Officers	Position
10	Delegate N. Scott Phillips	Chair
40	Senator Shaneka Henson	1st Vice-chair
25	Delegate Karen Toles	2nd Vice-chair
40	Delegate Marlon Amprey	Treasurer
26	Delegate Jamila Woods	Secretary
43	Senator Mary L. Washington	Financial Secretary
24	Senator Joanne C. Benson	Chaplain
45	Delegate Stephanie M. Smith	Parliamentarian
43	Senator Mary L. Washington	Historian

=== Senators ===
District	County(s) represented	Member Senator	Party	First elected	Committee
8	Baltimore County	Carl W. Jackson	Democratic	2025	Finance
10	Baltimore County	Benjamin Brooks	Democratic	2022	Education, Energy, and the Environment
20	Montgomery	Will Smith	Democratic	2016	Judicial Proceedings (Chair)
22	Prince George's	Alonzo T. Washington	Democratic	2023	Finance
23	Prince George's	Ron Watson	Democratic	2021	Education, Energy, and the Environment
24	Prince George's	Joanne C. Benson	Democratic	2011	Budget and Taxation
25	Prince George's	Nick Charles	Democratic	2023	Judicial Proceedings
26	Prince George's	C. Anthony Muse	Democratic	2022	Judicial Proceedings
27	Calvert, Charles, and Prince George's	Kevin Harris	Democratic	2025	Education, Energy, and the Environment
28	Charles	Arthur Ellis	Democratic	2018	Finance
30	Anne Arundel	Shaneka Henson	Democratic	2025	Judicial Proceedings
40	Baltimore	Antonio Hayes	Democratic	2018	Finance
43	Baltimore City and County	Mary L. Washington	Democratic	2018	Education, Energy, and the Environment
44	Baltimore County	Charles E. Sydnor III	Democratic	2020	Judicial Proceedings
45	Baltimore City	Cory McCray	Democratic	2018	Budget and Taxation
47	Prince George's	Malcolm L. Augustine	Democratic	2018	Education, Energy, and the Environment (President Pro Tem)

=== Delegates ===
District	County represented	Member Delegate	Party	First elected	Committee
8	Baltimore County	Kim Ross	Democratic	2025	Health
10	Baltimore County	Adrienne A. Jones	Democratic	1997	Appropriations
10	Baltimore County	N. Scott Phillips	Democratic	2022	Judiciary
10	Baltimore County	Jennifer White Holland	Democratic	2022	Health
11A	Baltimore County	Cheryl Pasteur	Democratic	2022	Ways & Means
12A	Howard	Terri L. Hill	Democratic	2014	Health
12B	Anne Arundel	Gary Simmons	Democratic	2022	Judiciary
14	Montgomery	Pamela E. Queen	Democratic	2016	Economic Matters
14	Montgomery	Bernice Mireku-North	Democratic	2023	Ways & Means
19	Montgomery	Charlotte Crutchfield	Democratic	2018	Government, Labor, & Elections
20	Montgomery	Jheanelle Wilkins	Democratic	2017	Ways & Means (Chair)
21	Anne Arundel and Prince George's	Joseline Peña-Melnyk	Democratic	2006	House Speaker
22	Prince George's	Nicole A. Williams	Democratic	2019	Judiciary
22	Prince George's	Ashanti Martinez	Democratic	2023	Health
23	Prince George's	Marvin E. Holmes Jr.	Democratic	2002	Environment & Transportation
23	Prince George's	Adrian Boafo	Democratic	2022	Economic Matters
23	Prince George's	Kym Taylor	Democratic	2022	Judiciary
24	Prince George's	Tiffany T. Alston	Democratic	2022	Health
24	Prince George's	Andrea Harrison	Democratic	2018	Appropriations
24	Prince George's	Derrick Coley	Democratic	2026	Ways & Means
25	Prince George's	Kent Roberson	Democratic	2023	Ways & Means
25	Prince George's	Denise Roberts	Democratic	2024	Economic Matters
25	Prince George's	Karen Toles	Democratic	2022	Appropriations
26	Prince George's	Jamila Woods	Democratic	2022	Judiciary
26	Prince George's	Veronica L. Turner	Democratic	2018	Economic Matters
27A	Prince George's and Charles	Darrell Odom	Democratic	2026	Environment & Transportation
27B	Calvert and Prince George's	Jeffrie Long Jr.	Democratic	2023	Environment & Transportation
28	Charles	C. T. Wilson	Democratic	2010	Government, Labor, & Elections
28	Charles	Edith J. Patterson	Democratic	2014	Ways & Means
28	Charles	Debra Davis	Democratic	2018	Judiciary (Vice Chair)
32	Anne Arundel	J. Sandy Bartlett	Democratic	2018	Judiciary (Chair)
32	Anne Arundel	Mike Rogers	Democratic	2018	Economic Matters
34A	Anne Arundel	Andre Johnson Jr.	Democratic	2022	Economic Matters
37A	Dorchester and Wicomico	Sheree Sample-Hughes	Democratic	2014	Government, Labor, & Elections
39	Montgomery	Gabriel Acevero	Democratic	2018	Appropriations
39	Montgomery	W. Gregory Wims	Democratic	2023	Ways & Means
40	Baltimore City	Frank M. Conaway Jr.	Democratic	2006	Judiciary
40	Baltimore City	Melissa Wells	Democratic	2018	Government, Labor, & Elections (Chair)
40	Baltimore City	Marlon Amprey	Democratic	2021	Economic Matters
41	Baltimore City	Malcolm Ruff	Democratic	2023	Appropriations
41	Baltimore City	Sean Stinnett	Democratic	2025	Appropriations
43A	Baltimore City	Regina T. Boyce	Democratic	2018	Environment & Transportation
44B	Baltimore County	Aletheia McCaskill	Democratic	2022	Appropriations
45	Baltimore City	Caylin Young	Democratic	2022	Ways & Means
45	Baltimore City	Jackie Addison	Democratic	2022	Ways & Means
45	Baltimore City	Stephanie M. Smith	Democratic	2018	Appropriations
46	Baltimore City	Robbyn Lewis	Democratic	2017	Environment & Transportation
47A	Prince George's	Diana M. Fennell	Democratic	2015	Economic Matters
47A	Prince George's	Julian Ivey	Democratic	2019	Appropriations
47B	Prince George's	Deni Taveras	Democratic	2023	Health

== History ==
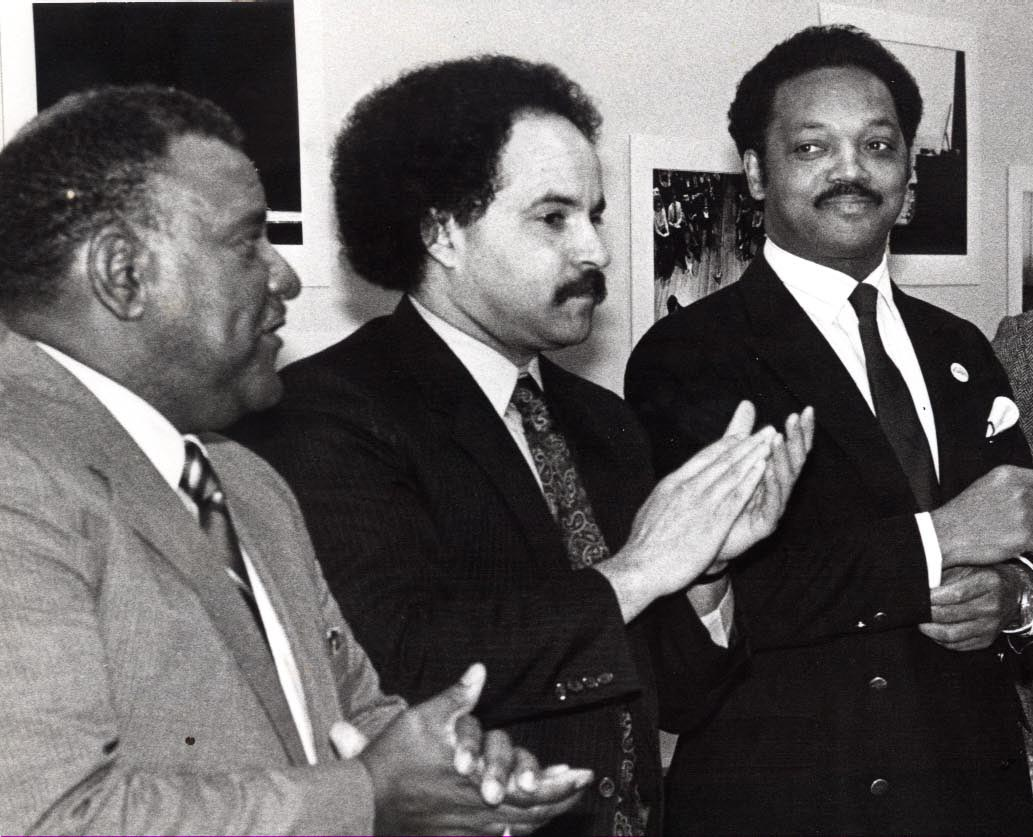
Former chairmen Trotter and Anderson with Rev. Jesse Jackson during a Caucus meeting in Annapolis, Maryland (1988)

The Legislative Black Caucus of Maryland was formed in 1970 as the Maryland Legislative Black Caucus. The Caucus has increased from it original membership of 17 to its present membership of 64. From its inception to the 1990s, only Prince George's County and Baltimore City had sent members to the Caucus. The present membership of the Legislative Black Caucus now includes elected representatives from Baltimore, Montgomery, and Charles counties as well as the Eastern Shore of Maryland.

=== Former chairs ===
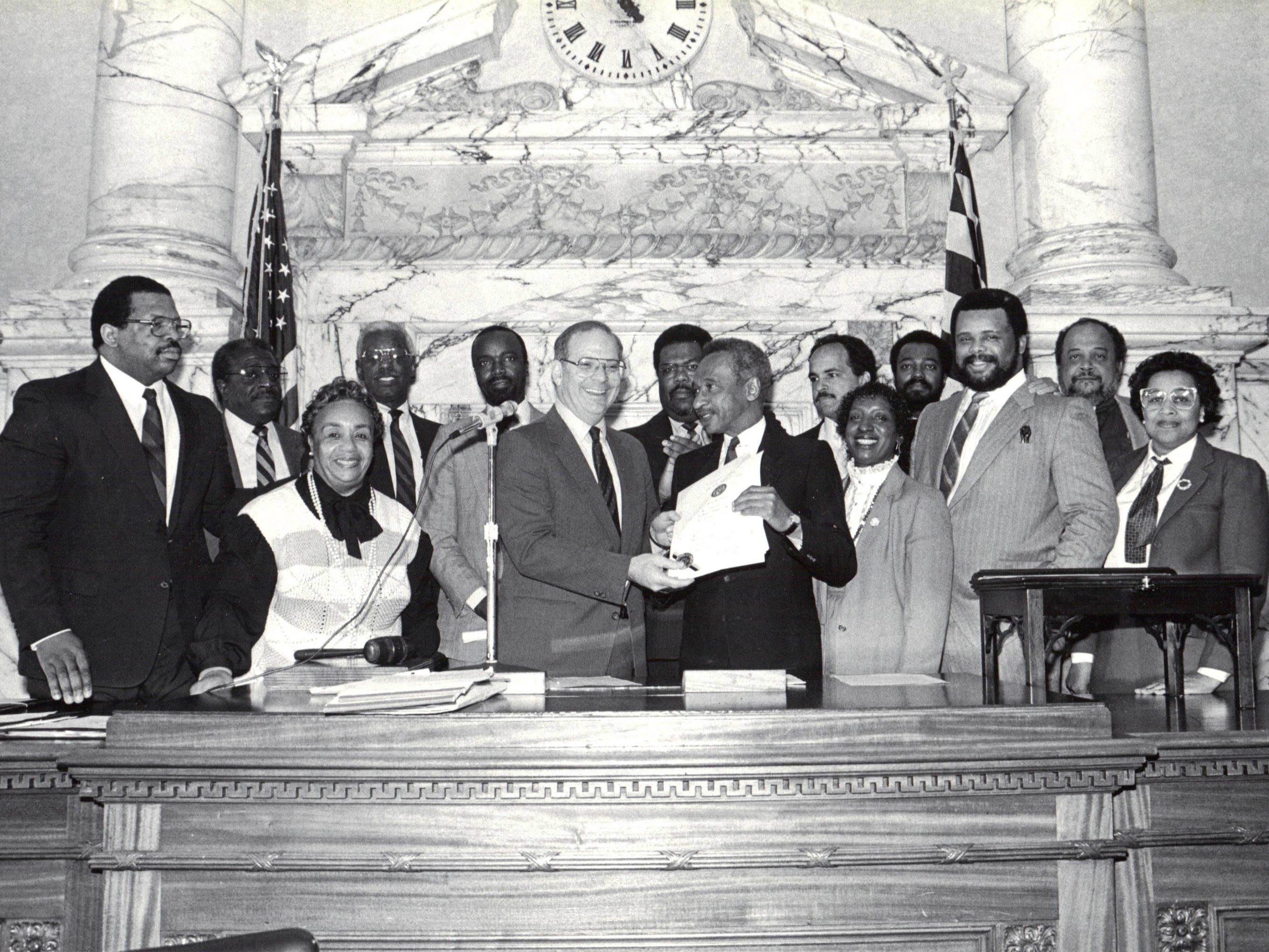
Parren Mitchell receiving a Maryland House of Delegates citation from the Legislative Black Caucus of Maryland and House Speaker Ben Cardin on the occasion of his retirement. (from l-r: Delegates Elijah Cummings, Clarence Davis, Hattie Harrison, John Douglass, Nathaniel Oaks, Ben Cardin, Pete Rawlings, Parren Mitchell, Curt Anderson, Ruth Kirk, Ralph Hughes, Larry Young, Wendell Phillips, Margaret "Peggy" Murphy

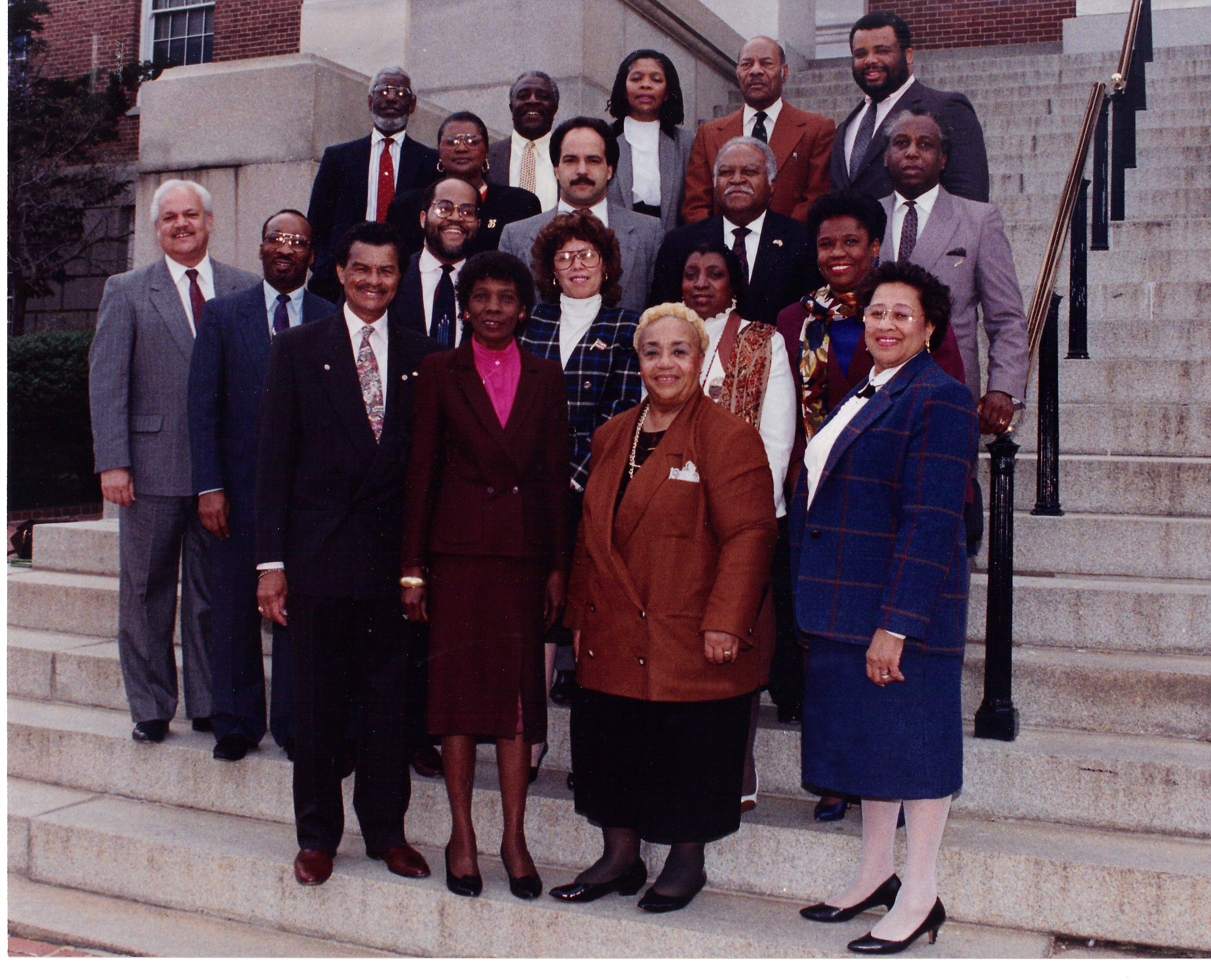
The 1992 Members of Maryland's Legislative Black Caucus: Front row l-r J. Jeffries, C. Jones, H. Harrison, M. Murphy 2nd row: J. Proctor, N. Exum, T. Fulton, B. Tignor, R. Kirk, C. Howard 3rd row: J. Benson, C. Anderson, S. Parham, N. Irby back row: J. Douglass, C. Davis, S. Marriott, C. Blount, L. Young

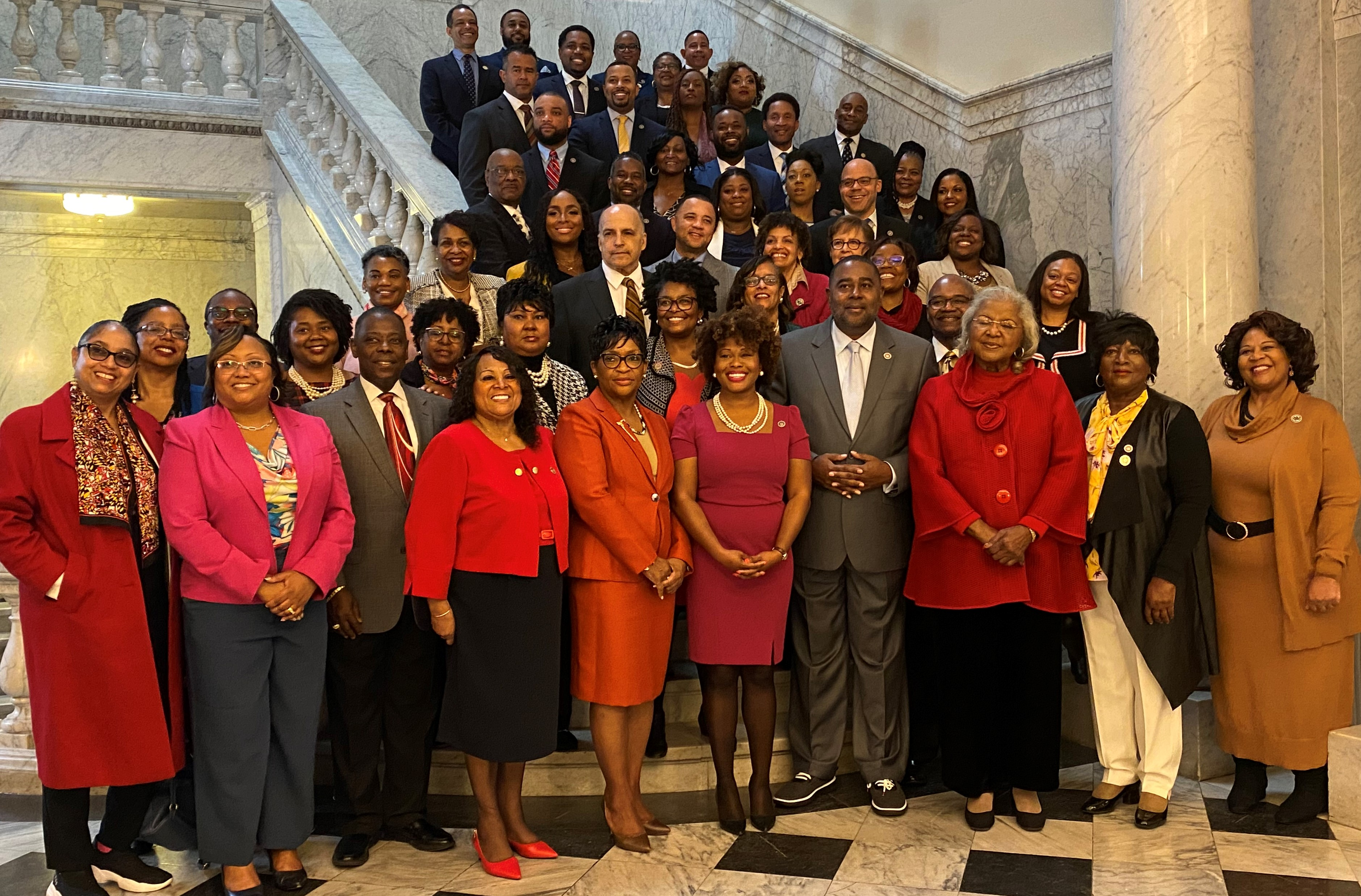
members of the 2022 Maryland Legislative Black Caucus in the Maryland Statehouse

List of Chairpersons of the Legislative Black Caucus of Maryland:

Chamber	Name	Tenure	County
Delegate	Arthur King	1970–1972	Prince George's
Delegate	Lloyal Randolph	1972–1975	Baltimore City
Senator	Robert Douglas	1976–1978	Baltimore City
Delegate	Arthur G. Murphy Sr.	1978	Baltimore City
Senator	Robert Douglas	1978–1980	Baltimore City
Delegate	Frank Conaway Sr.	1981–1982	Baltimore City
Senator	Clarence W. Blount	1982–1984	Baltimore City
Delegate	Elijah Cummings	1984–1985	Baltimore City
Senator	Decatur "Bucky" Trotter	1986–1988	Prince George's
Delegate	Curt Anderson	1988–1990	Baltimore City
Delegate	Christine M. Jones	1991–1992	Prince George's
Delegate	John D. Jefferies	1992–1994	Baltimore City
Delegate	Joanne C. Benson	1995–1996	Prince George's
Senator	Larry Young	1996–1997	Baltimore City
Delegate	Carolyn J. B. Howard	1998–2000	Prince George's
Delegate	Talmadge Branch	2000–2002	Baltimore City
Delegate	Obie Patterson	2002–2004	Prince George's
Delegate	Rudolph C. Cane	2004–2006	Wicomico
Senator	Verna L. Jones	2006–2008	Baltimore City
Delegate	Veronica L. Turner	2008–2010	Prince George's
Senator	Catherine Pugh	2010–2012	Baltimore City
Delegate	Aisha N. Braveboy	2012–2014	Prince George's
Delegate	Barbara A. Robinson	2014–2016	Baltimore City
Delegate	Cheryl Glenn	2016–2018	Baltimore City
Delegate	Darryl Barnes	2018–2022	Prince George's
Delegate	Jheanelle Wilkins	2022–2026	Montgomery

=== 2007 legislation ===
During the 2007 session of the Maryland General Assembly the Legislative Black Caucus of Maryland pushed several bills through both Houses and had them signed into law. One of which was a bill that required state contractors to pay their employees a "living wage." For fiscal year 2008, the living wage is set at $11.30 in Montgomery, Prince George's, Howard, Anne Arundel and Baltimore Counties and Baltimore City. It is set at $8.50 for all other areas of the State. Additionally, the Caucus pushed for SB 488. This bill allows an individual convicted of any crime, with the exception of buying or selling votes, to register to vote if not actually serving a court-ordered sentence of imprisonment, including any term of parole or probation, for a felony conviction. Another Caucus bill, SB 543-2007 Darfur Protection Act-Divestiture from the Republic of Sudan, requires the Board of Trustees of the State Retirement and Pension System to encourage companies hold actively traded accounts in its portfolio that conduct business in Sudan to act responsibly and avoid actions that promote or enable human rights violations in Sudan. Additionally, the Caucus pushed for Senate Joint resolution 6 which requires the state to express regret for the role that Maryland played in instituting and maintaining slavery and for the discrimination that was slavery's legacy. The Legislative Black Caucus of Maryland also supported the creation of state debt for funding towards the Martin Luther King Jr. Memorial in Washington D.C., leading to a $500,000 donation (equivalent to $776,000 in 2025) to the Dr. Martin Luther King, Jr. Memorial Foundation.

=== 2009 legislation ===
During the 2009 session of the Maryland General Assembly, the following Caucus general priorities were passed: SB 186- Correctional Facilities-Released Inmates-Identification Cards Sponsored by Senator Catherine Pugh. This bill will require the Commissioner of Correction to issue an identification card to an inmate before being released from confinement in a State Correctional facility. The identification card must comply with the requirements for secondary identification for the purpose of an identification card issued by the Motor Vehicle Administration.

SB 489- Minority Business Enterprise Certification-Cap on Personal Net Worth Sponsored by Senator Catherine Pugh. This bill requires that the personal net worth cap for eligibility in the State's Minority Business Enterprise program be adjusted annually according to the Consumer Price Index. Personal net worth does not include up to $500,000 of the cash value of any qualified retirement savings plan or individual retirement account. The Maryland Department of Transportation, in consultation with the Attorney General's office and specified legislative committees must evaluate whether the personal net worth cap should be further adjusted, and report its findings to the General Assembly by December 1, 2010.

SB 568-Minority Business Enterprise Program-Directory of Minority Business Enterprise Sponsored by Senator Catherine Pugh. This bill requires the Maryland Department of Transportation to include in its directory of Minority Business Enterprises (MBEs) a list of all MBEs that are ineligible to participate in the State's MBE program because (1) one or more of its owners has a personal net worth that exceeds the statutory cap; or (2) the MBE no longer qualifies as a small business under federal guidelines.

HB 637- Task Force on Prisoner Reentry Sponsored by Delegate Gerron Levi, this emergency bill establishes a Task Force on Prisoner Reentry. The Secretary of Public Safety and Correctional Services, or the Secretary's designee, must chair the task force and provide staff support for the taskforce from the Department. An interim report to the Governor and the General Assembly is required by December 31, 2010 and final report of findings and recommendation is required by December 31, 2011.

During the 2009 session of the Maryland General Assembly, the following Caucus budgetary priorities were passed:

- Bowie State University received the $34 million needed for their new fine and performing arts building;
- Coppin State University received $4.1 million of the $9.4 million needed for their science and technology center;
- Morgan State University received $43.5 million of the $45 million needed for campus-wide renovations, new environment studies and business schools;
- The Minority Outreach and Technical Assistance program funding remained in the budget; and
- The Office of Minority Health received $335,000 out of $1 million set aside for infant mortality programs.
