= Arthur G. Murphy Sr. =

American politician

Delegate 41st District
- In office 1975–1978
- Succeeded by: Margaret "Peggy" Murphy
- Constituency: Baltimore City Member of the House of Delegates

Personal details
- Died: 1978
- Party: Democratic
- Spouse: Margaret "Peggy" Murphy

Arthur G. Murphy Sr. was an American politician who served in the Maryland House of Delegates representing the 41st legislative district, which lies in the central, northwest section of Baltimore City.

== Background ==
Before he entered the legislature, Murphy was a lawyer. He worked as an assistant U.S. attorney starting in 1962. In 1969, then Governor Marvin Mandel, appointed personal legal aide to the Governor where he served as the governor's civil rights adviser. In 1973. Murphy left the governor's office to join the Maryland State Insurance Fund.

== In the Legislature ==
Murphy was first elected to the Maryland House of Delegates in 1974 and was sworn in January, 1975. Murphy also served as the Chairman of the Legislative Black Caucus of Maryland in 1978.
Murphy died on June 10, 1978, from a heart attack. A Maryland Department of Juvenile Services Youth Services Center, in southwest Baltimore, was renamed the Delegate Arthur G. Murphy Sr.Center following his death. Murphy was a longtime champion of education and vocational opportunities for inner city youth.
