= Margaret "Peggy" Murphy =

American politician (1930–2016)

Margaret H. Murphy
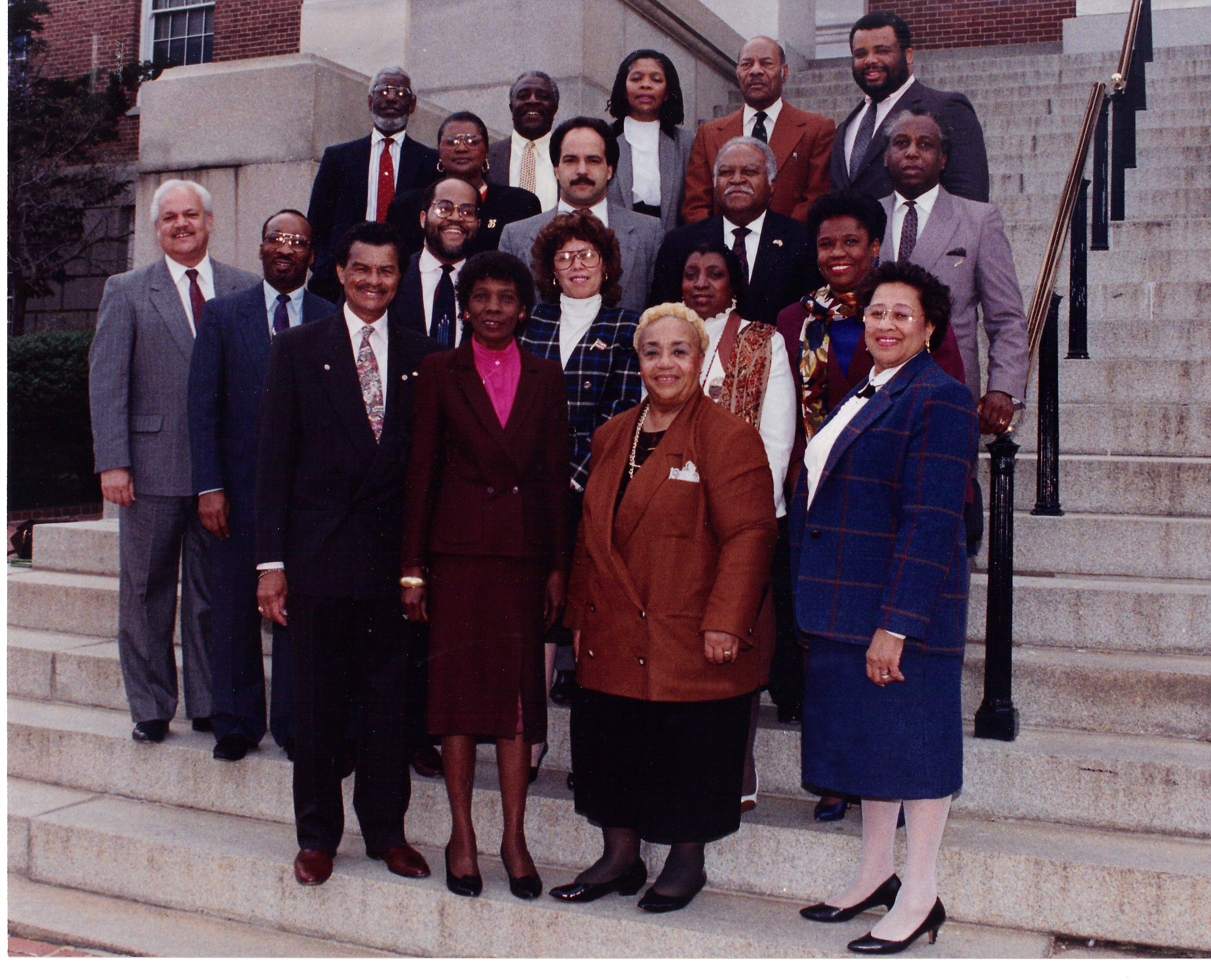
- Murphy (bottom right front) with the 1992 Legislative Black Caucus of Maryland

Delegate 41st District
- In office 1978–1995
- Preceded by: Arthur G. Murphy, Sr.
- Succeeded by: Clay C. Opara
- Constituency: Baltimore City Member of the House of Delegates

Personal details
- Born: February 3, 1930 Baltimore, Maryland, U.S.
- Died: December 13, 2016 (aged 86)
- Party: Democratic
- Spouse: Arthur Murphy

Margaret H. "Peggy" Murphy (February 3, 1930 – December 13, 2016) was an American politician who served in the Maryland House of Delegates and was the first female African-American chairman of the Baltimore City Delegation. Murphy was one of three delegates serving the 41st legislative district, which lies in the central, northwest section of Baltimore City.

== Background ==
Born in Baltimore, Maryland, Murphy attended Baltimore public schools and graduated from Douglass high school. She later graduated from Coppin State College with a B.S. in 1952. She earned an M.A. equivalent in 1977 from Morgan State University. She is the widow of Arthur Murphy, Jr. and has three children. Prior to the Maryland House of Delegates, Murphy was an elementary school teacher and taught in the Baltimore City Public Schools for 30 years. She retired as aneducational associate, Office of English and Library Services for Baltimore City Public Schools. She was also a member of the Public School Teachers Association the National Education Association, the American Red Cross and the NAACP.

== In the Legislature ==
Murphy was appointed to the House of Delegates after the death of her husband Delegate Arthur G. Murphy, Sr. She represented District 41 (D) in Baltimore City from 1978 to 1995. Murphy was a member of the House Environmental Matters Committee and the Joint Committee on Federal Relations. She chaired the Baltimore City Delegation from 1989 to 1992 and also served on the Joint Committee on Administrative, Executive and Legislative Review. She was a member and secretary, of the Legislative Black Caucus of Maryland and a member of the Women Legislators of Maryland.

== Death ==
Murphy died on December 13, 2016, at the age of 86.
