= Terrence Mahon =

American distance runner

Terrence Mahon (born October 5, 1970) is an American distance running coach. Mahon coaches many notable long distance and middle distance runners, including Olympians Deena Kastor, Anna Willard, and Jen Rhines. Mahon also coached Ryan Hall for five years. In 2011 he coached Morgan Uceny to the number one world ranking in the 1500 meters, coached ultra runner Josh Cox to the second fastest 50k time in history, and guided Irishman Alistair Cragg to a new National Record in the 5,000 meters, and in 2012 coached Alistair to European and Irish records in the road 5k at the Carlsbad 5000.

Mahon ran for and graduated from La Habra High School in La Habra, California and walked on as a freshman at Oregon where he earned All-American honors.

Mahon later attended Villanova University as an undergraduate, where he also was an All-American runner. Mahon ran a 2:13:02 in the Chicago Marathon in 1997, and won the U.S. 20 k Championships. He qualified for the Olympic Trials in both the marathon and 10,000 m, but was unable to qualify for the Olympics.

In 1998, Mahon married runner Jen Rhines, who also competed for Villanova. They moved to Mammoth Lakes, California to train, where Mahon later became a coach for Team Running USA, now known as the Mammoth Track Club.

In 2012, Mahon moved to the UK to be the head coach of the distance runners at British Athletics.

After only a year with British Athletics, Mahon returned to the states accepting a position as the head coach of the Boston Athletics Association’s High Performance Team.

In 2015 Mahon was selected by the IAAF to be the women’s middle and long distance coach for Team USA at the 2015 IAAF World Championships.

After 4 years with the BAA, Mahon moved to San Diego, California and started the Golden Coast Track Club (formerly known as the Mission Athletic Club) where he continues to coach some of the best long and middle distance runners including olympians Chris O’Hare, Lynsey Sharp and Andrew Butchart, along with other notable runners like Nikki Hiltz, Mac Fleet, Sarah Pagano, Christian Harrison, and Heidi See .

American marathon record holder and 2004 Olympic Bronze medalist Deena Kastor says this about Mahon:

I owe the longevity of my career to him being so knowledgeable and for reinventing training and therapy to keep me healthy. One of Terrence's greatest strengths is his insatiability to learn, not just about coaching, but life. He is full of so much knowledge and keeps reading great books and visiting with other brilliant people to continue growing.
