= Andrea Harrison =

American politician (born 1963)

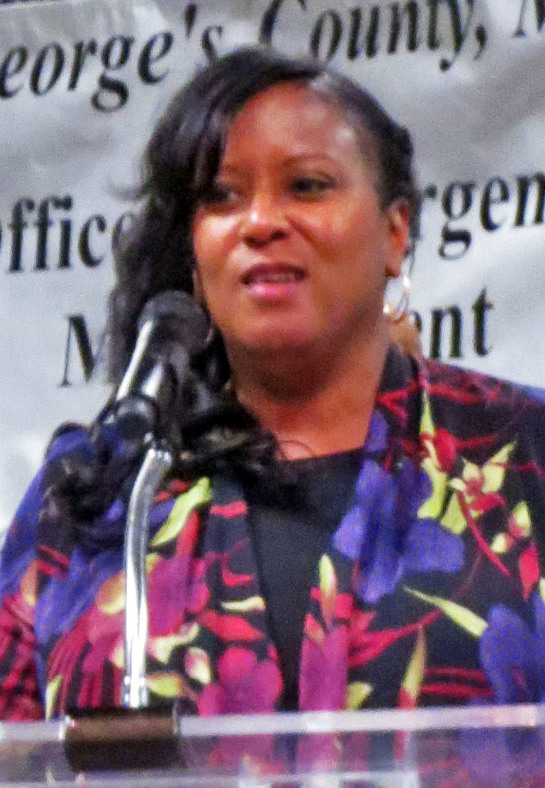
- Harrison in 2013

Member of the Maryland House of Delegates from the 24th district
- Incumbent
- Assumed office January 9, 2019 Serving with Derrick Coley and Faye Martin Howell
- Preceded by: Carolyn J. B. Howard
- Constituency: Prince George's County, Maryland

Member of the Prince George's County Council from the 5th district
- In office May 19, 2008 – December 3, 2018
- Preceded by: David C. Harrington
- Succeeded by: Jolene Ivey

Personal details
- Born: Andrea Carleen Fletcher; September 20, 1963 (age 62) Washington, D.C., U.S.
- Party: Democratic
- Children: 3, including Christian
- Education: Prince George's Community College (AA); Bowie State University (BA)

Andrea Fletcher Harrison (née Fletcher; born September 20, 1963) is an American politician. She currently serves in the Maryland House of Delegates, representing district 24 in Prince George's County, Maryland. She previously served on the Prince George's County Council, representing district 5.

== Early life and education ==
Andrea Carleen Fletcher was born in Washington, D.C., on September 20, 1963, to father James C. Fletcher. She received an Associate in Arts in micro computer systems from Prince George's Community College in 1992. She then received a Bachelor of Arts degree in public policy from Bowie State University in 2002.

== Career ==
Before getting into politics in 2002, Harrison was active with the Ardmore Springdale Civic Association, serving as its president, vice president, and secretary from 1994 to 2007.

After the death of Gwendolyn T. Britt on January 12, 2008, Prince George's County councilmember David C. Harrington was appointed to serve the rest of Britt's term in the Maryland Senate. A special election was held to fill the rest of Harrington's term on the County Council. Harrison won the Democratic primary to fill the seat on April 2, 2008, edging out Edmonston mayor Adam Ortiz by 137 votes. She was sworn in on May 19, 2008, and represented district 5 until December 3, 2019. She was the first woman to represent the seat, which was previously held by her father. In 2012, she was elected to chair the county council.

In 2016, Harrison campaigned in support of a referendum to expand the county council, which led to speculation as to whether she would seek re-election to the council. She declined running for either of the two at-large positions on the council, instead announcing her candidacy for the Maryland House of Delegates in district 24 on December 14, 2017. During the primary, she was endorsed by U.S. Representative Anthony Brown. She won the Democratic primary, coming in third place in a field of 11 candidates with 14.5 percent of the vote.

== In the legislature ==
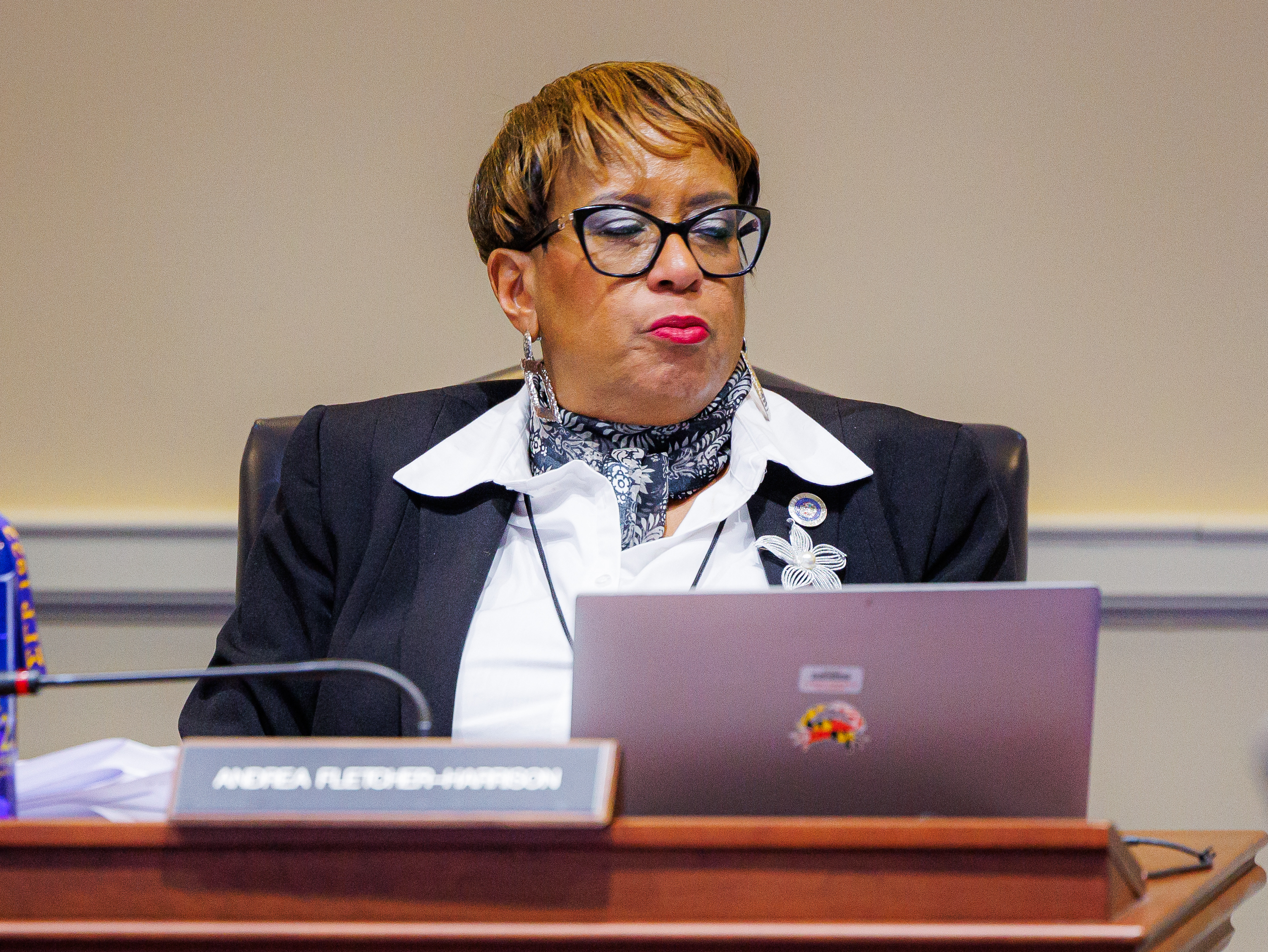
Harrison in the House Economic Matters Committee, 2025

Harrison was sworn into the Maryland House of Delegates on January 9, 2019.

=== Committee assignments ===
- Member, Economic Matters Committee, 2021 (banking, consumer protection & commercial law subcommittee, 2022–present; public utilities subcommittee, 2022–present)
- Member, Study Group on Economic Stability, 2019–present
- Member, Joint Audit and Evaluation Committee, 2020–present
- House Chair, Protocol Committee, 2020–present
- Member, Joint Committee on Fair Practices and State Personnel Oversight, 2022–present
- Member, Environment and Transportation Committee, 2019–2021 (local government & bi-county agencies subcommittee, 2019–2021; motor vehicle & transportation subcommittee, 2019–2021)

=== Other memberships ===
- Member, Legislative Black Caucus of Maryland, 2019–present
- Member, Women Legislators of Maryland, 2019–present

== Political positions ==
=== Minimum wage ===
In 2013, Harrison introduced a bill to raise the minimum wage in Prince George's County to $11.50 an hour by 2016. The bill passed and was signed into law with an effective date of 2017 on December 17, 2013.

=== Social issues ===
In 2011, following a proposal to open a casino at Rosecroft Raceway, Harrison co-sponsored legislation to ban slots in Prince George's County. The county council voted in November to table the bill in a 5–4 vote, with Harrison voting against the table. In 2012, Harrison voted for a resolution voicing the county council's opposition to a bill introduced in the Maryland General Assembly that would allow casinos to be built in Prince George's County.

In 2013, Harrison, alongside county executive Rushern Baker, wrote a letter to Dan Tangherlini to endorse a plan to move the headquarters for the Federal Bureau of Investigation to Greenbelt, Maryland.

== Personal life ==
She is married with three children, one of whom is Christian Harrison, a professional track and field athlete. She lives in Springdale, Maryland.

== Electoral history ==
Prince George's County Councilmanic district 5 Democratic primary election, 2010
Party	Candidate	Votes	%
Democratic	Andrea Harrison	6,539	69.2
Democratic	Nakia T. Ngwala	1,510	16.0
Democratic	Pat Thornton	1,398	14.8

Prince George's County Councilmanic district 5 general election, 2010
Party	Candidate	Votes	%
Democratic	Andrea Harrison	21,268	99.7
	Other write-ins	68	0.3

Prince George's County Councilmanic district 5 Democratic primary election, 2014
Party	Candidate	Votes	%
Democratic	Andrea Harrison	8,109	100

Prince George's County Councilmanic district 5 general election, 2014
Party	Candidate	Votes	%
Democratic	Andrea Harrison	19,968	99.6
	Other write-ins	87	0.4

Maryland House of Delegates district 24 Democratic primary election, 2018
Party	Candidate	Votes	%
Democratic	Erek Barron	9,939	20.3
Democratic	Jazz Lewis	8,513	17.4
Democratic	Andrea Fletcher Harrison	7,111	14.5
Democratic	LaTasha R. Ward	5,685	11.6
Democratic	Maurice Simpson Jr.	3,726	7.6
Democratic	Marnitta L. King	3,481	7.1
Democratic	Michelle R. Wright	3,297	6.7
Democratic	Sia Finoh	2,405	4.9
Democratic	Donjuan "DJ" Williams	1,789	3.7
Democratic	Joyce Starks	1,780	3.6
Democratic	Delaneo Miller	1,166	2.4

Maryland House of Delegates district 24 general election, 2018
Party	Candidate	Votes	%
Democratic	Andrea Fletcher Harrison	38,365	36.7
Democratic	Erek Barron	33,069	31.7
Democratic	Jazz Lewis	32,406	31.0
	Other write-ins	586	0.6
