= Carolyn J. B. Howard =

American politician (1938–2026)

Member of the Maryland House of Delegates from the 24th district
- In office March 3, 1991 – January 9, 2019
- Preceded by: Sylvania W. Woods Jr.
- Succeeded by: Andrea Harrison
- In office January 1988 – January 1990
- Preceded by: Francis J. Santangelo Sr.

Personal details
- Born: December 20, 1938 DeLand, Florida, U.S.
- Died: September 19, 2026 (aged 87)
- Party: Democratic
- Spouse: Earl. J. Howard

Carolyn J. B. Howard (December 20, 1938 – September 19, 2026) was an American politician who previously served the Maryland House of Delegates representing District 24 in Prince George's County. She was the Deputy Speaker Pro Tem of the Maryland House and a former chairman of the Legislative Black Caucus of Maryland.

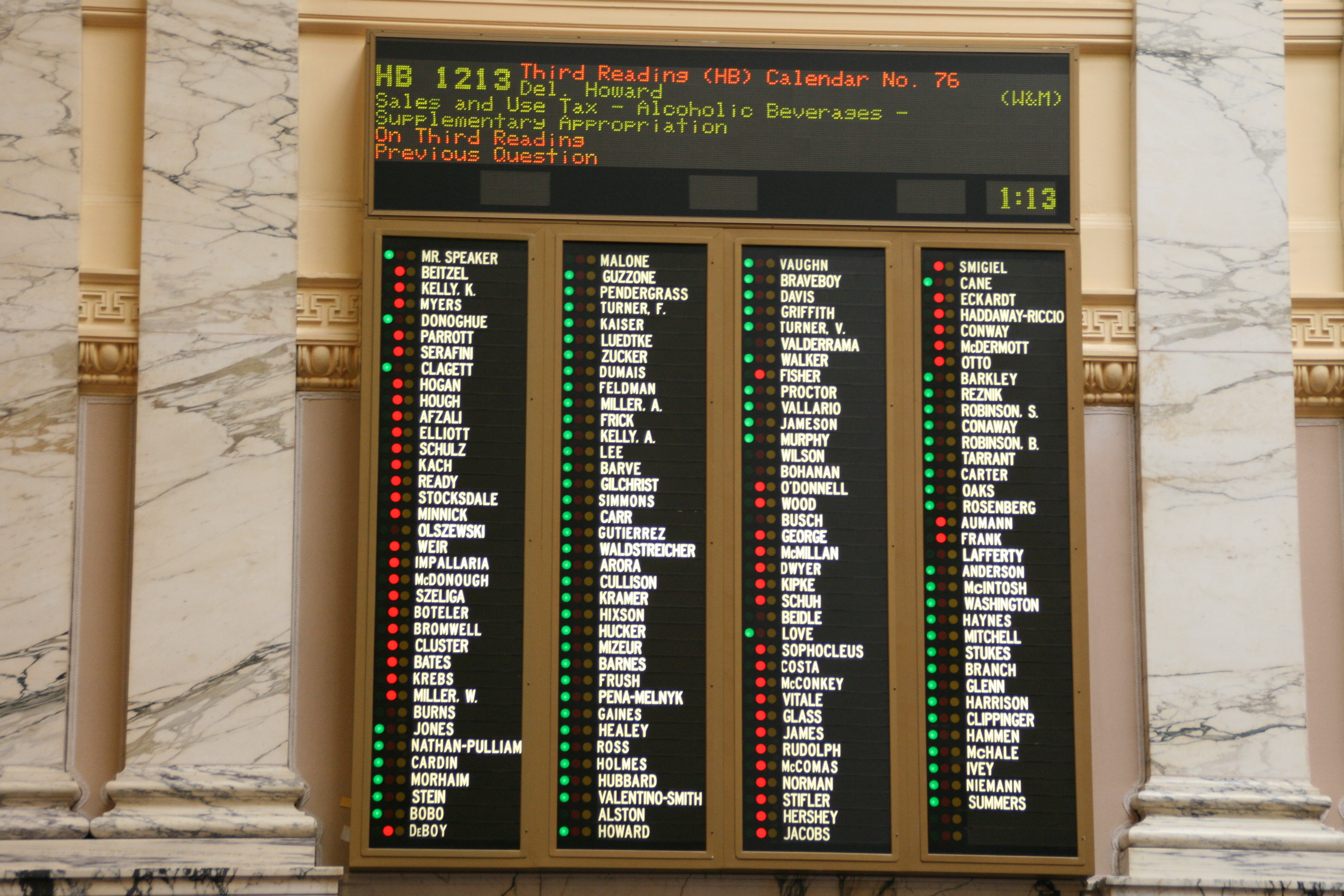
Delegate Howard's funding bill passes the House floor during the 2011 session of the Maryland General Assembly

Howard died on September 19, 2026, at the age of 87.
