= Decatur Trotter =

American politician

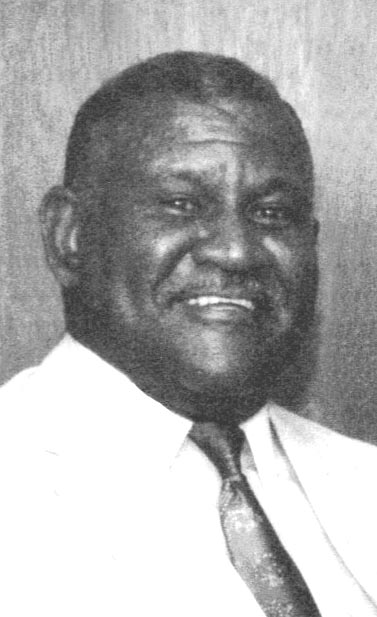

Member of the Maryland Senate from the 24th district
- In office 1983–1999
- Appointed by: Harry Hughes
- Preceded by: Tommie Broadwater
- Succeeded by: Nathaniel Exum

Member of the Maryland House of Delegates from the 25th district
- In office 1975–1979
- Preceded by: District established

Mayor of Glenarden, Maryland
- In office 1970–1974

Personal details
- Born: January 8, 1932 Washington, D.C., U.S.
- Died: May 3, 2004 (aged 72) Baltimore, Maryland, U.S.
- Party: Democratic
- Spouse: LaGreta Trotter
- Children: Denise Williams, Kathi Trotter-Rayner
- Occupation: business consultant

Decatur "Bucky" Trotter (January 8, 1932 – May 3, 2004) was an American politician who was a member of the Maryland State Senate and chairman of the Legislative Black Caucus of Maryland.

== Background ==
Trotter was born in Washington, D.C., on January 8, 1932. He attended Washington, D.C., public schools and then earned his B.S. at Virginia State University, in 1956. He was married with two daughters, five grandchildren, and 6 great-grandchildren.

== In the Legislature ==
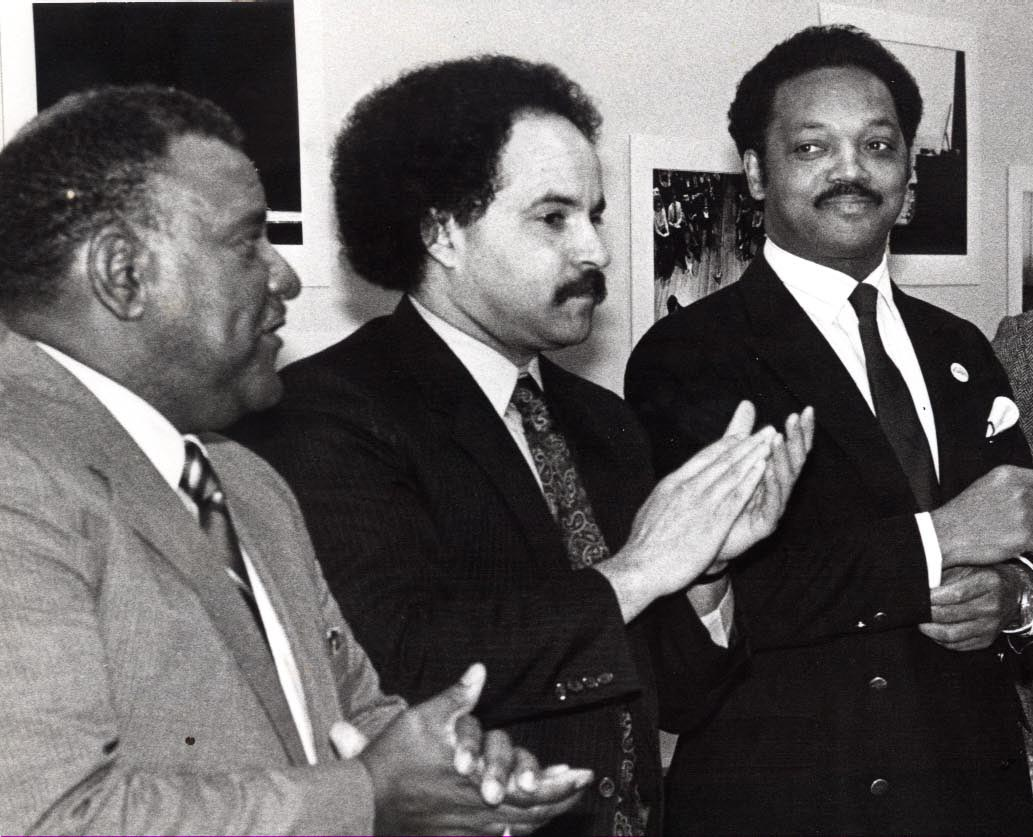
Trotter (left) with Curt Anderson (center) and Jesse Jackson (right) during a Maryland Legislative Black Caucus meeting in Annapolis, Maryland (1988)

Trotter first served in the Maryland House of Delegates, representing Prince George's County from 1975 to 1979. He was a member of the Ways and Means Committee and sponsored Maryland's first minority business enterprise act. Four years later he was elected to the Maryland Senate and served until 1999. In the Senate he was a member of the Budget and Taxation Committee from 1983 to 1992, the Special Joint Committee on Pensions from 1984 to 1999 and Chair of the Legislative Black Caucus from 1986 to 1988. He also served as a member of the Special Joint Committee on the Medical Assistance Program, 1988–92; the Joint Expenditure Study Group on Education and Human Resources, 1991; the Finance Committee, 1993–99; and the Welfare Reform Subcommittee. He chaired the Senate Rules Committee, 1995–99; Legislative Policy Committee, 1995–99; Joint Audit Committee (formerly Joint Committee on Budget and Audit), 1995–99; Joint Committee on Legislative Ethics, 1995–99; Joint Committee on Welfare Reform, 1996–99; Task Force to Study County Property-Tax Setoffs and Related Fiscal Issues, 1997. Senate chair, Joint Committee on Fair Practices, 1997-99.

== Legacy ==
Trotter was a member of the Washington Metropolitan Area Transit Authority Board of Directors since 1999 who served as chairman in 2001. He died on May 3, 2004, in Baltimore, where he was being treated for bone cancer. At the time of his death, he was the chairman of WMATA's Board Planning, Development, and Administration Committee.

WMATA Chief Executive Officer/General Manager Richard A. White called Trotter "a passionate supporter and believer of the Washington Metropolitan Area Transit Authority," as well as "a strong advocate for equality and fairness.an unwearying champion of Metro and a man who lived life to the fullest."
