= Clarence W. Blount =

American politician (1921–2003)

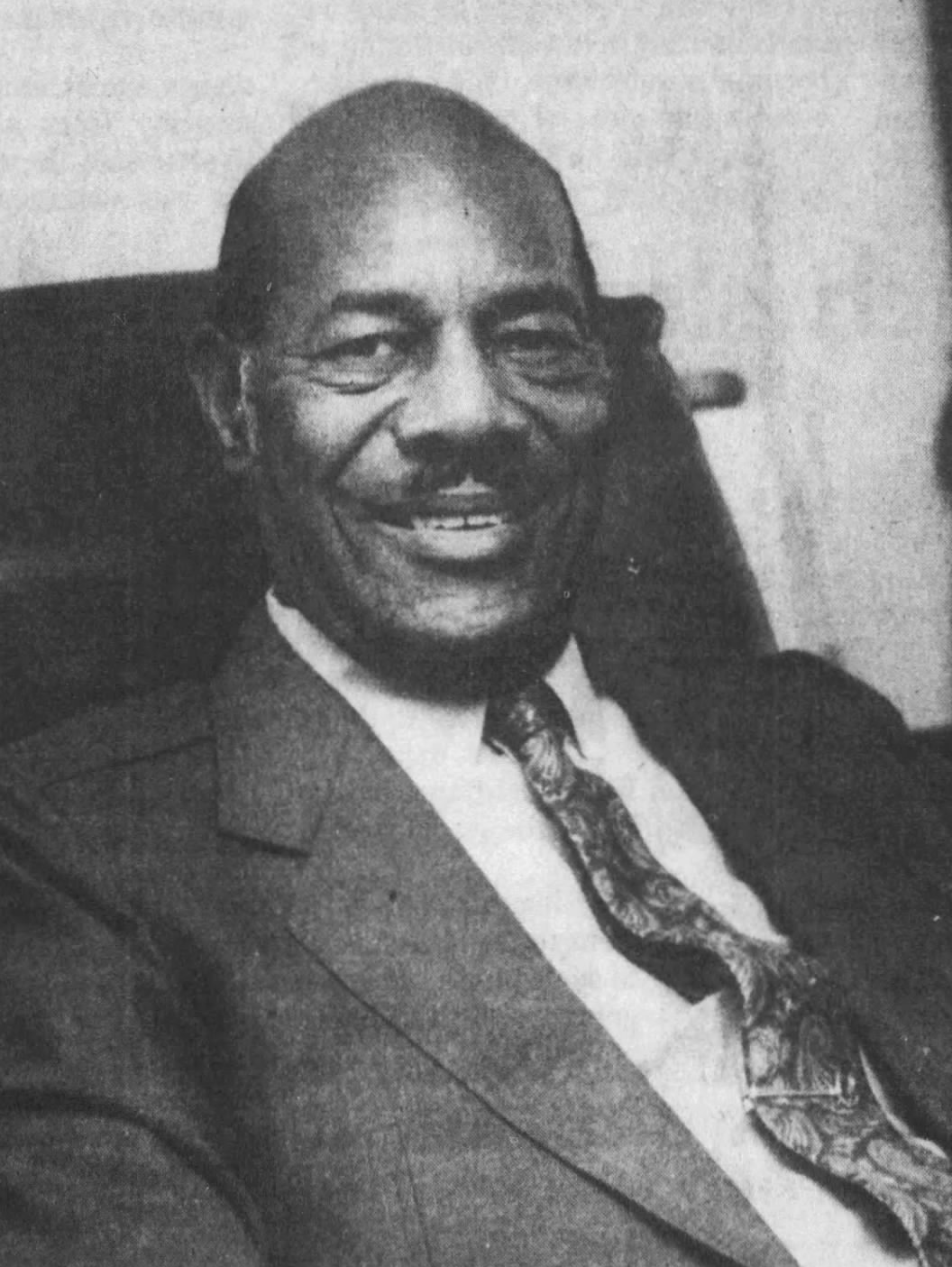
- Blount in 1987

Member of the Maryland Senate from the 41st district
- In office January 11, 1971 – January 8, 2003
- Succeeded by: Lisa Gladden
- Constituency: Baltimore

Personal details
- Born: April 20, 1921 North Carolina
- Died: April 12, 2003 (aged 81) Baltimore, Maryland, U.S.
- Resting place: Woodlawn Cemetery; 38°53′6″N 76°56′19″W
- Party: Democratic
- Occupation: principal, teacher, mentor

Clarence W. Blount (April 20, 1921 – April 12, 2003) was an American politician who was the first African American to be the majority leader of the Maryland State Senate. He represented the 41st district in Baltimore, from January 11, 1971, to January 8, 2003.

== Early life and education ==
Blount was born to Lottie and Charles Johnson Blount Sr., in South Creek, North Carolina, one of four children. As a child, Blount helped his father work on a tobacco plantation. The Blount family was so poor that they could not afford to buy their children shoes. When Blount was five years old, his mother died, and his family moved to Baltimore during the Great Depression, growing up in the 400 block of North Carey Street. It was only after the family moved to Baltimore that Clarence Blount was able to begin school at the age of 10.

He attended Baltimore City public schools and graduated from Douglass High School and then entered Morgan State College, during which he was drafted into the then segregated United States Army to fight in World War II. He served with distinction in Italy as a member of the all-Black Buffalo Division of the 92nd Infantry. The courage and dedication to duty that he demonstrated while removing mines from a river passage earned him a battlefield commission. After fighting for his country against both the enemy and the barriers of Jim Crow, Blount returned to Morgan State in 1946 and graduated in 1950 with a B.A. in political science. Blount later attended Johns Hopkins University, where he earned an M.L.A. degree in 1965. Clarence Blount was a former principal and educator at Dunbar High School and a former executive assistant to president at the Community College of Baltimore.

== Career ==
Blount entered politics in the early 1970s, becoming a member of the Democratic National Committee. He was Delegate to the Democratic Party National Convention in 1988, 1992, 1996 and 2000.

=== Maryland State Senate ===
Blount was elected to the Maryland State Senate in 1970 to represent Maryland 41st district which was and still is entirely in the boundaries of Baltimore. In 1983, Senate President Thomas V. Miller Jr. chose Blount to be the Majority Leader of the Maryland Senate, making him its first African-American majority leader. He held this position until he left office in 2003. In 1987, he became the first Black chairman of a Senate committee – the Economic and Environmental Affairs Committee. His demeanor and stature as an educator and veteran earned him the nickname of "The Conscience of the Senate". He also served on the following committees:

- Judicial Proceedings Committee, 1971–1974
- Joint Committee on Legislative Ethics, 1972–1974
- Vice-Chair, Budget and Taxation Committee, 1975–1986 (past chair, health, education & human resources subcommittee)
- Member, Executive Nominations Committee, 1975–2003
- Legislative Policy Committee, 1979–2003 (management subcommittee)
- Spending Affordability Committee, 1982–2003
- Joint Budget and Audit Committee, 1983–1997
- Rules Committee, 1983–2003
- Co-Chair, Joint Committee on State Economic Development Initiatives, 1995–1996
- Member, Special Joint Committee on Group Homes, 1995–1996
- Joint Audit Committee, 1997
- Special Study Commission on the Maryland Public Ethics Law, 1998
- Joint Committee on Children, Youth, and Families, 1999–2003
- Senate Chair, Joint Committee on the Port of Baltimore, 2000–2003
- Co-Chair, Senate Committee on Redistricting, 2001–2002
- Member, Special Committee on Gaming, 2001–2003
- Co-Chair, Joint Committee on the Selection of the State Treasurer, 2002

In 1984, Blount was elected chairman of the Legislative Black Caucus of Maryland and served in that capacity until 1986.

Blount played an instrumental role in the state takeover of the Baltimore school system in 1997, delivering a crucial speech before a vote on legislation that put millions of dollars into the school system in return for management reforms and a state role in running the system.

On July 6, 2002, Blount announced that he would not seek re-election in 2002.

=== Boston v. Blount ===
In 1998, state delegate Frank Boston filed a lawsuit against Blount, alleging that Blount lived outside of the district he represented and should be removed from the ballot. Boston was running against Blount in the Democratic primary. At the time of the lawsuit, Blount kept an apartment with no telephone and only a futon to sleep on within the district, but lived in Pikesville, which is located outside of the district in Baltimore County. Blount's attorneys argued in court that Blount qualified to represent the district because of this apartment, relying in part on Maryland Attorney General Stephen H. Sachs's 1984 opinion that listed 20 elements that determined a politician's residence. In August 1998, Anne Arundel County Circuit Court Judge Michael E. Loney ruled that Blount lived outside of the district and was ineligible to run in it, removing his name from the ballot; Blount appealed the ruling the day after. In September 1998, the Maryland Court of Appeals ruled in favor of Blount, putting him back on the Democratic primary ballot and overturning the lower court ruling. Court of Appeals Judge John C. Eldridge wrote in the court's 29-page opinion that while the Court acknowledged that Blount's apartment was not his home, but argued that a "domicile" doesn't mean a lawmaker's primary residence. "The requirement is that one must be domiciled in the district, and domicile is not synonymous with party place of abode." The decision would come to be known as the "Clarence Blount rule".

In 2022, Maryland state senator Charles E. Sydnor III introduced and passed a bill that would place a referendum on the ballot to amend the state constitution to overturn the Boston v. Blount decision, requiring candidates to "maintain a primary place of abode" in their district for at least six months before the general election.

== Legacy ==
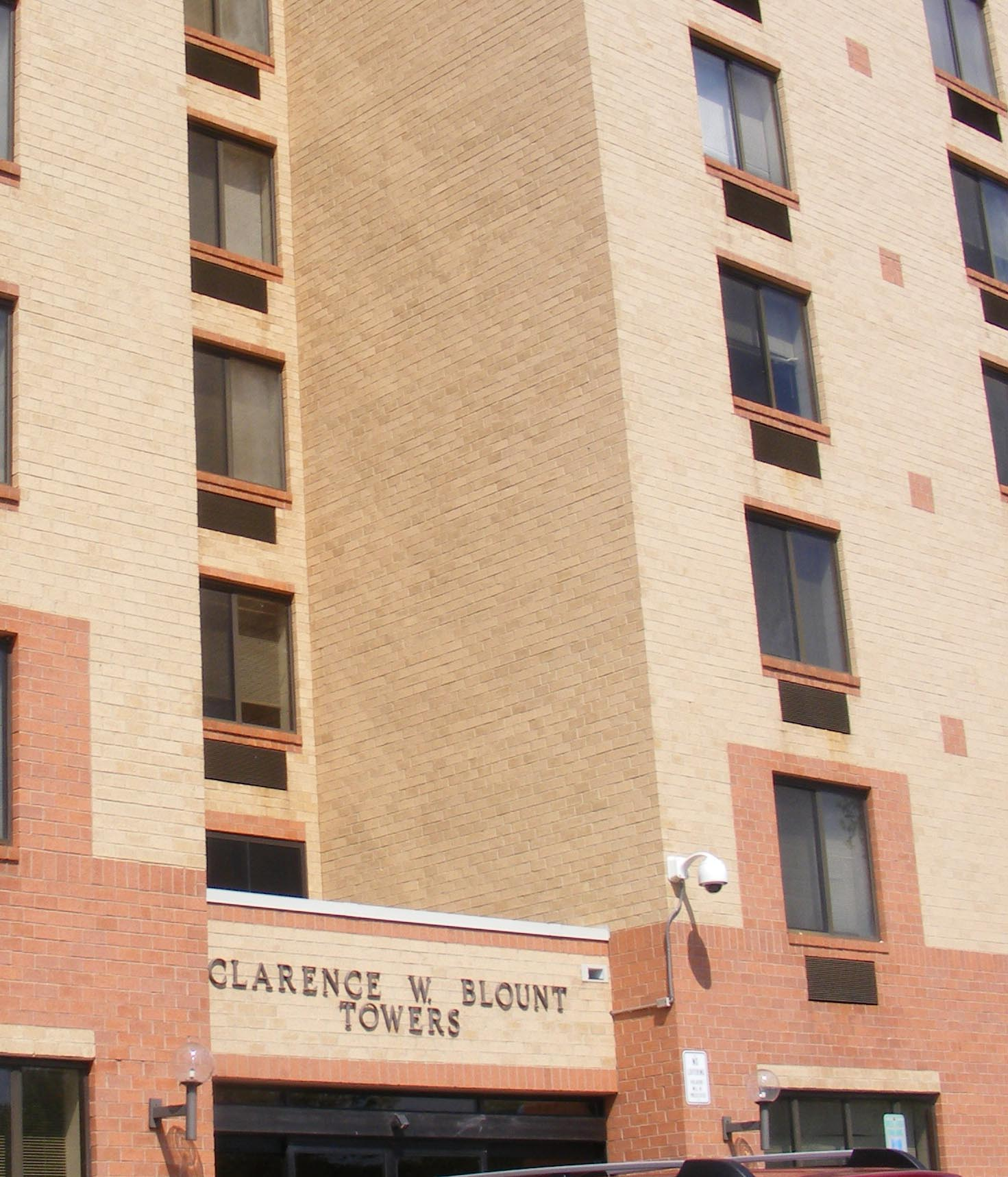
Clarence W. Blount Towers at Morgan State University in Baltimore

Clarence W. Blount died April 12, 2003, of complications from a stroke; he was 81. Memorial services were held at the Carl J. Murphy Fine Arts Center at Morgan State University, and were moderated by state senator Joan Carter Conway. U.S. Senator Paul Sarbanes, U.S. Representatives Ben Cardin and Elijah Cummings, and current and former city, state, and judicial leaders spoke at the memorial service. After his funeral service, Blount was laid to rest in Woodlawn Cemetery. U.S. Representative Elijah Cummings honored Blount in a speech on the House floor on May 1, 2003:

Clarence Blount realized and accepted the truth that our lives do not belong to us alone. He led his life on the principle that he was placed upon this earth to lead others through the same doors to opportunity that he had opened for himself. Clarence Blount was a man whose humility and compassion for others was his greatest strength, an ordinary man called to the extraordinary mission of uplifting other human beings.

— Congressman Elijah Cummings

The Clarence W. Blount Towers on the campus of Morgan State University were named in his honor.

== Electoral history ==
Maryland Senate District 41 General Election, 1986
Party	Candidate	Votes	%
Democratic	Clarence W. Blount	13,722	100.0

Maryland Senate District 41 General Election, 1990
Party	Candidate	Votes	%
Democratic	Clarence W. Blount	10,681	100.0

Maryland Senate District 41 General Election, 1994
Party	Candidate	Votes	%
Democratic	Clarence W. Blount	15,902	100.0

Maryland Senate District 41 Democratic Primary Election, 1998
Party	Candidate	Votes	%
Democratic	Clarence W. Blount	6,263	68.3
Democratic	Frank D. Boston Jr.	2,719	29.7
Democratic	Gregory Truitt	186	2.0

Maryland Senate District 41 General Election, 1998
Party	Candidate	Votes	%
Democratic	Clarence W. Blount	17,388	100.0
