= Nathaniel Exum =

American politician (1940–2021)

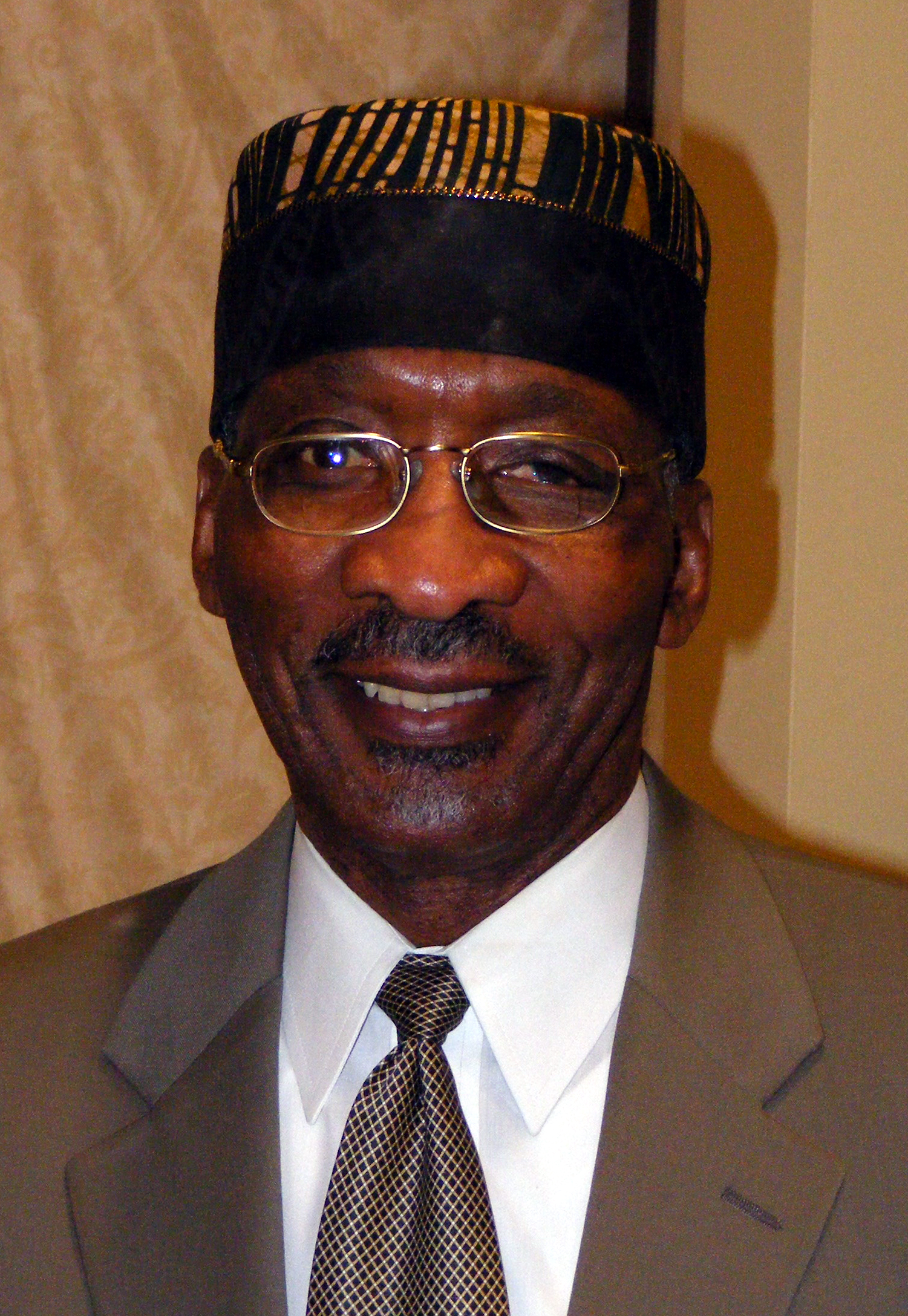

Member of the Maryland Senate from the 24th district
- In office 1999–2011
- Preceded by: Decatur "Bucky" Trotter
- Succeeded by: Joanne C. Benson
- Constituency: Prince George's County

Member of the Maryland House of Delegates from the 25th district
- In office 1975–1999
- Constituency: Prince George's County

Personal details
- Born: February 28, 1940 Memphis, Tennessee, U.S.
- Died: December 3, 2021 (aged 81) Peppermill Village, Maryland, U.S.
- Party: Democratic

Nathaniel Exum (February 28, 1940 – December 3, 2021) was an American politician from Maryland, a member of the Democratic Party and former member of the Maryland State Senate, representing Maryland's District 24 in Prince George's County.

Exum died from a lengthy illness at his home in Peppermill Village, Maryland, on December 3, 2021.

== Background ==
Exum grew up in Memphis, Tennessee, and moved to the Washington, D.C., area to attend Howard University. After serving in the United States Army, he became a safety director for Joseph Smith & Sons. He was active with a number of community, religious, and civic organizations, including the Kiwanis, the NAACP, and the Metropolitan African Methodist Episcopal Church. Senator Exum, 81, died on December 3, 2021, at his home in Prince George's County after a lengthy illness.

== In the legislature ==
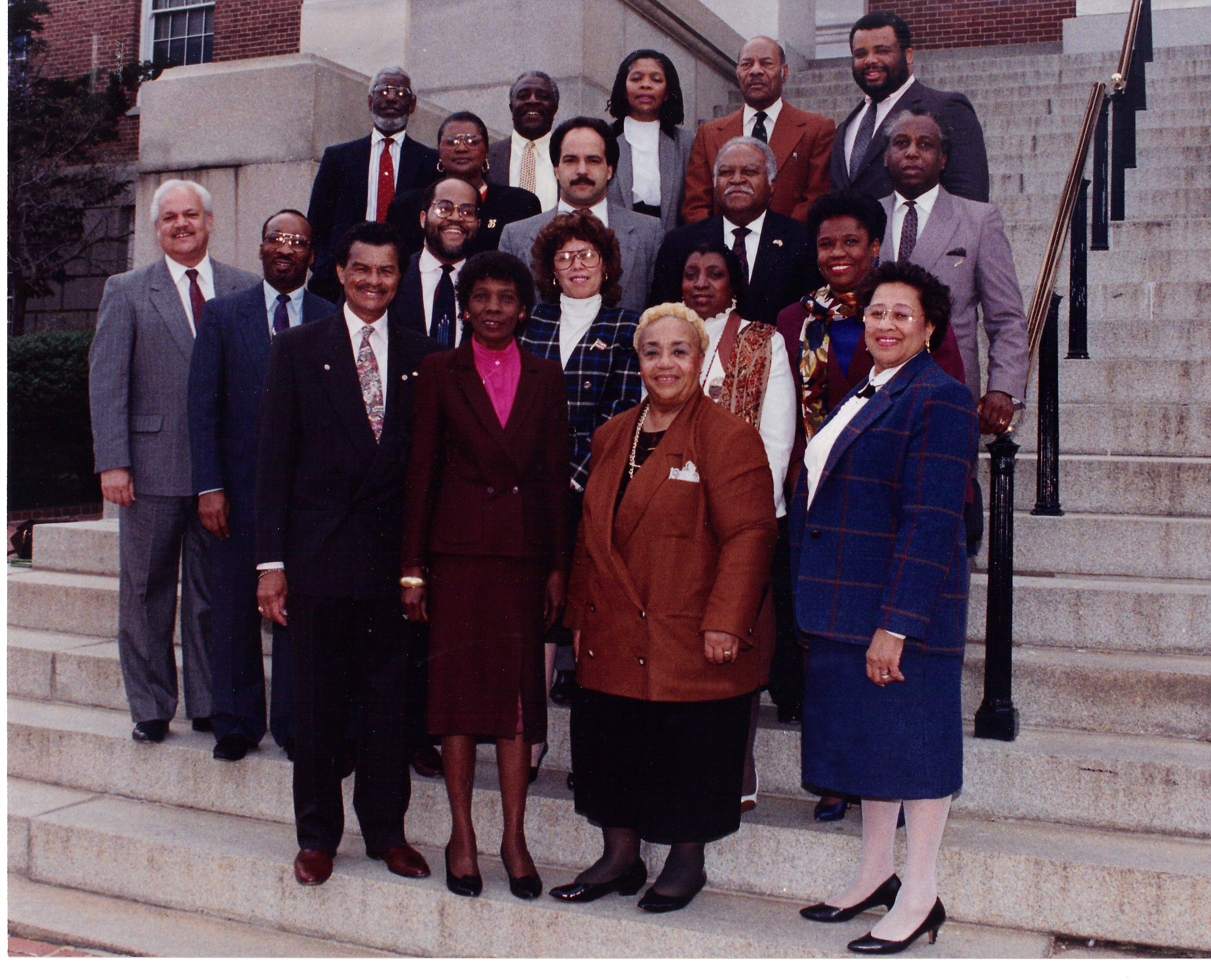
Exum with the 1992 Legislative Black Caucus of Maryland

Exum was originally elected to the House of Delegates in 1974, representing District 25 in Prince George's County. He ran for and won a seat in the State Senate in 1998, though due to redistricting he represented District 24 before being defeated. He had at various times served as Chair and Co-Chair of his county delegation, as Chaplain and Treasurer of the Legislative Black Caucus of Maryland, and was a member of the Veteran's Caucus.
