= Maryland Legislative District 24 =

American legislative district

Maryland's legislative district 24
- Represents part of Prince George's County
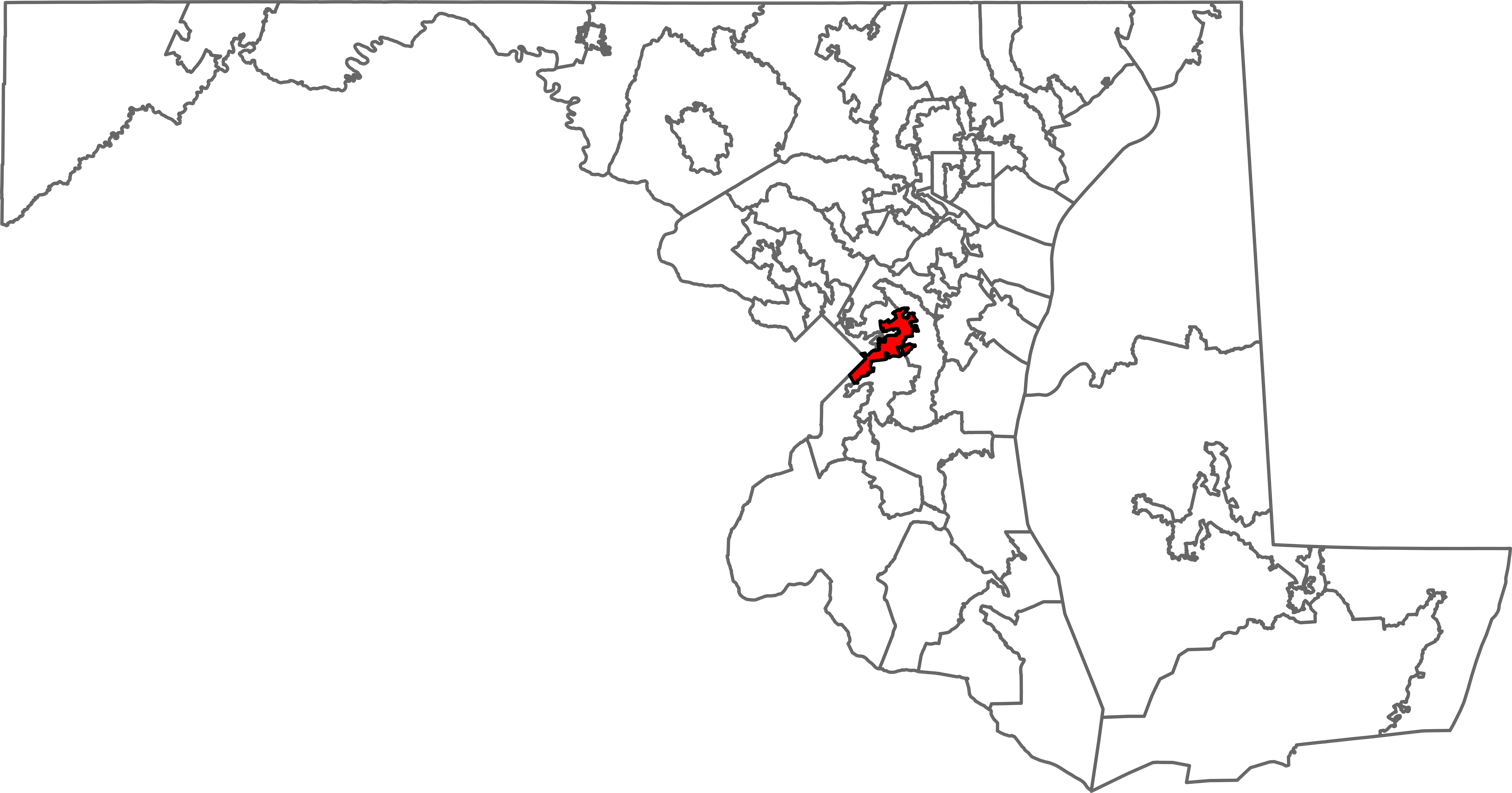
- Senator: Joanne C. Benson (D)
- Delegate(s): Andrea Fletcher Harrison (D); Tiffany T. Alston (D); Derrick L. Coley (D)
- Registration: 83.3% Democratic; 3.8% Republican; 11.0% unaffiliated
- Demographics: 5.1% White; 79.5% Black/African American; 0.5% Native American; 2.2% Asian; 0.0% Hawaiian/Pacific Islander; 7.4% Other race; 5.4% Two or more races; 11.2% Hispanic
- Population (2020): 129,603
- Voting-age population: 101,651
- Registered voters: 91,858

Maryland Legislative District 24 is one of 47 districts in the state for the Maryland General Assembly. It covers part of Prince George's County. The district is represented by three delegates in the Maryland House of Delegates.

== Demographic characteristics ==
As of the 2020 United States census, the district had a population of 129,603, of whom 101,651 (78.4%) were of voting age. The racial makeup of the district was 6,595 (5.1%) White, 102,972 (79.5%) African American, 584 (0.5%) Native American, 2,814 (2.2%) Asian, 6 (0.0%) Pacific Islander, 9,640 (7.4%) from some other race, and 6,957 (5.4%) from two or more races. Hispanic or Latino of any race were 14,498 (11.2%) of the population.

The district had 91,858 registered voters as of October 17, 2020, of whom 10,060 (11.0%) were registered as unaffiliated, 3,450 (3.8%) were registered as Republicans, 76,498 (83.3%) were registered as Democrats, and 1,559 (1.7%) were registered to other parties.

== Political representation ==
The district is represented for the 2023–2027 legislative term in the State Senate by Joanne C. Benson (D) and in the House of Delegates by Tiffany T. Alston (D), Andrea Fletcher Harrison (D) and Derrick L. Coley (D).

== Election history ==
Years	Senator	Party	Electoral history
January 8, 1975 – May 24, 1982	Edward T. Conroy	Democratic	Redistricted from District 4-A and re-elected in 1974. Re-elected in 1978. Died.
June 25, 1982 – January 12, 1983	Mary A. Conroy	Democratic	Appointed to serve the remainder of Conroy's term.
January 12, 1983 – October 20, 1983	Tommie Broadwater	Democratic	Redistricted from the 25th district and re-elected in 1982. Resigned.
January 12, 1983 – January 9, 1991	Decatur Trotter	Democratic	Appointed to serve the remainder of Broadwater's term. Elected in 1986. Re-elected in 1990. Re-elected in 1994. Lost renomination.
January 9, 1991 – January 12, 2011	Nathaniel Exum	Democratic	Elected in 1998. Re-elected in 2002. Re-elected in 2006. Lost re-nomination.
January 12, 2011 – January 13, 2027	Joanne C. Benson	Democratic	Elected in 2010. Re-elected in 2014. Re-elected in 2018. Re-elected in 2022. Retired.
January 13, 2027 – present	Tiffany T. Alston	Democratic	Elected in 2026.
