= Derrick Coley =

American politician (born 1975)

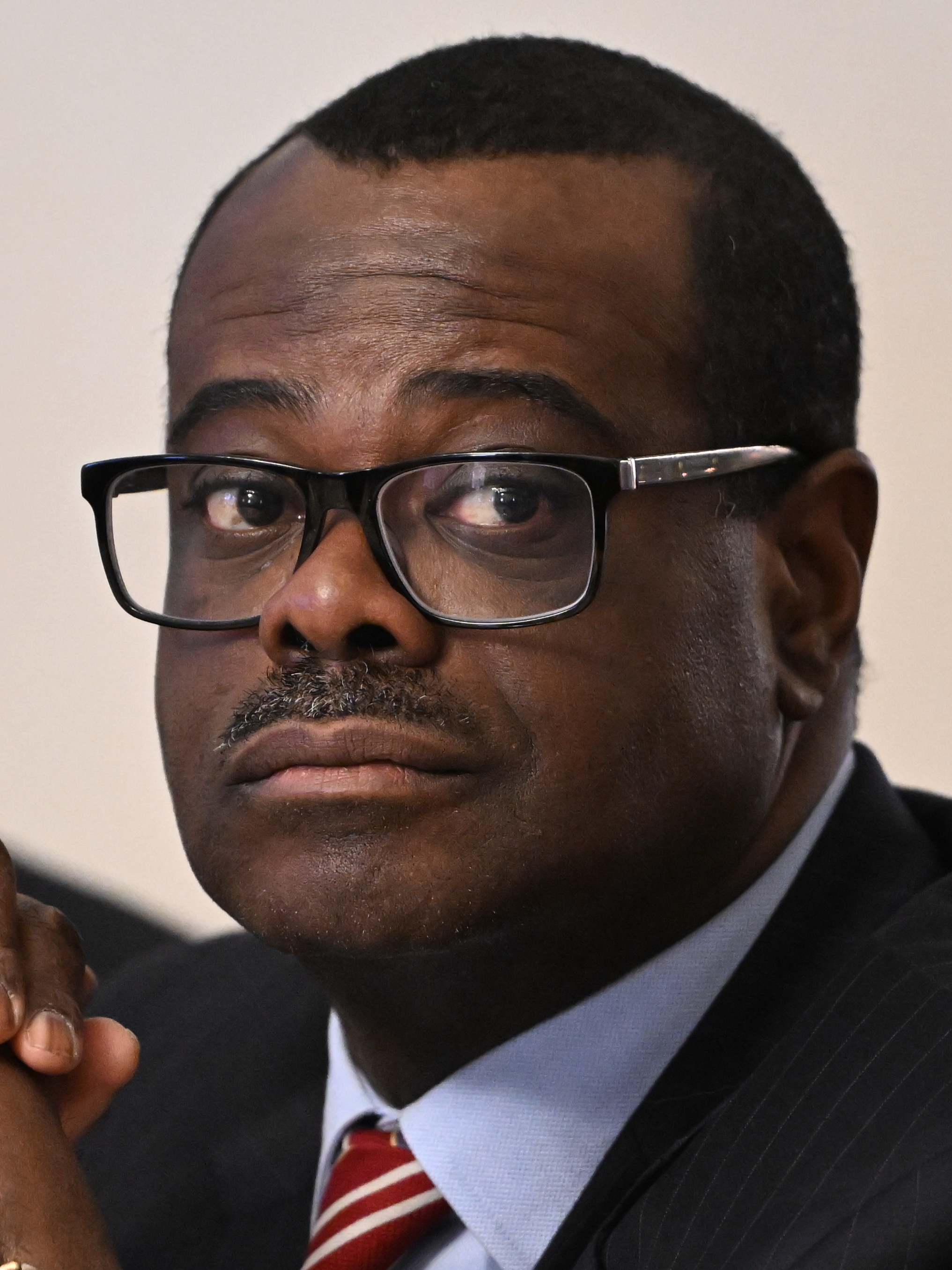
- Coley in 2026

Member of the Maryland House of Delegates from the 24th district
- Incumbent
- Assumed office January 13, 2026 Serving with Tiffany T. Alston and Andrea Harrison
- Appointed by: Wes Moore
- Preceded by: Jazz Lewis

Personal details
- Born: 1975 (age 50–51)
- Party: Democratic
- Spouse: Okeysha Brooks (m. 2002)
- Education: North Carolina State University (BA); American University (MA)

Derrick L. Coley (born 1975) is an American politician who has served as a Democratic member of the Maryland House of Delegates from the 24th district since 2026.

== Early life and education ==
Coley was born in 1975. He graduated from Suitland High School, afterwards attending North Carolina State University, where he earned a Bachelor of Science degree in biological sciences in 1998, and American University, where he earned a Master of Arts degree in public policy in 2003.

== Career ==
Coley previously worked as a staff associate at the United States Conference of Mayors, where he managed the organization's annual "Recycling America's Land: A National Report on Brownfield Redevelopment" report and collaborated with the federal government to promote sustainable development in American cities. He later worked as an assistant to Michael Herman, the chief of staff of Prince George's County Executive Jack B. Johnson, until 2004, afterwards serving as a deputy chief of staff to Johnson from 2004 to 2009 and as Johnson's chief of staff from 2009 to 2010. In 2011, Coley was appointed as a public affairs liaison for the Prince George's County Council. He later served as the executive director of external relations for the Maryland Higher Education Commission and as the special assistant for government operations at Bowie State University. From summer 2025 to January 2026, Coley worked as a deputy director for the Prince George's County Department of the Environment, supervising the Animal Services Division, Climate and Energy Division, and legislative affairs.

Coley unsuccessfully ran for the Prince George's County Council in the 3rd district in 2006, placing third in the Democratic primary with 12.5 percent of the vote.

== In the legislature ==
In December 2025, after state delegate Jazz Lewis announced that he would resign from the Maryland House of Delegates, Coley applied to serve the remainder of Lewis's term. His candidacy was supported by Prince George's County Executive Aisha Braveboy. The Prince George's County Democratic Central Committee unanimously voted to nominate Coley to the seat on January 5, 2026. Governor Wes Moore appointed Coley to the seat on January 12, 2026, and he was sworn in the next day. He is a member of the Ways and Means Committee.

== Personal life ==
Coley married his wife, Okeysha Brooks, on August 31, 2002. Together, they have four children.

== Electoral history ==
Prince George's County Council District 3 Democratic primary election, 2006
Party	Candidate	Votes	%
Democratic	Eric C. Olson	3,480	41.7
Democratic	Florence Hendershot	2,477	29.7
Democratic	Derrick L. Coley	1,046	12.5
Democratic	Terence D. Collins	319	3.8
Democratic	James E. Henderson	299	3.6
Democratic	Kenneth Laureys	288	3.4
Democratic	Melvin B. Johnson	230	2.8
Democratic	Lee P. Walker	212	2.5
Total votes		8,351	100.0

Prince George's County Democratic Central Committee District 24 election, 2018
Party	Candidate	Votes	%
Democratic	Derrick L. Coley	35,537	33.2
Democratic	Chris Stevenson	30,812	28.8
Democratic	Pat Thornton	22,110	20.7
Democratic	Donjuan Williams	18,427	17.2
Total votes		106,886	100.0

Prince George's County Democratic Central Committee District 24 election, 2022
Party	Candidate	Votes	%
Democratic	Derrick L. Coley (incumbent)	60,631	58.2
Democratic	Rudy D. Anthony	43,499	41.8
Total votes		104,130	100.0
