= 2026 Maryland Question 3 =

Voter referendum

- November 3, 2026
- Election Districts – General Assembly and Representatives in Congress

Results
Choice	Votes	%
Yes	1,337,095	61.97%
No	820,545	38.03%
Valid votes	2,157,640	100.00%
Invalid or blank votes	0	0.00%
Total votes	2,157,640	100.00%
County results
Yes
80–90%
70–80%
60–70%
50–60%
No
70–80%
60–70%
50–60%

Question 3 was a voter referendum that appeared on the ballot on November 3, 2026. It clarified that guidelines in the Constitution of Maryland that require legislative districts to respect natural boundaries and the boundaries of political subdivisions only apply to Maryland's state legislative districts and not Maryland's congressional districts. The referendum was approved by voters with approximately 60% of the vote.

== Ballot measure ==
The ballot measure reads as follows:

Question 3
Constitutional Amendment

For the purpose of clarifying that certain requirements apply only to districts for the election of members of the Senate of Maryland and the House of Delegates; authorizing the General Assembly to grant original jurisdiction to the Supreme Court of Maryland to review the congressional districting plan of the State; and providing that nothing in the Maryland Constitution provides applicable criteria for the boundaries of a congressional districting plan.

The choices read as follows:

For the Constitutional Amendment
Against the Constitutional Amendment

== Background ==
=== 2022 legislative session ===
In December 2021, the Maryland General Assembly convened for a special legislative session to pass a new congressional redistricting plan proposed by the Legislative Redistricting Advisory Commission. Under this map, Maryland's 1st congressional district—which is represented by Andy Harris, the only Republican in Maryland's congressional delegation—would have been redrawn to include the Eastern Shore of Maryland and portions of Anne Arundel County and Harford County, thereby improving the Democratic Party's chances of winning the district. This map was vetoed by Governor Larry Hogan, after which the General Assembly voted to override Hogan's veto.

Shortly after the legislative session, lawsuits against the congressional redistricting plan were filed by Judicial Watch, Fair Maps Maryland, and Republican state delegates Kathy Szeliga, Christopher T. Adams, and Neil Parrott. In March 2022, Senior Judge Lynne A. Battaglia ruled that state's congressional redistricting plan violated the Constitution of Maryland, citing a provision that requires each legislative district to "consist of adjoining territory, be compact in form, and of substantially equal population" and that districts respect natural boundaries and the boundaries of political subdivisions. In response, the Maryland General Assembly passed a new congressional redistricting plan that included seven safe Democratic districts and one safe Republican seat, which was signed into law by Governor Hogan.

=== 2026 legislative session ===
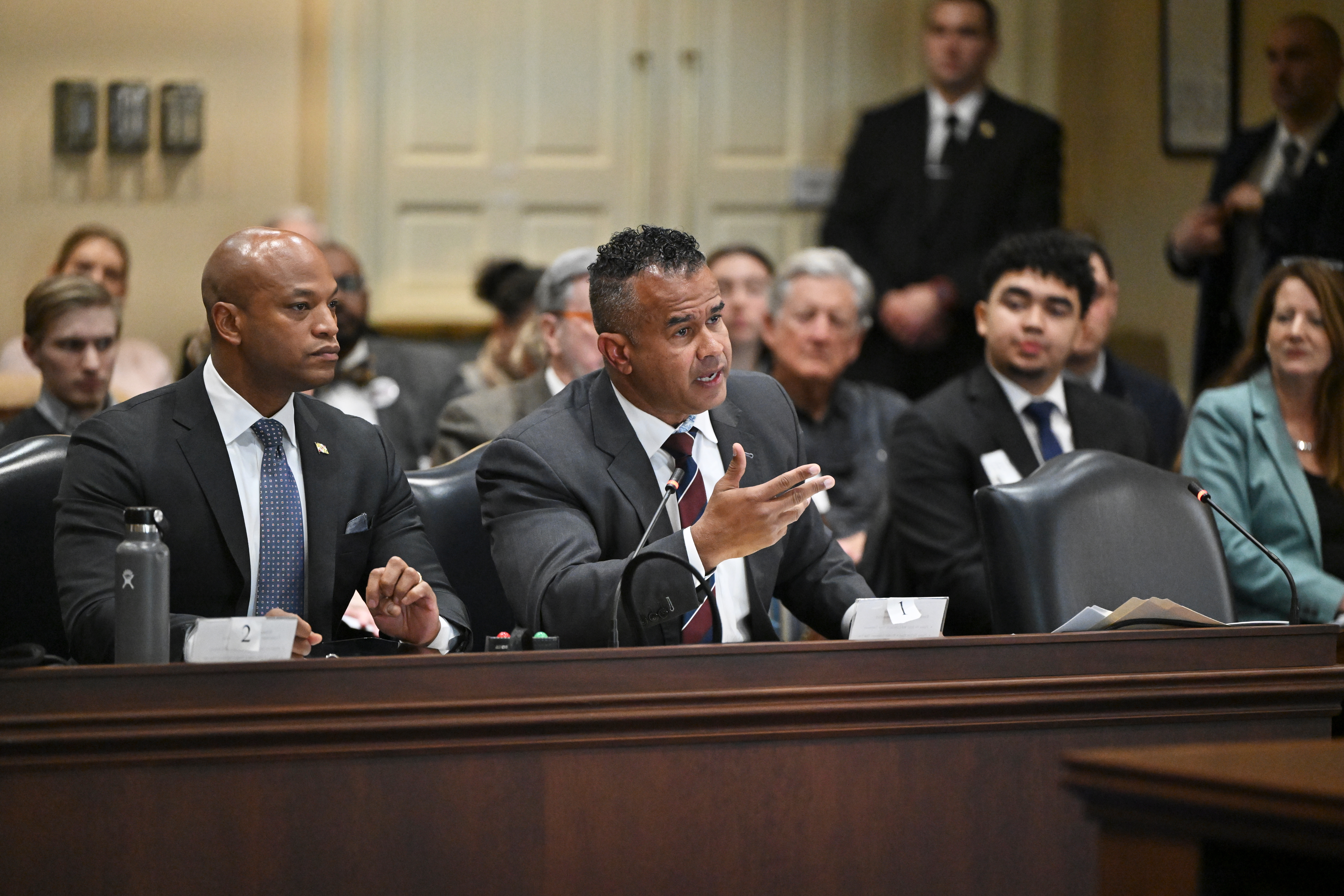
Maryland governor Wes Moore and state delegate C. T. Wilson testify in support of legislation to redraw Maryland's congressional districts, 2026

In 2025, after Texas and Missouri redrew their congressional maps to give Republicans in the state an advantage in the 2026 United States House of Representatives elections, Maryland Governor Wes Moore and House Speaker Adrienne A. Jones expressed openness toward redrawing Maryland's congressional districts to counter these efforts. However, in October 2025, Senate President Bill Ferguson wrote to his Democratic Senate colleagues rejecting efforts to redraw the state's congressional districts, expressing concerns that a new map would get overturned by courts and redrawn into one that allows Republicans to gain another congressional seat in Maryland. In November 2025, Moore formed the Governor's Redistricting Advisory Commission (GRAC), which would be tasked with holding public hearings and providing recommendations for a new congressional redistricting map. The five-member commission was chaired by U.S. senator Angela Alsobrooks and included two gubernatorial appointees and the General Assembly's two legislative leaders or their designees; Jones appointed state delegate C. T. Wilson to the commission, while Ferguson appointed himself. In January 2026, the GRAC voted 3–2 to recommend a new congressional redistricting plan that would redraw the 1st congressional district to make it more favorable for Democrats. This map passed the Maryland House of Delegates by a 99–37 vote in February 2026, but was blocked from receiving a vote in the Maryland Senate by Ferguson. Ferguson referred the bill to the Senate Rules Committee, where it never received a hearing nor a vote.

In March 2026, the House Government, Labor, and Elections Committee amended Senate Bill 5, a bill that proposed changing the Constitution of Maryland to require special elections to be held in most cases to fill vacancies in the Maryland General Assembly, to add a provision to the proposed constitutional amendment that would clarify that the constitution's redistricting guidelines only apply to legislative districts and not congressional districts. Ferguson rejected this amendment, saying that it would violate the Maryland Constitution's "single subject rule", which requires that General Assembly bills only tackle one topic at a time. He also told reporters that redistricting was not among the Senate's top priorities in the final weeks of the legislative session, and the Senate would not pass the bill if the House retained its redistricting amendment. The House passed the special elections bill with the redistricting amendment intact, after which the bill returned to the Senate, where it did not receive a vote.

The Maryland General Assembly adjourned sine die on April 13, 2026.

=== 2026 special legislative session ===
House vote

Senate vote
Democratic yea
Democratic nay
Democratic absentees
Republican nay
Republican absentees

Following the U.S. Supreme Court's ruling in Louisiana v. Callais, which limited challenges to gerrymandered maps using the Voting Rights Act of 1965, several Republican-led states in the Southern United States passed new congressional redistricting plans that dismantled multiple majority-Black congressional districts. On July 7, 2026, leaders of the Maryland General Assembly announced that they would convene a special session in August 2026, to pass legislation placing a referendum on the general election ballot asking voters to add a provision to the state constitution clarifying that redistricting guidelines in the constitution only apply to districts used to elect members of the Maryland General Assembly. If approved by voters, the proposed changes to the state constitution would allow the legislature to potentially redraw the state's congressional map for the 2028 United States House of Representatives elections to make Maryland's 1st congressional district more favorable for Democrats.

Maryland Republicans denounced the special session, accusing Moore of using the special session to boost his "national ambitions" and complaining of overreach by the Maryland General Assembly's Democratic supermajority. Republicans also criticized Moore and legislative leaders for failing to focus on local issues said they planned to use the special session to introduce bills relating to tax issues. Ferguson and Peña-Melnyk later sent a letter to legislators notifying them that they had instructed the Department of Legislative Services to "accept bill drafting requests for the special session only if they relate to the purpose for which the General Assembly is being reconvened: consideration of legislation concerning redistricting standards", preventing Republicans from introducing unrelated bills.

The Maryland General Assembly convened for its special session on August 3, 2026. During the special session, Republicans introduced 29 amendments to the proposed constitutional amendment relating to taxes, gas prices, redistricting, and restrictions on voting; most amendments were defeated in mostly party-line votes, while others were ruled out of order under the Constitution's single-subject rule. On August 4, the House of Delegates voted 96–38 and the Senate voted 32–13 to pass the redistricting amendment, placing it on the general election ballot. Delegate Sheree Sample-Hughes was the only Democrat to vote against the bill.

== Campaign ==
Signs advocating for a "Yes" vote (left) and "No" vote (right) on Question 3

Question 3 is supported by Fight Back MD and the Maryland Democratic Party. It is opposed by Save Our Voice, Protect Maryland Votes, Truth for Maryland, and the Maryland Republican Party. In its advertisements, Fight Back MD sought to frame the referendum's approval as a means of countering the second presidency of Donald Trump. Question 3's opponents, meanwhile, sought to portray the referendum as something that would open the door to extreme partisan gerrymandering in Maryland and lead to the disenfranchisement of Republican voters in the state.

In October 2026, Truth for Maryland began airing an advertisement on streaming services that used photos of Moore, his campaign's slogans, and color motif to encourage Maryland voters to support Moore's re-election campaign while voting against Question 3. Moore's legal team issued a cease-and-desist order against Truth for Maryland, accusing it of "attempting to trick individuals into believing that Governor Moore is opposing Question 3" by using his campaign's logos and designs without permission. Moore's legal team also referred the group to state elections officials for appearing to violate a state law prohibiting individuals from intentionally spreading election misinformation. Truth for Maryland refused to comply with the cease-and-desist order.

=== Legal challenges ===
In August 2026, the Oversight Project, the Maryland Freedom Caucus, and state senators Steve Hershey and Justin Ready filed a lawsuit against Question 3 in Anne Arundel County, challenging that lawmakers violated a new state law that requires the Maryland Secretary of State to certify statewide ballot question language for the general election by July 1 and to provide a 15-day public comment period on proposed ballot language. Under Senate Bill 29, which the Maryland General Assembly passed during the 2026 legislative session and went into effect on June 1, ballot questions must be written in plain language and must be prepared and certified by the Maryland Secretary of State by July 1, and the Maryland State Board of Elections must allow for a 15-day period for public comment. The redistricting referendum bill passed by the Maryland General Assembly during the 2026 special session exempts itself from these requirements to allow the question to be on the ballot for the 2026 general election. Later that month, state delegate Christopher T. Adams and state senators Mary Beth Carozza, Johnny Mautz, and Chris West filed a second lawsuit in Dorchester County, which raised similar legal arguments as the Anne Arundel County complaint.

On August 26, Anne Arundel County circuit court judge Robert Thompson ruled against Question 3, issuing an injunction removing it from the general election ballot subject to further appeal. On August 28, circuit administrative judge James Sarbanes also ruled against the constitutional referendum. Democrats immediately appealed both rulings to the Maryland Supreme Court. On September 3, the Maryland Supreme Court—in a 5–2 decision—overturned the two lower court rulings but rewrote the language that would appear on the general election ballot.

In September 2026, Spencer Rhoda, a Republican candidate for Maryland House of Delegates District 9A in 2026, filed an appeal with the Supreme Court of Maryland arguing that the court's position that the ballot referendum's language was misleading to voters invalidated its placement on the ballot and questioned whether the Supreme Court had the ability to rewrite the ballot language.

=== Endorsements ===
Yes

U.S. Executive Branch officials

- Barack Obama, 44th president of the United States (2009–2017) (Democrat)

U.S. senators

- Angela Alsobrooks, Maryland (2025–present) (Democrat)
- Chris Van Hollen, Maryland (2017–present) (Democrat)

U.S. representatives

- Steny Hoyer, MD-05 (1981–present) (Democrat)
- Glenn Ivey, MD-04 (2023–present) (Democrat)
- Jamie Raskin, MD-08 (2017–present) (Democrat)

Statewide officials

- Brooke Lierman, Maryland Comptroller (2023–present) (Democrat)
- Aruna Miller, Maryland lieutenant governor (2023–present) (Democrat)
- Wes Moore, Maryland governor (2023–present) (Democrat)

State legislators

- Vanessa Atterbeary, former HD-13 (2015–2026) and Democratic nominee for Howard County Executive in 2026 (Democrat)
- Adrian Boafo, HD-23 (2023–present) and Democratic nominee for MD-05 in 2026 (Democrat)
- Arthur Ellis, SD-28 (2019–present) (Democrat)
- Kris Fair, HD-03 (2023–present) (Democrat)
- Bill Ferguson, president of the Maryland Senate (2021–present) from SD-46 (Democrat)
- Antonio Hayes, SD-40 (2019–present) (Democrat)
- Shelly Hettleman, SD-11 (2020–present) (Democrat)
- Cheryl Kagan, SD-17 (2015–present) (Democrat)
- Clarence Lam, SD-12 (2019–present) (Democrat)
- David Moon, majority leader of the Maryland House of Delegates (2023–present) from HD-20 (2015–present) (Democrat)
- Joseline Peña-Melnyk, speaker of the Maryland House of Delegates (2025–present) from HD-21 (2007–present) (Democrat)
- N. Scott Phillips, HD-10 (2023–present) (Democrat)
- Joe Vogel, HD-17 (2023–present) (Democrat)
- Ron Watson, SD-23 (2021–present) (Democrat)
- Mary L. Washington, SD-43 (2019–present) (Democrat)
- C. T. Wilson, HD-28 (2011–present) (Democrat)

Local officials

- Aisha Braveboy, Prince George's County executive (2025–present) (Democrat)
- Steuart Pittman, Anne Arundel County executive (2018–present) and chair of the Maryland Democratic Party (2025–present) (Democrat)
- Brandon Scott, mayor of Baltimore (2020–present) (Democrat)

Labor unions

- American Federation of State, County and Municipal Employees Council 3
- Service Employees International Union Local 500

Organizations

- Maryland Democratic Party
No

U.S. representatives

- Andy Harris, MD-01 (2011–present) and chair of the Freedom Caucus (2024–present) (Republican)

Statewide officials

- Larry Hogan, former Maryland governor (2015–2023) (Republican)

State legislators

- Christopher T. Adams, HD-37B (2015–present) (Republican)
- Lauren Arikan, HD-7B (2019–present) (Republican)
- Jason C. Buckel, minority leader of the Maryland House of Delegates (2021–present) from HD-1B (2015–present) (Republican)
- Mary Beth Carozza, SD-38 (2019–present) (Republican)
- Brian Chisholm, HD-31 (2019–present) (Republican)
- Dan Cox, former HD-04 (2019–2023) and nominee for governor in 2022 and 2026 (Republican)
- Josh Hastings, state delegate-elect from district 38B (Democrat)
- Steve Hershey, minority leader of the Maryland Senate (2023–present) from SD-36 (2013–present) (Republican)
- Tom Hutchinson, HD-37B (2023–present) (Republican)
- J. B. Jennings, SD-07 (2011–present) (Republican)
- Johnny Mautz, SD-37 (2023–present) (Republican)
- Matthew Morgan, HD-29A (2015–present) (Republican)
- Ryan Nawrocki, HD-7A (2023–present) (Republican)
- Jesse Pippy, HD-04 (2019–present) (Republican)
- Justin Ready, SD-05 (2015–present) (Republican)
- Johnny Ray Salling, SD-06 (2015–present) (Republican)
- Bryan Simonaire, SD-31 (2007–present) (Republican)
- Kathy Szeliga, HD-7A (2011–present) (Republican)
- Chris Tomlinson, HD-05 (2023–present) (Republican)
- Chris West, SD-42 (2019–present) (Republican)

Local officials

- Bob Cassilly, Harford County executive (2022–present) (Republican)

Organizations

- Maryland Freedom Caucus
- Maryland Republican Party

== Fundraising ==
Campaign finance reports as of November 10, 2026
Campaign committee	Raised	Spent	Cash on hand
Fight Back MD (for)	$3,593,616	$3,491,718	$92,333
Protect Maryland Votes (against)	$346,915	$346,915	$0
Truth for Maryland (against)	$325,000	$299,151	$25,849
Source: Maryland State Board of Elections

== Opinion polls ==
Poll source	Date(s) administered	Sample size (Note: Key: A – all adults RV – registered voters LV – likely voters V – unclear)	Margin of error	For	Against	Undecided
University of Maryland, Baltimore County	September 22−27, 2026	776 (LV)	± 3.5%	25%	53%	19%
Hart Research Associates (D) (Note: Poll commissioned by Fight Back MD, which supports Question 3.)	September 8–10, 2026	600 (LV)	± 4.1%	40%	35%	25%
Lincoln Park Strategies (D)/Ragnar Research Partners (R) (Note: Poll commissioned by Protect Maryland Votes, which opposes Question 3.)	September 10–13, 2026	600 (LV)	± 4.0%	28%	41%	31%

== Results ==
2026 Maryland Question 3
Choice	Votes	%
For	1,337,095	61.97
Against	820,545	38.03
Total	2,157,640	100.00

== Notes ==
Partisan clients

== See also ==
- 2026 Florida redistricting
- 2026 Tennessee redistricting
- 2026 Missouri Proposition A
- 2026 Virginia redistricting referendum
- 2026 United States ballot measures
