= Maryland Legislative District 37 =

American legislative district

Maryland's legislative district 37
- Represents; Talbot County and parts of Caroline County, Dorchester County and Wicomico County
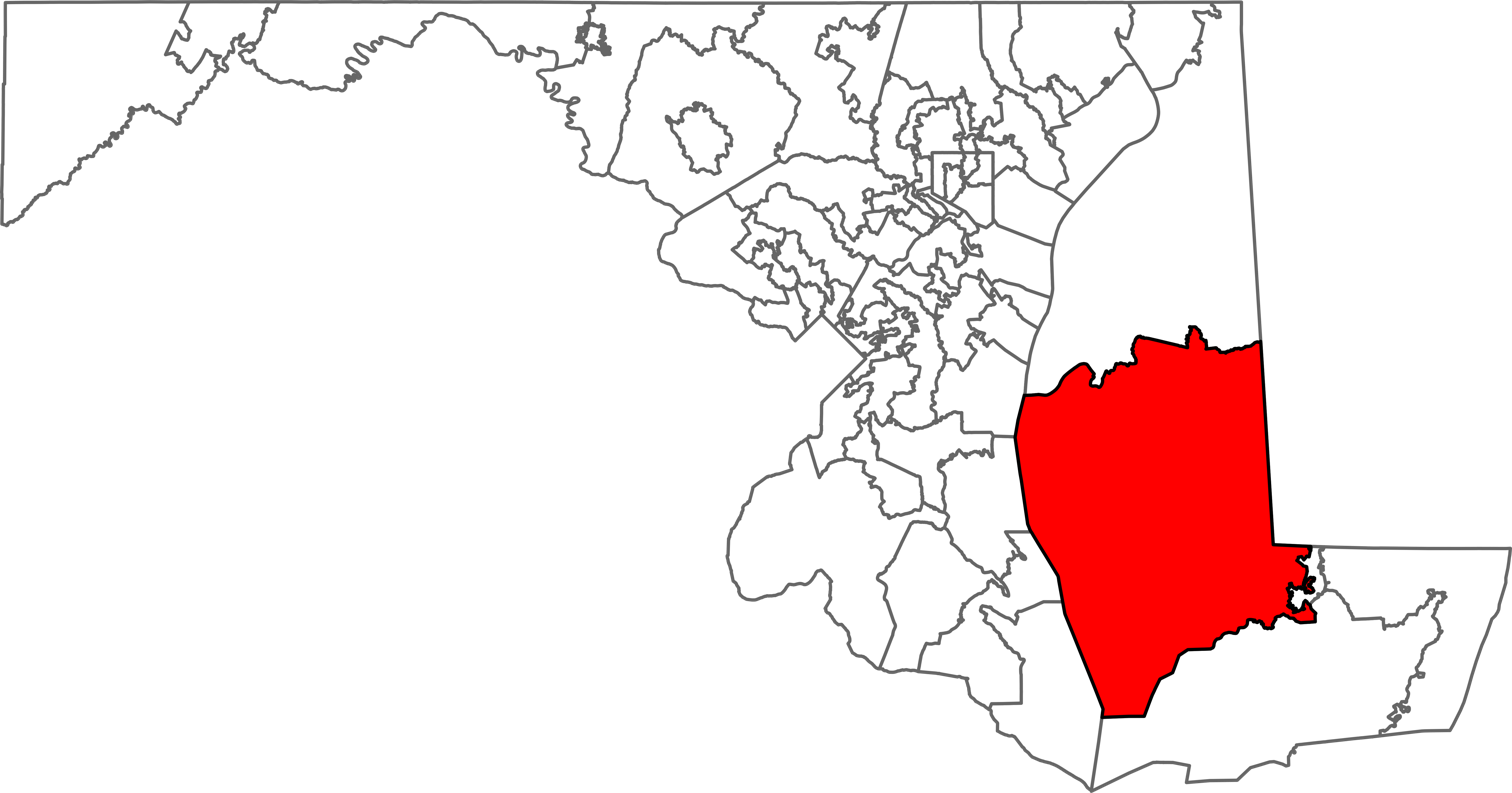
- Senator: John F. Mautz IV (R)
- Delegate(s): Sheree Sample-Hughes (D) (District 37A); Christopher T. Adams (R) (District 37B); Tom Hutchinson (R) (District 37B)
- Registration: 42.2% Democratic; 38.9% Republican; 17.5% unaffiliated
- Demographics: 63.0% White; 25.4% Black/African American; 0.4% Native American; 1.5% Asian; 0.0% Hawaiian/Pacific Islander; 3.7% Other race; 6.0% Two or more races; 6.9% Hispanic
- Population (2020): 127,669
- Voting-age population: 100,275
- Registered voters: 87,257

Maryland Legislative District 37 is one of 47 districts in the state for the Maryland General Assembly. It covers Talbot County, Maryland and parts of Caroline County, Dorchester County and Wicomico County. The district is divided into two sub-districts for the Maryland House of Delegates: District 37A and District 37B.

== Demographic characteristics ==
As of the 2020 United States census, the district had a population of 127,669, of whom 100,275 (78.5%) were of voting age. The racial makeup of the district was 80,393 (63.0%) White, 32,394 (25.4%) African American, 508 (0.4%) Native American, 1,921 (1.5%) Asian, 22 (0.0%) Pacific Islander, 4,776 (3.7%) from some other race, and 7,641 (6.0%) from two or more races. Hispanic or Latino of any race were 8,839 (6.9%) of the population.

The district had 87,257 registered voters as of October 17, 2020, of whom 15,252 (17.5%) were registered as unaffiliated, 33,926 (38.9%) were registered as Republicans, 36,814 (42.2%) were registered as Democrats, and 736 (0.8%) were registered to other parties.

== Educational institutions ==
=== High schools ===
The 37th district is home to six public high schools and one private high school.

==== Caroline County ====
- Colonel Richardson High School

==== Dorchester County ====
- Cambridge-South Dorchester High School
- North Dorchester High School

==== Talbot County ====
- Easton High School
- St. Michaels Middle/High School
- Saints Peter and Paul School

==== Wicomico County ====
- Mardela High School

=== Education proficiency ===
In 2023, Maryland State Department of Education School Report Cards indicated that the district's public high schools have lower proficiency in English and Math, and maintain above average graduation rates.

Maryland State Department of Education (MSDE) Report Card Averages (District 37)
School	% Proficient in Math	% Proficient in English	4-year Graduation Rate
Colonel Richardson High School	19.8%	49.5%	87.3%
Cambridge-South Dorchester High School	8.5%	38.6%	77.6%
Easton High School	21.2%	51.4%	96.8%
Mardela High School	33.8%	63.1%	95.3%
North Dorchester High School	14%	49.6%	88.4%
St. Michaels Middle/High School	27.7%	69.7%	100%
District 37 Average	20.8%	53.6%	90.9%
State Average	34.9%	56.1%	86.29%

== Political representation ==
The district is represented for the 2023–2027 legislative term in the State Senate by John F. Mautz IV (R) and in the House of Delegates by Sheree Sample-Hughes (D, District 37A), Christopher T. Adams (R, District 37B) and Tom Hutchinson (R, District 37B).

== History ==
=== 1994 redistricting ===
On January 14, 1994, Maryland was ordered to submit a plan for a new African American majority district on the Eastern Shore following Marylanders for Fair Representation, Inc. v. Schaefer. The U.S. District Court approved a plan to alter the boundaries of former legislative districts 36, 37, and 38, beginning with the 1994 general election. Following this, parts of Caroline County, Dorchester County, Talbot County and Wicomico County were provisioned for district 37.
