= Maryland House of Delegates District 37B =

American legislative district

Maryland's legislative district 37B
- Represents; Talbot County and parts of Caroline, Dorchester, and Wicomico counties
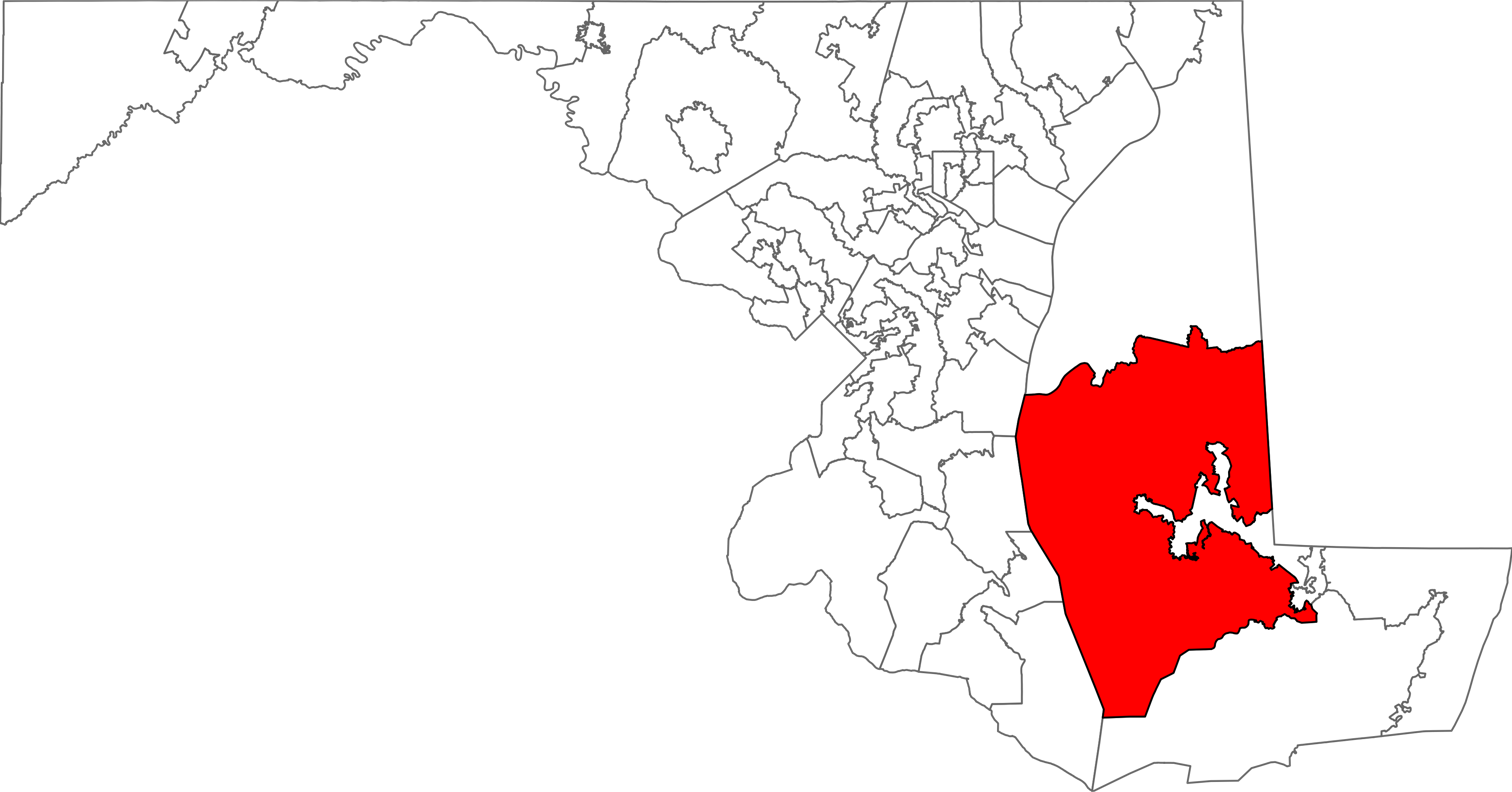
- Delegate(s): Christopher Adams (R); Tom Hutchinson (R)
- Registration: 46.1% Republican; 32.1% Democratic; 31.1% unaffiliated
- Demographics: 77.1% White; 11.3% Black/African American; 0.0% Native American; 0.0% Asian; 0.0% Hawaiian/Pacific Islander; 0.0% Other race; 0.0% Two or more races; 0.0% Hispanic
- Population (2020): 84,547
- Voting-age population: 68,361
- Registered voters: 67,413

Maryland House of Delegates District 37B is one of the 71 districts that compose the Maryland House of Delegates. Along with subdistrict 37A, it makes up the 37th district of the Maryland Senate. District 37B includes Talbot County and parts of Caroline, Dorchester, and Wicomico counties, and is represented by two delegates.

== Demographic characteristics ==
As of the 2020 United States census, the district had a population of 84,547, of whom 68,361 (80.8%) were of voting age. The racial makeup of the district was 65,150 (77.1%) White, 9,582 (11.3%) African American, 137 (0.0%) Native American, 1,300 (0.0%) Asian, 20 (0.0%) Pacific Islander, 319 (0.0%) from some other race, and 3,021 (0.0%) from two or more races. Hispanic or Latino of any race were 5,232 (0.0%) of the population.

The district had 67,413 registered voters as of October 20, 2024, of whom 13,602 (20.1%) were registered as unaffiliated, 21,627 (32.1%) were registered as Democrats, 31,066 (46.1%) were registered as Republicans, and 604 (0.1%) were registered to other parties.

== Past Election Results ==
=== 2010 ===
| Name | Party | Votes | Percent | Outcome |
|---|---|---|---|---|
| Adelaide Eckhardt | Republican | 23,106 | 41.3% | Won |
| Jeannie Haddaway | Republican | 22,309 | 39.9% | Won |
| Patrice L. Stanley | Democratic | 10,476 | 18.7 | Won |
| Other Write-Ins | | 82 | 0.1% | |

=== 2014 ===
| Name | Party | Votes | Percent | Outcome |
|---|---|---|---|---|
| Johnny Mautz | Republican | 21,057 | 39.8% | Won |
| Christopher Adams | Republican | 16,046 | 30.3% | Won |
| Keasha Haythe | Democratic | 7,957 | 15.0% | Lost |
| Rodney Benjamin | Democratic | 7,852 | 14.8% | Lost |
| Other Write-Ins | | 27 | 0.1% | |

=== 2018 ===
| Name | Party | Votes | Percent | Outcome |
|---|---|---|---|---|
| Johnny Mautz | Republican | 25,031 | 68.5% | Won |
| Christopher Adams | Republican | 19,498 | 33.9% | Won |
| Dan O'Hare | Democratic | 12,796 | 22.3% | Lost |
| Other Write-Ins | | 128 | 0.2% | |

=== 2022 ===
| Name | Party | Votes | Percent | Outcome |
|---|---|---|---|---|
| Christopher Adams | Republican | 21,694 | 37.3% | Won |
| Tom Hutchinson | Republican | 20,876 | 35.1% | Won |
| Susan Delean-Botkin | Democratic | 15,344 | 26.3% | Lost |
| Other Write-Ins | | 220 | 0.3% | |
