= Maryland House of Delegates District 37A =

American legislative district

Maryland's legislative district 37A
- Represents parts of Dorchester and Wicomico counties
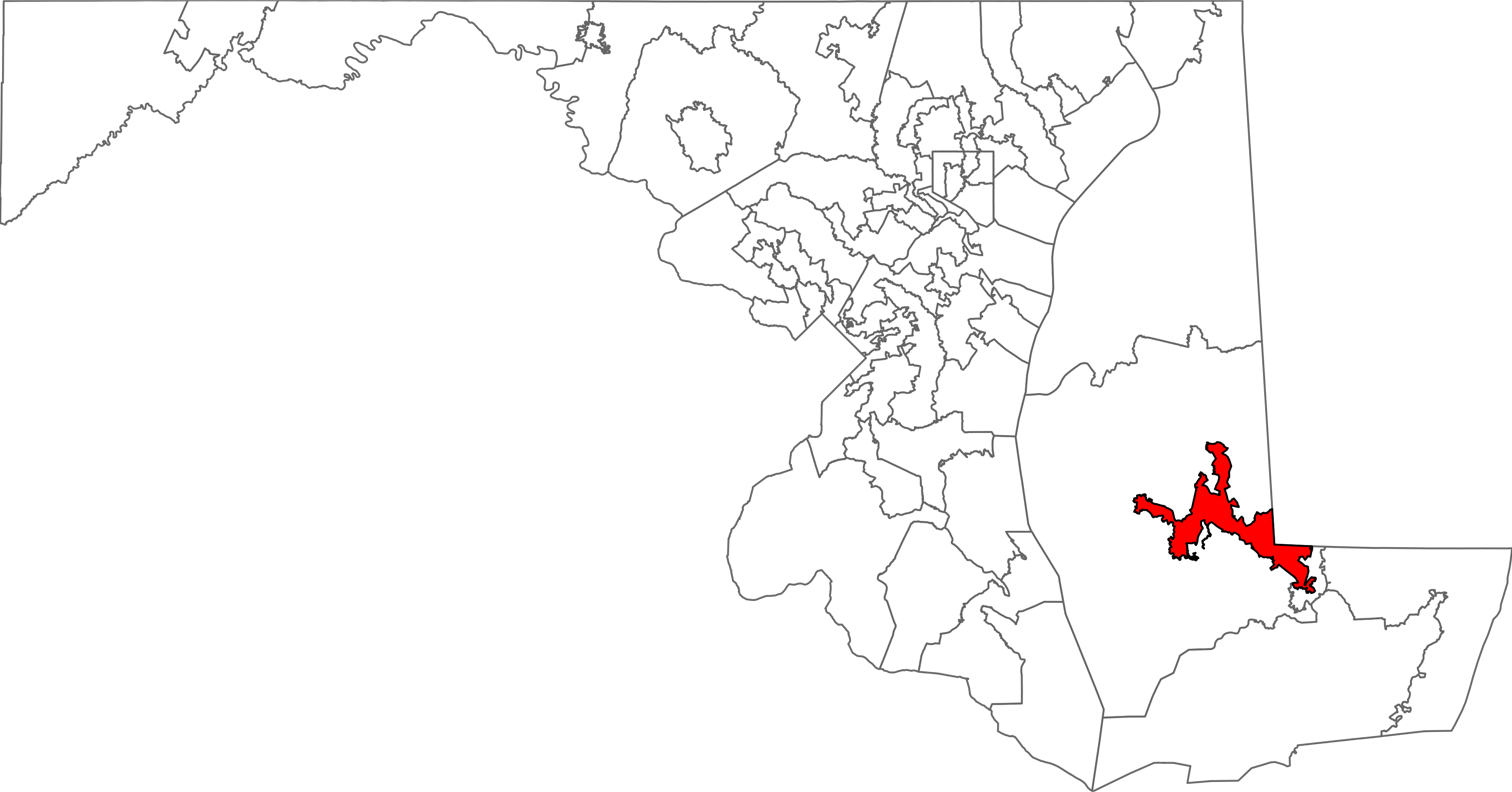
- Delegate(s): Sheree Sample-Hughes (D)
- Registration: 60.4% Democratic; 21.1% Republican; 16.9% unaffiliated
- Demographics: 34.0% White; 52.8% Black/African American; 0.5% Native American; 1.4% Asian; 0.0% Hawaiian/Pacific Islander; 4.6% Other race; 6.6% Two or more races; 8.4% Hispanic
- Population (2020): 43,123
- Voting-age population: 32,129
- Registered voters: 25,349

Maryland House of Delegates District 37A is one of the 71 districts that compose the Maryland House of Delegates. Along with subdistrict 37B, it makes up the 37th district of the Maryland Senate. District 37A includes parts of Dorchester and Wicomico counties, and is represented by one delegate.

== Demographic characteristics ==
As of the 2020 United States census, the district had a population of 43,123, of whom 32,129 (74.5%) were of voting age. The racial makeup of the district was 14,660 (34.0%) White, 22,766 (52.8%) African American, 237 (0.5%) Native American, 616 (1.4%) Asian, 10 (0.0%) Pacific Islander, 1,974 (4.6%) from some other race, and 2,860 (6.6%) from two or more races. Hispanic or Latino of any race were 3,611 (8.4%) of the population.

The district had 25,349 registered voters as of October 17, 2020, of whom 4,284 (16.9%) were registered as unaffiliated, 15,318 (60.4%) were registered as Democrats, 5,341 (21.1%) were registered as Republicans, and 243 (1.0%) were registered to other parties.

== Past Election Results ==
=== 2002 ===
Name	Party	Votes	Percent	Outcome
Rudolph C. Cane	Democratic	4,774	56.5%	Won
Doug Scott	Republican	3,673	43.4%	Lost
Other Write-Ins		9	0.1%	

=== 2006 ===
Name	Party	Votes	Percent	Outcome
Rudolph C. Cane	Democratic	7,405	98.7%	Won
Other Write-Ins		95	1.3%	

=== 2010 ===
Name	Party	Votes	Percent	Outcome
Rudolph C. Cane	Democratic	6,604	63.2%	Won
Dustin Mills	Republican	3,828	36.7%	Lost
Other Write-Ins		11	0.1%	

=== 2014 ===
Name	Party	Votes	Percent	Outcome
Sheree Sample-Hughes	Democratic	6,204	98.5%	Won
Other Write-Ins		94	1.5%	

=== 2018 ===
Name	Party	Votes	Percent	Outcome
Sheree Sample-Hughes	Democratic	7,462	68.5%	Won
Frank E. Cooke	Republican	3,413	31.3%	Lost
Other Write-Ins		15	0.1%	
