= Don B. Hughes =

American politician

Delegate Maryland District 37A
- In office 1995–1999
- Preceded by: Samuel Q. Johnson III
- Succeeded by: Rudolph C. Cane
- Constituency: Dorchester & Wicomico Counties

Personal details
- Born: September 22, 1940 (age 85) Salisbury, Maryland, United States
- Party: Republican

Don B. Hughes (born September 22, 1940) in Salisbury in Wicomico County, Maryland, United States, was a member of the Maryland House of Delegates for District 37A, which covers portions of Dorchester and Wicomico Counties

== Background ==
Delegate Hughes was first elected in 1994 and only served for 1 term. He did not run for reelection in the House.

== Education ==
Delegate Hughes attended Wicomico High School in Salisbury, Maryland. After high school he graduated from the University of Delaware in Newark, Delaware.

== Career ==
Delegate Hughes served on the Environmental Matters Committee during his term in the Maryland House of Delegates. He was also a member of the forum for Rural Maryland, the Lead Poisoning Prevention Commission from 1996 until 1998, the Governor's Wetlands Restoration Steering Committee from 1997 until 1999, and finally the Solid Waste Management Task Force in 1998.

== Election results ==
- 1994 Race for Maryland House of Delegates – District 37A

Voters to choose one:

Name	Votes	Percent	Outcome
Don B. Hughes, Rep.	2,788	41%	Won
Rudolph C. Cane, Dem.	2,768	40%	Lost
Lemuel D. Chester II, Ind.	1,299	19%	Lost
