= Tom Hutchinson (politician) =

American politician (born 1965)

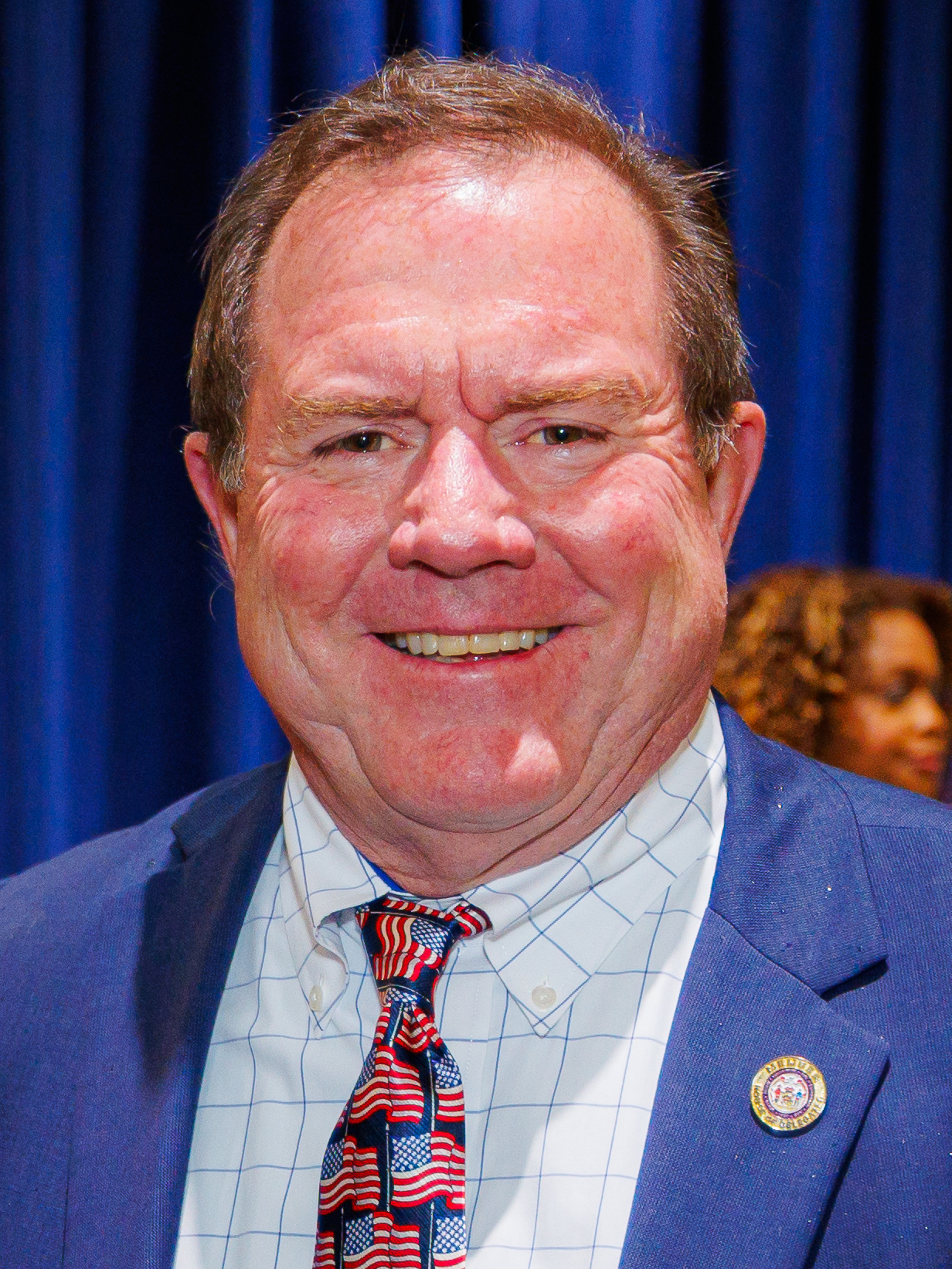
- Hutchinson in 2025

Member of the Maryland House of Delegates from the 37B district
- Incumbent
- Assumed office January 11, 2023 Serving with Christopher T. Adams
- Preceded by: Johnny Mautz

Personal details
- Born: May 25, 1965 (age 61) Cape May, New Jersey, U.S.
- Party: Republican
- Spouse: Lynn Dymond (divorced)
- Children: 1
- Profession: Small business owner
- Website: Campaign website

Thomas "Tom" S. Hutchinson (born May 25, 1965) is an American politician, business owner, and triathlete. He is currently a member of the Maryland House of Delegates for District 37B.

== Background ==
Hutchinson graduated from Dickinson College with a Bachelor of Science degree in computer science. He later received a Master of Business Administration degree from Loyola University Maryland. He and his family purchased a home in Woolford, Maryland, in 2003, where they stayed weekends before moving there permanently in 2010.

In January 2014, Hutchinson was elected to serve as the president of Cambridge Main Street. During his tenure, downtown Cambridge experienced a re-emergence of restaurants, retail, beautification, and tourism. Hutchinson also collaborated with local officials and the World Triathlon Corporation to host a full distance Ironman Triathlon event in the county in 2014. He participated in the triathlon in 2017, coming in 732nd place out of 1,522 participants.

Since 2020, Hutchinson has run his own home improvement company, Hutchinson Home Services LLC.

In March 2022, Hutchinson announced his candidacy for the Maryland House of Delegates in District 37B, seeking to succeed state delegate Johnny Mautz, who had announced a run for the Maryland Senate. He ran on a slate with incumbent state delegate Christopher T. Adams, and won the Republican primary on July 19 with 35.4 percent of the vote and as the top vote-getter in Talbot and Dorchester counties.

== In the legislature ==
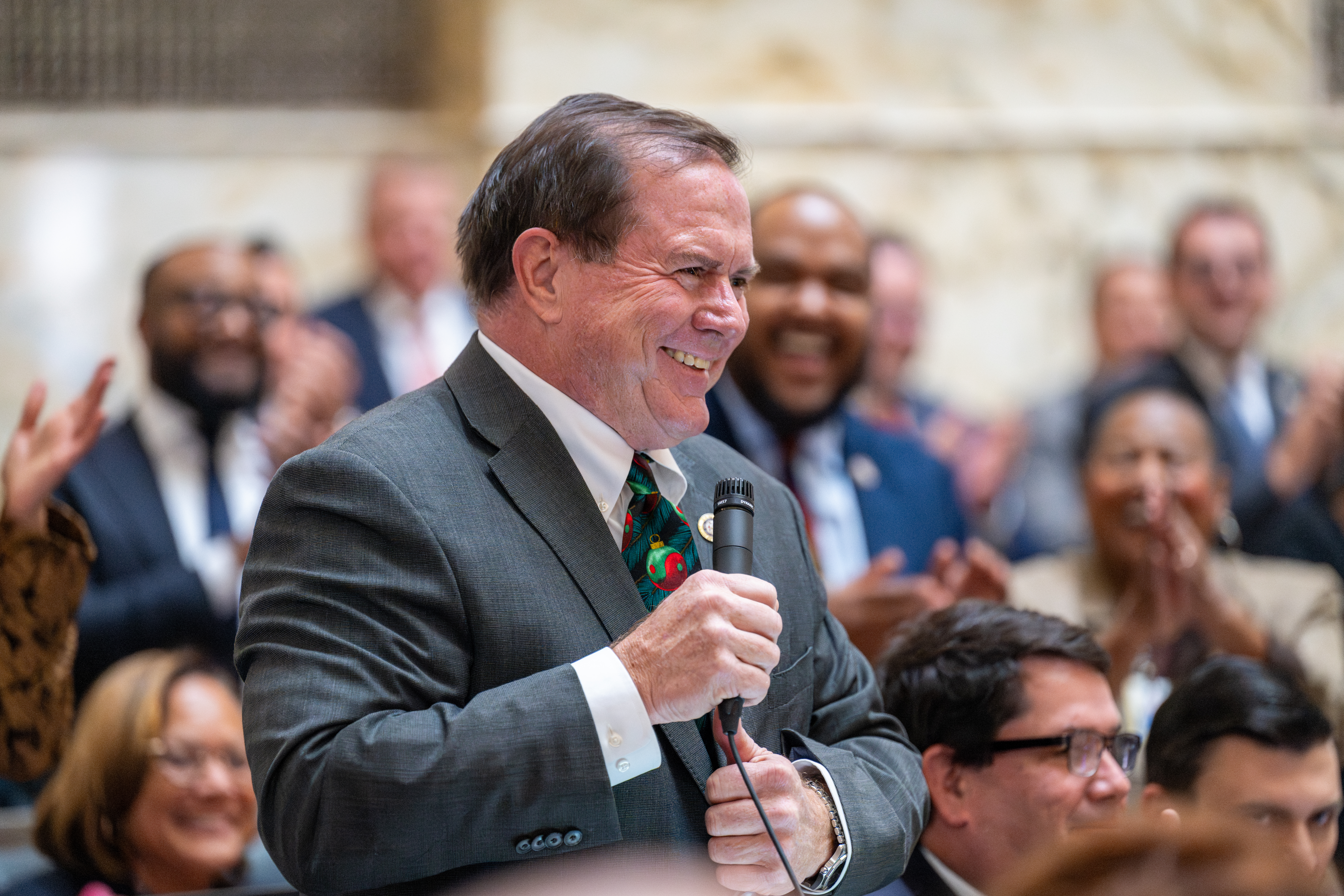
Hutchinson speaks on the House floor, 2025

Hutchinson was sworn into the Maryland House of Delegates on January 11, 2023. He is a member of the House Health and Government Operations Committee.

== Political positions ==
=== Crime ===
Hutchinson opposes Maryland's laws on juvenile justice. During the 2024 legislative session, he introduced a bill that would classify teacher and staff assaults by students as a crime of violence.

=== Energy ===
In December 2025, Hutchinson said he supported the expansion of nuclear power in Maryland.

=== Gun control ===
In May 2023, Hutchinson signed onto a letter calling on Governor Wes Moore to veto the Gun Safety Act, an omnibus gun control bill that increased requirements and fees to obtain a handgun permit, strengthened safe storage requirements, and prohibited carrying guns near certain locations.

=== Healthcare ===
During the 2026 legislative session, Hutchinson supported a bill that would require private health insurers to provide coverage for scalp cooling for cancer patients.

=== National politics ===
In April 2023, after former president Donald Trump was indicted in New York on charges of falsifying business records, Hutchinson suggested that Maryland's Republican voters "may be at a point where we have to look at all the [Republican presidential] candidates" and move on from Trump.

In December 2025, Hutchinson predicted that mid-decade redistricting efforts in Maryland would backfire in Republicans' favor, suggesting that a new map could elect two or three Republicans to Congress instead of just one. He criticized the process used by the Governor's Redistricting Advisory Commission that led to the introduction of a bill to redraw Maryland's congressional districts to improve the Democratic Party's chances of winning Maryland's 1st congressional district, the only congressional district represented by a Republican in the state.

During debate on a proposed constitutional amendment that would exempt Maryland's congressional districts from the redistricting guidelines in the state Constitution in August 2026, Hutchinson introduced an amendment that would require nine Eastern Shore counties to vote on seceding from Maryland and forming a new state called Mardelva. The amendment was rejected by voice vote. In an interview with The Baltimore Sun following the special session, Hutchinson said that the secession amendment was symbolic, explaining that he never expected it to become law and wanted to make a point of Eastern Shore counties being disenfranchised by congressional redistricting.

== Personal life ==
Hutchinson was married to his wife, Lynn Dymond. They have since divorced. Together, they had a daughter named Helen.

== Electoral history ==
Maryland House of Delegates District 37B Republican primary election, 2022
Party	Candidate	Votes	%
Republican	Christopher T. Adams	6,472	35.4
Republican	Tom Hutchinson	6,032	33.0
Republican	Nicole L. Acle	4,292	23.5
Republican	Ron James	1,509	8.2

Maryland House of Delegates District 37B election, 2022
Party	Candidate	Votes	%
Republican	Christopher T. Adams	21,694	37.32
Republican	Tom Hutchinson	20,876	35.91
Democratic	Susan E. Delean-Botkin	15,344	26.39
Write-in		220	0.38
