= Michele Guyton =

American politician (born 1966)

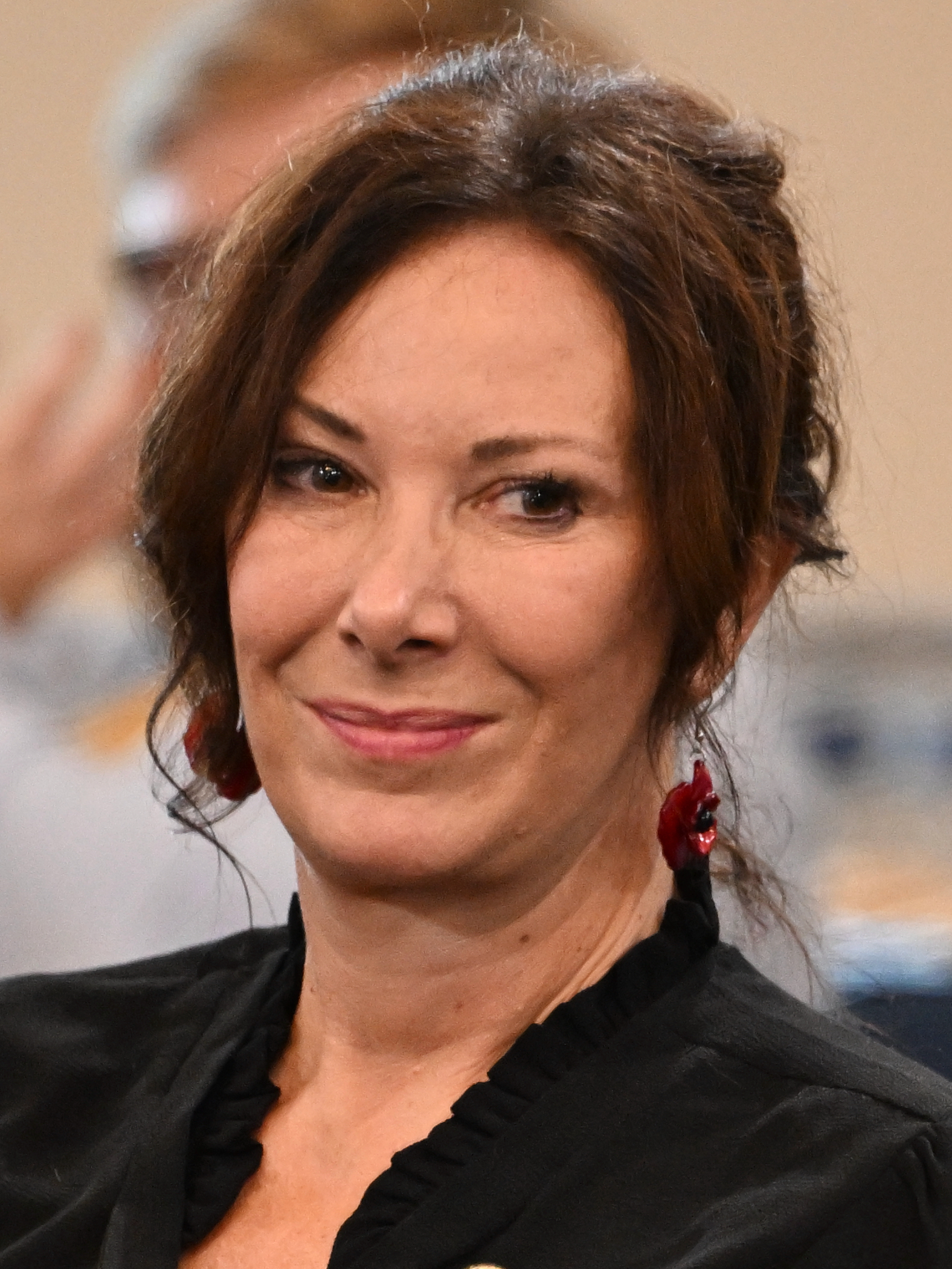
- Guyton in 2024

Member of the Maryland House of Delegates from the 42B district
- Incumbent
- Assumed office January 9, 2019
- Preceded by: Susan L. M. Aumann

Personal details
- Born: October 19, 1966 (age 59) Madison, Tennessee, U.S.
- Party: Democratic
- Children: 3
- Education: Vanderbilt University (BA); Radcliffe College (MA); Brandeis University (MA, PhD)

Michele Jenkins Guyton (born October 19, 1966) is an American politician from the Democratic Party and is a member of the Maryland House of Delegates representing District 42B.

== Background ==
Guyton was born on October 19, 1966, in Madison, Tennessee. She attended Baldwin County High School in Bay Minette, Alabama and received her B.A. in psychology and anthropology from Vanderbilt University in 1989. She later jointly earned an MA in women studies from Radcliffe College of Harvard University as part of the Boston-area Graduate Consortium for Women’s Studies, alongside an MA in psychology from Brandeis University. Guyton also possesses a Ph.D. in developmental and social psychology from Brandeis, which she received in 1996.

In 2015, Governor Larry Hogan appointed Guyton to serve on the Maryland State Board of Education. The Maryland Senate approved her nomination in a 42-0 vote. She served on the board until January 1, 2019, when she resigned to become a state delegate.

In January 2018, at the Baltimore Women's March, Guyton announced her intent to run for state delegate, citing the 2016 presidential election as what motivated her to run for office. During the primary, she enjoyed endorsements from various organizations, including the Maryland League of Conservation Voters, Metro Baltimore Council AFL–CIO, NARAL Pro-Choice Maryland, and the LiUNA Mid-Atlantic Region, and state senator James Brochin. She received 48.4 percent of the vote in the 2022 Democratic primary and narrowly defeated Republican Tim Robinson in the general election with 26.5 percent of the vote. Mileah Kromer, a political scientist and pollster at Goucher College, suggested that Guyton's primary win indicated a polarized electorate in Maryland's 42nd district.

Guyton is a developmental psychologist and disabilities advocate who has worked at various institutions relating to psychology, including the University of Iowa, the North Carolina Department of Mental Health, and the Kennedy Krieger Institute. Her three sons all have disabilities, which moved her to co-found a support group for families with disabilities that has since evolved into the Mid-Atlantic chapter of the Tourette Association of America. She has also used her position as state delegate to introduce several pieces of legislation that would support disabled Marylanders.

== In the legislature ==
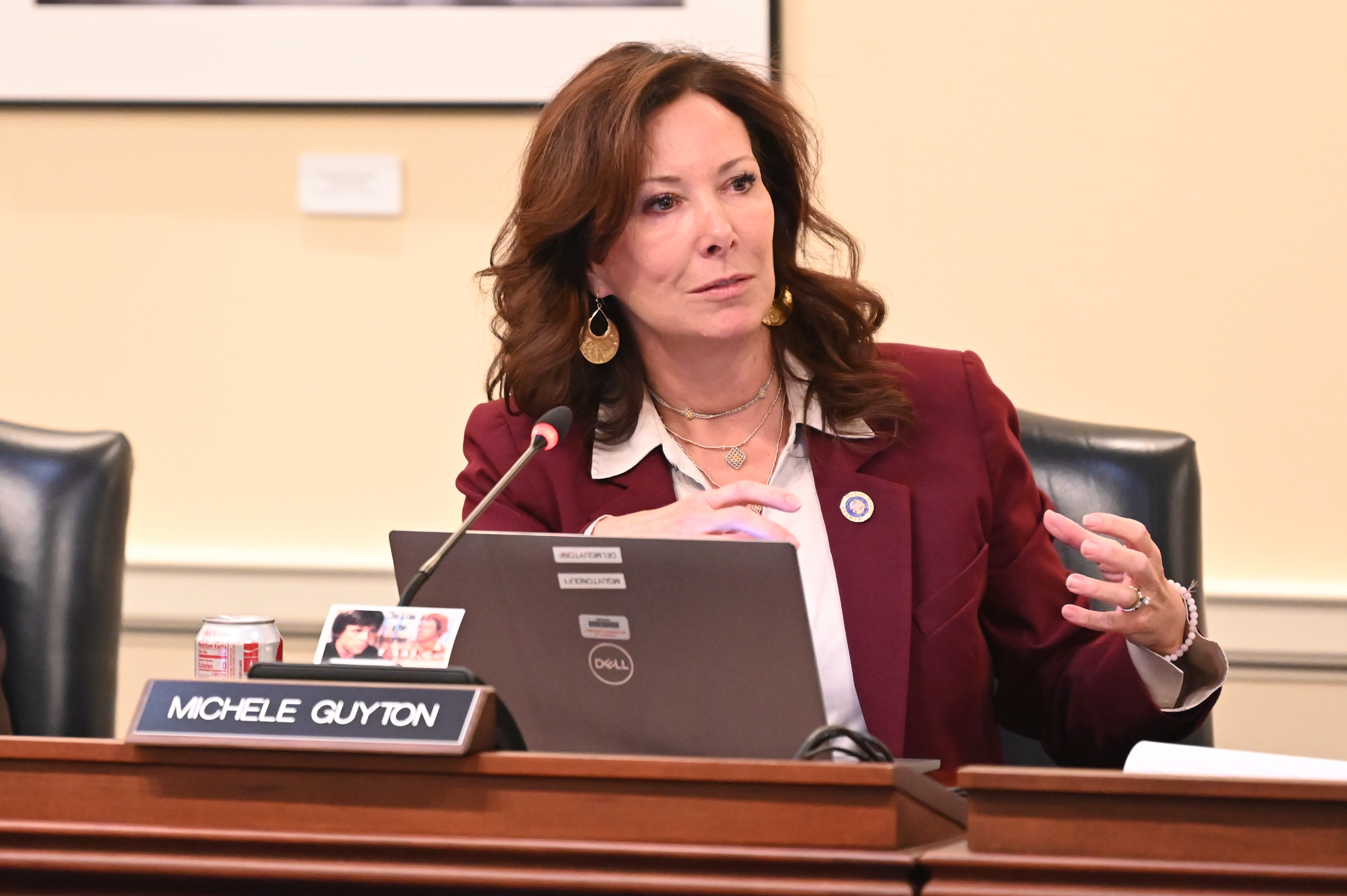
Guyton in the Environment and Transportation Committee, 2024

Guyton was sworn in as a member of the House of Delegates on January 9, 2019. She was floated as a potential candidate for Maryland Senate in 2022. Unopposed in the Democratic primary, Guyton was reelected in the 2022 general election by a more than 20% margin.

Guyton was a member of the Ways and Means Committee from 2019 to 2025, after which House Speaker Joseline Peña-Melnyk named her as the vice chair of the Environment and Transportation Committee. Guyton is also a member of the Women's Legislators of Maryland Caucus and the Maryland Legislative Transit Caucus.

== Political positions ==
Guyton is a self-described progressive Democrat, but has expressed that she will work across the aisle to support good ideas "regardless of who is sponsoring them."

=== Education ===
Guyton supports universal pre-kindergarten, boosting mental health supports in schools and improving teacher-student ratios in classrooms.

=== Guns ===
In February 2020, Guyton joined seven Democratic delegates in voting against a bill that would mandate background checks on private sales and transfers of shotguns and rifles.

=== Healthcare ===
Guyton supports expanding access to healthcare, saying that she "believes it really is a human right" and that single-payer healthcare is worth discussing but would have to be paid for.

=== Minimum wage ===
On the campaign trail, Guyton advocated for the legislature to pass a "$15 an hour living wage with future indexed increases." In March 2019, she was one of two Democrats in the Maryland House of Delegates to vote against a bill that would raise the minimum wage to $15 an hour.

=== Taxes ===
Guyton opposes raising new taxes, instead advocating for redirecting priorities and using funding sources like lottery money and the legalization of marijuana.

== Electoral history ==
Maryland House of Delegates District 42B Democratic Primary Election, 2018
Party	Candidate	Votes	%
Democratic	Michele Guyton	5,652	48
Democratic	Sachin Hebbar	3,293	28
Democratic	Daniel Nemec	2,744	24

Maryland House of Delegates District 42B Democratic Primary Election, 2018
Party	Candidate	Votes	%
Republican	Nino Mangione	20,267	29
Democratic	Michele Guyton	18,815	27
Republican	Tim Robinson	18,090	26
Democratic	Sachin Hebbar	13,670	19
Other/Write-in	Other/Write-in	53	0
