= Rudolph C. Cane =

American politician (1934–2024)

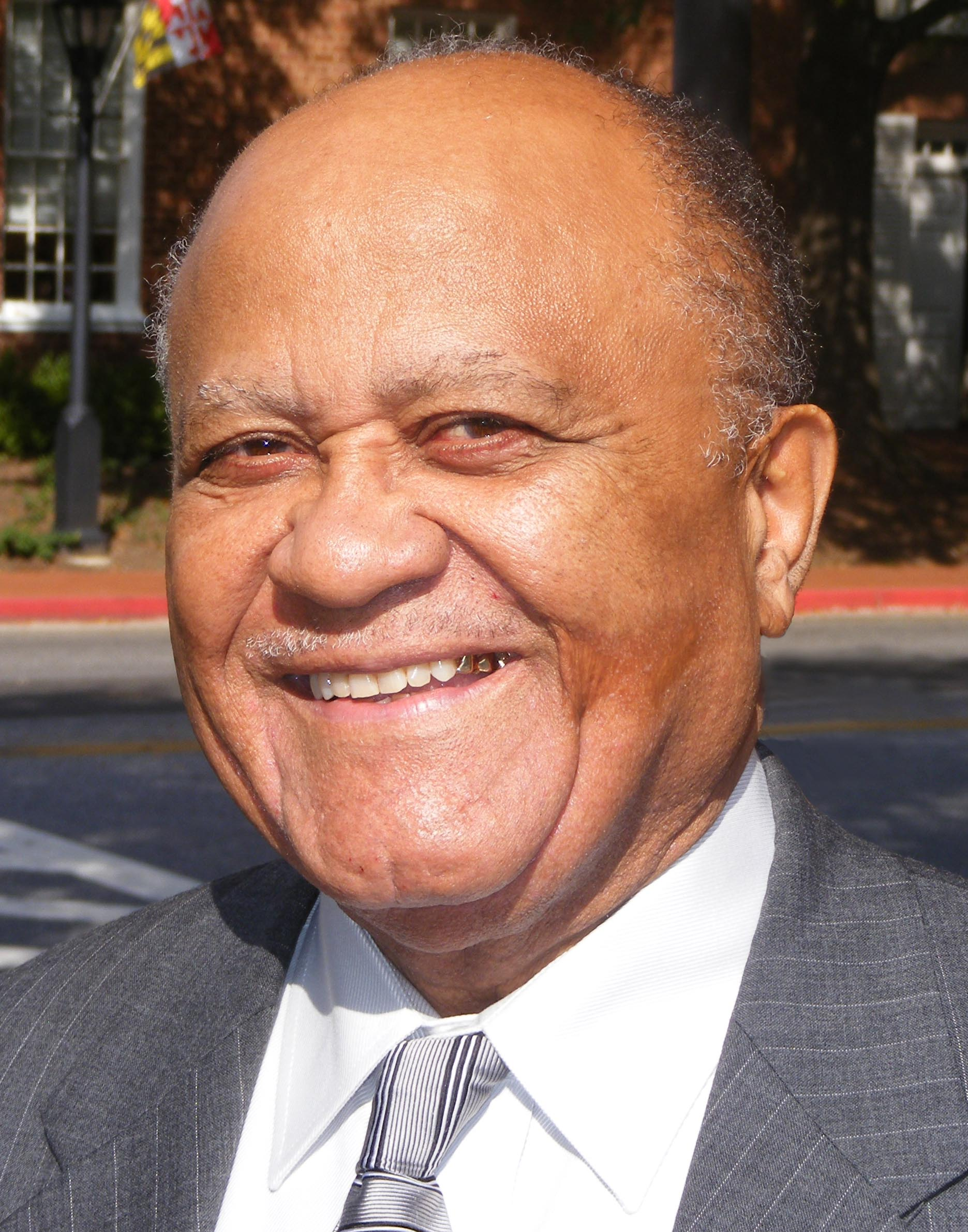

Member of the Maryland House of Delegates from the 37A district
- In office January 13, 1999 – January 14, 2015
- Preceded by: Don B. Hughes
- Succeeded by: Sheree Sample-Hughes

Member of the Wicomico County Council
- In office 1990–1994

Personal details
- Born: May 23, 1934 Marion, Maryland, U.S.
- Died: January 20, 2024 (aged 89)
- Party: Democratic
- Spouse: Louella Fitchett
- Children: Dr. Rudolph Cane, Jr. and Dr. Renee Cane McCoy

Rudolph C. Cane (May 23, 1934 – January 20, 2024) was an American politician and member of the Democratic Party. He represented District 37A in the Maryland House of Delegates for 15 years before retiring in 2014. He was the first African American to represent the Eastern Shore in the Maryland House of Delegates. Cane was also a chairman of the Legislative Black Caucus of Maryland.

== Background ==
Rudolph Cane was born on May 23, 1934, in Marion, Maryland. He graduated from Carter G. Woodson High School in Crisfield, Maryland, in 1952. He entered the United States Army right after high school and served as a radar specialist earning the rank of sergeant by the time of his honorable discharge in 1955. After his military service he pursued undergraduate studies at Maryland State College from 1956 to 1957 and Coppin State College from 1964 to 1968.

== In the legislature ==
A member of House of Delegates from January 13, 1999, to January 2015, Cane most recently served on the House Environmental Matters Committee and its environment, its natural resources and its land use & ethics subcommittees. He was chairman of the committee's agriculture, agriculture preservation & open space subcommittee.

=== Legislative notes ===
- Voted for the Clean Indoor Air Act of 2007 (HB359)
- Voted in favor of increasing the sales tax to 6% - Tax Reform Act of 2007(HB2)
- Voted in favor of in-state tuition for illegal immigrants in 2007 (HB6)
- Sponsored House Bill 30 in 2007, allowing the state to confiscate unused portions of gift certificates after four years.

== Personal life and death ==
In December 2015, Cane reportedly suffered a stroke. He died on January 20, 2024, at the age of 89.
