= Johnny Mautz =

American politician (born 1970)

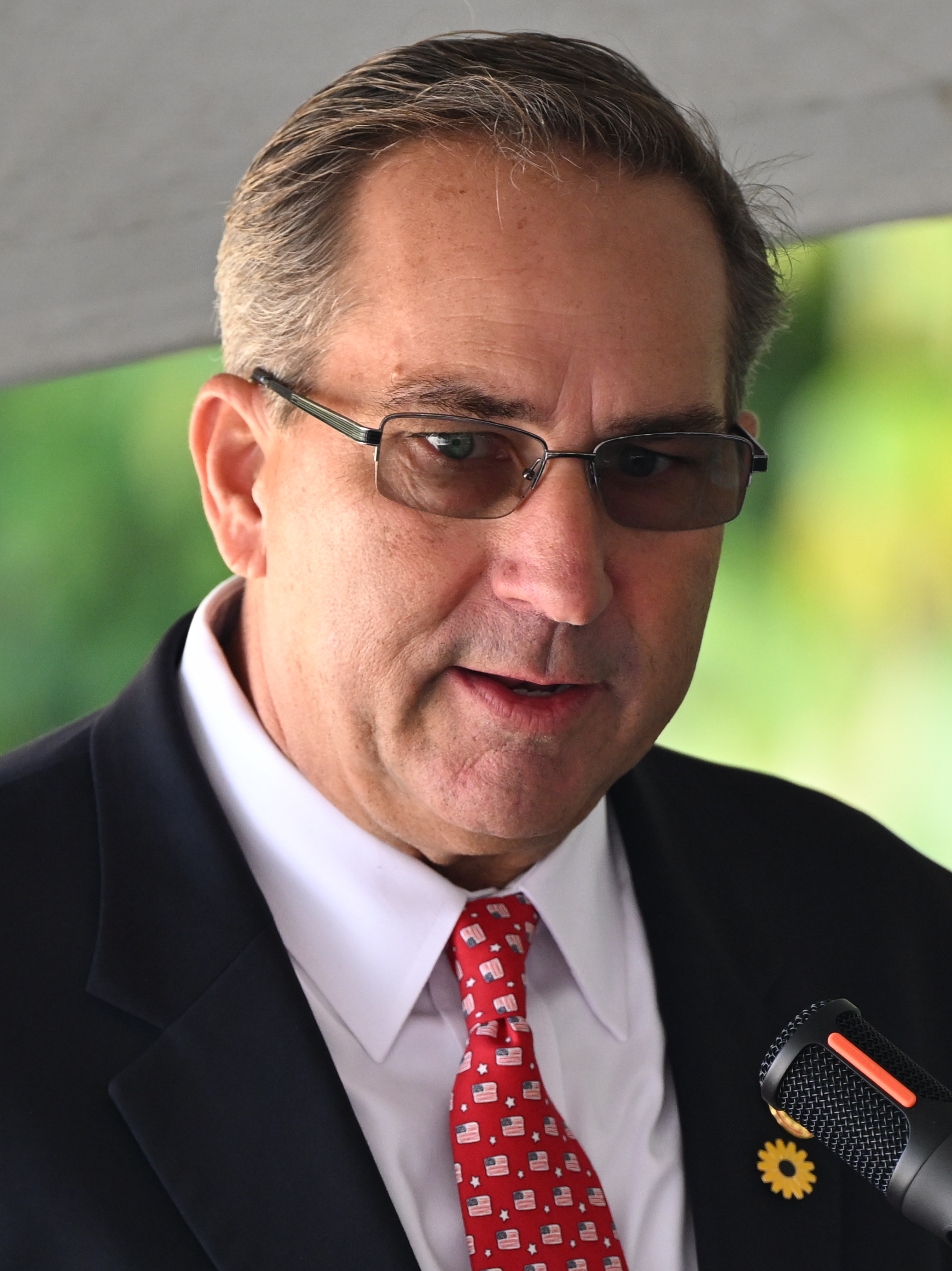
- Mautz in 2025

Member of the Maryland Senate from the 37th district
- Incumbent
- Assumed office January 11, 2023
- Preceded by: Adelaide Eckardt

Member of the Maryland House of Delegates from the 37B district
- In office January 14, 2015 – January 11, 2023
- Preceded by: Adelaide Eckardt; Jeannie Haddaway-Riccio
- Succeeded by: Tom Hutchinson

Personal details
- Born: John Frederick Mautz IV; September 19, 1970 (age 55) Fort Devens, Massachusetts, U.S.
- Party: Republican
- Spouse: Rebecca Shoap (m. 2005, divorced)
- Children: 2
- Profession: Attorney, business owner
- Website: Campaign website Official website

John Frederick "Johnny" Mautz IV (born September 19, 1970) is an American politician who has served as a member of the Maryland Senate from District 37 since 2023. A member of the Republican Party, he previously represented District 37B in the Maryland House of Delegates from 2015 to 2023.

== Personal life and career ==
Mautz was born at Fort Devens in Massachusetts, to father John Mautz and mother Diana Mautz. His father was stationed at Fort Devens before moving to the Eastern Shore of Maryland to start a dental care company. He graduated from Brewster Academy, and received a B.A. degree in political science from the University of Dayton in 1994 and a J.D. degree from the Claude W. Pettit College of Law at Ohio Northern University in 1997.

Before serving in the Maryland House of Delegates, Mautz served as a counsel on the United States House Committee on the Judiciary from 1997 to 2002. Afterwards, he served as a Special Assistant to the Deputy Chief of Staff for Governor Bob Ehrlich from 2002 to 2005, and as legislative director for U.S. Representative Howard Coble from 2009 to 2014.

Mautz married his wife, Rebecca (née Shoap), in May 2005; they are now separated. They have two children. Mautz owns the Carpenter Street Saloon in Saint Michaels, Maryland.

== In the legislature ==
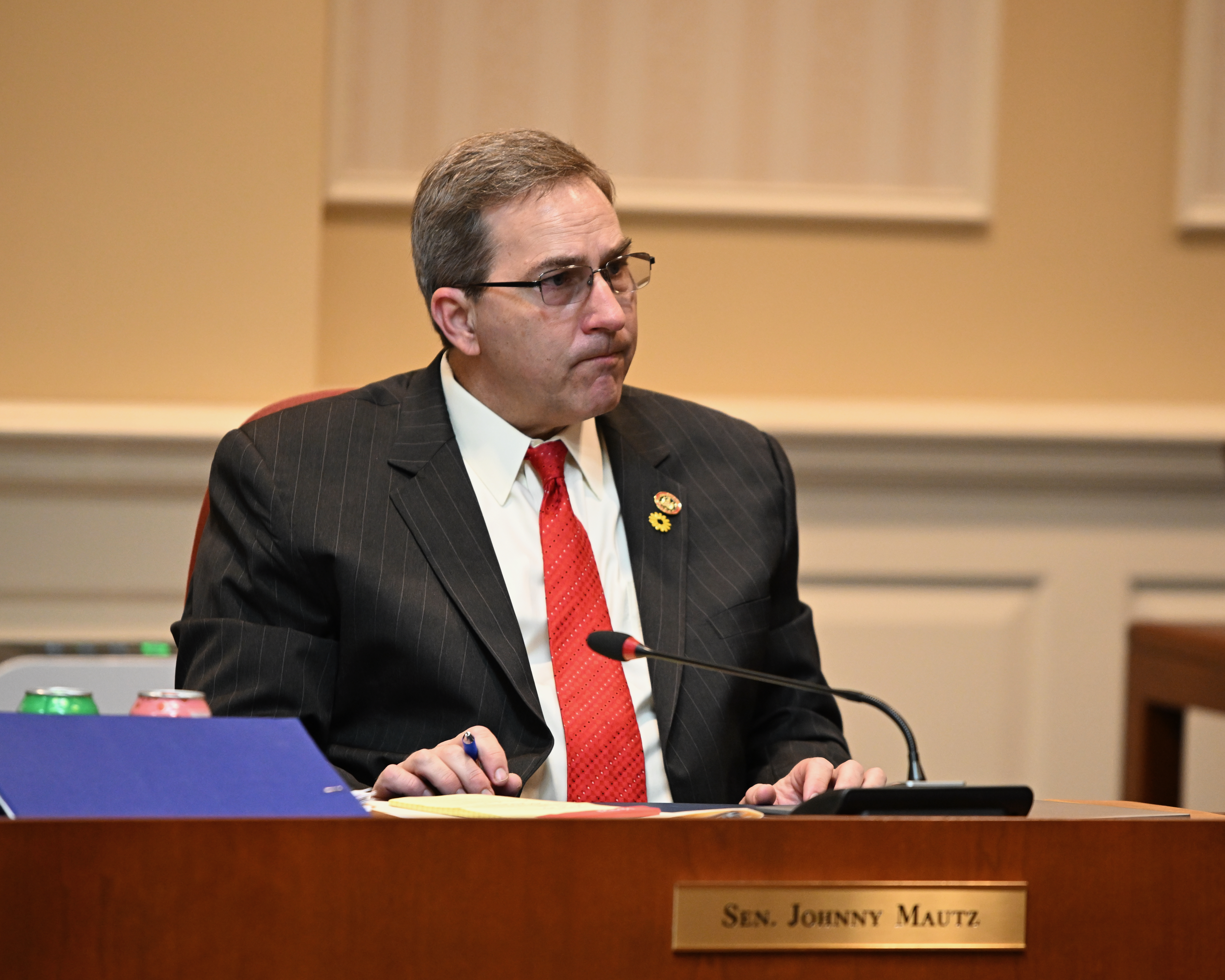
Mautz in the Senate Finance Committee, 2023

Mautz was elected to the House of Delegates in 2014, succeeding delegates Adelaide Eckardt and Jeannie Haddaway-Riccio. He was sworn in on January 14, 2015, and was a member of the Economic Matters Committee.

During the 2016 Republican Party presidential primaries, Mautz supported businessman Donald Trump.

In February 2022, after much speculation, Mautz filed to run for Maryland Senate, challenging incumbent state Senator Adelaide Eckardt in the primary. He defeated Eckardt in the Republican primary on July 19, and won the general election on November 8, 2022. Mautz was sworn in on January 11, 2023, and is a member of the Finance Committee.

== Political positions ==
=== Crime ===
In March 2022, during debate on a bill to ban privately made firearms, Mautz introduced an amendment to create a special unit on firearm violence in Baltimore. The amendment was rejected in a 41-88 vote.

During the 2023 legislative session, Mautz supported legislation to increase penalties for gun crimes, pointing to the murder of Wicomico County Sheriff's Deputy Glenn Hilliard in June 2022, which involved an illegal firearm. He also added that he would support reinstating the death penalty for murdering law enforcement officers. Mautz later called for Governor Wes Moore to call a special legislative session on gun violence following the 2023 Baltimore shooting.

=== Economic issues ===
During the 2019 legislative session, Mautz voted against a bill to raise the minimum wage to $15 an hour by 2025, which he worried was "too aggressive" of an increase for Eastern Shore business owners.

In 2021, during debate on a bill allowing counties to implement progressive income taxes, Mautz introduced an amendment that would require any income tax increases to be subject to a countywide referendum. The amendment was rejected by a 42-94 vote.

In 2022, Mautz voted against a bill to implement a statewide paid family leave program.

=== Environment ===
In May 2024, Mautz called on Governor Wes Moore to veto a bill increasing subsidies for offshore wind energy. The bill was signed into law by Governor Moore that following week. In April 2026, Mautz was one of four senators to vote against the Utility RELIEF Act, citing the failure of a proposed Republican amendment to the bill that would have cut the state's renewable energy goals.

=== Hunting and fishing ===
In March 2017, Mautz voted against a bill to ban harvesting in oyster sanctuaries. In January 2020, Mautz voted against overriding Governor Larry Hogan's veto on House Bill 720, which establishes a consensus-based process involving environmentalists, watermen and seafood sellers to create a new oyster fishery management plan for the state, citing concerns that the bill could cause economic harm to communities on the Chesapeake Bay.

During the 2018 legislative session, Mautz introduced a bill to provide a tax break to individuals who donate venison to food programs. The bill passed and was signed into law by Governor Hogan.

In July 2023, Mautz called for federal tariffs on imported crab meat, claiming that Venezuelan crab meat was hurting local crab fisheries.

During the 2024 legislative session, Mautz introduced a bill prohibiting the Maryland Department of Natural Resources from reducing or altering oyster sanctuaries' boundaries. The legislation would also authorize watermen to use power dredges to cultivate oyster growth in the Chesapeake Bay. The bill passed and was signed into law by Governor Wes Moore.

In January 2026, Mautz urged Governor Moore to request federal disaster assistance for the 2026 Potomac River sewage spill, which he said was impacting Maryland's commercial oyster fishing industry.

=== Immigration ===
In March 2021, Mautz voted against the Maryland Driver Privacy Act, which would prohibit state and local government agencies from providing records or data to U.S. Immigration and Customs Enforcement (ICE) for the purpose of civil immigration enforcement, insisting that the bill extended extra protections to undocumented immigrants with drivers' licenses. During the 2026 legislative session, he opposed a bill that would prohibit ICE officers hired during the second Trump administration from becoming Maryland law enforcement officers and another bill that would require ICE to present a judicial warrant to hold someone in a state or local correctional facility.

=== Gun policy ===
In April 2018, Mautz voted in favor of House Bill 888, which restricts the sale and possession of bump stocks, and House Bill 1302, which authorizes a person to petition for an extreme risk prevention order with a court or law enforcement agency when it may be determined that a person is either an extreme risk to himself or to others. Following the vote, Mautz issued a written apology to his constituents, saying that he had not read the bills and intended to vote against them. Governor Hogan would sign HB 1302 into law, but vetoed HB 888.

In 2019, Mautz said he opposed bills to further regulate long gun and assault rifles, imploring legislators to instead pass legislation focusing on the mental health of gun owners.

During the 2023 legislative session, Mautz introduced an amendment to the Gun Safety Act, a gun control bill that increased requirements to obtain a handgun permit and limited where guns could be publicly carried, to protect armed civilians responding to a threat against another person from criminal charges under the bill. The amendment was rejected in a 19-27 vote. He later called the bill "unconstitutional" and supported the National Rifle Association of America's lawsuit against it.

In August 2026, during debate on a proposed constitutional amendment on redistricting, Mautz introduced an amendment that would codify the Second Amendment in the Constitution of Maryland.

=== Redistricting ===
In January 2026, Mautz said he supported a mid-decade redistricting of Maryland's legislative districts to add more districts on the Eastern Shore of Maryland, saying that "when the eastern shore votes unanimously against something, and it passes overwhelmingly, that is a problem, and it's not the way it is supposed to be". He opposed the process used by the Governor's Redistricting Advisory Commission to gather feedback on proposed congressional redistricting plans, calling it "deceiving" and criticizing it for not holding any in-person meetings.

=== Social issues ===
In March 2018, Mautz voted against the Reform on Tap Act of 2018, which would have repealed certain limits on micro-breweries, farm breweries, and limited beer wholesalers.

In 2023, Mautz introduced an amendment to the Trans Health Equity Act that would ban gender-affirming care for minors. The amendment was rejected in a 14-29 vote.

== Electoral history ==
Maryland House of Delegates District 37B Republican primary election, 2014
Party	Candidate	Votes	%
Republican	Johnny Mautz	5,896	35.8
Republican	Christopher T. Adams	4,030	24.5
Republican	Rene Desmarais	3,082	18.7
Republican	Karen Tolley	1,850	11.2
Republican	Allen Nelson	1,604	9.7

Maryland House of Delegates District 37B election, 2014
Party	Candidate	Votes	%
Republican	Johnny Mautz	21,057	39.8
Republican	Christopher T. Adams	16,046	30.3
Democratic	Keasha N. Haythe	7,957	15.0
Democratic	Rodney Benjamin	7,852	14.8
Write-in		27	0.1

Maryland House of Delegates District 37B election, 2018
Party	Candidate	Votes	%
Republican	Johnny Mautz (incumbent)	25,031	43.6
Republican	Christopher T. Adams (incumbent)	19,498	33.9
Democratic	Dan O'Hare	12,796	22.3
Write-in		128	0.2

Maryland Senate District 37 Republican primary election, 2022
Party	Candidate	Votes	%
Republican	Johnny Mautz	10,128	74.1
Republican	Adelaide C. Eckardt (incumbent)	3,535	25.9

Maryland Senate District 37 election, 2022
Party	Candidate	Votes	%
Republican	Johnny Mautz	29,432	60.8
Democratic	Naomi Hyman	18,930	39.1
Write-in		47	0.1
