= Sheree Sample-Hughes =

American politician (born 1977)

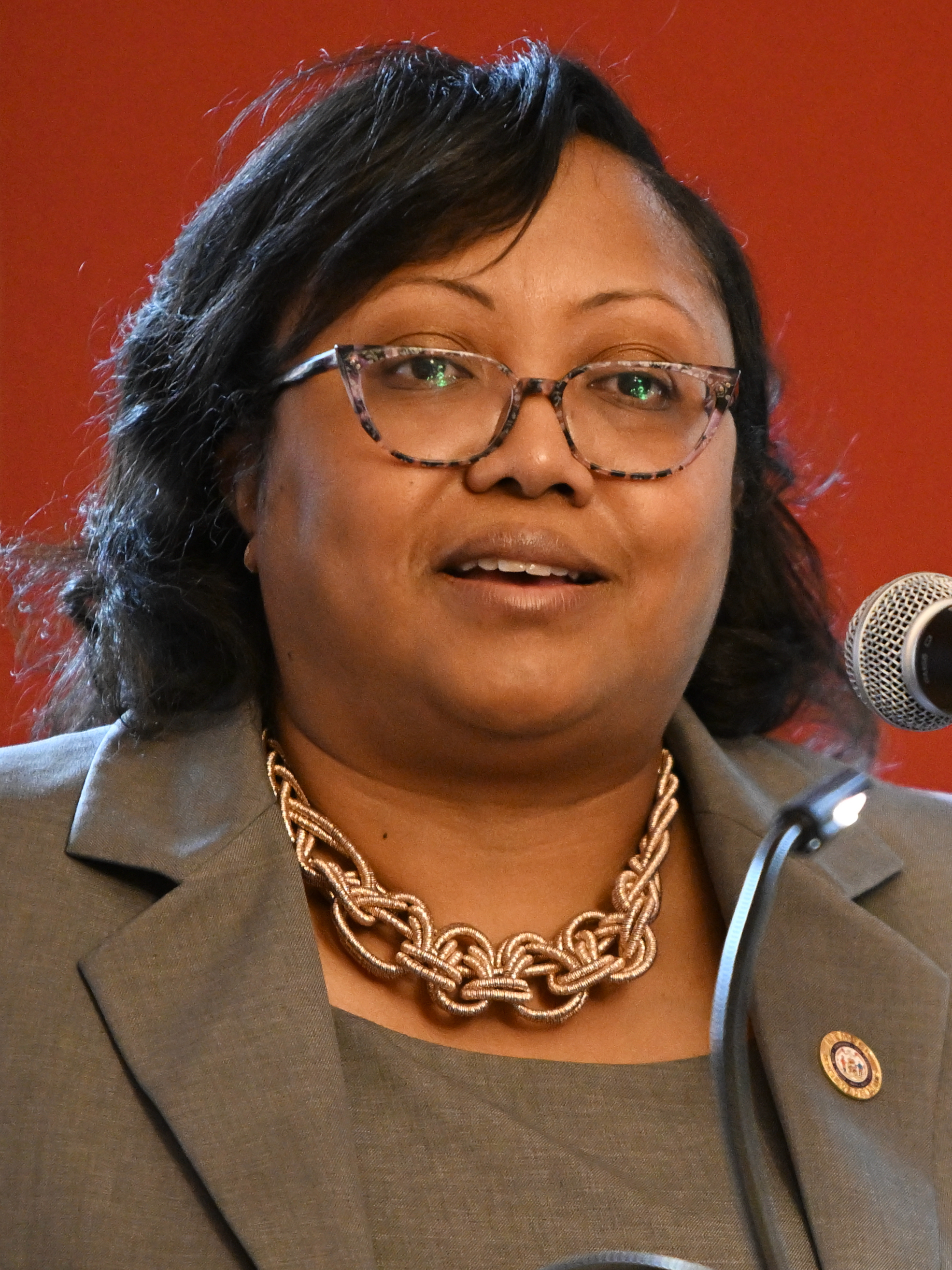

Speaker pro tempore of the Maryland House of Delegates
- In office September 9, 2019 – January 10, 2024
- Preceded by: Adrienne A. Jones
- Succeeded by: Dana Stein

Member of the Maryland House of Delegates from the 37A district
- Incumbent
- Assumed office January 14, 2015
- Preceded by: Rudolph C. Cane

Member of the Wicomico County Council from the 1st district
- In office December 5, 2006 – December 2, 2014
- Preceded by: Ed Taylor
- Succeeded by: Ernest Davis

Personal details
- Born: September 13, 1977 (age 48)
- Party: Democratic
- Children: 2
- Education: Delaware State University (BA); Wilmington University (MPA)

Sheree L. Sample-Hughes (born September 13, 1977) is an American politician who since 2015 has served as a member of the Maryland House of Delegates representing legislative district 37A in Dorchester and Wicomico Counties on the Eastern Shore, centered around Salisbury. A member of the Democratic Party, she was the speaker pro tempore of the Maryland House of Delegates from 2019 to 2024.

== Early and personal life ==
Sample-Hughes was born on September 13, 1977. She grew up in Salisbury, Maryland, and attended Parkside High School. She went on to earn a bachelor's degree in public relations from Delaware State University in 1999, and a master's degree in public administration from Wilmington University in 2014. Sample-Hughes is a member of the Alpha Kappa Alpha sorority.

== Political career ==
=== Early career ===
Sample-Hughes first got involved in public service as an affordable housing coordinator for Pocomoke City, where she worked until 2000 when she became a special events coordinator for the Governor's Office on Service and Volunteerism. From 2002 to 2004, she served as the president of her local American Legion Post.

In 2006, Sample-Hughes was elected to the Wicomico County Council in District 1, which encompasses northern parts of Wicomico County and the city of Salisbury. She was the first African-American woman to serve on the county council. Sample-Hughes was also appointed as a member of the Maryland Commission on Correctional Standards, which she served as the vice chair of from 2010 to 2014.

=== Maryland House of Delegates ===
In 2014, Sample-Hughes was encouraged by incumbent state delegate Rudolph C. Cane to run for the Maryland House of Delegates in District 37A, succeeding him as his health declined. She ran unopposed in the primary and general elections after Cane withdrew his candidacy. Sample-Hughes was sworn into the Maryland House of Delegates on January 14, 2015. She served as a member of the Health and Government Operations Committee until 2022, when she was moved to the Economic Matters Committee. Since 2019, Sample-Hughes has been the only Democrat and the only person of color to represent the Eastern Shore of Maryland in the Maryland General Assembly.

From 2018 to 2019, Sample-Hughes served as the president of the Maryland Women's Legislative Caucus, becoming the first African-American to chair the caucus. In this position, she supported legislation to support female veterans and the elderly, and victims of workplace harassment and rape.

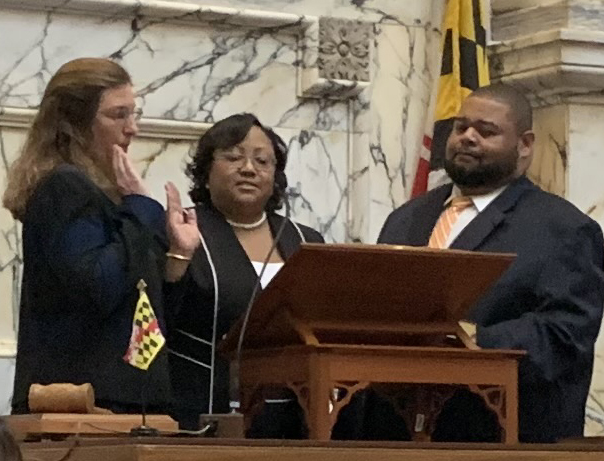
Sample-Hughes being sworn in as Speaker Pro Tempore

In September 2019, House Speaker Adrienne A. Jones named Sample-Hughes as speaker pro tempore, succeeding her following her election as speaker. She was elected to this position by the Maryland House of Delegates in January 2020. In May 2023, following votes against several bills backed by Democratic leaders of the legislature, Jones said she would not renominate Sample-Hughes as speaker pro tempore during the 2024 legislative session, instead nominating delegate Dana Stein. Jones said that the decision to select a different speaker pro tempore was not a personal decision, but instead part of a general post-election restructuring of leadership. She had also offered Sample-Hughes a senior leadership position, which she declined. Sample-Hughes later said that Jones removed her from her position as speaker pro tempore in response to her decision to vote against party lines.

In the 2020 presidential election, Sample-Hughes voted as an elector in Maryland's 1st congressional district. She was a delegate to the 2024 Democratic National Convention, pledged to Kamala Harris.

During the 2025 legislative session, Sample-Hughes joined all Republicans in voting against the state's budget. In explaining why she voted against it on the House floor, she said that she felt "like I don't have a place here anymore", referenced Governor William Donald Schaefer's "shithouse" remarks, and that the budget would disproportionately impact counties on the Eastern Shore due to cuts to program to support rural communities and funding mandates set by the Blueprint for Maryland's Future. In an interview with WBOC-TV following her speech, Sample-Hughes predicted that she would face retaliation for voting against the budget, but said that "I'm going to continue to be me. I'm not going to change who I am".

== Political positions ==
In November 2018, Sample-Hughes described herself as "a more traditional Democrat", pointing to a divide between herself and progressive members of the legislature. In February 2026, she described herself as a conservative Democrat. Sample-Hughes has cited Barbara Mikulski as her political role model.

=== Education ===
Sample-Hughes supports increasing funding for school construction projects and increasing personnel pay. She has expressed concerns about Eastern Shore counties' ability to implement the Blueprint for Maryland's Future reforms, which she supports.

In 2015, Sample-Hughes expressed apprehension with proposal to adopt an elected school board in Wicomico County, saying that she worried that the school board would not accurately represent the county's diversity.

During the 2023 legislative session, Sample-Hughes voted against a bill that would require teachers to go through virtual education training. Sample-Hughes supported an unsuccessful amendment to the bill that would have allowed Eastern Shore school systems to continue using a private company for contracting its virtual education services. She also introduced legislation to increase financial literacy classes in schools.

In February 2025, during debate on a bill that would require public schools to teach age-appropriate health education that included sexual orientation, family, and gender identity courses, Sample-Hughes was the only Democrat to vote for an amendment proposed by state delegate April Rose that would have allowed parents to opt their students out of gender and sexual orientation health education courses. She was also the only Democrat to vote against the bill.

=== Environment ===
In 2019, Sample-Hughes voted against a bill banning oyster harvesting in five Chesapeake Bay sanctuaries.

During the 2023 legislative session, Sample-Hughes voted in favor of the Promoting Offshore Wind Energy Resources Act, which would quadruple the state's offshore wind capacity by 2031. In March 2026, she supported the Utility RELIEF Act, but said that the legislature should have done more to provide relief to Maryland ratepayers. She also expressed support for various Republican amendments introduced to the bill.

=== Fiscal issues ===
During the 2023 legislative session, Sample-Hughes said she supported the Fair Wage Act of 2023, which would raise the minimum wage to $15 an hour by 2024, but opposed a provision that would index increases to the state's minimum wage to inflation, and later supported a committee amendment to remove this provision.

In April 2024, Sample-Hughes was the only Democratic member of the Maryland House of Delegates to vote against a bill that raised Maryland's tobacco tax and vehicle registration fees to pay for state transportation projects. In January 2025, she said she opposed tax increases to address the state's $3 billion budget deficit—noting the national economic landscape and suggesting that income tax increases on millionaires would cause wealthier individuals to move out of the state—instead preferring to cut funding for government agencies without burdening counties. She also supported proposals to eliminate the inheritance tax.

=== Gun control ===
During the 2018 legislative session, Sample-Hughes voted for red flag bills, which she described as a "tool that can be used to intervene in and prevent a crisis situation". During the 2023 legislative session, she voted against the Gun Safety Act of 2023, an omnibus gun control bill that increased requirements and fees to obtain a handgun permit, strengthened safe storage requirements, and prohibited carrying guns near certain locations. Sample-Hughes later questioned the legislation, claiming it would create "unnecessary challenges" when it comes to allowing people to legally carry guns.

=== Housing ===
During the 2018 legislative session, Sample-Hughes introduced legislation that would require landlords to give a 60-day notice before rent increases. The bill passed and was signed into law by Governor Larry Hogan.

=== Marijuana ===
During the 2015 legislative session, Sample-Hughes voted in favor of legislation to increase participation in the state's medical marijuana industry.

=== Paid family and sick leave ===
During the 2015 legislative session, Sample-Hughes supported a bill to require private employers to provide employees with accrued sick leave. In 2022, she supported legislation requiring businesses and workers to contribute to a state-run medical leave program.

=== Policing ===
In 2020, Speaker Adrienne A. Jones appointed Sample-Hughes to the Work Group to Address Police Reform and Accountability in Maryland. The work group released its recommendations in October, which included repealing the state's Law Enforcement Officers' Bill of Rights and regulating the types of force that police could use during arrests. These recommendations were incorporated into the Police Reform and Accountability Act, which Sample-Hughes voted in favor of during the 2021 legislative session.

In October 2020, Sample-Hughes expressed concern with proposed budget cuts by Governor Larry Hogan that would've required the Maryland State Police to close one of its helicopter bases, which she feared would affect public health and safety on the Eastern Shore. Hogan later announced that state officials would no longer consider closing one of the state police's helicopter bases.

=== Redistricting ===
In January 2026, Sample-Hughes said she opposed mid-decade redistricting in Maryland. She was the only Democrat to vote against the congressional redistricting plan proposed by the Governor's Redistricting Advisory Committee, which would redraw Maryland's 1st congressional district to improve the Democratic Party's chances of winning it, saying that she "wouldn't want anyone to silence my voice, and have had people who have attempted to do that". At the same time, she told The Baltimore Banner that it would be good if a Democrat could unseat U.S. representative Andy Harris, citing the actions of the second Trump administration and Republicans in Congress. In March 2026, after a bill requiring special elections to fill vacancies in the Maryland General Assembly was amended to add a constitutional referendum to clarify language around how Maryland's congressional districts could be drawn, Sample-Hughes voted for a Republican amendment to remove the newly-added referendum.

In August 2026, Sample-Hughes voted against a proposed constitution amendment that would exempt the state's congressional districts from the Constitution of Maryland's guidelines on redistricting, expressing concerns that if the referendum passed, a new congressional map would be adopted that results in less federal funding going toward rural communities on the Eastern Shore. She also argued that she did not see any perceived negative impacts by the second Trump administration to warrant redistricting guideline changes.

=== Social issues ===
In 2019, Sample-Hughes said she supported legislation to establish the Maryland Truth and Reconciliation Commission to document racially motivated lynchings in the state's history. During the 2021 legislative session, she introduced legislation to remove "Maryland, My Maryland" as the state's official anthem. The bill passed and was signed into law by Governor Hogan. Sample-Hughes later attended a rally in June 2021 to call for the removal of the Talbot Boys statue in Easton, which was the last Confederate monument on public land in Maryland.

During the 2022 legislative session, Sample-Hughes voted against the Trans Health Equity Act, which requires the state's Medicaid program to cover gender-affirming treatment. She voted against the bill again when it was reintroduced in 2023, and later said she opposed the bill because of her religious and personal beliefs.

== Personal life ==
Sample-Hughes is married to her husband, Desmond, and has two sons. She teaches at Wor-Wic Community College. In 2017, her son was involved in a serious incident that required him to be airlifted to the University of Maryland, Baltimore. Sample-Hughes attends services at the Wesley Temple United Methodist Church in Salisbury, Maryland.

== Electoral history ==
Wicomico County Council District 1 Democratic primary election, 2006
Party	Candidate	Votes	%
Democratic	Sheree Sample-Hughes	1,011	70.8
Democratic	Mac Hayward	417	29.2

Wicomico County Council District 1 election, 2006
Party	Candidate	Votes	%
Democratic	Sheree Sample-Hughes	3,525	99.4
Write-in		23	0.6

Wicomico County Council District 1 election, 2010
Party	Candidate	Votes	%
Democratic	Sheree Sample-Hughes	2,881	58.2
Republican	David Goslee Jr.	2,065	41.7
Write-in		1	0.0

Maryland House of Delegates District 37A Democratic primary election, 2014
Party	Candidate	Votes	%
Democratic	Sheree Sample-Hughes	1,938	100.0

Maryland House of Delegates District 37A election, 2014
Party	Candidate	Votes	%
Democratic	Sheree Sample-Hughes	6,204	98.5
Write-in		94	1.5

Maryland House of Delegates District 37A election, 2018
Party	Candidate	Votes	%
Democratic	Sheree Sample-Hughes (incumbent)	7,462	68.5
Republican	Frank E. Cooke	3,413	31.3
Write-in		15	0.1

Maryland House of Delegates District 37A election, 2022
Party	Candidate	Votes	%
Democratic	Sheree Sample-Hughes (incumbent)	5,841	61.9
Republican	Donna Bradshaw	3,573	37.9
Write-in		18	0.2

Maryland House of Delegates
Preceded by Adrienne A. Jones	Speaker pro tempore of the Maryland House of Delegates; 2019–2024	Succeeded by Dana Stein
