= Christopher T. Adams =

American politician (born 1972)

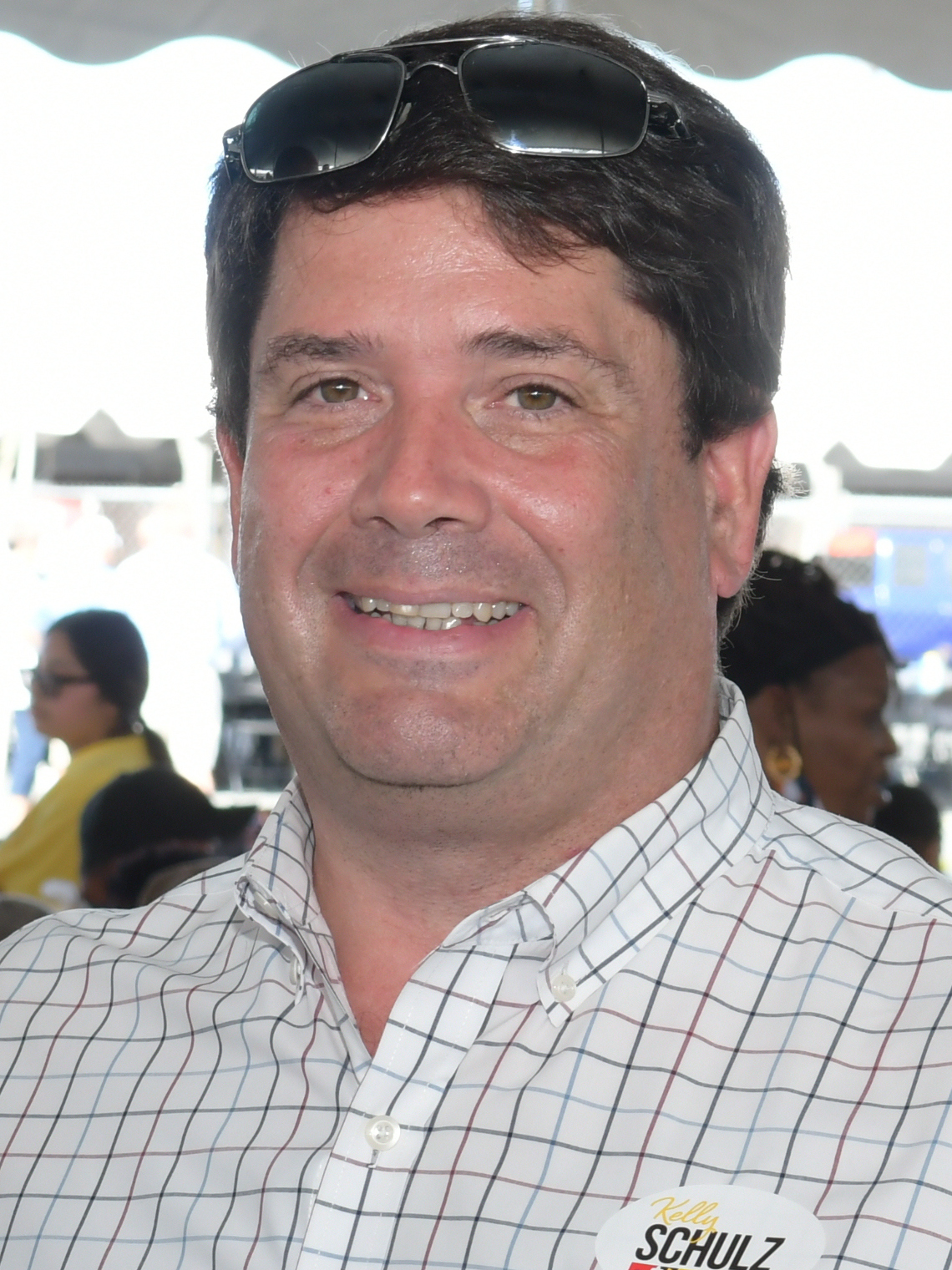
- Adams in 2021

Member of the Maryland House of Delegates from the 37B district
- Incumbent
- Assumed office January 14, 2015
- Preceded by: Adelaide C. Eckardt

Personal details
- Born: June 19, 1972 (age 54) Salisbury, Maryland, U.S.
- Party: Republican
- Children: 3
- Education: Salisbury University (BS, MBA)

Christopher T. Adams (born June 19, 1972) is an American politician who has served as a Republican member of the Maryland House of Delegates, representing District 37B, since 2015.

== Early life and career ==
Adams was born on June 19, 1972, in Salisbury, Maryland, where he attended Wicomico High School in 1990. He graduated from Salisbury University with a Bachelor of Science in business management in 1994 and a M.B.A. in 1996. A fifth generation Eastern Shore native, he is married and has three children.

Adams worked as a salesman from 1992 to 1995 and sales manager from 1995 to 2001 at Value Carpet One. He has served as president of Value Carpet One since 2001.

In October 2013, Adams declared his candidacy for the Maryland House of Delegates. He prevailed in the Republican primary alongside Johnny Mautz, earning 24.5 percent of the vote. He won the general election with 30.3 percent of the vote.

== In the legislature ==
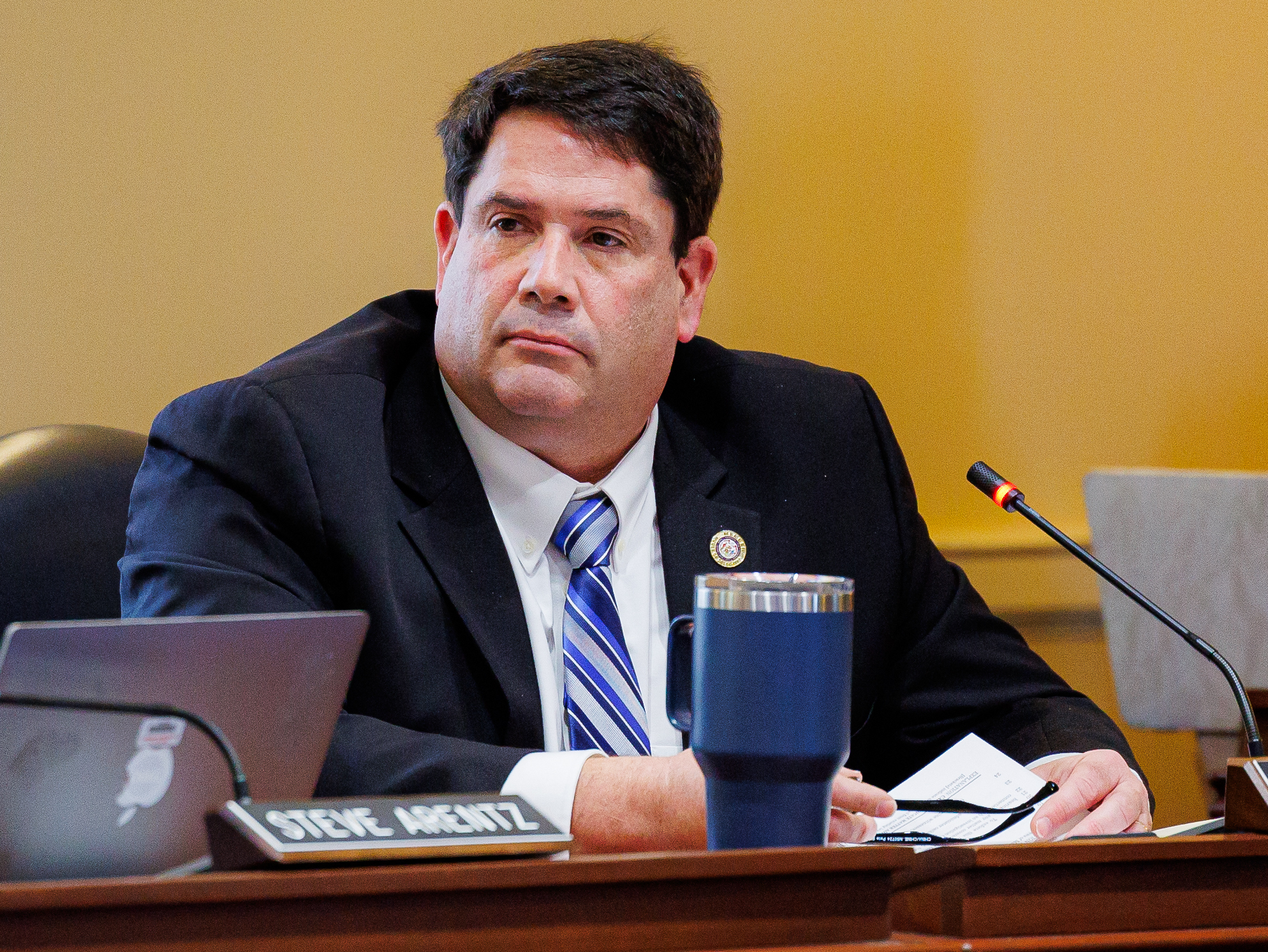
Adams in the House Economic Matters Committee, 2025

Adams has served as a member of the Maryland House of Delegates since January 14, 2015, representing District 37B. He served as the House minority whip from April through December 2021. He has served as the chairman of the Eastern Shore delegation to the Maryland General Assembly for multiple years.

In 2018, Maryland Matters listed Adams as one of the ten most vulnerable House incumbents in the June 2018 General Assembly primaries. Adams would survive his primary with 29.9 percent of the vote and would be re-elected with 33.9 percent of the vote in the general election.

=== Committee assignments ===
- Economics Matters Committee, 2015–present (business regulation subcommittee, 2015–present; property & casualty insurance subcommittee, 2015–2018; unemployment insurance subcommittee, 2015–2018; banking, consumer protection & commercial law subcommittee, 2019–present)
- Rules and Executive Nominations Committee, 2021
- Legislative Policy Committee, 2021

=== Other memberships ===
- Deputy Minority Whip, 2021
- Minority Whip, 2021
- House Chair, Dorchester County Delegation, 2015–present
- Member, Maryland Legislative Sportsmen's Caucus, 2015–present
- Maryland Veterans Caucus, 2015–present (house executive board, 2016–present)

== Political positions ==
Adams is a self-described constitutional conservative who believes that the Constitution should be the basis for which lawmakers operate.

=== Economy ===
In 2019, Adams voted to sustain Governor Larry Hogan's veto on legislation that would increase the state's minimum wage to $15 an hour.

Adams opposed legislation introduced in the 2021 legislative session that would require government-funded construction projects to pay prevailing wages on contracts over $250,000 or when at least 25% of a project's construction costs are from state funds, arguing that the bill would hurt small, minority- and women-owned contractors the most and raise costs for smaller governments. The Maryland General Assembly voted along party lines to override Governor Hogan's veto on the bill in April 2021.

Following the COVID-19 pandemic, Adams defended Governor Hogan's decision to cut federal unemployment benefits, saying that the most direct way to get money to people "is to put them back on the payroll working".

=== Environment ===
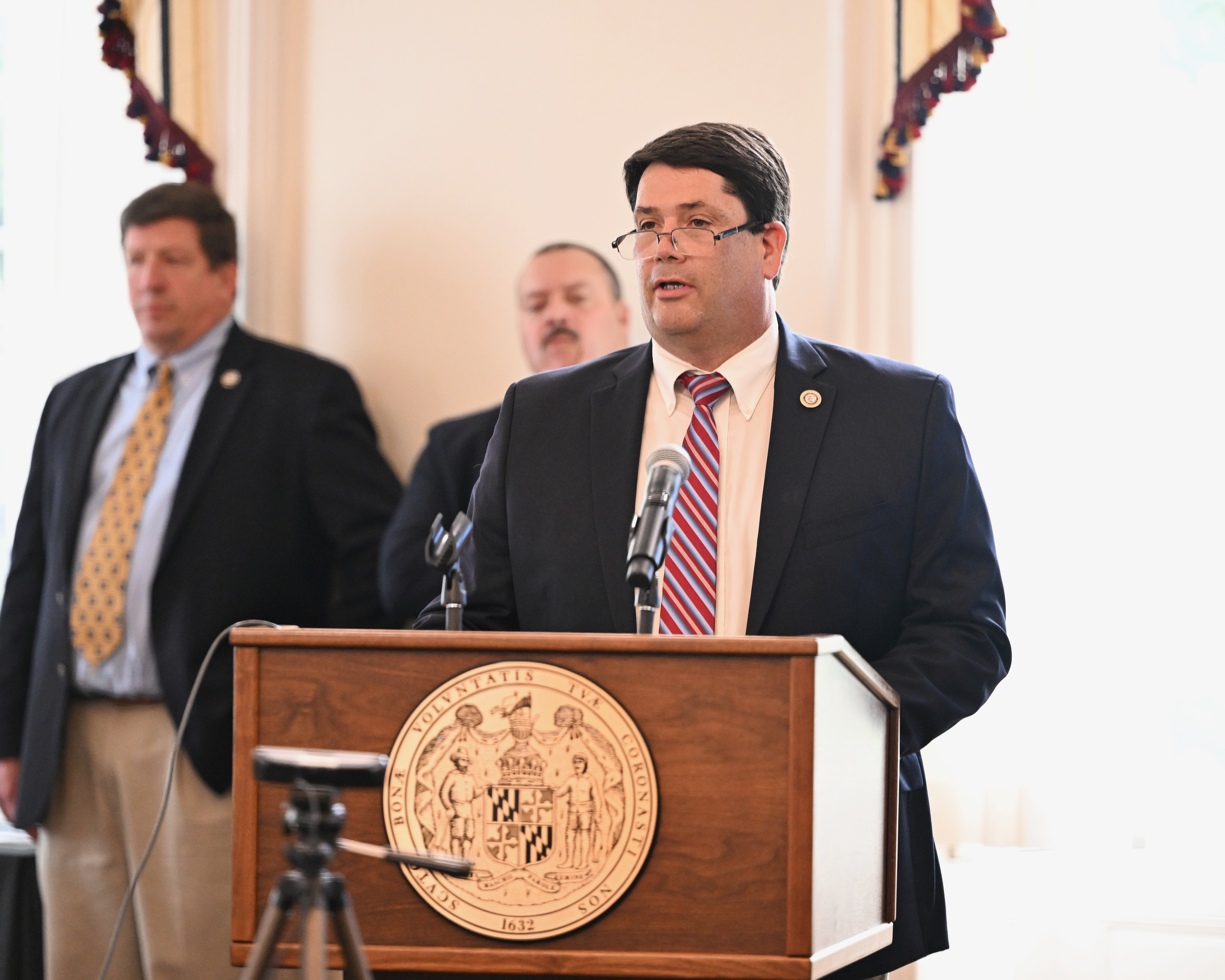
Hartman testifies to the Maryland Board of Public Works against US Wind's proposals to build a wind farm off the coast of Ocean City, 2024

During his 2014 campaign, Adams said that he supports initiatives aimed at restoring wetlands, eliminating raw sewage discharge, cleaning Maryland's headwaters, dredging the Conowingo Reservoir, and improving wastewater treatment plants in Baltimore and Washington, D.C., as a means of improving the water quality of the Chesapeake Bay.

Adams introduced legislation during the 2018 legislative session that would have prohibited the construction of a wind farm 30 miles off the coast of Ocean City, Maryland. The bill received an unfavorable committee report.

During the 2019 legislative session, Adams was one of ten delegates who voted against the Clean Energy Jobs Act, a bill that would require electric utilities use 50 percent renewable energy by 2030. Adams was one of six Republican delegates to receive a score of 0 percent on the annual Maryland League of Conservation Voters scorecard.

Adams proposed an amendment to a water contamination bill introduced during the 2021 legislative session that would have blocked the bill from taking effect without greater guidance from state and federal environmental regulators. The amendment failed to pass in a vote on 42-89.

=== Healthcare ===
Adams proposed an amendment to prescription drug pricing legislation passed during the 2019 legislative session that would have set up a pharmacy benefits manager for the state. The amendment failed to pass in a vote on 39-95.

During the 2021 legislative session, Adams voted against legislation that would provide free menstrual products in school bathrooms.

=== Housing ===
During the 2016 legislative session, Adams introduced a bill that would allow counties to reverse a state rule requiring fire sprinklers to be installed on new and renovated single-family homes.

During the 2021 legislative session, Adams opposed a bill that increased filing fees for cases other than summary ejectments in the state's district courts from $18 to $28, saying that the fee increase was a "slap in the face" for Maryland landlords alongside other tenant relief proposals.

During the 2026 legislative session, Adams criticized a bill that would allow affordable housing construction on state-owned land close to mass transit areas, saying that the bill could be costly to the state due to a provision that recommends the use of project labor agreements on state housing projects. He also opposed a bill that would prohibit landlords from evicting a tenant without just cause.

=== Redistricting ===
During the 2021 special legislative session, Adams supported the congressional redistricting maps proposed by the Maryland Citizens Redistricting Commission appointed by Governor Hogan. In December 2021, Adams joined delegate Kathy Szeliga and Fair Maps Maryland in filing a lawsuit against Maryland's new congressional maps, alleging they violated the state constitution. In January 2026, Adams opposed a congressional redistricting map recommended by the Governor's Redistricting Advisory Commission, which would redraw Maryland's 1st congressional district to increase the Democratic Party's chances of winning it, saying that the map would disenfranchise voters on the Eastern Shore of Maryland.

== Personal life ==
Adams is a fan of the Washington Commanders.

== Electoral history ==
Maryland House of Delegates District 37B Republican Primary Election, 2014
| Party | Candidate | Votes | % |
|---|---|---|---|
| Republican | Johnny Mautz | 5,896 | 36 |
| Republican | Christopher T. Adams | 4,030 | 25 |
| Republican | Rene Desmarais | 3,082 | 19 |
| Republican | Karen Tolley | 1,850 | 11 |
| Republican | Allen Nelson | 1,604 | 10 |

Maryland House of Delegates District 37B General Election, 2014
| Party | Candidate | Votes | % |
|---|---|---|---|
| Republican | Johnny Mautz | 21,057 | 40 |
| Republican | Christopher T. Adams | 16,046 | 30 |
| Democratic | Keasha N. Haythe | 7,957 | 15 |
| Democratic | Rodney Benjamin | 7,852 | 15 |
| Other/Write-in | Other/Write-in | 27 | 0 |

Maryland House of Delegates District 37B Republican Primary Election, 2018
| Party | Candidate | Votes | % |
|---|---|---|---|
| Republican | Johnny Mautz | 6,937 | 51 |
| Republican | Christopher T. Adams | 4,102 | 30 |
| Republican | Keith Graffius | 2,008 | 15 |
| Republican | Mimi Gedamu | 680 | 5 |

Maryland House of Delegates District 37B General Election, 2018
| Party | Candidate | Votes | % |
|---|---|---|---|
| Republican | Christopher T. Adams | 25,031 | 44 |
| Republican | Johnny Mautz | 19,498 | 34 |
| Democratic | Dan O'Hare | 12,796 | 22 |
| Other/Write-in | Other/Write-in | 128 | 0 |
