= List of current members of the Maryland House of Delegates =

Map of Maryland (highlighted in red) within the United States

Map of Maryland house of delegates electoral districts: 3 sub-districts / 2 sub-districts / 1 sub-district; 3 dem. 2 dem., 1 rep. 1 dem., 2 rep. 3 rep. / 2 dem. 1 dem., 1 rep. 2 rep. / 1 dem. 1 rep. 1 ind.

The Maryland House of Delegates is the lower house of the Maryland General Assembly, the state legislature of the U.S. State of Maryland. Three delegates are elected from each district, though some districts are divided into sub-districts. In the original state constitution, four delegates were elected from each county to one-year terms, and two were elected from each of the major early cities of Baltimore and Annapolis. Reforms in the 1830s, however, led to the apportionment of delegates by population rather than geography, and by 1922, delegates served four year terms. The modern system of apportionment of seats began in 1972, when 47 districts of roughly equal population were identified, although sub-districts were created to ensure local representation for areas with too little population to warrant an entire district.

Delegates are elected in even years when the President of the United States is not being elected, similar to most other state offices in Maryland. The most recent election was in November 2022. Delegates are not term-limited.

== Party composition ==
Party composition of the Maryland House of Delegates
Affiliation	Members
Democratic	102
Republican	39
Total	141

== Leadership ==
Leadership of the Maryland House of Delegates
Position	Name	Party	District
Speaker of the House	Joseline Peña-Melnyk	Democratic	21
Speaker Pro Tempore	Luke Clippinger	Democratic	46
Majority Leader	David Moon	Democratic	20
Majority Whip	Ashanti Martinez	Democratic	22
Minority Leader	Jason C. Buckel	Republican	1B
Minority Whip	Jesse Pippy	Republican	4

== Membership ==
Current members of the Maryland House of Delegates
District	Counties	Name	Party	Start	Committee(s)	Refs.
1A	Allegany, Garrett	Jim Hinebaugh	Republican	January 11, 2023	Appropriations	
1B	Allegany	Jason C. Buckel	Republican	January 14, 2015	Ways and Means; Rules and Executive Nominations	
1C	Allegany, Washington	Terry Baker	Republican	January 11, 2023	Environment and Transportation	
2A	Washington	William J. Wivell	Republican	March 16, 2015	Economic Matters	
2A	Washington	William Valentine	Republican	January 11, 2023	Judiciary	
2B	Washington	Matthew Schindler	Democratic	January 7, 2025	Government, Labor, and Elections	
3	Frederick	Ken Kerr	Democratic	January 9, 2019	Government, Labor, and Elections (vice chair)	
3	Frederick	Kris Fair	Democratic	January 11, 2023	Government, Labor, and Elections	
3	Frederick	Karen Simpson	Democratic	January 11, 2023	Judiciary	
4	Carroll, Frederick	Barrie Ciliberti	Republican	February 4, 2015 (Note: Previous service: January 11, 1995, to January 13, 1999)	Government, Labor, and Elections	
4	Carroll, Frederick	Jesse Pippy	Republican	January 9, 2019	Economic Matters; Rules and Executive Nominations	
4	Carroll, Frederick	April Fleming Miller	Republican	January 11, 2023	Ways and Means	
5	Carroll	April Rose	Republican	March 16, 2015	Economic Matters	
5	Carroll	Christopher Eric Bouchat	Republican	January 11, 2023	Judiciary	
5	Carroll	Chris Tomlinson	Republican	January 11, 2023	Government, Labor, and Elections	
6	Baltimore County	Robin Grammer Jr.	Republican	January 14, 2015	Environment and Transportation	
6	Baltimore County	Bob Long	Republican	January 14, 2015	Ways and Means	
6	Baltimore County	Richard W. Metzgar	Republican	January 14, 2015	Appropriations	
7A	Baltimore County	Kathy Szeliga	Republican	January 12, 2011	Health; Rules and Executive Nominations	
7A	Baltimore County	Ryan Nawrocki	Republican	January 11, 2023	Environment and Transportation	
7B	Harford	Lauren Arikan	Republican	January 9, 2019	Judiciary	
8	Baltimore County	Harry Bhandari	Democratic	January 9, 2019	Economic Matters	
8	Baltimore County	Nick Allen	Democratic	January 11, 2023	Environment and Transportation	
8	Baltimore County	Kim Ross	Democratic	March 3, 2025	Health	
9A	Howard, Montgomery	Chao Wu	Democratic	January 11, 2023	Government, Labor, and Elections	
9A	Howard, Montgomery	Natalie Ziegler	Democratic	January 11, 2023	Environment and Transportation	
9B	Howard	Courtney Watson	Democratic	January 9, 2019	Appropriations	
10	Baltimore County	Adrienne A. Jones	Democratic	October 21, 1997	Appropriations	
10	Baltimore County	N. Scott Phillips	Democratic	January 11, 2023	Judiciary	
10	Baltimore County	Jennifer White Holland	Democratic	January 11, 2023	Health	
11A	Baltimore County	Cheryl Pasteur	Democratic	January 11, 2023	Ways and Means	
11B	Baltimore County	Jon S. Cardin	Democratic	January 9, 2019	Judiciary	
11B	Baltimore County	Dana Stein	Democratic	January 10, 2007 (Note: Previous service: June 25, 2002, to January 8, 2003)	Environment and Transportation; Rules and Executive Nominations	
12A	Howard	Jessica Feldmark	Democratic	January 9, 2019	Ways and Means (vice chair)	
12A	Howard	Terri L. Hill	Democratic	January 14, 2015	Health	
12B	Anne Arundel	Gary Simmons	Democratic	January 11, 2023	Judiciary	
13	Howard	Gabriel Moreno	Democratic	January 13, 2026	Judiciary	
13	Howard	Jennifer R. Terrasa	Democratic	January 9, 2019	Government, Labor, and Elections	
13	Howard	Pam Guzzone	Democratic	January 11, 2023	Health	
14	Montgomery	Anne Kaiser	Democratic	January 8, 2003	Appropriations (vice chair)	
14	Montgomery	Pamela E. Queen	Democratic	February 26, 2016	Economic Matters	
14	Montgomery	Bernice Mireku-North	Democratic	January 11, 2023	Ways and Means	
15	Montgomery	Linda Foley	Democratic	December 17, 2021	Environment and Transportation	
15	Montgomery	David Fraser-Hidalgo	Democratic	October 21, 2013	Environment and Transportation	
15	Montgomery	Lily Qi	Democratic	January 9, 2019	Economic Matters	
16	Montgomery	Sarah Wolek	Democratic	April 3, 2023	Appropriations	
16	Montgomery	Marc Korman	Democratic	January 14, 2015	Environment and Transportation (chair); Rules and Executive Nominations	
16	Montgomery	Teresa Saavedra Woorman	Democratic	August 12, 2024	Health	
17	Montgomery	Julie Palakovich Carr	Democratic	January 9, 2019	Ways and Means	
17	Montgomery	Ryan Spiegel	Democratic	July 6, 2023	Appropriations	
17	Montgomery	Joe Vogel	Democratic	January 11, 2023	Ways and Means	
18	Montgomery	Emily Shetty	Democratic	January 9, 2019	Appropriations; Rules and Executive Nominations	
18	Montgomery	Jared Solomon	Democratic	January 9, 2019	Government, Labor, and Elections	
18	Montgomery	Aaron Kaufman	Democratic	January 11, 2023	Health	
19	Montgomery	Bonnie Cullison	Democratic	January 12, 2011	Health (vice chair); Rules and Executive Nominations	
19	Montgomery	Charlotte Crutchfield	Democratic	January 9, 2019	Government, Labor, and Elections	
19	Montgomery	Vaughn Stewart	Democratic	January 9, 2019	Government, Labor, and Elections	
20	Montgomery	Lorig Charkoudian	Democratic	January 9, 2019	Economic Matters (vice chair)	
20	Montgomery	David Moon	Democratic	January 14, 2015	Judiciary; Rules and Executive Nominations	
20	Montgomery	Jheanelle Wilkins	Democratic	January 25, 2017	Ways and Means (chair); Rules and Executive Nominations	
21	Anne Arundel, Prince George's	Ben Barnes	Democratic	January 10, 2007	Appropriations (Chair); Rules and Executive Nominations	
21	Anne Arundel, Prince George's	Mary A. Lehman	Democratic	January 9, 2019	Government, Labor, and Elections	
21	Anne Arundel, Prince George's	Joseline Peña-Melnyk	Democratic	January 10, 2007	Speaker; Rules and Executive Nominations	
22	Prince George's	Nicole A. Williams	Democratic	December 6, 2019	Judiciary	
22	Prince George's	Anne Healey	Democratic	January 9, 1991	Environment and Transportation; Rules and Executive Nominations (chair)	
22	Prince George's	Ashanti Martinez	Democratic	February 24, 2023	Health	
23	Prince George's	Marvin E. Holmes Jr.	Democratic	January 8, 2003	Environment and Transportation; Rules and Executive Nominations (vice chair)	
23	Prince George's	Adrian Boafo	Democratic	January 11, 2023	Economic Matters	
23	Prince George's	Kym Taylor	Democratic	January 11, 2023	Judiciary	
24	Prince George's	Tiffany T. Alston	Democratic	January 11, 2023 (Note: Previous service: January 12, 2011, to October 9, 2012)	Health	
24	Prince George's	Andrea Harrison	Democratic	January 9, 2019	Appropriations	
24	Prince George's	Derrick Coley	Democratic	January 13, 2026	Ways and Means	
25	Prince George's	Kent Roberson	Democratic	May 30, 2023	Ways and Means	
25	Prince George's	Denise Roberts	Democratic	January 8, 2024	Economic Matters	
25	Prince George's	Karen Toles	Democratic	January 12, 2022	Appropriations	
26	Prince George's	Veronica L. Turner	Democratic	January 9, 2019	Economic Matters	
26	Prince George's	Kris Valderrama	Democratic	January 10, 2007	Economic Matters (chair); Rules and Executive Nominations	
26	Prince George's	Jamila Woods	Democratic	January 11, 2023	Judiciary	
27A	Charles, Prince George's	Darrell Odom	Democratic	January 13, 2026	Environment and Transportation	
27B	Calvert, Prince George's	Jeffrie Long Jr.	Democratic	January 11, 2023	Environment and Transportation	
27C	Calvert	Mark N. Fisher	Republican	January 12, 2011	Government, Labor, and Elections	
28	Charles	Debra Davis	Democratic	January 9, 2019	Judiciary (vice chair)	
28	Charles	Edith J. Patterson	Democratic	January 14, 2015	Ways and Means	
28	Charles	C. T. Wilson	Democratic	January 12, 2011	Government, Labor, and Elections; Rules and Executive Nominations	
29A	St. Mary's	Matthew Morgan	Republican	January 14, 2015	Health	
29B	St. Mary's	Brian M. Crosby	Democratic	January 9, 2019	Economic Matters; Rules and Executive Nominations	
29C	Calvert, St. Mary's	Todd Morgan	Republican	January 11, 2023	Environment and Transportation	
30A	Anne Arundel	Dylan Behler	Democratic	February 6, 2025	Environment and Transportation	
30A	Anne Arundel	Dana Jones	Democratic	May 1, 2020	Appropriations	
30B	Anne Arundel	Seth A. Howard	Republican	January 14, 2015	Economic Matters	
31	Anne Arundel	Brian Chisholm	Republican	January 9, 2019	Government, Labor, and Elections	
31	Anne Arundel	Nic Kipke	Republican	January 10, 2007	Health; Rules and Executive Nominations	
31	Anne Arundel	LaToya Nkongolo	Republican	January 10, 2025	Judiciary	
32	Anne Arundel	J. Sandy Bartlett	Democratic	January 9, 2019	Judiciary (chair); Rules and Executive Nominations	
32	Anne Arundel	Mark S. Chang	Democratic	January 14, 2015	Appropriations; Rules and Executive Nominations	
32	Anne Arundel	Mike Rogers	Democratic	January 9, 2019	Economic Matters	
33A	Anne Arundel	Andrew Pruski	Democratic	January 11, 2023	Economic Matters	
33B	Anne Arundel	Stuart Schmidt Jr.	Republican	January 11, 2023	Judiciary	
33C	Anne Arundel	Heather Bagnall	Democratic	January 9, 2019	Health (chair)	
34A	Harford	Steven C. Johnson	Democratic	January 9, 2019	Health	
34A	Harford	Andre Johnson Jr.	Democratic	January 11, 2023	Economic Matters	
34B	Harford	Susan K. McComas	Republican	January 8, 2003	Appropriations	
35A	Harford, Cecil	Mike Griffith	Republican	January 7, 2020	Ways and Means	
35A	Harford, Cecil	Teresa E. Reilly	Republican	January 14, 2015	Health; Rules and Executive Nominations	
35B	Cecil	Kevin Hornberger	Republican	January 14, 2015	Ways and Means	
36	Caroline, Cecil, Kent, Queen Anne's	Steven J. Arentz	Republican	November 19, 2013	Economic Matters	
36	Caroline, Cecil, Kent, Queen Anne's	Jefferson L. Ghrist	Republican	January 14, 2015	Appropriations; Rules and Executive Nominations	
36	Caroline, Cecil, Kent, Queen Anne's	Jay Jacobs	Republican	January 12, 2011	Environment and Transportation	
37A	Dorchester, Wicomico	Sheree Sample-Hughes	Democratic	January 14, 2015	Government, Labor, and Elections	
37B	Caroline, Dorchester, Talbot, Wicomico	Christopher T. Adams	Republican	January 14, 2015	Economic Matters	
37B	Caroline, Dorchester, Talbot, Wicomico	Tom Hutchinson	Republican	January 11, 2023	Health	
38A	Somerset, Wicomico	Kevin Anderson	Republican	November 25, 2025	Environment and Transportation	
38B	Wicomico, Worcester	Barry Beauchamp	Republican	September 10, 2024	Appropriations	
38C	Wicomico, Worcester	Wayne A. Hartman	Republican	January 9, 2019	Ways and Means	
39	Montgomery	Gabriel Acevero	Democratic	January 9, 2019	Appropriations	
39	Montgomery	Lesley Lopez	Democratic	January 9, 2019	Health	
39	Montgomery	W. Gregory Wims	Democratic	May 2, 2023	Ways and Means	
40	Baltimore	Marlon Amprey	Democratic	January 13, 2021	Economic Matters	
40	Baltimore	Frank M. Conaway Jr.	Democratic	January 10, 2007	Judiciary	
40	Baltimore	Melissa Wells	Democratic	January 9, 2019	Government, Labor, and Elections (chair)	
41	Baltimore	Sean Stinnett	Democratic	March 3, 2025	Judiciary	
41	Baltimore	Malcolm Ruff	Democratic	July 6, 2023	Appropriations	
41	Baltimore	Samuel I. Rosenberg	Democratic	January 12, 1983	Health	
42A	Baltimore County	Alex Harlan	Republican	August 3, 2026	Judiciary	
42B	Baltimore County	Michele Guyton	Democratic	January 9, 2019	Environment and Transportation (vice chair)	
42C	Carroll	Joshua Stonko	Republican	January 11, 2023	Appropriations	
43A	Baltimore	Regina T. Boyce	Democratic	January 9, 2019	Environment and Transportation; Rules and Executive Nominations	
43A	Baltimore	Elizabeth Embry	Democratic	January 11, 2023	Judiciary	
43B	Baltimore County	Cathi Forbes	Democratic	October 29, 2019	Appropriations	
44A	Baltimore	Eric Ebersole	Democratic	January 14, 2015	Ways and Means	
44B	Baltimore County	Sheila Ruth	Democratic	January 31, 2020	Government, Labor, and Elections	
44B	Baltimore County	Aletheia McCaskill	Democratic	January 11, 2023	Appropriations	
45	Baltimore	Stephanie M. Smith	Democratic	January 9, 2019	Appropriations; Rules and Executive Nominations	
45	Baltimore	Jackie Addison	Democratic	January 11, 2023	Ways and Means	
45	Baltimore	Caylin Young	Democratic	January 11, 2023	Ways and Means	
46	Baltimore	Luke Clippinger	Democratic	January 12, 2011	Government, Labor, and Elections; Rules and Executive Nominations	
46	Baltimore	Robbyn Lewis	Democratic	January 10, 2017	Environment and Transportation	
46	Baltimore	Mark Edelson	Democratic	January 11, 2023	Appropriations	
47A	Prince George's	Diana M. Fennell	Democratic	January 14, 2015	Economic Matters	
47A	Prince George's	Julian Ivey	Democratic	January 9, 2019	Appropriations	
47B	Prince George's	Deni Taveras	Democratic	January 11, 2023	Health	

== See also ==
- List of current members of the Maryland Senate
