= Maryland Legislative District 30 =

American legislative district

Maryland's legislative district 30
- Represents part of Anne Arundel County
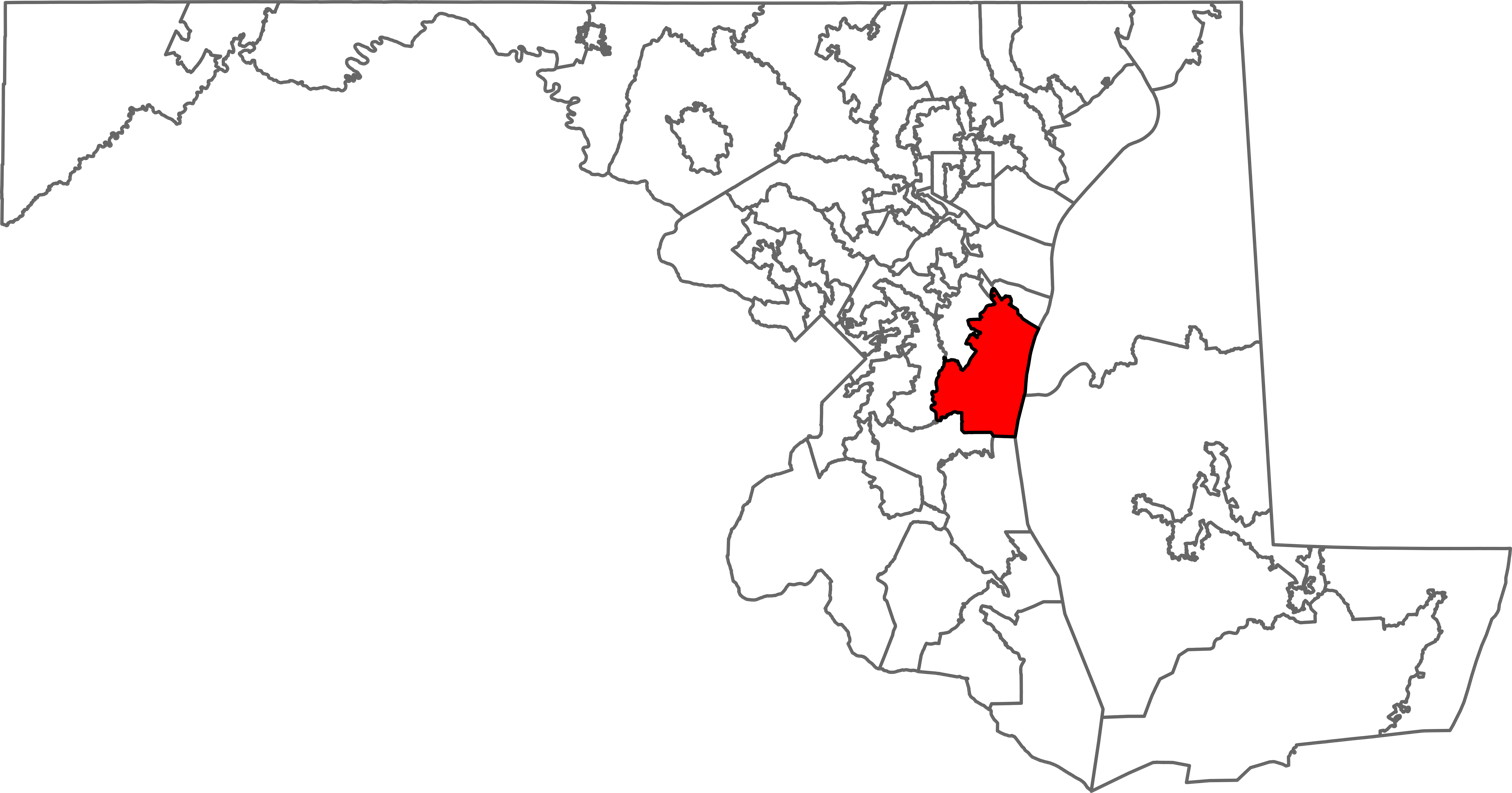
- Senator: Shaneka T. Henson (D)
- Delegate(s): Dana C. Jones (D) (District 30A); Dylan Behler (D) (District 30A); Seth A. Howard (R) (District 30B)
- Registration: 43.3% Democratic; 34.0% Republican; 21.4% unaffiliated
- Demographics: 71.4% White; 11.7% Black/African American; 0.5% Native American; 2.1% Asian; 0.0% Hawaiian/Pacific Islander; 6.9% Other race; 7.4% Two or more races; 12.2% Hispanic
- Population (2020): 124,623
- Voting-age population: 99,393
- Registered voters: 91,447

Maryland Legislative District 30 is one of 47 districts in the state for the Maryland General Assembly. It covers part of Anne Arundel County, Maryland, it is home to Maryland's capital; the city of Annapolis. Until the 2010 census and subsequent redistricting, voters in this district selected three Delegates every four years to represent them in the Maryland House of Delegates. Starting with the 2014 election, the district was divided into sub-districts 30A and 30B.

== Demographic characteristics ==
As of the 2020 United States census, the district had a population of 124,623, of whom 99,393 (79.8%) were of voting age. The racial makeup of the district was 88,997 (71.4%) White, 14,596 (11.7%) African American, 566 (0.5%) Native American, 2,581 (2.1%) Asian, 57 (0.0%) Pacific Islander, 8,570 (6.9%) from some other race, and 9,265 (7.4%) from two or more races. Hispanic or Latino of any race were 15,170 (12.2%) of the population.

The district had 91,447 registered voters as of October 17, 2020, of whom 19,573 (21.4%) were registered as unaffiliated, 31,047 (34.0%) were registered as Republicans, 39,609 (43.3%) were registered as Democrats, and 629 (0.7%) were registered to other parties.

== Political representation ==
The district is represented for the 2023–2027 legislative term in the State Senate by Shaneka T. Henson (D) and in the House of Delegates by Dana C. Jones (D, District 30A), Dylan Behler (D, District 30A), and Seth A. Howard (R, District 30B).

== Election history ==
Years	Senator	Party	Electoral history
January 8, 1975 – November 13, 1978	Edward T. Hall	Republican	Redistricted from District 6-C and re-elected in 1974. Re-elected in 1978. Died.
December 4, 1978 – October 8, 1981	Aris T. Allen	Republican	Appointed to serve the remainder of Hall's term. Resigned.
December 2, 1981 – January 12, 1983	David M. King	Republican	Appointed to serve the remainder of Allen's term. Redistricted to the 29th district.
January 12, 1983 – January 11, 1995	Gerald W. Winegrad	Democratic	Elected in 1982. Re-elected in 1986. Re-elected in 1990. Retired.
January 11, 1995 – January 9, 2019	John Astle	Democratic	Elected in 1994. Re-elected in 1998. Re-elected in 2002. Re-elected in 2006. Re-elected in 2010. Re-elected in 2014. Retired.
January 9, 2019 – January 2, 2025	Sarah Elfreth	Democratic	Elected in 2018. Re-elected in 2022. Resigned.
January 8, 2025 – present	Shaneka Henson	Democratic	Appointed to serve the remainder of Elfreth's term. Elected in 2026.

== Past election results ==
2010 Race for Maryland House of Delegates – 30th District Voters to choose three:
Name	Votes	Percent	Outcome
Ron George, Rep.	25,631	19.25%	Won
Michael E. Busch, Dem.	23,995	18.02%	Won
Herb McMillan, Rep.	22,553	16.94%	Won
Virginia P. Clagett, Dem.	21,142	15.88%	Lost
Seth Howard, Rep.	20,080	15.08%	Lost
Judd Legum, Dem.	19,670	14.77%	Lost

2006 Race for Maryland House of Delegates– 30th District Voters to choose three:
Name	Votes	Percent	Outcome
Michael E. Busch, Dem.	22,479	17.1%	Won
Virginia P. Clagett, Dem.	22,360	17.0%	Won
Ron George, Rep.	21,811	16.6%	Won
Barbara Samorajczyk, Dem.	21,758	16.5%	Lost
Andy Smarick, Rep.	20,594	15.6%	Lost
Ron Elfenbein, Rep.	20,497	15.5%	Lost

2002 Race for Maryland House of Delegates – 30th District Voters to choose three:
Name	Votes	Percent	Outcome
Michael E. Busch, Dem.	22,422	17.7%	Won
Virginia P. Clagett, Dem.	21,875	17.3%	Won
Herbert H. McMillan, Rep.	20,972	16.6%	Won
C. Richard D'Amato, Dem.	20,545	16.3%	Lost
Michael Collins, Rep.	19,140	15.1%	Lost
Nancy Almgren, Rep.	18,861	14.9%	Lost
David M. Gross, Green	2,536	2.0%	Lost
Other Write-Ins	71	0.1%	

1998 Race for Maryland House of Delegates– District 30 Voters to choose three:
Name	Votes	Percent	Outcome
Michael E. Busch, Dem.	24,075	21%	Won
Virginia P. Clagett, Dem.	24,036	21%	Won
C. Richard D'Amato, Dem.	20,223	18%	Won
Phillip D. Bissett, Rep.	18,690	16%	Lost
Edward J. Turner, Rep.	14,119	12%	Lost
Anthony McConkey, Rep.	12,353	11%	Lost

1994 Race for Maryland House of Delegates – District 30 Voters to choose three:
Name	Votes	Percent	Outcome
Michael E. Busch, Dem.	18,709	19%	Won
Phillip D. Bissett, Rep.	18,009	23%	Won
Virginia P. Clagett, Dem.	18,254	18%	Won
Ralph C. Rosacker, Rep.	16,299	16%	Lost
Joan Beck, Rep.	15,974	16%	Lost
John C. Eldridge Jr., Dem.	13,320	13%	Lost

1990 Race for Maryland House of Delegates – District 30 Voters to choose three:
Name	Votes	Percent	Outcome
John Astle, Dem.	18,009	23%	Won
Aris T. Allen, Rep.	16,951	22%	Won
Michael E. Busch, Dem.	16,104	18%	Won
Edith Segree, Dem.	14,341	18%	Lost
Phillip D. Bissett, Rep.	13,321	17%	Lost
