= Senator Henson =

Senator Henson may refer to:

- Shaneka Henson (born 1983), Maryland State Senate
- Steve Henson (politician) (born 1959), Georgia State Senate
