= List of current members of the Maryland Senate =

Party Composition of Maryland State Senate districts.

The Maryland Senate is the upper house of the Maryland General Assembly, the state legislature of the U.S. State of Maryland. One Senator is elected from each of the state's 47 electoral districts. As of January 2023, 34 of those seats are held by Democrats and 13 by Republicans. The leader of the Senate is known as the President, a position currently held by Bill Ferguson, who represents Baltimore. In addition, senators elect a President Pro Tempore, and the respective party caucuses elect a majority and minority leader and a majority and minority whip.

Senators are elected in even-numbered years when the President of the United States is not being elected, similar to most other state offices in Maryland. The most recent election was in November 2022. Senators are not term-limited. Should a Senator resign from office before their term expires, the local central committee of the party to which the retiring senator belonged makes a recommendation to the Governor for whom to appoint to the open seat. It is tradition for the Governor to appoint the recommended person. Nine of the current members of the Maryland State Senate were originally appointed, all of whom have since been elected in their own right. Newly elected senators are sworn in and begin work on the second Wednesday of the January following their election.

Each Senator has at least one standing committee assignment. The first is to one of the four legislative committees: Budget and Taxation; Education, Health, and Environmental Affairs (listed in this table as Education, Health, and Environment); Finance; or Judicial Proceedings. A number of senators have secondary committee assignments, most prominently to the Executive Nominations Committee, which oversees the constitutional responsibility of the Senate to approve nominations by the Governor. Assignment to the Rules or Executive Nominations committees or to any Ad Hoc committees is not noted.

== Current party composition ==
Composition as of the beginning of the 2019–2022 term on January 9, 2019:

Affiliation	Senators
Democratic Party	34
Republican Party	13
Total	47
Democratic majority	20 (72.3%)

During the 2015–2018 term, the State Senate was made up of 33 Democrats and 14 Republicans. Republicans gained two seats (District 38 in Worcester, Wicomico and Somerset counties and District 42 in Baltimore County), while losing one seat (District 9 in Howard and Carroll counties) in the elections held on November 6, 2018. Democrats maintain a super-majority in the chamber. Article II, Section 17(a) of the Maryland Constitution specifies it takes a three-fifths vote of both chambers to override a veto, which is 29 votes in the State Senate. The rules of the Senate also permit members to limit debate by a three-fifths majority vote, meaning Republicans would need to gain four additional seats, for a total of 19, in order to sustain a veto or filibuster legislation.

== Current leadership ==
The below table reflects the current leadership of the Maryland State Senate as of October 4, 2021.

Position	Name	Party	District
President of the Senate	Bill Ferguson	Democratic	46
President pro tem	Malcolm Augustine	Democratic	47
Majority Leader	Nancy J. King	Democratic	39
Majority Vice Leader	Joanne C. Benson	Democratic	24
Minority Leader	Steve Hershey	Republican	36
Minority Vice Leader	Justin Ready	Republican	5

== Current state senators ==
District	Jurisdiction(s) represented	Image	Senator	Party	First elected	Primary committee
1	Allegany, Garrett, and Washington		Mike McKay	Republican	2022	Judicial Proceedings
2	Washington		Paul D. Corderman	Republican	Appointed and sworn in on September 1, 2020; first elected November 2022	Budget and Taxation
3	Frederick		Karen Lewis Young	Democratic	2022	Budget and Taxation
4	Frederick		William Folden	Republican	2022	Judicial Proceedings
5	Carroll		Justin Ready	Republican	Appointed and sworn in on February 2, 2015; first elected November 2018	Finance
6	Baltimore County		Johnny Ray Salling	Republican	2014	Budget and Taxation
7	Baltimore County and Harford		J. B. Jennings	Republican	2010	Budget and Taxation
8	Baltimore County		Carl W. Jackson	Democratic	Appointed and sworn in on February 5, 2025	Finance
9	Carroll and Howard		Katie Fry Hester	Democratic	2018	Education, Energy, and the Environment
10	Baltimore County		Benjamin Brooks	Democratic	2022	Education, Energy, and the Environment
11	Baltimore County		Shelly L. Hettleman	Democratic	Appointed January 30, 2020 and sworn in on February 3, 2020; first elected November 2022	Budget and Taxation
12	Baltimore County and Howard		Clarence Lam	Democratic	2018	Finance
13	Howard		Guy Guzzone	Democratic	2014	Budget and Taxation (Chair)
14	Montgomery		Craig Zucker	Democratic	Appointed February 3, 2016 and sworn in on February 4, 2016; first elected November 2018	Budget and Taxation
15	Montgomery		Brian Feldman	Democratic	Appointed September 12, 2013 and sworn in on September 17, 2013; first elected 2014	Education, Energy, and the Environment (Chair)
16	Montgomery		Sara N. Love	Democratic	Appointed and sworn in on June 13, 2024	Judicial Proceedings
17	Montgomery		Cheryl Kagan	Democratic	2014	Education, Energy, and the Environment
18	Montgomery		Jeff Waldstreicher	Democratic	2018	Judicial Proceedings
19	Montgomery		Benjamin F. Kramer	Democratic	2018	Finance
20	Montgomery		William C. Smith Jr.	Democratic	Appointed December 13, 2016 and sworn in on December 21, 2016; first elected November 2018	Judicial Proceedings (Chair)
21	Anne Arundel and Prince George's		James Rosapepe	Democratic	2006	Budget and Taxation
22	Prince George's		Alonzo T. Washington	Democratic	Appointed and sworn in on January 27, 2023	Finance
23	Prince George's		Ron Watson	Democratic	Appointed August 27, 2021 and sworn in on August 31, 2021; first elected November 2022	Education, Energy, and the Environment
24	Prince George's		Joanne C. Benson	Democratic	2010	Budget and Taxation
25	Prince George's		Nick Charles	Democratic	Appointed and sworn in on December 5, 2023	Judicial Proceedings
26	Prince George's		C. Anthony Muse	Democratic	2022	Judicial Proceedings
27	Calvert, Charles and Prince George's		Kevin Harris	Democratic	Appointed December 5, 2025 and sworn in on December 9, 2025	Education, Energy, and the Environment
28	Charles		Arthur Ellis	Democratic	2018	Finance
29	Calvert, and St. Mary's		Jack Bailey	Republican	2018	Budget and Taxation
30	Anne Arundel		Shaneka Henson	Democratic	Appointed and sworn in on January 8, 2025	Judicial Proceedings
31	Anne Arundel		Bryan Simonaire	Republican	2006	Education, Energy, and the Environment
32	Anne Arundel		Pamela Beidle	Democratic	2018	Finance (Chair)
33	Anne Arundel		Dawn Gile	Democratic	2022	Finance
34	Harford		Mary-Dulany James	Democratic	2022	Judicial Proceedings
35	Cecil and Harford		Jason C. Gallion	Republican	2018	Education, Energy, and the Environment
36	Caroline, Cecil, Kent, and Queen Anne's		Steve Hershey	Republican	Appointed September 18, 2013 and sworn in on October 1, 2013; first elected 2014	Finance
37	Caroline, Dorchester, Talbot, and Wicomico		Johnny Mautz	Republican	2022	Finance
38	Somerset, Wicomico, and Worcester		Mary Beth Carozza	Republican	2018	Education, Energy, and the Environment
39	Montgomery		Nancy J. King	Democratic	Appointed and sworn in on September 5, 2007; first elected 2010	Budget and Taxation
40	Baltimore		Antonio Hayes	Democratic	2018	Finance
41	Baltimore		Dalya Attar	Democratic	Appointed and sworn in on January 24, 2025	Education, Energy, and the Environment
42	Baltimore County		Chris West	Republican	2018	Judicial Proceedings
43	Baltimore		Mary L. Washington	Democratic	2018	Education, Energy, and the Environment
44	Baltimore and Baltimore County		Charles E. Sydnor III	Democratic	2019	Judicial Proceedings
45	Baltimore		Cory V. McCray	Democratic	2018	Budget and Taxation
46	Baltimore		Bill Ferguson	Democratic	2010	President of the Senate^{[b]}
47	Prince George's		Malcolm Augustine	Democratic	2018	Education, Energy, and the Environment

== Notes ==
^{a} This Senator was originally appointed to office by the Governor to fill an open seat.

^{b} The President of the Senate does not serve on any of the four standing legislative committees. He does, however, serve on both the Executive Nominations and the Rules Committees.

== See also ==
- List of current members of the Maryland House of Delegates
