= Dylan Behler =

American politician (born 1998)

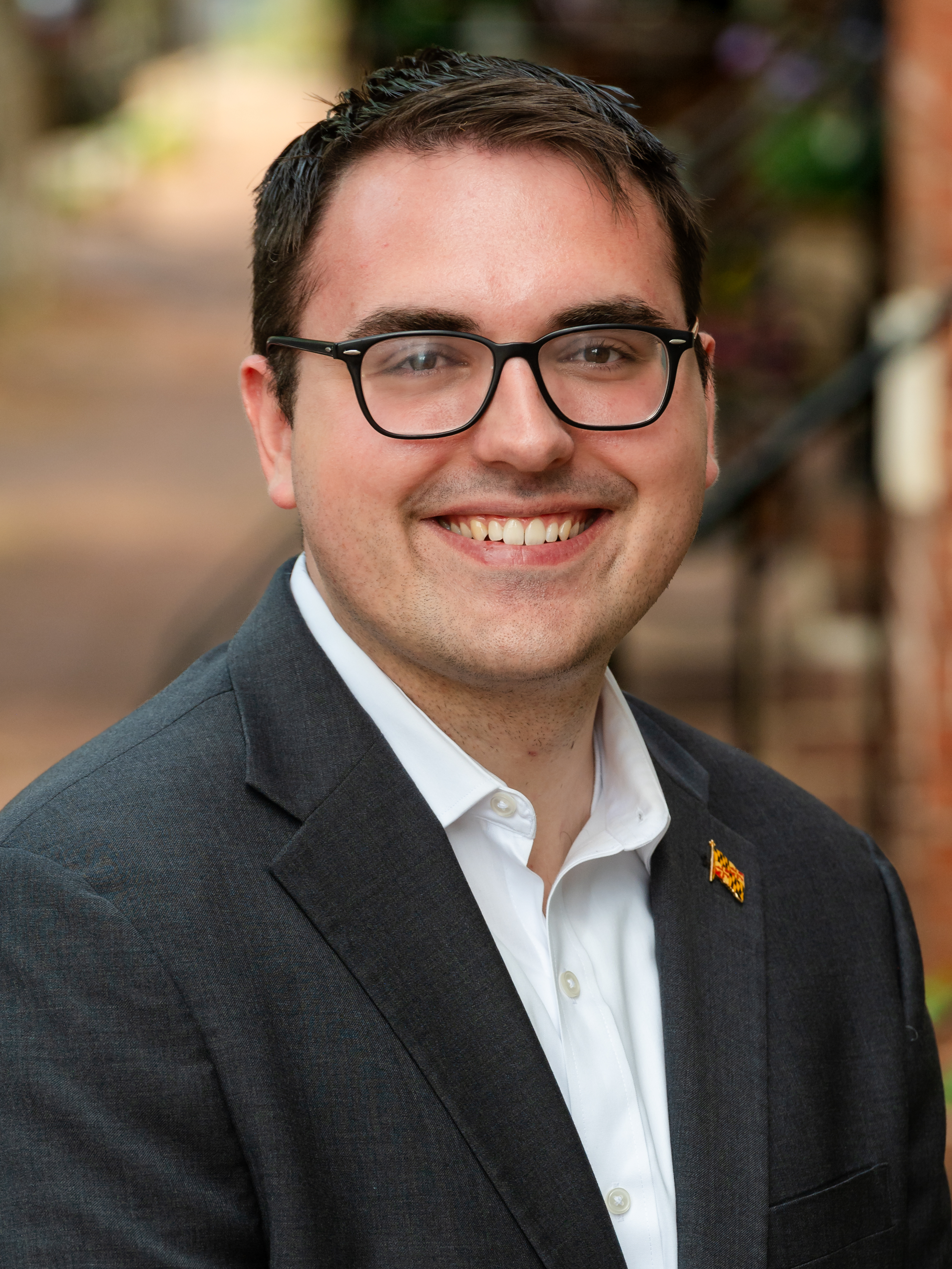
- Behler in 2026

Member of the Maryland House of Delegates from the 30A district
- Incumbent
- Assumed office February 6, 2025 Serving with Dana Jones
- Appointed by: Wes Moore
- Preceded by: Shaneka Henson

Personal details
- Born: June 5, 1998 (age 28) Annapolis, Maryland, U.S.
- Party: Democratic
- Education: University of Maryland, College Park (BA)

Dylan Andrew Behler (born June 5, 1998) is an American politician who has served as a member of the Maryland House of Delegates representing district 30A since 2025. A member of the Democratic Party, he previously served as the chief of staff to state senator Sarah Elfreth.

== Background ==
Behler was born in Annapolis, Maryland, on June 5, 1998, and is a life-long resident of Anne Arundel County. He graduated from Southern High School in 2016, afterwards attending the University of Maryland, College Park, where he worked as a government affairs intern for the AFL-CIO Building and Construction Trades Department in 2017 and graduated with a Bachelor of Arts degree in political science and government in 2020.

In 2018, Behler worked on the campaigns of Alice J. Cain and Steuart Pittman. He also worked as a committee analyst for Senate President Thomas V. Miller Jr., and later served as legislative director and chief of staff for state senator Sarah Elfreth from 2019 to 2023. He also served as a member of the Anne Arundel Democratic Central Committee from 2019 to 2025, and was a delegate to the 2024 Democratic National Convention. Before being appointed to serve in the Maryland House of Delegates, Behler worked as the director of legislative and constituent services for the Maryland Department of Natural Resources.

== In the legislature ==
In January 2025, after state delegate Shaneka Henson was appointed to the Maryland Senate, Behler applied to fill the remainder of her term in the Maryland House of Delegates. He was nominated to the seat by the Anne Arundel Democratic Central Committee—which Behler was a member of at the time of the vote—on February 1, 2025, with Behler receiving 10 votes, progressive activist Chrissy Holt receiving seven, and Annapolis alderman Brooks Schandelmeier receiving one. Behler was sworn in on February 6, 2025. Sworn in at 26 years old, he is currently the youngest member of the Maryland General Assembly.

As of September 2026, Behler has served as a member of the Environment and Transportation Committee since 2025. He is also a member of the Maryland Legislative Latino Caucus and the Maryland Legislative LGBTQ+ Caucus.

== Political positions ==
=== Agriculture ===
In May 2026, Behler helped organize a coalition of over 40 members of the Maryland General Assembly requesting emergency assistance to farms and wineries that had seen severe crop loss because of the late spring frost.

=== Chesapeake Bay ===
In October 2026, Behler led a bipartisan coalition of 29 Maryland legislators calling for stronger protections for Atlantic menhaden in the Chesapeake Bay. The coalition urged the Atlantic States Marine Fisheries Commission to reduce the Bay's menhaden harvest cap and adopt additional conservation measures to protect the species and the broader Bay ecosystem.

=== Environment ===
In September 2026, amid efforts to prevent Maryland's "flush tax" from being cut from $5 to $2.50 per month in 2030, Behler called the Bay Restoration Fund "one of the single most important successful efforts that the state of Maryland [has used] to fund major environmental improvements" and suggested reforms to the fund, including support for sewage treatment plant maintenance, septic system improvements and sewer conversions, and the removal of PFAS from discharged water.

=== Energy ===
During the 2026 legislative session, Behler introduced the a bill to repeal the Strategic Infrastructure Development and Enhancement (STRIDE) program, which encourages utilities to upgrade aging natural gas pipelines by letting them recover the costs of their projects in advance. He also defended Maryland's participation in the Regional Greenhouse Gas Initiative (RGGI) during the 2026 session session while debating the Utility RELIEF Act, saying that RGGI increases energy efficiency and drives down increased demand for electricity across the state.

=== Housing ===
During the 2026 legislative session, Behler sponsored the Housing Certainty Act, which would give Maryland developers "early vesting" on housing projects.

=== Redistricting ===
In December 2025, Behler testified to the Governor's Redistricting Advisory Commission in support of mid-decade redistricting in Maryland, saying that he supported redistricting "that allows us to fight back against the erosion of our democracy nationwide".

== Electoral history ==
Anne Arundel County Democratic Central Committee District 30 election, 2018
Party	Candidate	Votes	%
Democratic	Eileen Hoover	6,625	30.9
Democratic	Thea Boykins-Wilson	6,385	29.8
Democratic	Brooks Schandelmeier	4,369	20.4
Democratic	Dylan Andrew Behler	4,072	19.0

Anne Arundel County Democratic Central Committee District 30 election, 2022
Party	Candidate	Votes	%
Democratic	Scott MacMullan	10,179	50.5
Democratic	Dylan Behler	9,975	49.5

Maryland House of Delegates District 30A Democratic Primary, 2026
Party	Candidate	Votes	%
Democratic	Dylan Behler	5,957	36.6
Democratic	Dana Jones	8,168	50.2
Democratic	Bradley K. O'Neal	2,141	13.1
