= Maryland House of Delegates District 30B =

American legislative district

Maryland's legislative district 30B
- Represents part of Anne Arundel County
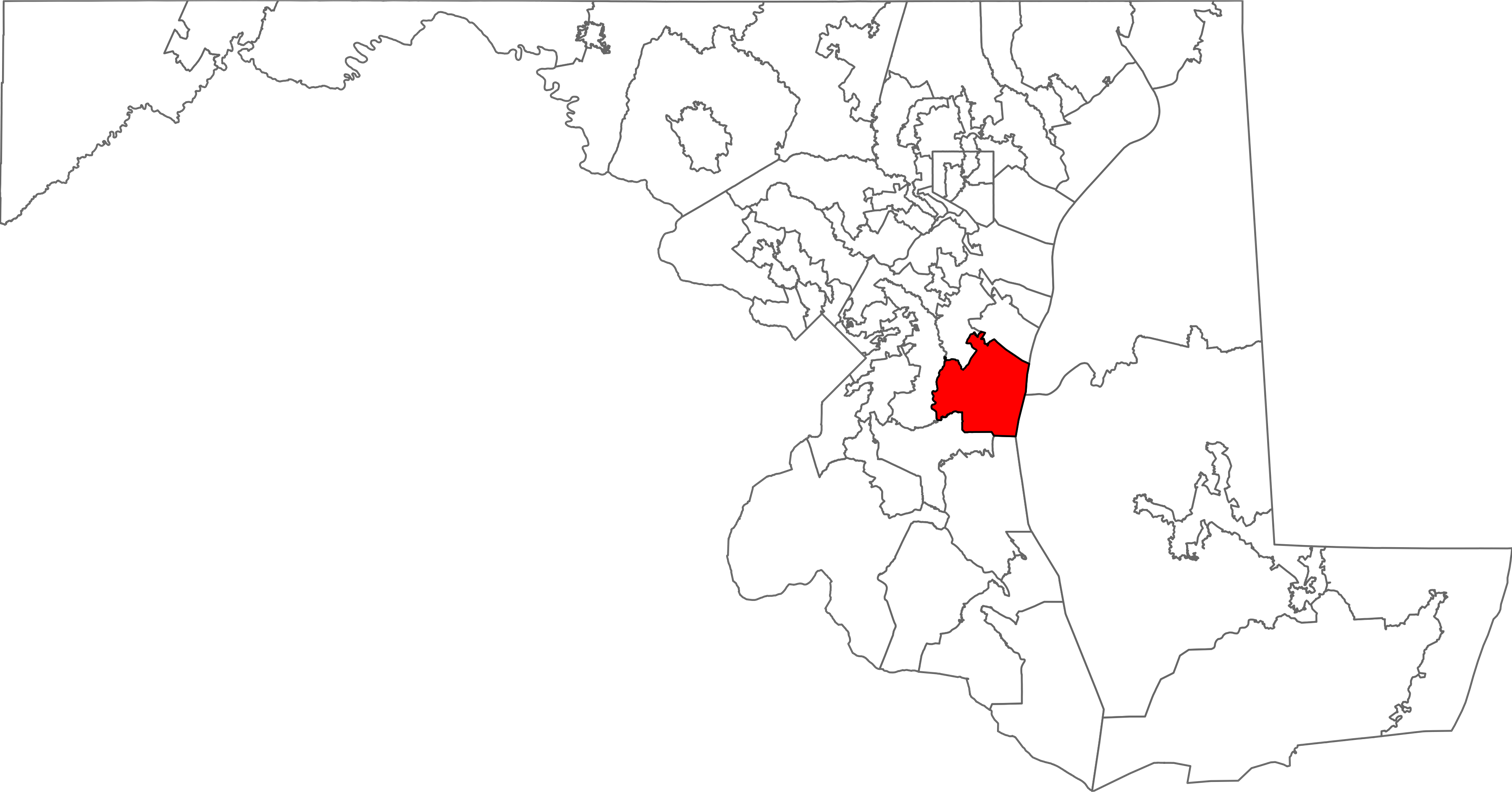
- Delegate(s): Seth A. Howard (R)
- Registration: 42.2% Republican; 34.7% Democratic; 21.9% unaffiliated
- Demographics: 80.2% White; 6.9% Black/African American; 0.4% Native American; 1.4% Asian; 0.0% Hawaiian/Pacific Islander; 3.7% Other race; 7.4% Two or more races; 7.4% Hispanic
- Population (2020): 42,503
- Voting-age population: 33,354
- Registered voters: 32,060

Maryland House of Delegates District 30B is one of the 71 districts that compose the Maryland House of Delegates. Along with subdistrict 30A, it makes up the 30th district of the Maryland Senate. District 30B includes part of Anne Arundel County, and is represented by one delegate.

== Demographic characteristics ==
As of the 2020 United States census, the district had a population of 42,503, of whom 33,354 (78.5%) were of voting age. The racial makeup of the district was 34,100 (80.2%) White, 2,937 (6.9%) African American, 155 (0.4%) Native American, 587 (1.4%) Asian, 20 (0.0%) Pacific Islander, 1,555 (3.7%) from some other race, and 3,154 (7.4%) from two or more races. Hispanic or Latino of any race were 3,135 (7.4%) of the population.

The district had 32,060 registered voters as of October 17, 2020, of whom 7,023 (21.9%) were registered as unaffiliated, 13,523 (42.2%) were registered as Republicans, 11,131 (34.7%) were registered as Democrats, and 186 (0.6%) were registered to other parties.

== Past Election Results ==
=== 2014 ===
Name	Party	Votes	Percent	Outcome
Seth A. Howard	Republican	9,496	63.3%	Won
Mitchelle Stephenson	Democratic	5,496	36.6%	Lost
Other Write-Ins		10	0.1%	

=== 2018 ===
Name	Party	Votes	Percent	Outcome
Seth A. Howard	Republican	10,046	54.4%	Won
Mike Shay	Democratic	8,420	45.6%	Lost
Other Write-Ins		17	0.1%	
