= Alice J. Cain =

American politician

Member of the Maryland House of Delegates from the 30A district
- In office January 9, 2019 – March 18, 2020 Serving with Michael E. Busch, Shaneka Henson
- Preceded by: Herbert H. McMillan
- Succeeded by: Dana Jones

Personal details
- Born: August 30, 1967 (age 59)
- Party: Democratic
- Spouse: Married
- Children: Two children
- Education: Gettysburg College, B.A. (political science & government), cum laude, 1989
- Website: www.alicejcain.com

Alice J. Cain (born August 30, 1967) is a Democratic politician and education policy expert who was a member of the Maryland House of Delegates representing District 30A in Anne Arundel County from January 2019 to March 2020.

== Education ==
Cain attended Gettysburg College, graduating cum laude in 1989 with B.A. in political science & government.

== Career ==
Cain is currently the Executive Director for The Moriah Fund, a private foundation dedicated to promoting human rights and social justice.

Cain was a legislative aide to Sen. Paul Simon of Illinois, 1990–1995, after volunteering for his Presidential Campaign in 1988. She worked at the National Institute for Literacy, an arm of the United States Department of Education, 1995–1999, and for the Children's Defense Fund, 2002–2004. Cain worked as the senior education policy advisor to Rep. George Miller of California, 2004–2009, including during his service as the chairman of the U.S. House Education and Labor Committee, where she was his lead staffer for both the Race to the Top and the Investing in Innovation (I3) education laws.

In the House of Delegates, Cain was a member of the Ways and Means Committee (education subcommittee, election law subcommittee); the Maryland Legislative Transit Caucus; the Women Legislators of Maryland Caucus; the Veterans Caucus, and an associate member of the Maryland Legislative Latino Caucus. She was the House sponsor of the Maryland Green Schools Act of 2018, which was signed into law by Governor Larry Hogan.

Elected in November 2018 after a primary that included eight candidates, Cain announced her resignation on March 19, 2020 (effective midnight March 18), citing "unforeseen family circumstances" that had changed "well before COVID-19". Cain said she made her announcement immediately after the legislature's early adjournment so that her replacement could be appointed and assume office in time for a special General Assembly session that was anticipated in late May; legislative leaders later decided not to call the special session.

== Election results ==
- 2018 Race for Maryland House of Delegates – District 30A

Voters to choose two:

Name	Votes	Percent	Outcome
Michael E. Busch, Dem.	20,080	32.6%	Won
Alice J. Cain, Dem.	18,070	29.3%	Won
Chelsea Gill, Rep.	12,097	19.6%	Lost
Bob O'Shea, Rep.	11,324	18.4%	Lost
Other Write-Ins	53	0.01%	Lost
