= Maryland House of Delegates District 30A =

American legislative district

Maryland's legislative district 30A
- Represents part of Anne Arundel County
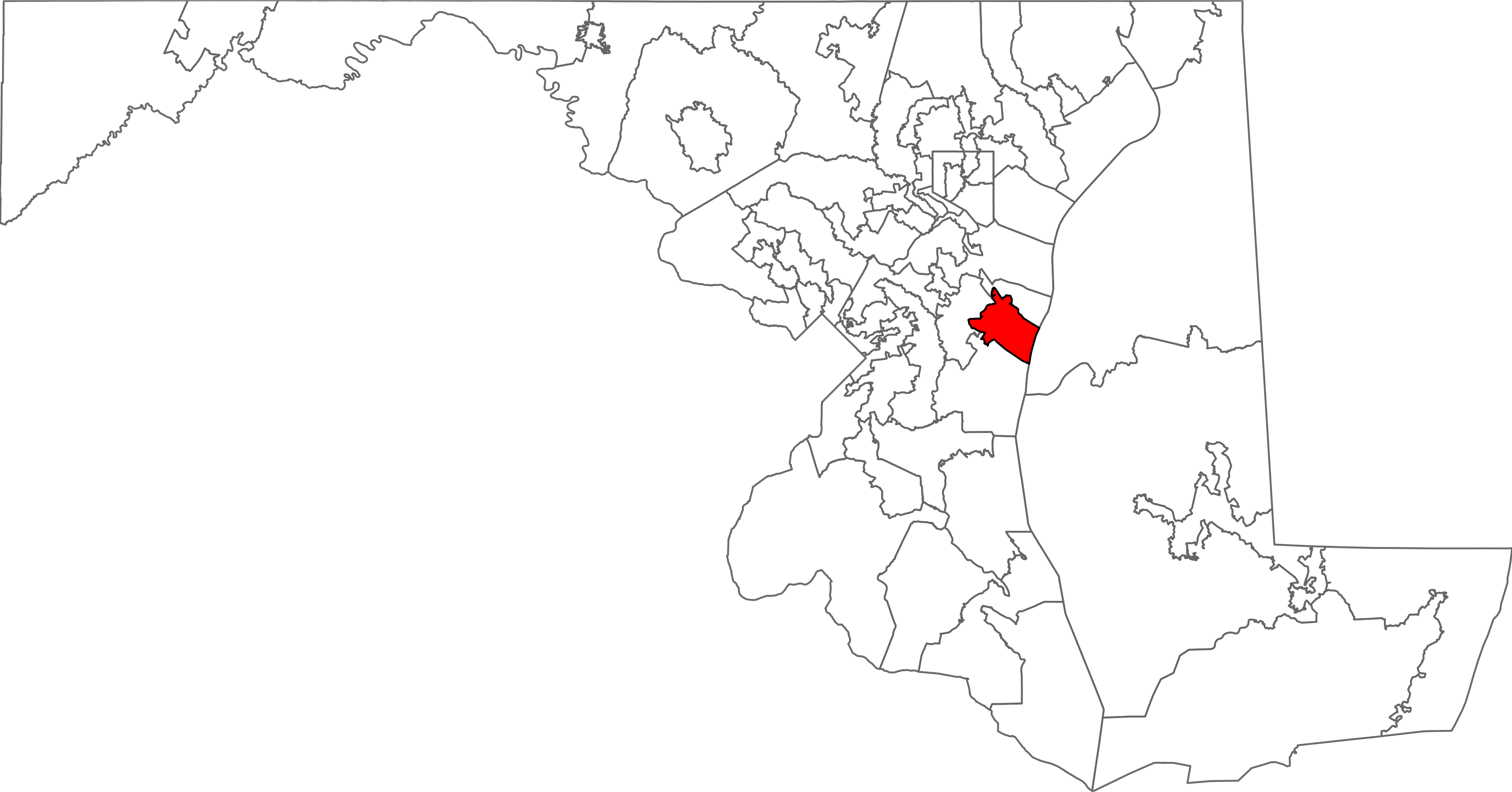
- Delegate(s): Dana Jones (D); Dylan Behler (D)
- Registration: 48.0% Democratic; 29.5% Republican; 21.1% unaffiliated
- Demographics: 66.8% White; 14.2% Black/African American; 0.5% Native American; 2.4% Asian; 0.0% Hawaiian/Pacific Islander; 8.5% Other race; 7.4% Two or more races; 14.7% Hispanic
- Population (2020): 82,120
- Voting-age population: 66,039
- Registered voters: 59,387

Maryland House of Delegates District 30A is one of the 71 districts that compose the Maryland House of Delegates. Along with subdistrict 30B, it makes up the 30th district of the Maryland Senate. District 30A includes part of Anne Arundel County, and is represented by two delegates.

== Demographic characteristics ==
As of the 2020 United States census, the district had a population of 82,120, of whom 66,039 (80.4%) were of voting age. The racial makeup of the district was 54,897 (66.8%) White, 11,659 (14.2%) African American, 411 (0.5%) Native American, 1,994 (2.4%) Asian, 37 (0.0%) Pacific Islander, 7,015 (8.5%) from some other race, and 6,111 (7.4%) from two or more races. Hispanic or Latino of any race were 12,035 (14.7%) of the population.

The district had 59,387 registered voters as of October 17, 2020, of whom 12,550 (21.1%) were registered as unaffiliated, 17,524 (29.5%) were registered as Republicans, 28,478 (48.0%) were registered as Democrats, and 443 (0.7%) were registered to other parties.

== Past Election Results ==
=== 2014 ===
Name	Party	Votes	Percent	Outcome
Herbert H. McMillan	Republican	14,484	27.9%	Won
Michael E. Busch	Democratic	14,289	27.6%	Won
Chuck Ferrar	Democratic	11,932	23.0%	Lost
Genevieve Lindner	Republican	11,100	21.4%	Lost
Other Write-Ins		56	0.1%	

=== 2018 ===
Name	Party	Votes	Percent	Outcome
Michael E. Busch	Democratic	20,080	32.6%	Won
Alice J. Cain	Democratic	18,070	29.3%	Won
Chelsea Gill	Republican	12,097	19.6%	Lost
Bob O'Shea	Republican	11,324	18.4%	Lost
Other Write-Ins		53	0.1%	
