= Dana Jones (politician) =

American politician (born 1976)

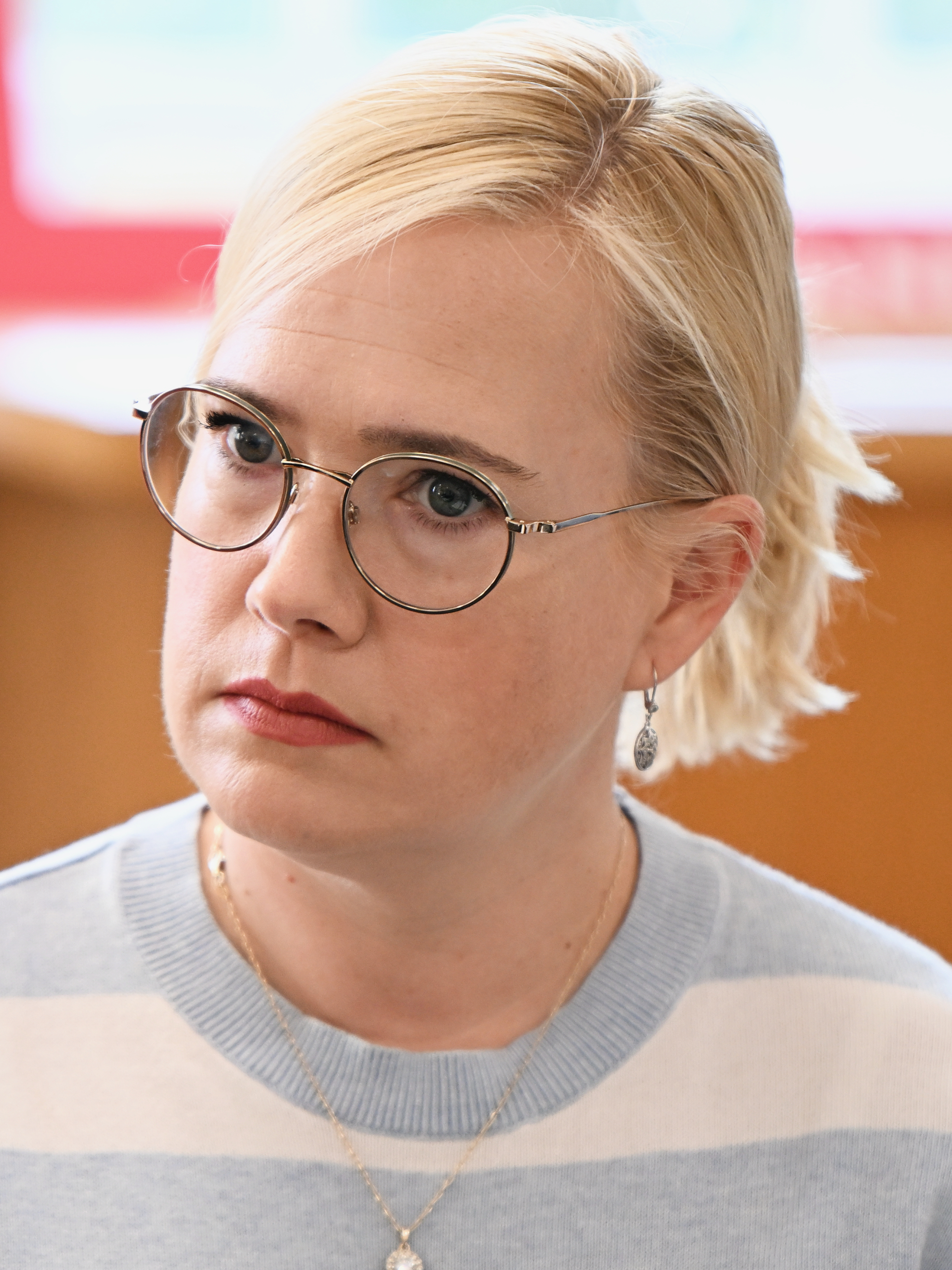
- Jones in 2023

Member of the Maryland House of Delegates from the 30A district
- Incumbent
- Assumed office May 1, 2020 Serving with Dylan Behler
- Appointed by: Larry Hogan
- Preceded by: Alice J. Cain

Personal details
- Born: Dana Celeste Jones; June 26, 1976 (age 50) Cumberland, Maryland, U.S.
- Party: Democratic
- Spouse: Jude Meche
- Children: 1
- Education: Towson University (BS)
- Website: Campaign website

Dana Celeste Jones (born June 26, 1976) is an American politician who is a Democratic member of the Maryland House of Delegates from District 30A.

== Background ==
Jones was born in Cumberland, Maryland, on June 6, 1976. Her mother was a longtime member of the Allegany County Democratic Central Committee and her father was the president of the local American Postal Workers Union. Jones graduated from Fort Hill High School and attended Towson University, where she earned her Bachelor of Science degree in sociology in 1998.

Jones first became involved in politics while in college, where she was a member of the university's College Democrats organization and worked as a campaign manager for Robert Zirkin's 1998 House of Delegates campaign. Afterwards, she worked as a legislative aide to U.S. Representative Ben Cardin until 2001, when she began working as a senior researcher for the Democratic Congressional Campaign Committee and later for EMILY's List. Jones has worked as an independent political consultant since 2013.

During the 2018 Anne Arundel County executive election, Jones worked on Steuart Pittman's campaign and helped him prepare for debates against Steve Schuh.

== In the legislature ==
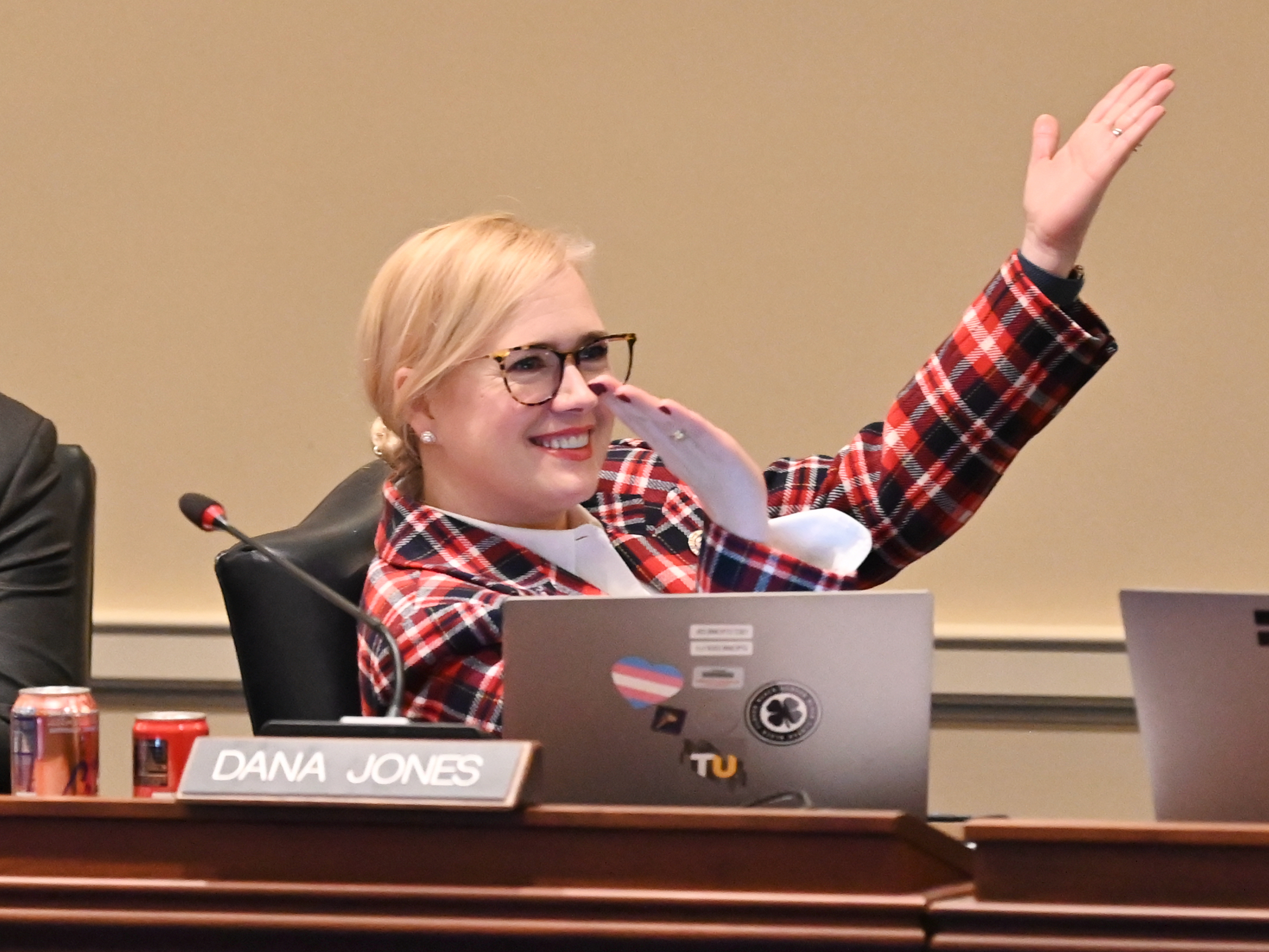
Jones in the House Appropriations Committee, 2024

In April 2020, following the resignation of state delegate Alice J. Cain at the end of the 2020 legislative session, Jones applied to serve the remainder of Cain's term in the Maryland House of Delegates. The Anne Arundel County Democratic Central Committee voted to recommend Jones to the seat later that month, and she was appointed by Governor Larry Hogan on April 23, 2020.

Jones was sworn into the Maryland House of Delegates on May 1, 2020, and was elected to a full four-year term in 2022. She was a member of the Ways and Means Committee from 2020 to 2023, afterwards serving in the Appropriations Committee. In 2023, she swapped assignments with state delegate Shaneka Henson after questions were raised about a potential conflict of interest involving Henson's legal work for a nonprofit which received state funding.

Jones was a delegate to the 2024 Democratic National Convention, pledged to Kamala Harris.

In November 2024, after state senator Sarah Elfreth won election to the U.S. House of Representatives, Jones said she would apply to serve the remainder of Elfreth's term in the Maryland Senate. Jones campaigned on her legislative record and highlighted her work toward reproductive health and LGBTQ+ rights while contending for the seat. She also said that she planned to run for the Maryland Senate in 2026 if the Anne Arundel County Democratic Central Committee decided against appointing her to the seat. The Anne Arundel County Democratic Central Committee nominated state delegate Shaneka Henson to fill the remainder of Elfreth's term on January 4, 2025, by a vote of 10–9.

During the Anne Arundel County Democratic Central Committee's meeting to select a candidate to fill Elfreth's Senate seat, Jones faced allegations that she had failed to report a payment or in-kind contribution to the Annapolis Maritime Museum—a location for which she had sponsored a $150,000 bond request a year earlier—for renting its event venue for an October 2023 fundraiser. Jones rejected these accusations and later provided Maryland Matters with images of two canceled checks related to the event, with one showing that her campaign committee paid the museum $850 for the use of the venue for the fundraiser; however, these checks included Jones's signature at the bottom of the payments, suggesting that she may have violated state campaign finance laws that prohibit candidates from having access to campaign funds or disbursing funds.

== Political positions ==
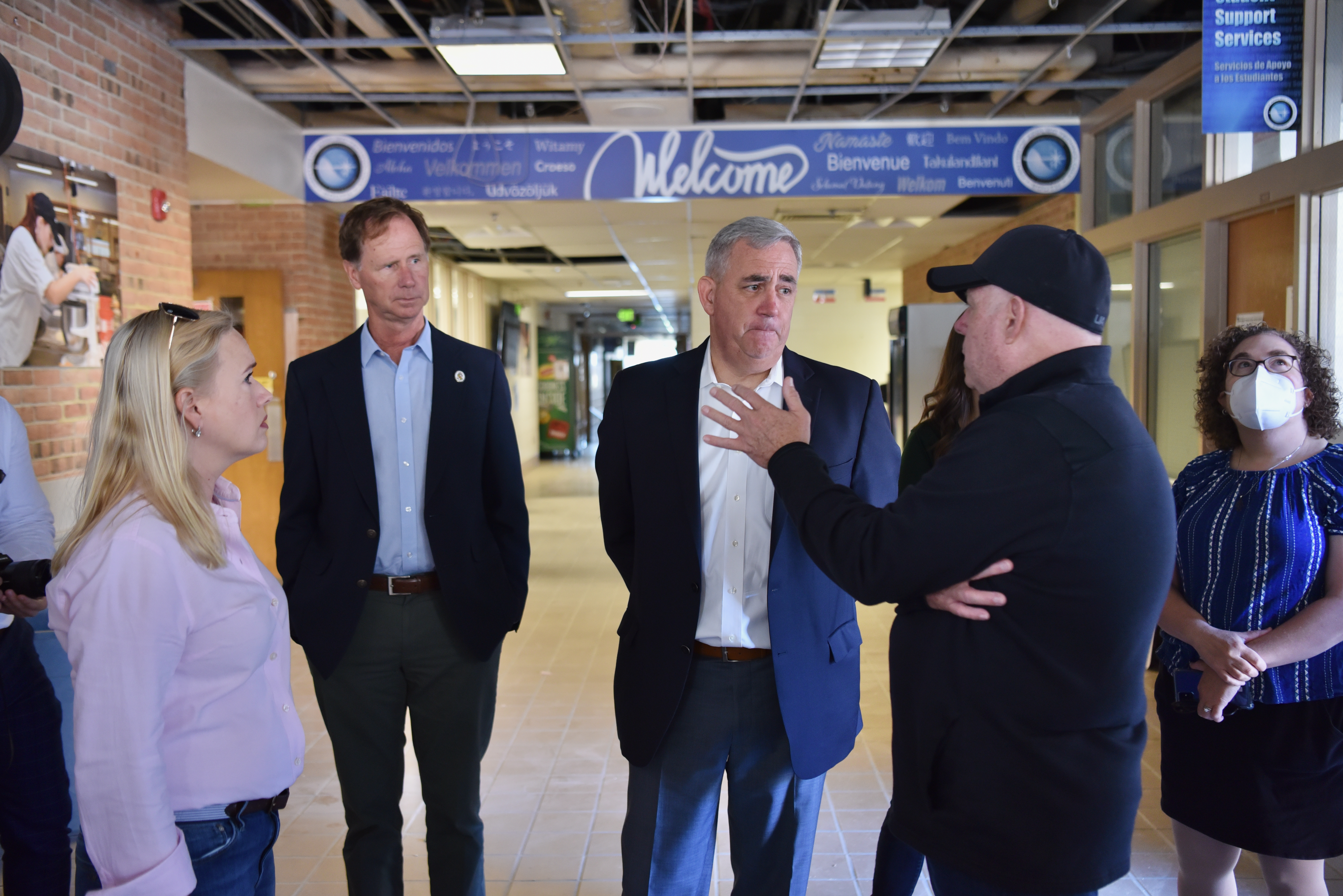
Jones inspecting damage to South River High School following Hurricane Ida with Governor Larry Hogan, 2021

Rick Hutzell of The Baltimore Banner has described Jones as a progressive. Upon being sworn into the Maryland House of Delegates, Jones said she would prioritize health care, small business, and food insecurity. In August 2020, she participated in a protest supporting a federal bill to provide the United States Postal Service with $25 billion in funding ahead of the 2020 presidential election.

=== Education ===
During the 2021 legislative session, Jones introduced a bill to regulate school bus capacity.

=== Fiscal issues ===
In 2023, Jones introduced a bill to establish a State Disaster Recovery Fund to help jurisdictions recover from natural disasters. The bill passed and was signed into law by Governor Wes Moore. She also supported a bill requiring the Maryland Department of Health to cover the cost of certain at-home therapies for children facing complex mental health issues.

=== Social issues ===
In April 2021, Jones participated in a rally to celebrate the sentencing of Derek Chauvin.

In October 2021, Jones participated in a protest in Annapolis to support abortion rights amid red states passing bills to ban abortions. During the 2023 legislative session, she voted for Question 1, a voter referendum that established a right to reproductive freedom in the Constitution of Maryland, and campaigned heavily for the referendum during the 2024 elections.

During the 2022 legislative session, Jones introduced legislation to exempt baby care products from the state sales tax. The bill passed and was signed into law by Governor Larry Hogan.

== Personal life ==
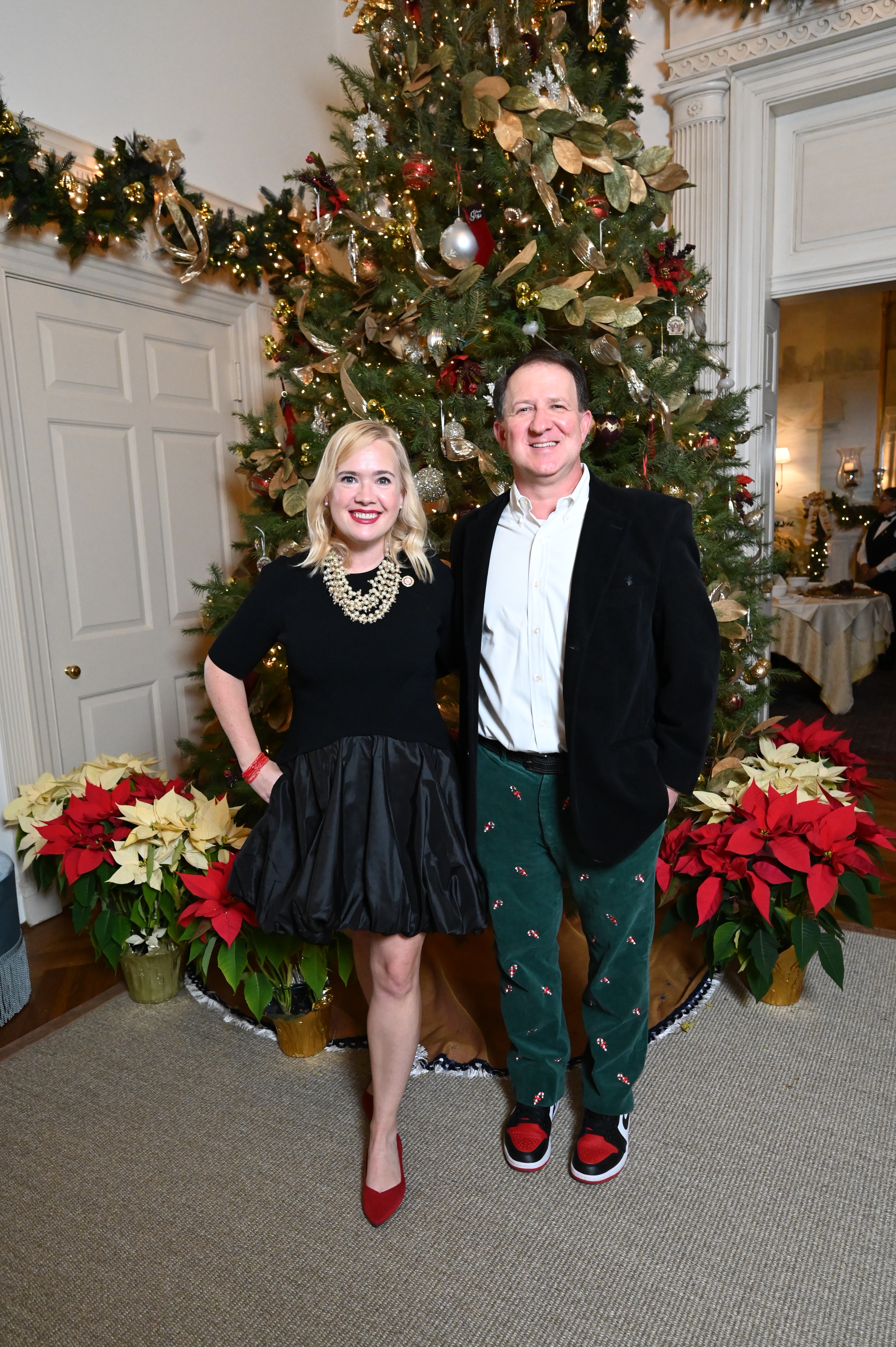
Jones and her husband Jude at a Government House holiday reception, 2024

Jones is married to her husband, Jude Meche. Together, they have a son.

== Electoral history ==
Maryland House of Delegates District 30A Democratic primary election, 2022
Party	Candidate	Votes	%
Democratic	Shaneka Henson (incumbent)	8,665	52.2
Democratic	Dana Jones (incumbent)	7,925	47.8

Maryland House of Delegates District 30A election, 2022
Party	Candidate	Votes	%
Democratic	Shaneka Henson (incumbent)	20,364	32.1
Democratic	Dana Jones (incumbent)	19,710	31.1
Republican	Doug Rathell	12,948	20.4
Republican	Rob Seyfferth	10,366	16.3
Write-in		66	0.1
