= Seth A. Howard =

American politician (born 1974)

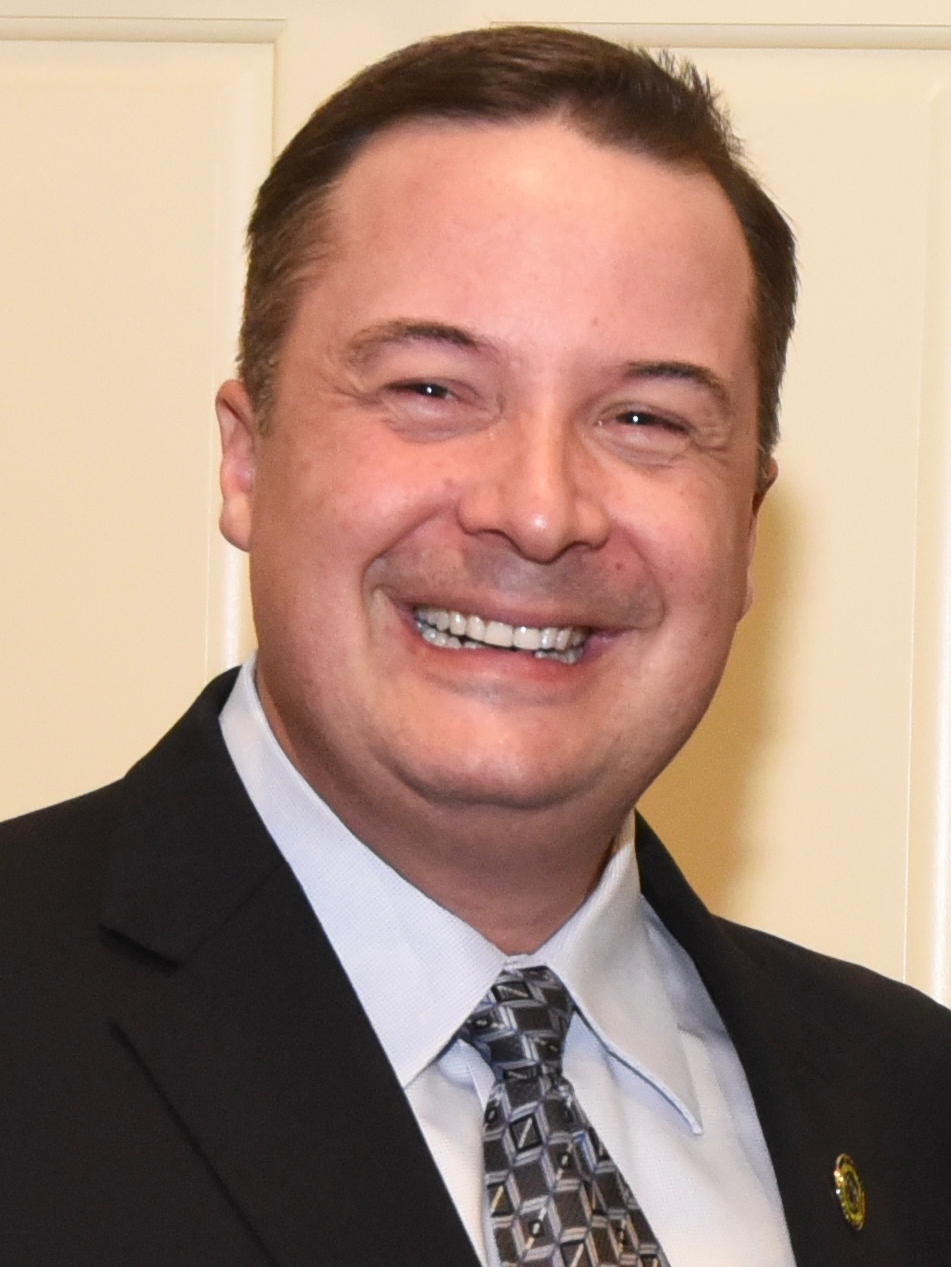

Member of the Maryland House of Delegates from the 30B district
- Incumbent
- Assumed office January 14, 2015
- Preceded by: Ron George

Personal details
- Born: Seth Adam Howard; March 17, 1974 (age 52) Cheverly, Maryland, U.S.
- Party: Republican
- Children: 1

Military service
- Branch/service: United States Marine Corps
- Years of service: 1994–1998
- Commands: 3rd Battalion, 6th Marines; 290th Military Police Co

Seth Adam Howard (born March 17, 1974) is an American politician who has served as a member of the Maryland House of Delegates from District 30B since 2015.

== Early life and career ==
Howard was born in Cheverly, Maryland on March 17, 1974. He graduated Glenelg High School, and afterwards served in the United States Marine Corps from 1994 to 1998, and in the Maryland Army National Guard from 1999 to 2003. Since 2004, Howard has owned the Broadleaf Tobacco and Smoke Shop in Severna Park, Maryland.

Howard ran for the Maryland House of Delegates in 2014, seeking to succeed delegate Robert A. Costa, who announced his intent to retire after redistricting moved him to District 33B. During the primary, the NRA Political Victory Fund endorsed his campaign with an 'AQ' rating. He defeated Anne Arundel County police lieutenant Jim Fredericks in the primary election, receiving 52 percent of the vote, and later defeated Democratic challenger Mitchelle Stephenson in the general election with 63.3 percent of the vote.

== In the legislature ==
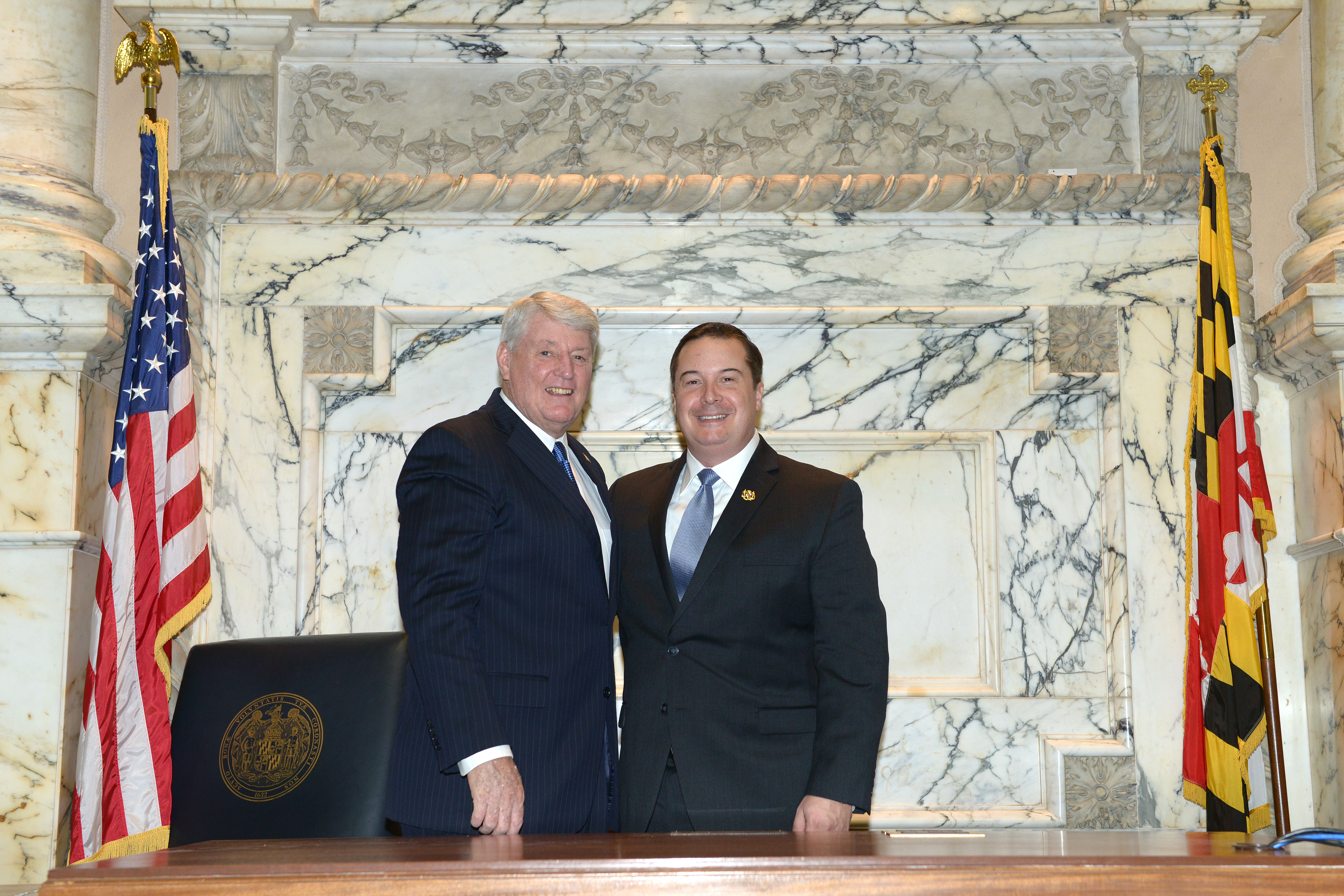
Howard is sworn into the Maryland House of Delegates by Speaker Michael E. Busch, 2015

Howard was sworn into the House of Delegates on January 14, 2015, and has served as a member of the Economic Matters Committee during his entire tenure. In January 2020, the American Conservative Union gave Howard a score of 63 percent, making him the lowest-scoring Republican in the Maryland House of Delegates.

Howard has served as the Deputy Minority Whip for the Maryland House Republican Caucus since 2021, filling a vacancy left by the election of Delegate Christopher T. Adams to serve as the House Minority Whip. In February 2021, Howard was appointed as the chairman of the Maryland House Republican Caucus' Business and Economic Committee.

In 2020, Howard was an alternate delegate for the Republican Party National Convention.

== Political positions ==
=== Business ===
In February 2017, Howard voted against a bill providing workers with up to seven days of paid sick leave a year, criticizing it as a burden for small businesses. During the 2018 legislative session, he introduced a bill that would require internet service providers to notify customers when their personal information is stolen in data breaches.

=== Gun policy ===
During the 2016 legislative session, Howard introduced legislation to reduce the county's archery safety zone to 50 yards.

In March 2018, during debate on a bill to ban bump stocks following the 2017 Las Vegas shooting, Howard introduced an amendment that would grandfather in already purchased bump stocks.

=== Housing ===
During the 2026 legislative session, Howard opposed a bill that would allow affordable housing construction on state-owned land close to mass transit areas, saying that the bill would remove local jurisdictions' ability to determine what projects should be allowed to break ground in their communities.

=== Minimum wage ===
During the 2016 legislative session, Howard voted against a bill banning wage discrimination on the basis of gender identity, pointing to existing federal protections against sex-based wage discrimination, including the Equal Pay Act of 1963 and the Lilly Ledbetter Fair Pay Act of 2009.

=== Social issues ===
In April 2018, after Meagan Simonaire delivered a speech on the House floor to support a bill banning conversion therapy for LGBT teens, Howard was one of four Anne Arundel County delegates to abstain from voting on the bill.

=== Taxes ===
During the 2021 legislative session, Howard voted against a bill that would allow the Anne Arundel County Council to pass a real estate transfer tax.

In August 2026, during debate on a proposed constitutional amendment on redistricting, Howard introduced an amendment that would restrict any revenues earned from vehicle taxes or fees to highway construction and maintenance.

== Personal life ==
Howard is married and has a child.

== Electoral history ==
Maryland House of Delegates District 30B Republican primary election, 2014
Party	Candidate	Votes	%
Republican	Seth Howard	1,398	52.1
Republican	Jim Fredericks	1,283	47.9

Maryland House of Delegates District 30B election, 2014
Party	Candidate	Votes	%
Republican	Seth Howard	9,496	63.3
Democratic	Mitchelle Stephenson	5,496	36.6
Write-in		10	0.1

Maryland House of Delegates District 30B election, 2018
Party	Candidate	Votes	%
Republican	Seth Howard (incumbent)	10,046	54.4
Democratic	Mike Shay	8,420	45.6
Write-in		17	0.1

Maryland House of Delegates District 30B election, 2022
Party	Candidate	Votes	%
Republican	Seth Howard (incumbent)	10,234	56.7
Democratic	Courtney L. Buiniskis	7,804	43.3
Write-in		6	0.0
