= Shaneka Henson =

American politician (born 1983)

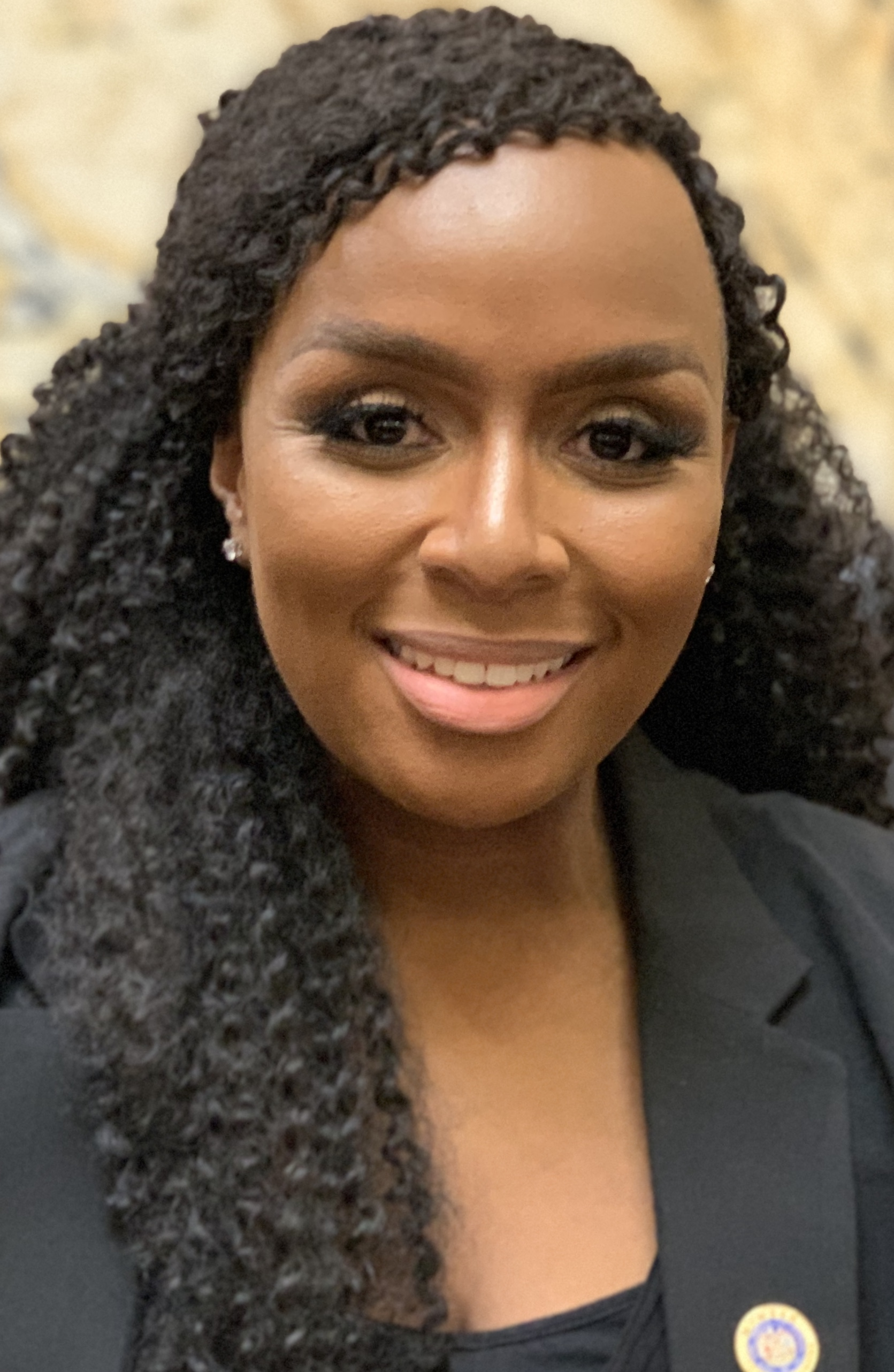

Member of the Maryland Senate from the 30th district
- Incumbent
- Assumed office January 8, 2025
- Appointed by: Wes Moore
- Preceded by: Sarah Elfreth

Member of the Maryland House of Delegates from the 30A district
- In office May 16, 2019 – January 8, 2025 Serving with Dana Jones
- Appointed by: Larry Hogan
- Preceded by: Michael E. Busch
- Succeeded by: Dylan Behler

Member of the Annapolis City Council from the 6th ward
- In office December 4, 2017 – April 29, 2019
- Preceded by: Kenny Kirby
- Succeeded by: DaJuan Gay

Personal details
- Born: Shaneka Tarae Henson; July 29, 1983 (age 43) Annapolis, Maryland, U.S.
- Party: Democratic
- Spouse: Marcus Johnson
- Children: 1
- Education: Coppin State University (BS); University of Baltimore (JD)
- Profession: Attorney

Shaneka Tarae Johnson (née Henson; born July 29, 1983) is an American politician and attorney who has served as a member of the Maryland Senate representing the 30th district since 2025. A member of the Democratic Party, she served Maryland House of Delegates representing District 30A from 2019 to 2025, and as an alderwoman on the Annapolis City Council from 2017 to 2019.

== Early life and education ==
Shaneka Tarae Henson was born in Annapolis, Maryland, on July 29, 1983. Her mother, Terry, and her father were both pastors at the New Life Presbyterian Church in Annapolis for fifteen years. She first became pregnant when she was 19-years-old attending Coppin State University and lived in public housing while raising her child. Henson graduated from Coppin with a Bachelor of Science degree, and the University of Baltimore with a Juris Doctor degree. Henson was admitted to the Maryland Bar in 2010, after which she worked as a practicing attorney for the Anne Arundel County State's Attorney's office and the YWCA. In 2020, she started her own law firm, Johnson Legal Group LLC.

In 2016, Henson graduated from a training course hosted by Emerge Maryland, an organization created to prepare potential female Democratic candidates for public office.

== Political career ==
=== Annapolis City Council ===
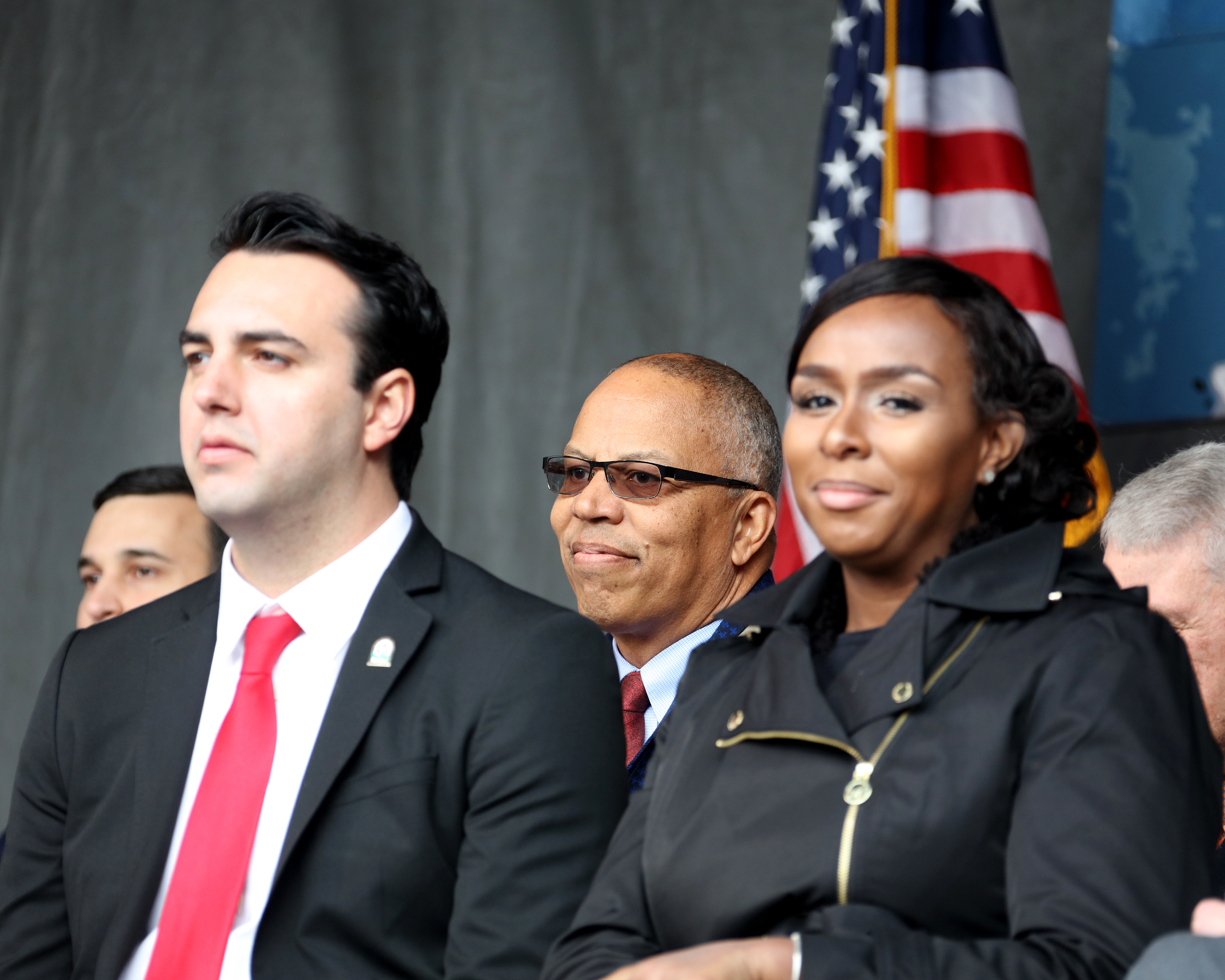
Henson at her inauguration, 2017

In 2016, Henson filed to run for the Annapolis City Council in ward 6, challenging incumbent Alderman Kenny Kirby, who later announced his retirement. In the Democratic primary, she faced challenger DaJuan Gay, whom she defeated with 67.8 percent of the vote. Henson ran unopposed in the general election, and was sworn in on December 4, 2017.

In October 2018, Annapolis mayor Gavin Buckley named Henson to serve as acting mayor for two weeks.

Henson resigned from the city council on April 29, 2019, after the Anne Arundel County Democratic Central Committee nominated her to the Maryland House of Delegates. She was succeeded by DaJuan Gay following a special election to fill her seat.

=== Maryland General Assembly ===
In April 2019, following the death of House Speaker Michael E. Busch, Henson applied to serve the remainder of his term in the Maryland House of Delegates. The Anne Arundel County Democratic Central Committee voted 11-1 to nominate her to fill the vacancy. Governor Larry Hogan appointed her to the seat on May 6, and she was sworn in on May 16. She is the first African-American woman to represent Annapolis in the Maryland House of Delegates. Henson was elected to a full four-year term in 2022.

Henson served on the Appropriations Committee from 2019 to 2023, after which she was switched to the Ways and Means Committee after questions were raised about a potential conflict of interest involving Henson's legal work for a nonprofit which received state funding. In April 2024, the Joint Committee on Legislative Ethics released a five-page letter condemning Henson's "ongoing practice" to hide her conflicts of interest, recommending to legislative leaders that she not be reassigned to the House Appropriations Committee and calling on her to apologize to the public. Henson released a statement on her website in response to the report that scolded members of the panel for failing to strike a more "collaborative and constructive tone" and contradicted some of the ethics panel's findings.

In November 2024, after state senator Sarah Elfreth won election to the U.S. House of Representatives, Henson said she would apply to serve the remainder of Elfreth's term in the Maryland Senate. Henson campaigned on the issues of maternal health, renter protections, and affordable childcare, and received endorsements from several Black lawmakers including Cory McCray and Gabriel Acevero. She also said that she planned to run for the seat in 2026 if the Anne Arundel County Democratic Central Committee did not nominate her to the seat. The Anne Arundel County Democratic Central Committee nominated Henson on January 4, 2025, by a vote of 10–9. Henson was sworn in on January 8, 2025, and is the first African-American woman to represent Anne Arundel County in the Maryland Senate. Henson won election to a full four-year term on November 3, 2026, after defeating Republican challenger Jessica Haire in the general election.

Henson was a member of the Senate Judicial Proceedings Committee from 2025 to 2027, afterwards serving on the Budget and Taxation Committee.

== Political positions ==
=== Criminal justice ===
Henson supports a "holistic approach" toward addressing crime, which includes addressing socioeconomic issues and tackling issues "from the law enforcement perspective".

During the 2020 legislative session, Henson introduced legislation to freeze child support orders of parents serving a prison sentence of six months or longer. The bill passed and became law. She introduced another bill to ease restrictions on when prosecutors could use hearsay evidence in witness intimidation cases.

=== Education ===
Henson supports the Blueprint for Maryland's Future. During the 2024 legislative session, she voted for the Freedom to Read Act—which prohibits public and school libraries from banning books based on partisan, ideological, or religious reasons, or based an author's origin, background, or views—but aggressively questioned the bill while it was in committee. After critics likened her questioning to the rhetoric of Moms for Liberty, Henson apologized to "anyone who thought I was targeting them or their life or who they choose to love".

=== Electoral reform ===
In July 2020, Henson criticized Governor Larry Hogan requiring voters to apply for a mail-in ballot if they did not want to vote in-person for the 2020 general election, saying that he had "stepped on people's voting rights". During the 2021 legislative session, she introduced legislation to ban guns at polling places and supported a bill requiring the automatic mailing of ballots to all registered voters.

In February 2026, Henson was one of two Democratic state senators to vote against a bill that would ban minority voter suppression and dilution in local and county elections. She also said she would support holding a floor vote on a bill that would redraw Maryland's congressional districts to improve the Democratic Party's chances of winning the 1st congressional district, the only congressional district held by Republicans in the state, but declined to say whether she would support mid-decade redistricting in Maryland.

=== Housing ===
During the 2020 legislative session, Henson introduced bills to establish statewide mold inspection standards, which did not receive a vote, and another to close a loophole that allowed Annapolis to avoid responsibility for inspecting its public housing units, which was signed into law by Governor Larry Hogan. In 2021, she introduced legislation to shield a tenant's eviction records from public view if they won an eviction case.

=== Social issues ===
During the 2020 legislative session, Henson supported the CROWN Act, which prohibits discrimination on the basis of hair style and texture.

Henson participated in George Floyd protests in Annapolis, Severn, and Shady Side. In July 2020, she spoke in support of federal legislation to recognize racism as a public health trauma and to make social security income, rental assistance, and Social Security Disability Insurance available to African Americans regardless of age or disability. Later that month, Henson signed onto a letter calling on regional news organizations to increase employee diversity.

During the 2021 legislative session, Henson supported a bill to make Juneteenth a state holiday.

In October 2021, Henson participated in and spoke at a protest in Annapolis to endorse legislation expansion to expand abortion rights in Maryland. However, during the 2022 legislative session, Henson voted against the Abortion Care Access Act, a bill to expand the kinds of health care practitioners that could perform abortions in Maryland and provide $3.5 million to train these professionals on performing the procedure, and voted to uphold Governor Larry Hogan's veto of the bill. She later told The Baltimore Banner that she had concerns with allowing nonphysicians to provide abortion care, but added that she might have voted for the bill if it only allowed nonphysicians to offer medical abortions and not abortion procedures. In June 2022, on the night following the U.S. Supreme Court's decision in Dobbs v. Jackson Women's Health Organization, Henson attended a protest in Annapolis against the court's ruling. During the 2023 legislative session, Henson voted for Question 1, a voter referendum that established a right to reproductive freedom in the Constitution of Maryland.

Henson supported efforts to repeal the gay panic defense and create a LGBTQ+ commission in state government. During the 2023 legislative session, Henson did not vote on the Trans Health Equity Act, which requires the state's Medicaid program to cover gender-affirming treatments, later saying that she had reservations about children receiving gender-affirming care. In 2024, she did not vote on the Trans Shield Act—which prevents states with anti-trans laws from prosecuting patients or entities within Maryland for providing gender-affirming care—but later said that she fully supports the bill's policies and skipping the vote on it was "an oversight".

Following the 2024 United States presidential election, Henson criticized Democrats for drifting too far into lightning-rod social issues, saying that she believed that pocketbook concerns would decide future elections.

=== Taxes ===
In February 2021, Henson was the only member of the Anne Arundel County Delegation to vote against a bill providing tax credits to businesses impacted by the COVID-19 pandemic.

During the 2022 legislative session, Henson introduced a bill to add critical medical devices, including thermometers, pulse oximeters, and blood pressure monitors, to the state's sales tax exemptions, which passed and was signed into law by Governor Larry Hogan.

== Personal life ==
Henson is married to her husband, Marcus Johnson. Together, they have a son. She is a Christian.

In May 2016, Henson settled a $1,889 state tax lien that had been placed against her.

== Electoral history ==
Annapolis City Council Ward 6 Democratic primary election, 2017
Party	Candidate	Votes	%
Democratic	Shaneka Henson	227	67.8
Democratic	DaJuan Gay	108	32.2

Annapolis City Council Ward 6 election, 2017
Party	Candidate	Votes	%
Democratic	Shaneka Henson	426	95.3
Write-in		21	4.7

Maryland House of Delegates District 30A Democratic primary election, 2022
Party	Candidate	Votes	%
Democratic	Shaneka Henson (incumbent)	8,665	52.2
Democratic	Dana Jones (incumbent)	7,925	47.8

Maryland House of Delegates District 30A election, 2022
Party	Candidate	Votes	%
Democratic	Shaneka Henson (incumbent)	20,364	32.1
Democratic	Dana Jones (incumbent)	19,710	31.1
Republican	Doug Rathell	12,948	20.4
Republican	Rob Seyfferth	10,366	16.3
Write-in		66	0.1
