= Sarah Elfreth =

American politician (born 1988)

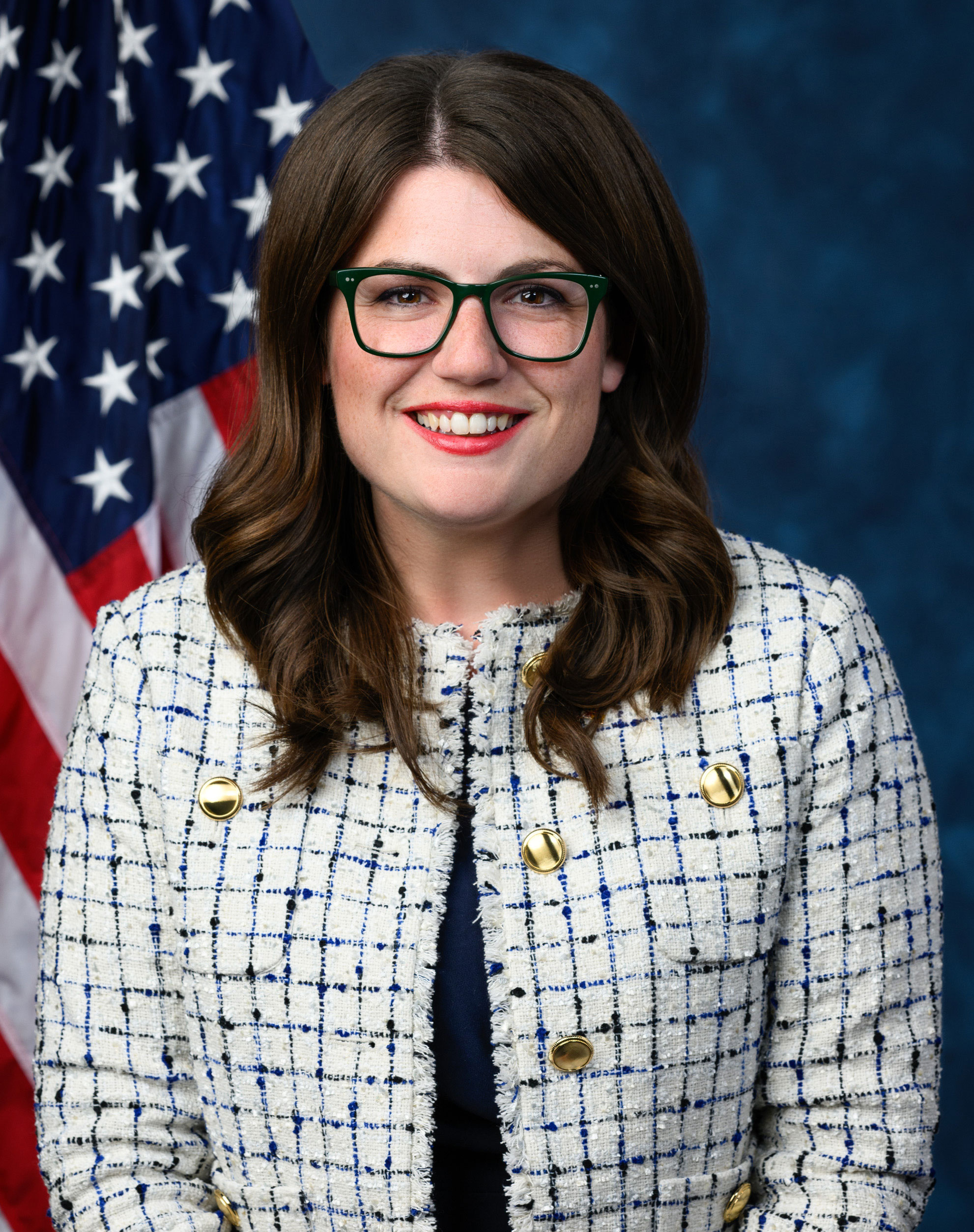
- Official portrait, 2025

Member of the U.S. House of Representatives from Maryland's 3rd district
- Incumbent
- Assumed office January 3, 2025
- Preceded by: John Sarbanes

Member of the Maryland Senate from the 30th district
- In office January 9, 2019 – January 2, 2025
- Preceded by: John Astle
- Succeeded by: Shaneka Henson

Personal details
- Born: Sarah Kelly Elfreth; September 9, 1988 (age 38) Barrington, New Jersey, U.S.
- Party: Democratic
- Spouse: Eric Costello (m. 2026)
- Education: Towson University (BA); Johns Hopkins University (MPP)
- Website: House website Campaign website
- Elfreth's voice Elfreth on Earth Day and the Chesapeake Bay. Recorded April 22, 2025

Sarah Kelly Elfreth (/ˈɛlfrəθ/, ELF-rəth; born September 9, 1988) is an American politician who is serving as the U.S. representative for Maryland's 3rd congressional district since 2025. A member of the Democratic Party, she represented the 30th district in the Maryland Senate from 2019 to 2025.

Born and raised in New Jersey, Elfreth moved to Maryland to study political science at Towson University and later earn a MPP from Johns Hopkins University. She became involved with Maryland politics while attending Towson, during which she was appointed by Governor Martin O'Malley to be a student member of the University System of Maryland Board of Regents.

After graduating, Elfreth moved to Annapolis, where she successfully ran for the Maryland Senate in 2018, defeating Republican challenger and former state delegate Ron George in the general election. She was reelected in 2022. Her district encompassed the lower half of Anne Arundel County, including the state capital of Annapolis. In 2024, Elfreth won the 22-way Democratic primary in the U.S. House of Representatives election in Maryland's 3rd congressional district and then defeated the Republican nominee in the general election. She was sworn in on January 3, 2025.

== Early life and career ==
Elfreth with U.S. representative Steny Hoyer, 2011

=== Early life and education ===
Elfreth was born and raised in Barrington, New Jersey, where her stepfather worked as a locomotive engineer and her mother worked as a probation officer. Her grandfather served in the Korean and Vietnam wars, and later suffered from post-traumatic stress disorder. She is of English descent and is a descendant of Jeremiah Elfreth, who was the namesake of Elfreth's Alley in Philadelphia.

Elfreth graduated from Haddon Heights High School in 2006, and attended Towson University on scholarship, where she served as a resident assistant, submitted a thesis on how having students participate in governing boards can make them more effective, and received a Bachelor of Arts degree in political science in 2010. In 2012, she earned her Master of Science degree in public policy from Johns Hopkins University, where she worked as a research assistant in the Office of Government and Community Affairs from 2010 to 2012. Since 2019, Elfreth has taught as an adjunct professor for Towson University's Honors College.

=== Early political career ===
Elfreth became active in politics while attending Towson University, when she became involved with student government and began traveling to Annapolis to lobby the Maryland General Assembly. She also worked as a summer intern for state senator James Rosapepe. In 2009, Maryland governor Martin O'Malley appointed Elfreth to be the student member of the University System Board of Regents. She didn't become involved with electoral politics until her senior year at Towson, after hearing a speech by former Vermont Governor Madeleine Kunin. She served as a congressional intern for House Minority Whip Steny Hoyer in 2011 before working as a lobbyist for the National Aquarium and Johns Hopkins University.

After moving to Annapolis, Elfreth became involved with local politics, becoming a member of the Ward 1 Residents Association and serving on the District 30 Democratic Club, and volunteering for the campaigns of multiple local Democratic officials. Before running for the Maryland Senate, she worked as a senior director for Margrave Strategies, a consulting firm founded by former Howard County Executive Kenneth Ulman.

== Maryland Senate ==
In June 2017, Elfreth filed to run for Maryland Senate, seeking to succeed state senator John Astle, who did not seek re-election to run for mayor of Annapolis. During the Democratic primary, she ran on a slate with House Speaker Michael E. Busch, whom she would later cite as her political mentor. Elfreth was elected to the Maryland Senate with 53.8 percent of the vote against former state delegate Ron George.

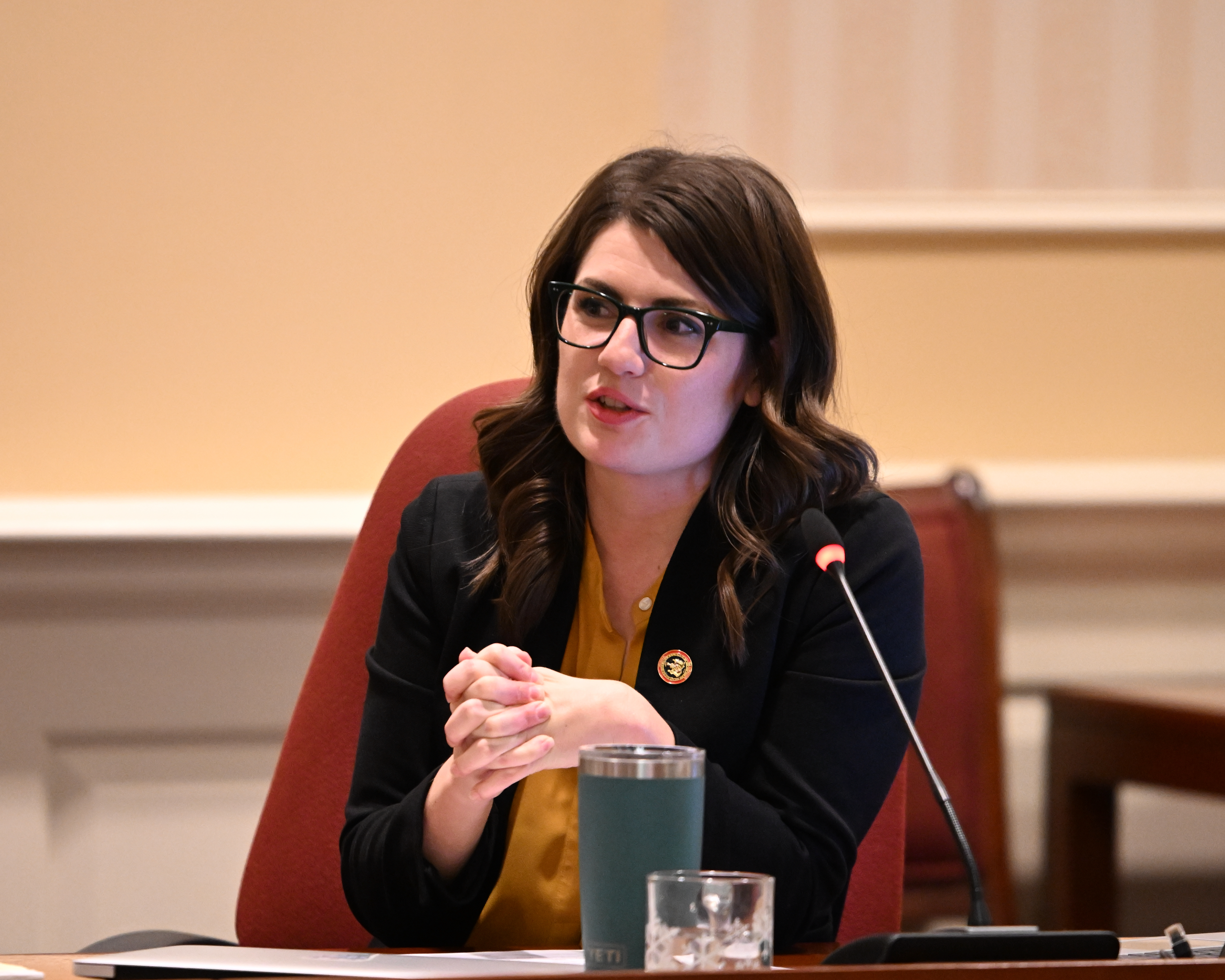
Elfreth in the Budget and Taxation Committee, 2023

Elfreth was sworn into the Maryland Senate on January 9, 2019. As of 2024, she is the youngest woman ever to serve in the Maryland Senate. Elfreth was a member of the Budget and Taxation Committee—including as the chair of its Pensions and Public Safety, Transportation, and Environment subcommittee and as a member of its Capital Budget subcommittee—and was the chair of the Joint Committee on the Chesapeake and Atlantic Coastal Bay Critical Areas and Joint Subcommittee on Program Open Space and Agricultural Land Preservation. She was regarded as one of the most productive members of the legislature, having passed 84 bills during her tenure, more than any other legislator during that time.

Elfreth served as an at-large delegate to the 2020 and 2024 Democratic National Conventions. As of May 2024, she had plans to campaign for Joe Biden in Pennsylvania during the 2024 presidential election. In 2022, Elfreth served as the chair of the Chesapeake Executive Council. In this position, Elfreth whipped votes from members of the Pennsylvania General Assembly on legislation to commit some coronavirus relief funding to agricultural cleanup programs.

Elfreth resigned from the Maryland Senate on January 2, 2025. Her successor, state delegate Shaneka Henson, was nominated by the Anne Arundel County Democratic Central Committee on January 4, 2025, and appointed to the seat by Governor Wes Moore a few days later. Elfreth remained neutral in the process to pick her successor.

== U.S. House of Representatives ==
=== Elections ===
==== 2024 ====
On November 4, 2023, Elfreth announced that she would run for the U.S. House of Representatives in Maryland's 3rd congressional district to succeed John Sarbanes, who had announced his retirement a week before. During the Democratic primary, which developed into a three-way race between Elfreth, Clarence Lam, and Harry Dunn, Elfreth campaigned on environmental issues, abortion rights, and healthcare, and received support from U.S. Senators Barbara Mikulski and Ben Cardin, and from several Anne Arundel County-based legislators.

Elfreth won the Democratic primary election on May 14, 2024, and defeated Republican nominee Rob Steinberger in the general election on November 5, 2024. She is the youngest woman ever elected to the U.S. House of Representatives from Maryland. She and April McClain Delaney are the first women to represent Maryland in the U.S. House of Representatives since 2016, when Donna Edwards retired to unsuccessfully run for the U.S. Senate.

==== 2026 ====
Elfreth won renomination in the June Democratic primary defeating four challengers to advance to the general election. She went on to win the general election, securing her second term in office.

=== Tenure ===
Elfreth was sworn in on January 3, 2025. Before the start of the 119th Congress, Elfreth unsuccessfully ran for freshman class representative for the Democratic Caucus, placing second in a three way race that included California freshman U.S. Representative-elect Luz Rivas and Washington freshman U.S. Representative-elect Emily Randall.

=== Committee assignments ===
For the 119th Congress:

- Committee on Armed Services
  - Subcommittee on Readiness
  - Subcommittee on Seapower and Projection Forces
- Committee on Natural Resources
  - Subcommittee on Energy and Mineral Resources
  - Subcommittee on Water, Wildlife and Fisheries

=== Caucus memberships ===
- Congressional Caucus for Women's Issues
- Congressional Equality Caucus
- Future Forum
- Labor Caucus
- New Democrat Coalition

== Political positions ==
According to a VoteHub analysis, Elfreth voted with President Donald Trump's stated position 11.9% of the time in the 119th Congress through 2025.

=== Crime and policing ===
During the 2021 legislative session, Elfreth voted for the Maryland Police Accountability Act and supported an unsuccessful Republican amendment to the bill that would require law enforcement agencies to keep a record of positive community feedback. During debate on a bill to give the attorney general of Maryland prosecutorial power in police-involved deaths in 2023, Elfreth voted for amendments that would allow state's attorneys to decide first whether to prosecute a case, and another to appoint a director of the investigations division. Both amendments were rejected in largely party-line votes. In June 2023, following a shooting in Annapolis that left three dead and another three injured, Elfreth attended a vigil to honor the victims of the attack and endorsed calls for accountability from state legislators.

=== Education ===
During her tenure as the student member of the University System of Maryland Board of Regents, Elfreth voted against a three percent tuition increase and spoke in support of Governor Martin O'Malley's four-year tuition freeze. She also played a role in gathering opposition to a resolution recommending against a policy on pornographic films following the screening of Pirates II: Stagnetti's Revenge at the University of Maryland, College Park, convincing other board members that there was no way to create such a policy without infringing on freedom of speech. During the 2019 legislative session, Elfreth introduced legislation to expand the Board of Regents' membership and implement additional oversight reforms. The bill passed both chambers unanimously and was signed into law by Governor Hogan on April 30, 2019.

During her 2024 congressional campaign, Elfreth campaigned for school board candidates running against candidates endorsed by Moms for Liberty, saying that she viewed the "threat Moms for Liberty poses to our boards of education as one of the greatest threats to democracy." In October 2024, after The Baltimore Banner reported that Anne Arundel County school board candidate Chuck Yocum had a history of child sexual abuse charges stemming from his teaching job at Northeast High School, Elfreth called for Yocum to drop out of the school board race. Yocum was narrowly defeated by Erica McFarland in the general election on November 5, 2024. In March 2025, was one of 31 Democrats to vote for the DETERRENT Act, which lowers the foreign reporting thresholds for colleges and prohibits universities from working with "countries of concern" without annual approval from the U.S. Secretary of Education.

=== Electoral and ethics reform ===
While a student at Towson University, Elfreth testified in support of a bill to increase polling places at college campuses and make it easier for college students to register to vote. During the 2021 legislative session, she introduced the "Student and Military Voter Empowerment Act", which would require higher education institutions to create websites to provide students with voting information and allow military members to register to vote using their Department of Defense Common Access Card. The bill passed and became law without Governor Larry Hogan's signature on May 30, 2021.

During the 2021 legislative session, Elfreth introduced legislation to create an "Office of Digital Inclusion" in the Maryland Department of Housing and Community Development. The bill passed and was signed into law by Governor Hogan on April 13, 2021. She also introduced legislation that would require the state's Commission on Environmental Justice and sustainable Communities to "reflect the racial, gender, ethnic, and geographic diversity of the state". The bill passed and became law on May 30, 2021.

During debate on a bill that would allow the Maryland State Board of Elections to tabulate mail-in ballots before election day in 2022, Elfreth was one of two Democratic state senators to vote for a Republican amendment that would have limited people to picking up and delivering only 10 ballots for other voters. During her 2024 congressional campaign, Elfreth was the only candidate in the race who expressed openness to accepting campaign contributions from corporate political action committees, saying that she would accept donations from corporations within the district. She said she would support campaign finance reforms if elected to Congress, referencing Sarbanes's For the People Act.

=== Environment ===
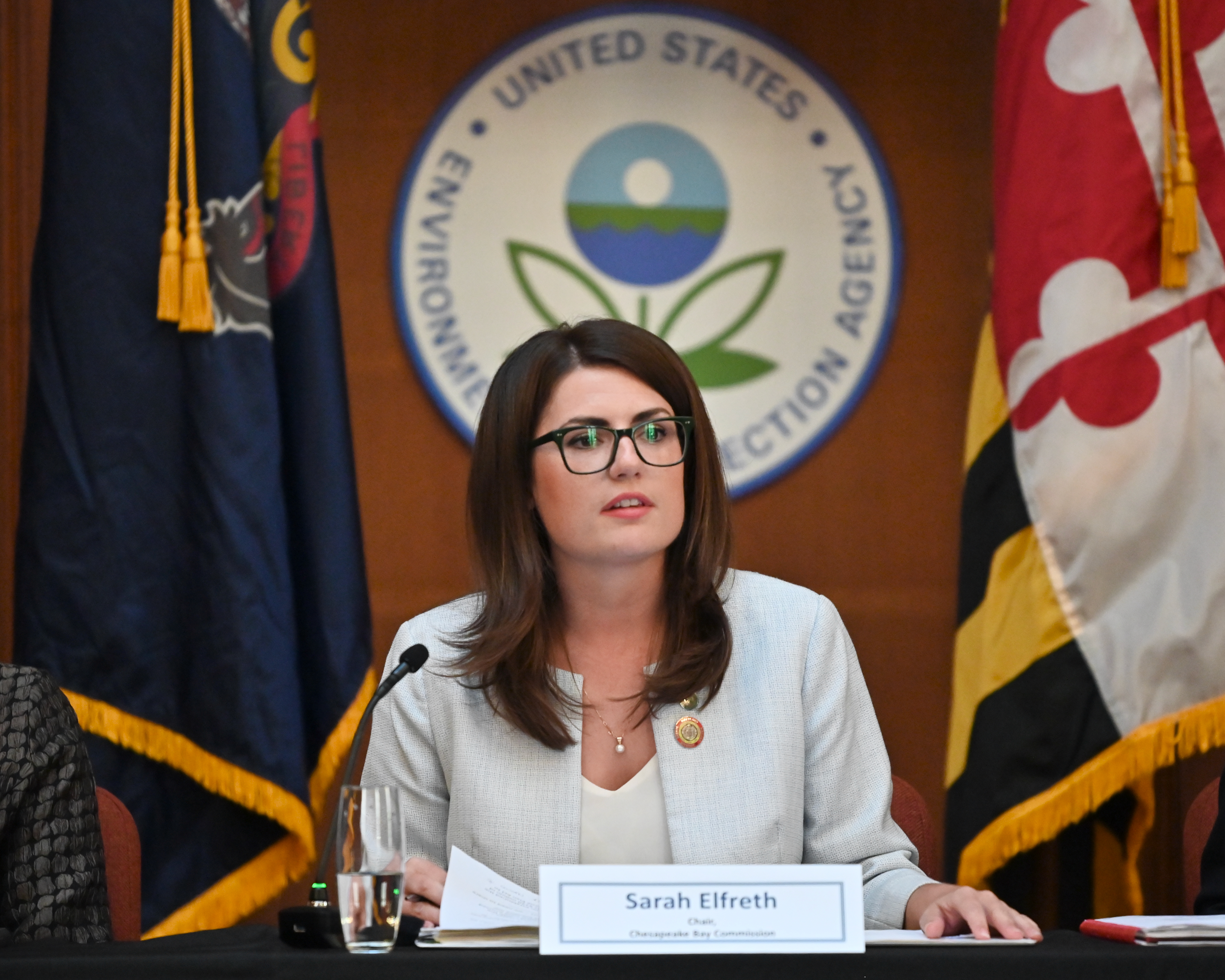
Elfreth as chair of the Chesapeake Executive Council, 2022

During the 2020 legislative session, Elfreth proposed legislation to allow jurisdictions to create Resilience Authorities to provide funding to large infrastructure projects related to sea level rise, nuisance flooding, and erosion. She also co-sponsored legislation to expand the public's role in rehabilitation projects in the Chesapeake Bay Bridge resurfacing project.

During the 2021 legislative session, Elfreth introduced various environmental bills, including bills that would require Maryland to switch to safer alternatives in firefighting foam and ban PFAS chemicals in food packaging, and expand the state's clean energy loan program to include water efficiency projects, environmental remediation projects, and climate resilience projects.

During the 2022 legislative session, Elfreth introduced legislation that would require the Maryland State Retirement and Pensions System to consider climate change as a financial factor when making investment decisions. The bill passed and became law on April 9, 2022. In 2023, Elfreth introduced a bill to establish a State Disaster Recovery Fund to help jurisdictions recover from natural disasters. The bill passed and was signed into law by Governor Wes Moore. During the 2024 legislative session, Elfreth was one of three senators to vote against a bill to ease restrictions around backup generators for data centers in Maryland.

=== Foreign policy ===
==== Iran ====
In June 2025, after the American strikes on Iranian nuclear sites, Elfreth said that Iran should not be allowed to become a nuclear power while expressing concern that the attacks would bring the United States into another "unnecessary conflict" in the Middle East, noting that four presidents have waged war under the Authorization for Use of Military Force of 2001. In February 2026, she criticized further U.S. and Israeli strikes against Iran, saying the attacks lacked "clarity, legal justification, or consultation of Congress".

==== Israel ====
Elfreth supports a two-state solution to the Israeli–Palestinian conflict and strengthening Israel–United States relations. She opposes conditioning U.S. aid to Israel, saying that she believed that "all nations have a responsibility in supporting humanitarian aid to the region as the only way to begin the very long road towards a peaceful two-state solution". During her 2024 congressional campaign, she supported a permanent ceasefire in the Gaza war conditioned on the return of Hamas-held hostages and the provision of additional humanitarian aid, but criticized "unbalanced and nuanced" state and local resolutions calling for a ceasefire. She also expressed concerns with some of Israel Prime Minister Benjamin Netanyahu's public statements during the war, but said that conversations on Israel's leadership and governance should be handled in private between it and the United States.

Elfreth traveled to Israel for the first time in July 2023, visiting locations including an Iron Dome battery, the West Bank, religious sites, and a Hezbollah tunnel on the Lebanese border. She met with a Palestinian National Authority official during her visit, after which she expressed concerns with "some verbiage" used by the official and an evasive answer about the authority's failure to hold elections in the region. Elfreth was supposed to attend an AIPAC-sponsored trip to Israel during the Congressional summer recess of 2025, but withdrew to spend time with her family.

During her 2024 congressional campaign, Elfreth supported an amendment introduced by U.S. senator Chris Van Hollen that would condition U.S. foreign aid on a country's compliance with international law, though a spokesperson clarified her belief "that Israel is acting in accordance with these laws", and later reiterated that she would only support requiring countries to comply with existing conditions as opposed to establishing new conditions. In July 2025, she issued a statement calling on Israel to "take immediate action to address the need to protect civilian lives and allow the sustained and unimpeded access to aid and food" amid increasing warnings about the famine in Gaza. In January 2025, Elfreth voted against a bill to place sanctions on the International Criminal Court (ICC) for issuing arrest warrants against Netanyahu and former Israeli Defense Minister Yoav Gallant. Following the vote, she signed onto a letter to the president of the ICC calling on the court to rescind its arrest warrants against Israeli leaders. In July 2026, Elfreth was one of 10 Democrats to vote "present" on an amendment to end U.S. aid to Israel.

==== Russia ====
In September 2026, Elfreth was one of three members of the Maryland's congressional delegation to vote for the Sanctioning Russia Act.

==== Ukraine ====
In February 2025, Elfreth condemned comments made by President Donald Trump blaming Ukraine for Russia's invasion and calling Ukrainian President Volodymyr Zelenskyy a dictator, but said that she agreed with the president's calls for members of NATO to invest more into the security of Europe.

==== Venezuela ====
In December 2025, Elfreth criticized U.S. military strikes on alleged drug traffickers in the Caribbean Sea, expressing concerns over the lack of due process in the strikes and calling for a public hearing to ensure the strikes would not spark a war in South America. In January 2026, she criticized U.S. military strikes in Venezuela and the subsequent capture of Venezuelan president Nicolás Maduro, saying that the American people "do not want another regime change war" and that the strikes did not have any form of congressional approval.

=== Gun policy ===
In June 2023, Elfreth spoke in support of the Gun Safety Act, which increased the requirements and fees to obtain handgun permits and limited where gun owners could carry their weapons. During the 2024 legislative session, Elfreth introduced a bill to levy an eleven percent excise tax on firearm sales to fund the state's trauma system.

=== Healthcare ===
In June 2024, Elfreth signed onto a Maryland Healthcare for All pledge to support legislation to extend Inflation Reduction Act-provided healthcare benefits beyond 2025.

=== Immigration ===
In January 2026, Elfreth supported an effort to impeach U.S. Homeland Security Secretary Kristi Noem, saying that during Noem's tenure, the U.S. Department of Homeland Security and U.S. Immigration and Customs Enforcement (ICE) "violated the rights and privacy of Americans, terrorized our cities, and obstructed Congress". In February 2026, after it was reported that ICE was planning to open an immigration detainment facility in Elkridge, Maryland, she testified in support of legislation introduced by Howard County executive Calvin Ball III to prohibit privately owned buildings from being used as detention centers. Later that month, after footage from inside the Baltimore ICE detention facility went viral on social media, Elfreth signed onto a letter to Noem and ICE director Todd Lyons expressing concerns with conditions at the facility.

=== National politics ===
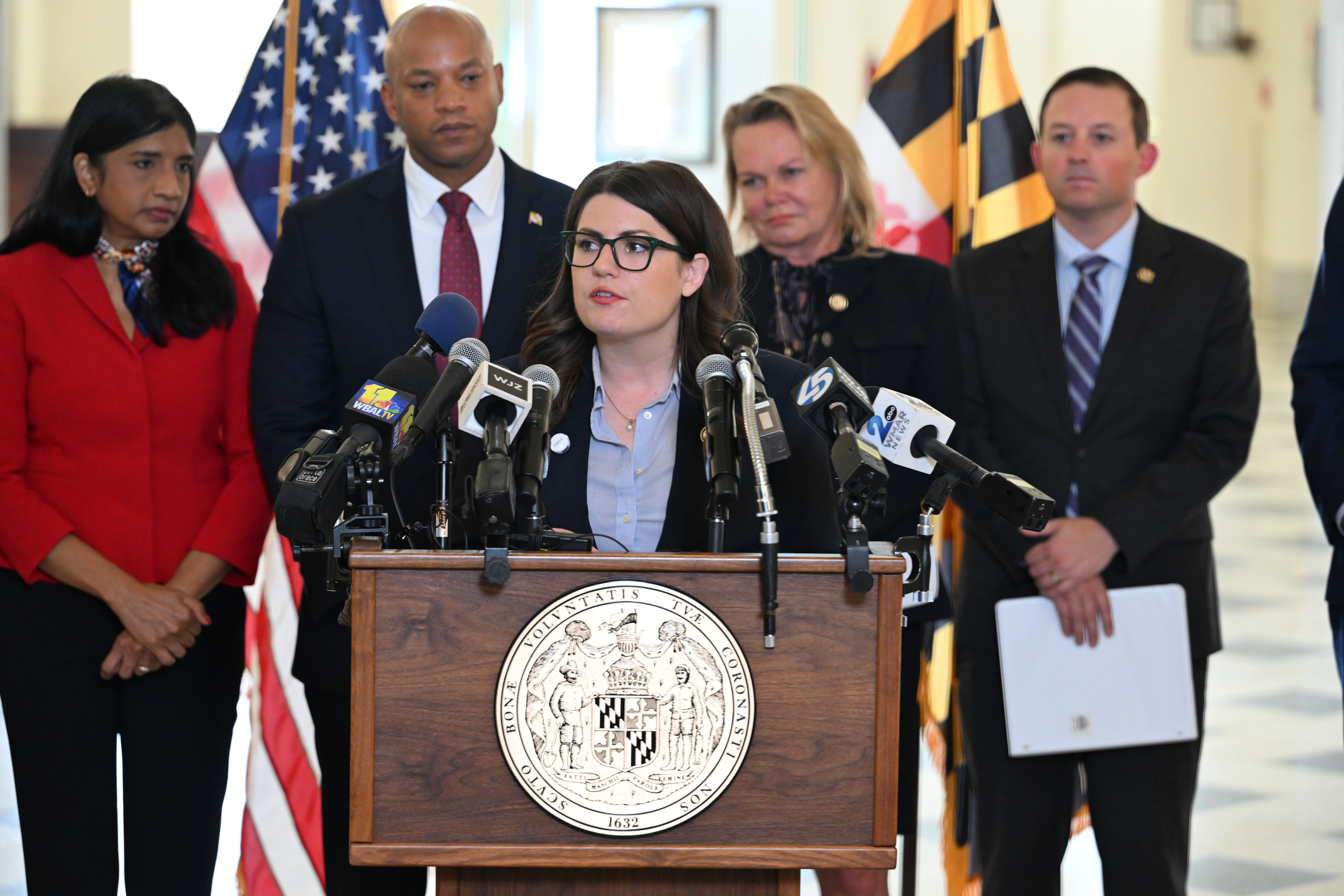
Elfreth speaks against the 2025 United States federal government shutdown.

Elfreth condemned the January 6 United States Capitol attack, saying that those who participated in the attack should be referred to as terrorists.

Elfreth opposed the Trump administration's efforts to fire and reclassify thousands of federal workers at various agencies, saying that there was "no check and balance" on the Department of Government Efficiency and criticized its director, Elon Musk, for having "billions of dollars in self interest with contracts with this federal government and foreign governments". In March 2025, she introduced the Protect Our Probationary Employees Act, which would allow probationary workers fired by the Trump administration to reclaim the seniority they amassed in their previous position if later rehired by the federal government. In September 2025, ahead of the 2025 United States federal government shutdown, Elfreth introduced a bill that would allow essential federal employees to apply for unemployment benefits during a government shutdown. She also criticized threats by the Trump administration to fire federal workers during the shutdown and opted to withhold her congressional pay during the shutdown. In November 2025, Elfreth criticized the bipartisan deal to end the government shutdown, saying that the agreement should've guaranteed a vote in the House on an extension of Affordable Care Act subsidies as well as the Senate.

In July 2025, after President Donald Trump said that he wanted the new Federal Bureau of Investigation headquarters to be the Ronald Reagan Building and International Trade Center in Washington, D.C., overturning a 2023 General Services Administration decision selecting Greenbelt, Maryland as the location for the FBI's new headquarters, Elfreth signed onto a letter saying that she and other Maryland lawmakers would "be fighting back against this proposal with every tool we have". In September 2025, Elfreth condemned the assassination of Charlie Kirk, saying that the U.S. was "at a boiling point" and likening it to the assassination of Melissa Hortman as well as the attempted assassinations of Josh Shapiro and Trump.

=== Paid family leave ===
During the 2020 legislative session, Elfreth introduced legislation to provide Maryland workers with up to 12 weeks of paid family leave, funded by a payroll tax shared equally by the worker and employer.

=== Social issues ===
Elfreth supports abortion rights, describing access to abortion services as a matter of economics. During the 2024 legislative session, she introduced a bill to provide abortion clinics in Maryland with $500,000 in grants toward physical security infrastructure. During the 2019 legislative session, Elfreth introduced a resolution to designate June 28 as "Freedom of the Press Day" in honor of the five killed at the Capital Gazette shooting. The bill passed unanimously and became law on April 18, 2019. In June 2019, Governor Hogan signed a proclamation declaring June 28 to be "Freedom of the Press Day" in Maryland.

During the 2021 legislative session, Elfreth introduced legislation to provide students access to menstrual products in school bathrooms. The bill passed and became law on May 30, 2021. During the 2022 legislative session, Elfreth introduced the "Great Maryland Outdoors Act", which would increase staffing, expand recreational amenities, and improve equity of access for Maryland state parks. The bill passed and became law on April 24, 2022. She also introduced the "David Perez Military Heroes Act", which provides state funding for psychedelic research to help military veterans with post-traumatic stress disorder, which passed and became law.

In October 2022, after The Baltimore Banner published a report accusing Gunpowder Falls State Park manager Michael Browning of presiding over a toxic work environment that senior park service officials had failed to address despite receiving multiple employee complaints since 2015, Elfreth and House majority leader Eric Luedtke wrote to Maryland Secretary of Natural Resources Jeannie Haddaway-Riccio calling for an independent review into the Maryland Department of Natural Resources' handling of employee reports. Haddaway-Riccio did not address legislators' call for an independent investigation in her response letter, instead saying that the department's human resources division was investigating the misconduct allegations "in consultation with the Maryland Department of Budget and Management and the Office of the Attorney General" and that she had taken "appropriate actions to address the situation", firing assistant Gunpowder park manager Dean Hughes, as well as state park superintendent Nita Settina.

Elfreth supports the TRUST in Congress Act, which would require members of Congress and their relatives to divest individual stocks or move their investments into a blind trust.

=== Transportation ===
In March 2023, Elfreth was one of five Democrats to vote for an amendment to decouple the state's gas tax from inflation. The amendment was rejected by the Maryland Senate in a 20–27 vote.

== Personal life ==
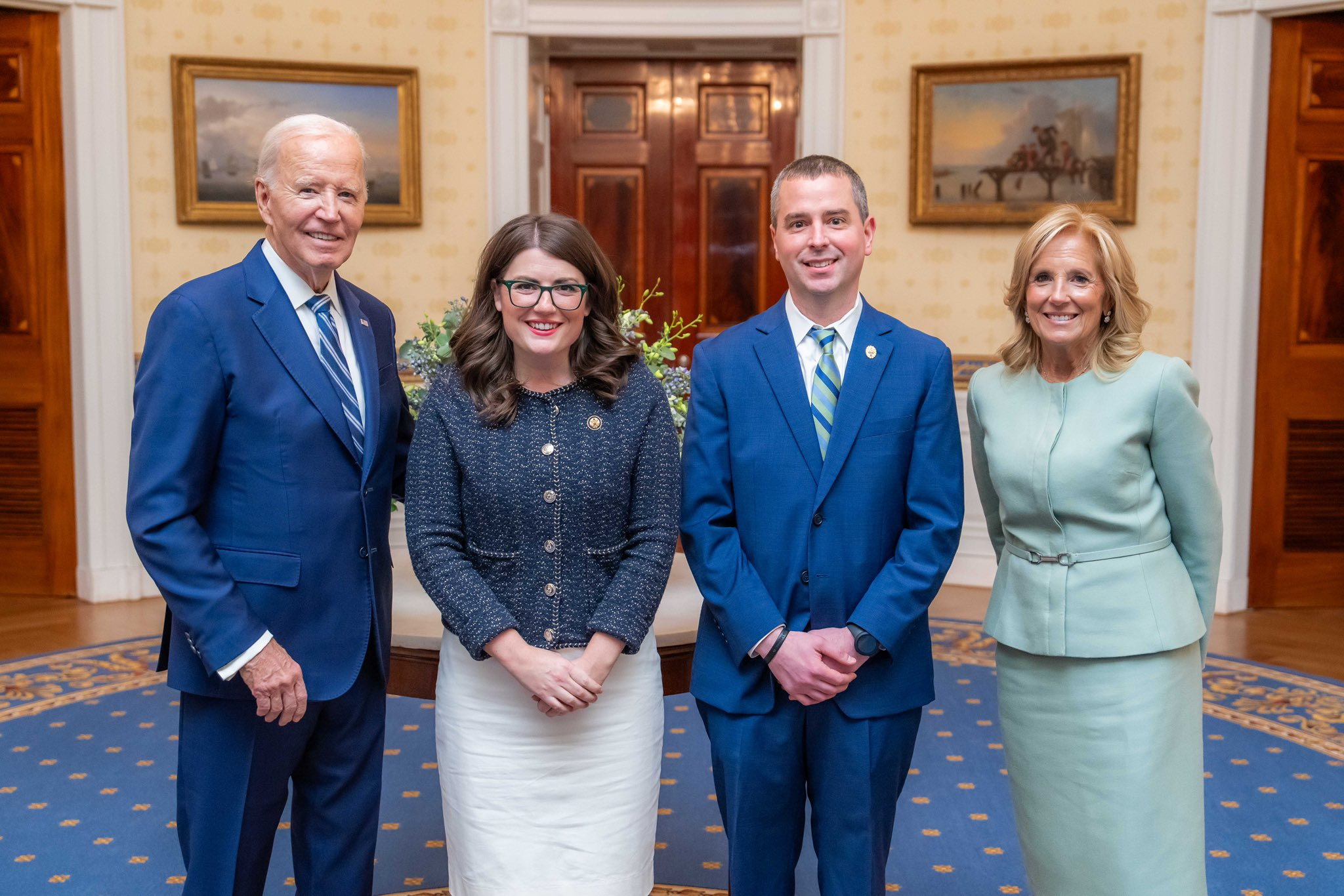
Elfreth and Eric Costello with President Joe Biden and First Lady Jill Biden, 2025

On September 18, 2026, Elfreth married Eric Costello, a former member of the Baltimore City Council who served from 2014 to 2024.

== Electoral history ==
Maryland Senate District 30 Democratic primary election, 2018
Party	Candidate	Votes	%
Democratic	Sarah K. Elfreth	6,482	58.77%
Democratic	Chrissy Holt	4,547	41.23%

Maryland Senate District 30 election, 2018
Party	Candidate	Votes	%	±%
Democratic	Sarah K. Elfreth	29,736	53.83%	+2.55%
Republican	Ron George	24,639	44.60%	−3.99%
Libertarian	Christopher Wallace, Sr.	826	1.50%	N/A
Write-in		38	0.12%	-0.05%

Maryland Senate District 30 election, 2022
Party	Candidate	Votes	%	±%
Democratic	Sarah K. Elfreth (incumbent)	30,359	57.39%	+3.56%
Republican	Stacie MacDonald	22,489	42.51%	−2.09%
Write-in		49	0.09%	+0.04%

Maryland's 3rd congressional district Democratic primary results, 2024
Party	Candidate	Votes	%
Democratic	Sarah Elfreth	29,459	36.18%
Democratic	Harry Dunn	20,380	25.03%
Democratic	Clarence Lam	9,548	11.73%
Democratic	Terri Hill	5,318	6.53%
Democratic	Mark Chang	4,106	5.04%
Democratic	Aisha Khan	2,199	2.70%
Democratic	Mike Rogers	2,147	2.64%
Democratic	John Morse	1,447	1.78%
Democratic	Abigail Diehl	1,379	1.69%
Democratic	Lindsay Donahue	1,213	1.49%
Democratic	Juan Dominguez	1,205	1.26%
Democratic	Michael Coburn (withdrawn)	583	0.72%
Democratic	Malcolm Thomas Colombo	527	0.65%
Democratic	Don Quinn	408	0.50%
Democratic	Kristin Lyman Nabors	397	0.49%
Democratic	Jeff Woodard	352	0.43%
Democratic	Gary Schuman	286	0.35%
Democratic	Mark Gosnell	221	0.27%
Democratic	Jake Pretot	162	0.20%
Democratic	Matt Libber	159	0.20%
Democratic	Stewart Silver	78	0.10%
Democratic	Danny Rupli	34	0.04%

Maryland's 3rd congressional district election, 2024
Party	Candidate	Votes	%	±%
Democratic	Sarah Elfreth	236,681	59.29%	−0.90%
Republican	Robert Steinberger	151,186	37.87%	−1.84%
Libertarian	Miguel Barajas	10,471	2.62%	N/A
Write-in		862	0.22%	+0.12%
Total votes		399,200	100.00%	

U.S. House of Representatives
Preceded by John Sarbanes	Member of the U.S. House of Representatives from Maryland's 3rd congressional district 2025–present	Incumbent
U.S. order of precedence (ceremonial)
Preceded by Troy Downing	United States representatives by seniority 376th	Succeeded by Gabe Evans
