= 2024 United States House of Representatives elections in Maryland =

- November 5, 2024

All 8 Maryland seats to the United States House of Representatives
	Majority party	Minority party
Party	Democratic	Republican
Last election	7	1
Seats won	7	1
Seat change	Steady	Steady
Popular vote	1,863,416	1,017,654
Percentage	63.48%	34.67%
Swing	▼1.23%	▲0.07%

Democratic
50–60%
60–70%
70–80%
80–90%
Republican
50–60%
60–70%
70–80%

The 2024 United States House of Representatives elections in Maryland were held on November 5, 2024, to elect the eight U.S. representatives from the state of Maryland, one from each of the state's eight congressional districts. The elections coincided with the 2024 U.S. presidential election, as well as other elections to the House of Representatives, elections to the United States Senate, and various state and local elections. The Democratic and Republican primary elections were held on May 14, 2024.

Two incumbent U.S. representatives—Dutch Ruppersberger and John Sarbanes—opted to retire instead of seek re-election, while David Trone ran unsuccessfully in the 2024 United States Senate election in Maryland, losing to eventual winner Prince George's County Executive Angela Alsobrooks in the Democratic primary. The three retiring congressmen were succeeded by Johnny Olszewski, who was elected to the 2nd district; Sarah Elfreth, who was elected to the 3rd district; and April McClain Delaney, who was elected to the 6th district. The election of Elfreth and McClain Delaney marks the first time Maryland has a female U.S. representative since 2017, and the first time multiple women have served in the state's delegation simultaneously since 1995.

== Overview ==
Party	Candi- dates	Votes		Seats	
Party	Candi- dates	No.	%	No.	+/–
Democratic Party	8	1,863,416	63.48%	7	Steady
Republican Party	8	1,017,654	34.67%	1	Steady
Libertarian Party	5	38,144	1.27%	0	Steady
Green Party	1	9,612	0.32%	0	Steady
Write-ins	-	6,502	0.23%	0	Steady
Total	21	2,953,328	100.00%	8	Steady

== District 1 ==
2024 Maryland's 1st congressional district election
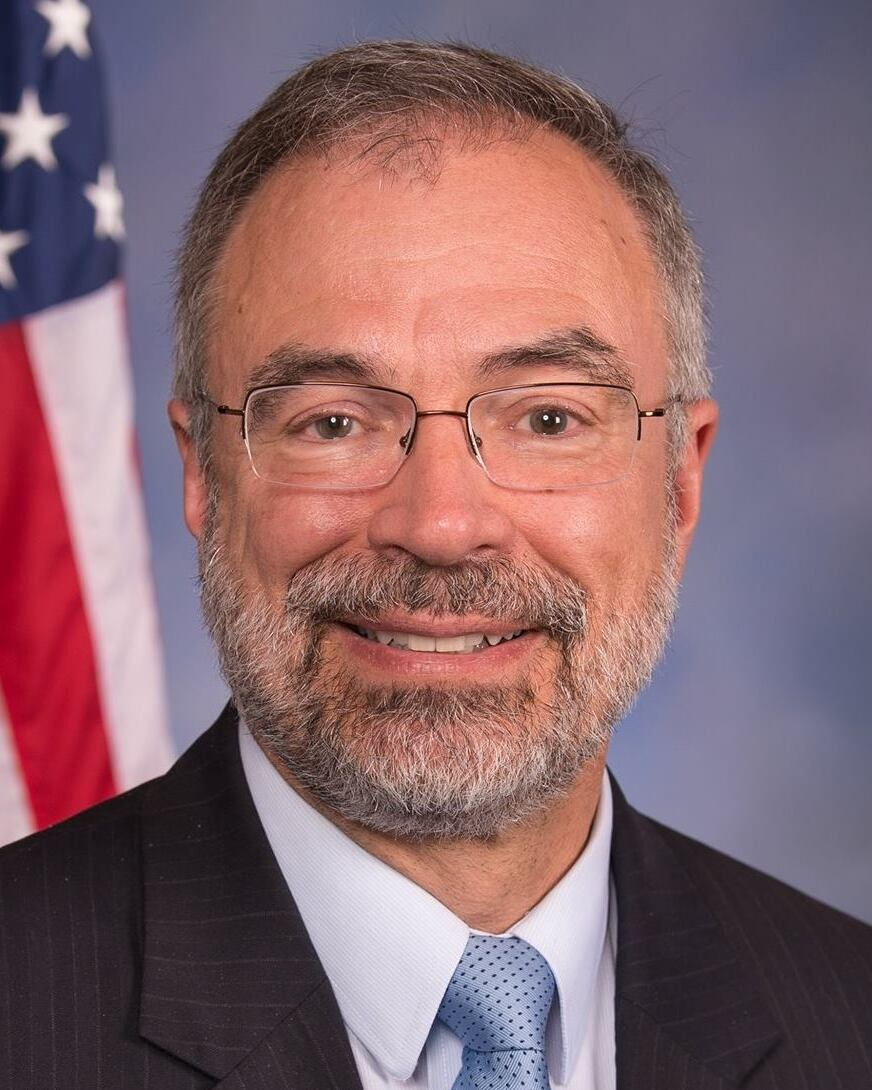

Nominee	Andy Harris	Blane Miller
Party	Republican	Democratic
Popular vote	246,356	154,985
Percentage	59.4%	37.4%
- Harris: 40–50% 50–60% 60–70% 70–80% 80–90% >90% Miller: 40–50% 50–60% 60–70% 70–80% 80–90% No votes
U.S. Representative before election
Andy Harris
Republican
Elected U.S. Representative
Andy Harris
Republican

The 1st district encompasses the entire Eastern Shore of Maryland, including Salisbury, Harford County, and parts of north Baltimore County. The incumbent is Republican Andy Harris, who was re-elected with 54.5% of the vote in 2022.

=== Republican primary ===
==== Nominee ====
- Andy Harris, incumbent U.S. representative

==== Eliminated in primary ====
- Chris Bruneau, building contractor
- Michael Scott Lemon, candidate for Maryland's 5th congressional district in 2022

==== Endorsements ====
Endorsements in bold were made after the primary elections.

Chris Bruneau

Statewide elected officials

- Boyd Rutherford, Lieutenant Governor of Maryland (2015–2023)
Andy Harris

Organizations

- AIPAC
- Turning Point Action

==== Debates and forums ====
2024 Maryland's 1st congressional district Republican primary debates
No.	Date	Host	Moderator	Link	Participants		
P Participant A Absent N Non-invitee I Invitee W Withdrawn							
P Participant A Absent N Non-invitee I Invitee W Withdrawn					Bruneau	Harris	Lemon
1	Apr 21, 2024	Eastern Shore; League of Women Voters	Glenna Heckathorn	YouTube	**P**	**A**	**P**

==== Fundraising ====
Campaign finance reports as of June 30, 2024
Candidate	Raised	Spent	Cash on hand
Chris Bruneau (R)	$72,979 (Note: $60,657 of this total was self-funded by Bruneau)	$49,151	$22,419
Andy Harris (R)	$1,012,519	$846,837	$998,023
Source: Federal Election Commission

==== Results ====
Results by county Harris: 60–70%; 70–80%; 80–90%

Republican primary results
Party	Candidate	Votes	%
**Republican**	**Andy Harris (incumbent)**	**57,010**	**77.4**
Republican	Chris Bruneau	11,946	16.2
Republican	Michael Scott Lemon	4,714	6.4
Total votes		**73,670**	**100.0**

=== Democratic primary ===
==== Nominee ====
- Blane H. Miller III, business owner and nominee for Harford County Executive in 2022

==== Eliminated in primary ====
- Blessing Oluwadare, customer service agent

==== Endorsements ====
Endorsements in bold were made after the primary elections.

Blane Miller

Labor unions

- **Maryland State & D.C. AFL-CIO**
- United Auto Workers

==== Debates and forums ====
2024 Maryland's 1st congressional district Democratic primary debates
No.	Date	Host	Moderator	Link	Participants	
P Participant A Absent N Non-invitee I Invitee W Withdrawn						
P Participant A Absent N Non-invitee I Invitee W Withdrawn					Miller	Oluwadare
1	Apr 21, 2024	Eastern Shore; League of Women Voters	Glenna Heckathorn	N/A	**P**	**A**

==== Results ====
Results by county Miller: 50–60%; 60–70%

Democratic primary results
Party	Candidate	Votes	%
**Democratic**	**Blane H. Miller III**	**26,845**	**60.8**
Democratic	Blessing Oluwadare	17,289	39.2
Total votes		**44,134**	**100.0**

=== Third-party and independent candidates ===
==== Declared ====
- Joshua O'Brien (Libertarian), firefighter

=== General election ===
==== Predictions ====
Source	Ranking	As of
The Cook Political Report	Solid R	September 27, 2023
Inside Elections	Solid R	September 15, 2023
Sabato's Crystal Ball	Safe R	October 4, 2023
Elections Daily	Safe R	October 5, 2023
CNalysis	Solid R	November 16, 2023

==== Fundraising ====
Campaign finance reports as of November 25, 2024
Candidate	Raised	Spent	Cash on hand
Andy Harris (R)	$1,341,923	$1,394,852	$760,227
Source: Federal Election Commission

==== Results ====
2024 Maryland's 1st congressional district election
Party	Candidate	Votes	%	±%
**Republican**	**Andy Harris (incumbent)**	**246,356**	**59.41%**	**+4.98%**
Democratic	Blane Miller, III	154,985	37.37%	−5.76%
Libertarian	Joshua O'Brien	12,664	3.05%	+0.69%
Write-in		675	0.16%	+0.07
Total votes		**414,680**	**100.00%**	
Republican **hold**				

== District 2 ==
2024 Maryland's 2nd congressional district election
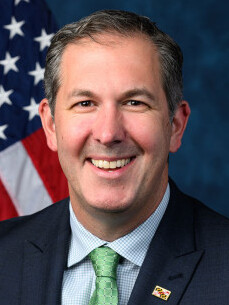

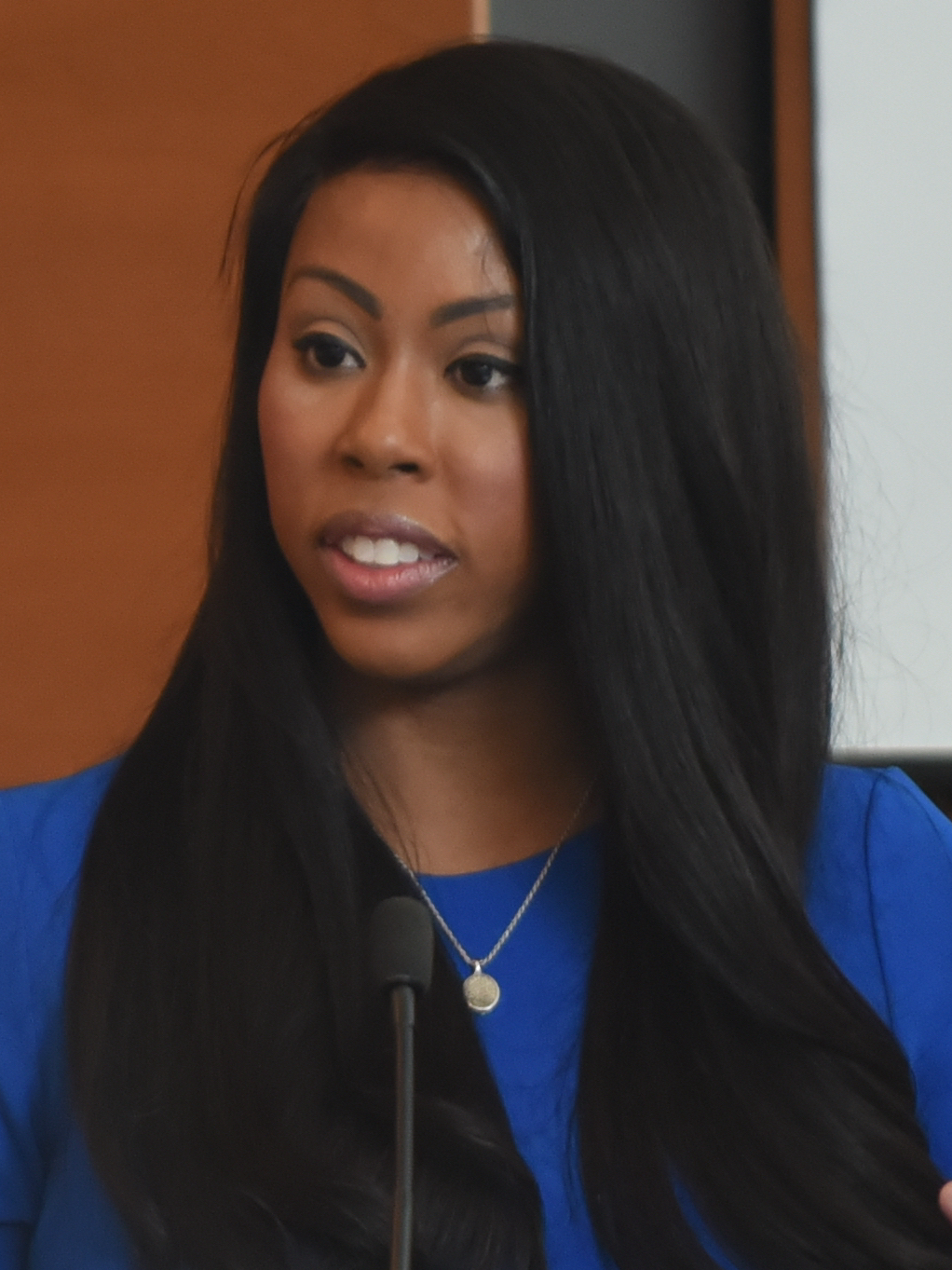
Nominee	Johnny Olszewski	Kimberly Klacik
Party	Democratic	Republican
Popular vote	223,797	152,079
Percentage	58.2%	39.5%
- Olszewski: 40–50% 50–60% 60–70% 70–80% 80–90% >90% Klacik: 40–50% 50–60% 60–70% 70–80% 80–90%
U.S. Representative before election
Dutch Ruppersberger
Democratic
Elected U.S. Representative
Johnny Olszewski
Democratic

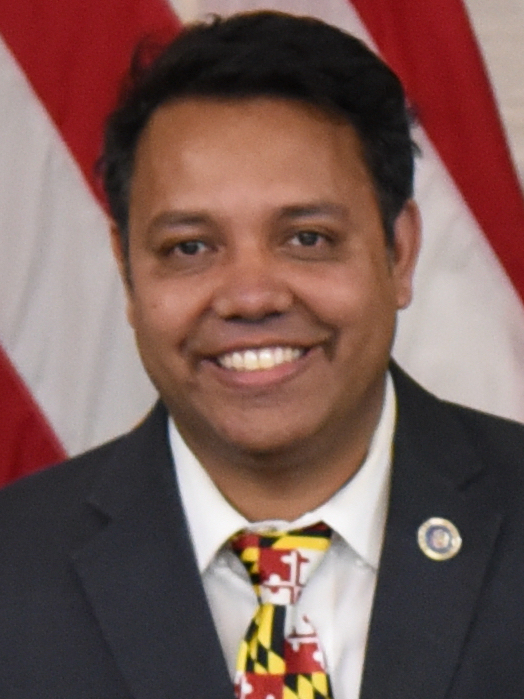
Harry Bhandari

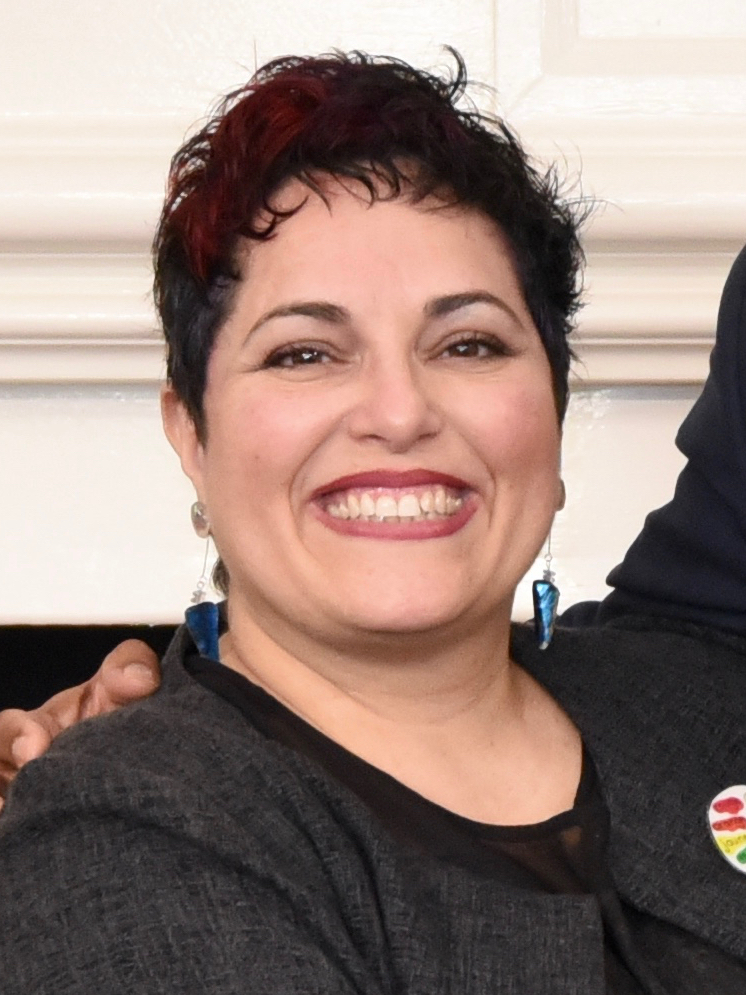
Sia Kyriakakos

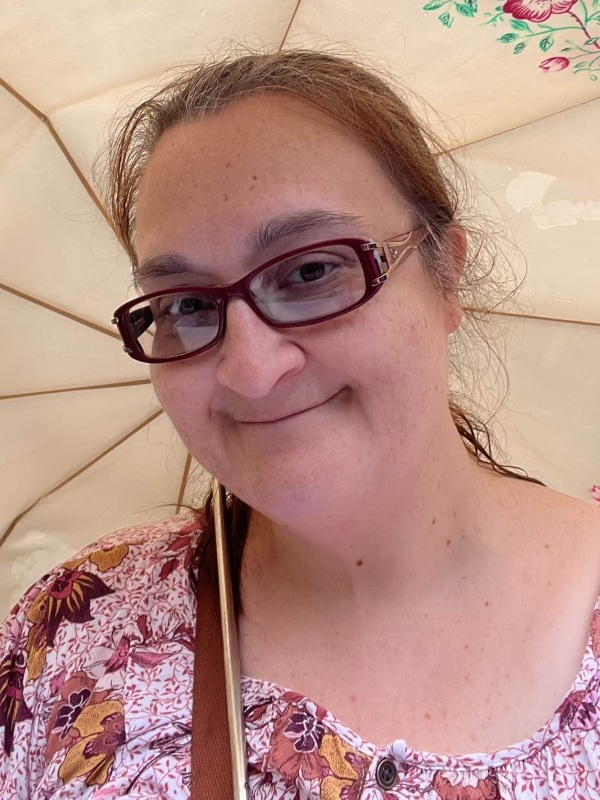
Jessica Sjoberg

The 2nd district encompasses much of Baltimore and Carroll counties, along with a portion of Baltimore itself. The incumbent is Democrat Dutch Ruppersberger, who was re-elected with 59.3% of the vote in 2022. On January 26, 2024, Ruppersberger announced that he would not run for re-election in 2024.

=== Democratic primary ===
==== Nominee ====
- Johnny Olszewski, Baltimore County Executive (2018–present) and former state delegate from the 6th district (2006–2015)

==== Eliminated in primary ====
- Harry Bhandari, state delegate from the 8th district (2019–present)
- Sia Kyriakakos, teacher
- Sharron Reed-Burns, human services specialist
- Jessica Sjoberg, medical assistant
- Clint Spellman Jr., insurance agent

==== Declined ====
- Dutch Ruppersberger, incumbent U.S. representative (endorsed Olszewski)

==== Endorsements ====
Endorsements in bold were made after the primary elections.

Johnny Olszewski

U.S. senators

- Barbara Mikulski, Maryland (1987–2017)
- Chris Van Hollen, Maryland (2017–present)

U.S. representatives

- Steny Hoyer, MD-05 (1981–present)
- Dutch Ruppersberger, MD-02 (2003–present)

Statewide elected officials

- Brooke Lierman, Maryland Comptroller (2023–present)

State legislators

- 6 state senators, including senate president Bill Ferguson
- 9 state delegates, including speaker Adrienne Jones

County officials

- Angela Alsobrooks, Prince George's County Executive (2018–present)
- Calvin Ball III, Howard County Executive (2018–present)
- Steuart Pittman, Anne Arundel County Executive (2018–present)
- Pat Young, Baltimore County councilmember (2022–present)

Local officials

- Ivan Bates, Baltimore State's Attorney (2023–present)
- Nick Mosby, president of the Baltimore City Council (2020–present)
- Brandon Scott, mayor of Baltimore (2020–present)

Individuals

- Jason Palmer, venture capitalist

Organizations

- AIPAC
- CASA in Action
- **Democratic Majority for Israel**
- **Everytown for Gun Safety**
- **Giffords**
- J Street PAC
- **Jewish Democratic Council of America**
- League of Conservation Voters
- National Organization for Women PAC
- **NewDem Action Fund**
- **Planned Parenthood Action Fund**

Labor unions

- American Federation of State, County and Municipal Employees Council 3
- International Association of Machinists and Aerospace Workers Maryland chapter
- International Brotherhood of Electrical Workers Local 24
- Laborers' International Union of North America Philadelphia/Baltimore/Washington District Council
- **Maryland State & D.C. AFL-CIO**
- National Education Association
- Service Employees International Union Local 500
- **SMART Union**
- United Auto Workers

Newspapers

- Baltimore Afro-American

==== Fundraising ====
Campaign finance reports as of June 30, 2024
Candidate	Raised	Spent	Cash on hand
Harry Bhandari (D)	$268,236	$260,766	$7,470
Sia Kyriakakos (D)	$23,028	$23,368	$0
Johnny Olszewski (D)	$1,117,104	$885,909	$231,195
Source: Federal Election Commission

==== Debates and forums ====
2024 Maryland's 2nd congressional district Democratic primary debates
No.	Date	Host	Moderator	Link	Participants				
P Participant A Absent N Non-invitee I Invitee W Withdrawn									
P Participant A Absent N Non-invitee I Invitee W Withdrawn					Bhandari	Kyriakakos	Olszewski	Sjoberg	Spellman
1	Mar 4, 2024	Baltimore County Progressive; Democrats Club	?	N/A	**P**	**P**	**P**	**P**	**P**

==== Polling ====
Poll source	Date(s) administered	Sample size (Note: Key: A – all adults RV – registered voters LV – likely voters V – unclear)	Margin of error	Harry Bhandari	Johnny Olszewski	Other	Undecided
Global Strategy Group (Note: Poll sponsored by Olszewski's campaign)	February 14–19, 2024	400 (LV)	–	5%	**50%**	–	38%

==== Results ====
Results by county Olszewski: 70–80%

Democratic primary results
Party	Candidate	Votes	%
**Democratic**	**Johnny Olszewski**	**65,995**	**78.7**
Democratic	Harry Bhandari	7,150	8.5
Democratic	Sia Kyriakakos	4,080	4.9
Democratic	Sharron Reed-Burns	3,472	4.1
Democratic	Jessica Sjoberg	1,692	2.0
Democratic	Clint Spellman Jr.	1,466	1.8
Total votes		**83,855**	**100.0**

=== Republican primary ===
==== Nominee ====
- Kim Klacik, WCBM radio host and nominee for the 7th district in 2020

==== Eliminated in primary ====
- John Thormann, contractual consultant and candidate for U.S. Senate in 2022
- Dave Wallace, business owner and perennial candidate

==== Declined ====
- Chris West, state senator from the 42nd district (2019–present)

==== Endorsements ====
Endorsements in bold were made after the primary elections.

Kim Klacik

State legislators

- Brian Chisholm, state delegate from the 31st district (2019–present)
- Matt Morgan, state delegate from district 29A (2015–present)
- Ryan Nawrocki, state delegate from district 7A (2023–present)
- Kathy Szeliga, state delegate from district 7A (2011–present)

==== Fundraising ====
Campaign finance reports as of June 30, 2024
Candidate	Raised	Spent	Cash on hand
Kimberly Klacik (R)	$86,032 (Note: $800 of this total was self-funded by Klacik)	$243,605	$14,757
John Thormann (R)	$3,046	$4,522	$1,857
Dave Wallace (R)	$14,345 (Note: $2,700 of this total was self-funded by Wallace)	$13,096	$1,346
Source: Federal Election Commission

==== Results ====
Results by county Klacik: 50–60%; 60–70%

Republican primary results
Party	Candidate	Votes	%
**Republican**	**Kimberly Klacik**	**25,377**	**63.1**
Republican	Dave Wallace	9,433	23.5
Republican	John Thormann	5,414	13.5
Total votes		**40,224**	**100.0**

=== Third-party and independent candidates ===
==== Declared ====
- Jasen Wunder (Libertarian), paramedic and nominee for the 8th district in 2016 and 2018

=== General election ===
==== Predictions ====
Source	Ranking	As of
The Cook Political Report	Solid D	September 27, 2023
Inside Elections	Solid D	September 15, 2023
Sabato's Crystal Ball	Safe D	October 4, 2023
Elections Daily	Safe D	October 5, 2023
CNalysis	Solid D	November 16, 2023

==== Fundraising ====
Campaign finance reports as of November 25, 2024
Candidate	Raised	Spent	Cash on hand
Johnny Olszewski (D)	$1,561,719	$1,378,359	$183,361
Kimberly Klacik (R)	$169,134 (Note: $800 of this total was self-funded by Klacik)	$321,185	$20,279
Source: Federal Election Commission

==== Results ====
2024 Maryland's 2nd congressional district election
Party	Candidate	Votes	%	±%
**Democratic**	**Johnny Olszewski**	**223,797**	**58.16%**	**−1.07%**
Republican	Kimberly Klacik	152,079	39.52%	−1.11%
Libertarian	Jasen Wunder	8,169	2.12%	N/A
Write-in		749	0.19%	+0.06%
Total votes		**384,794**	**100.00%**	
Democratic **hold**				

== District 3 ==
2024 Maryland's 3rd congressional district election
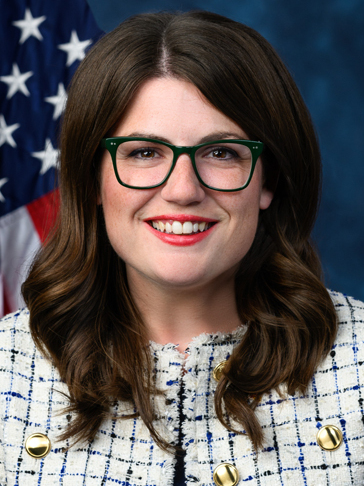

Nominee	Sarah Elfreth	Robert Steinberger
Party	Democratic	Republican
Popular vote	236,681	151,186
Percentage	59.3%	37.9%
- Elfreth: 40–50% 50–60% 60–70% 70–80% 80–90% Steinberger: 40–50% 50–60% 60–70% 70–80%
U.S. Representative before election
John Sarbanes
Democratic
Elected U.S. Representative
Sarah Elfreth
Democratic

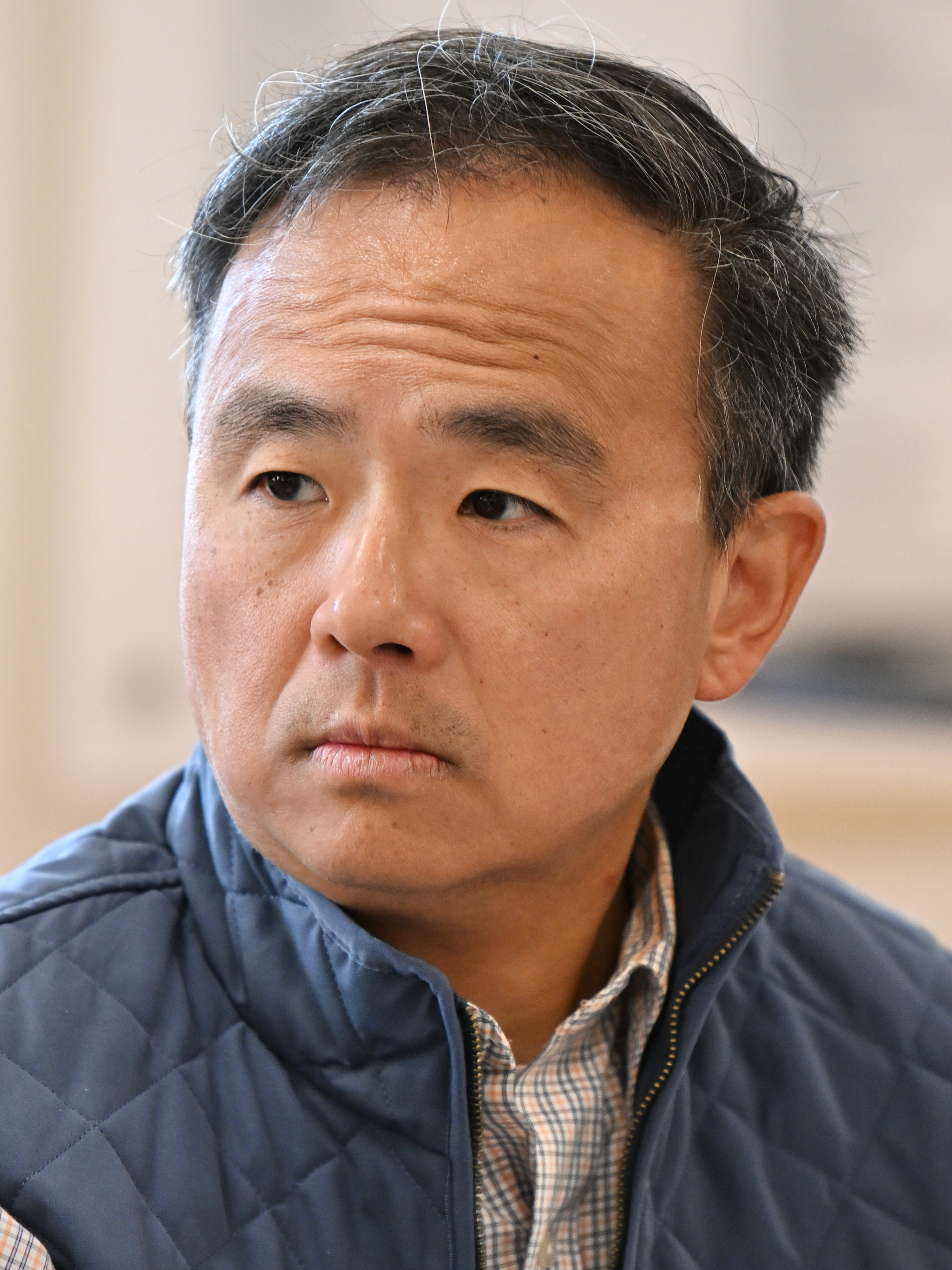
Mark Chang

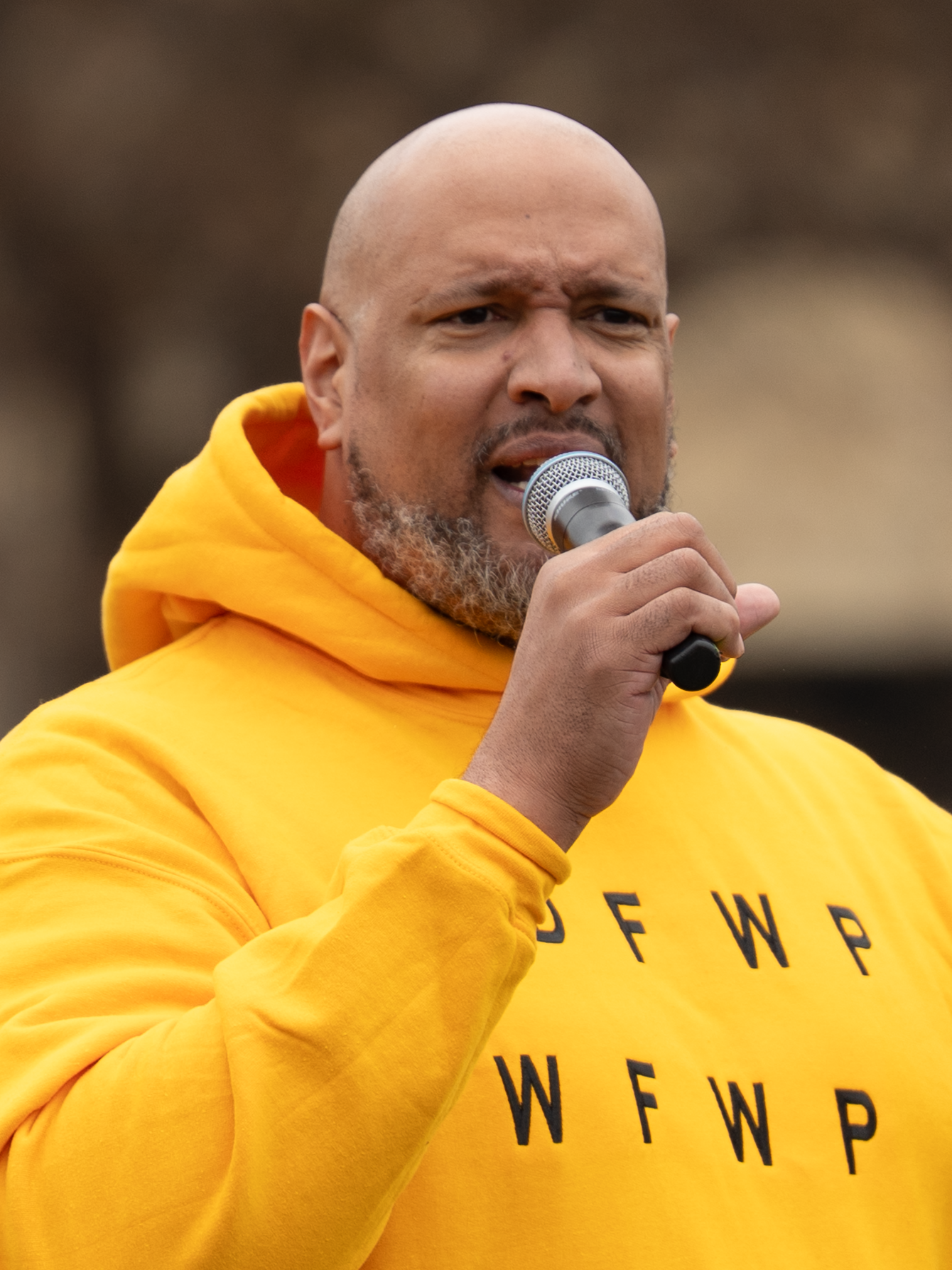
Harry Dunn

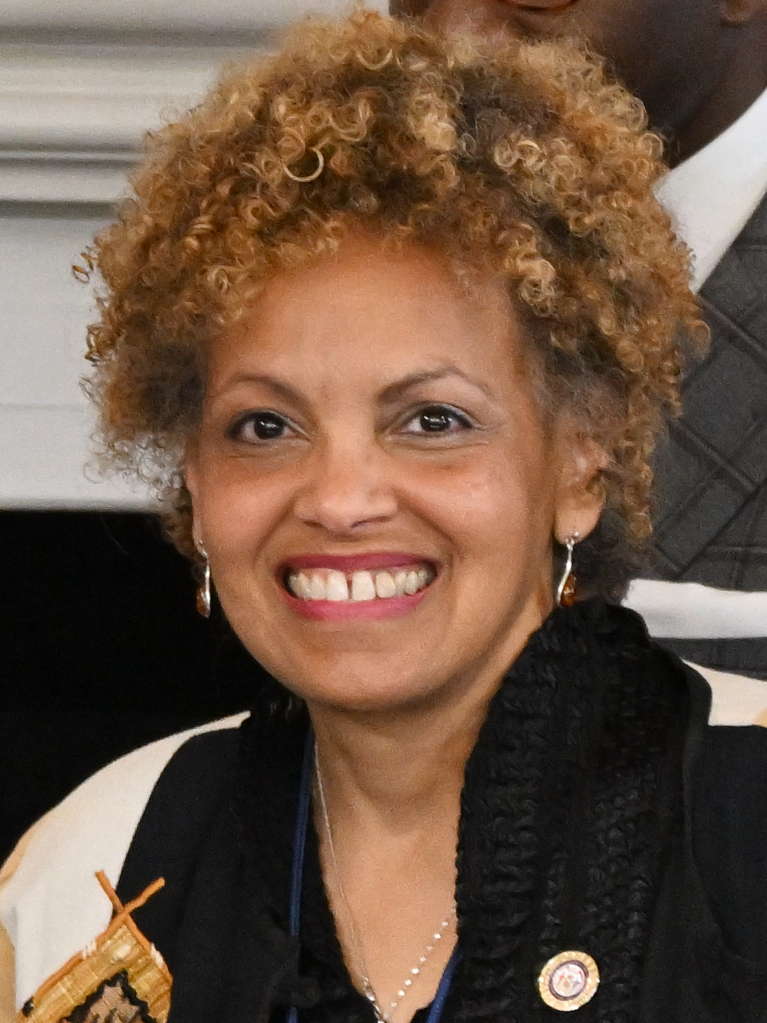
Terri Hill

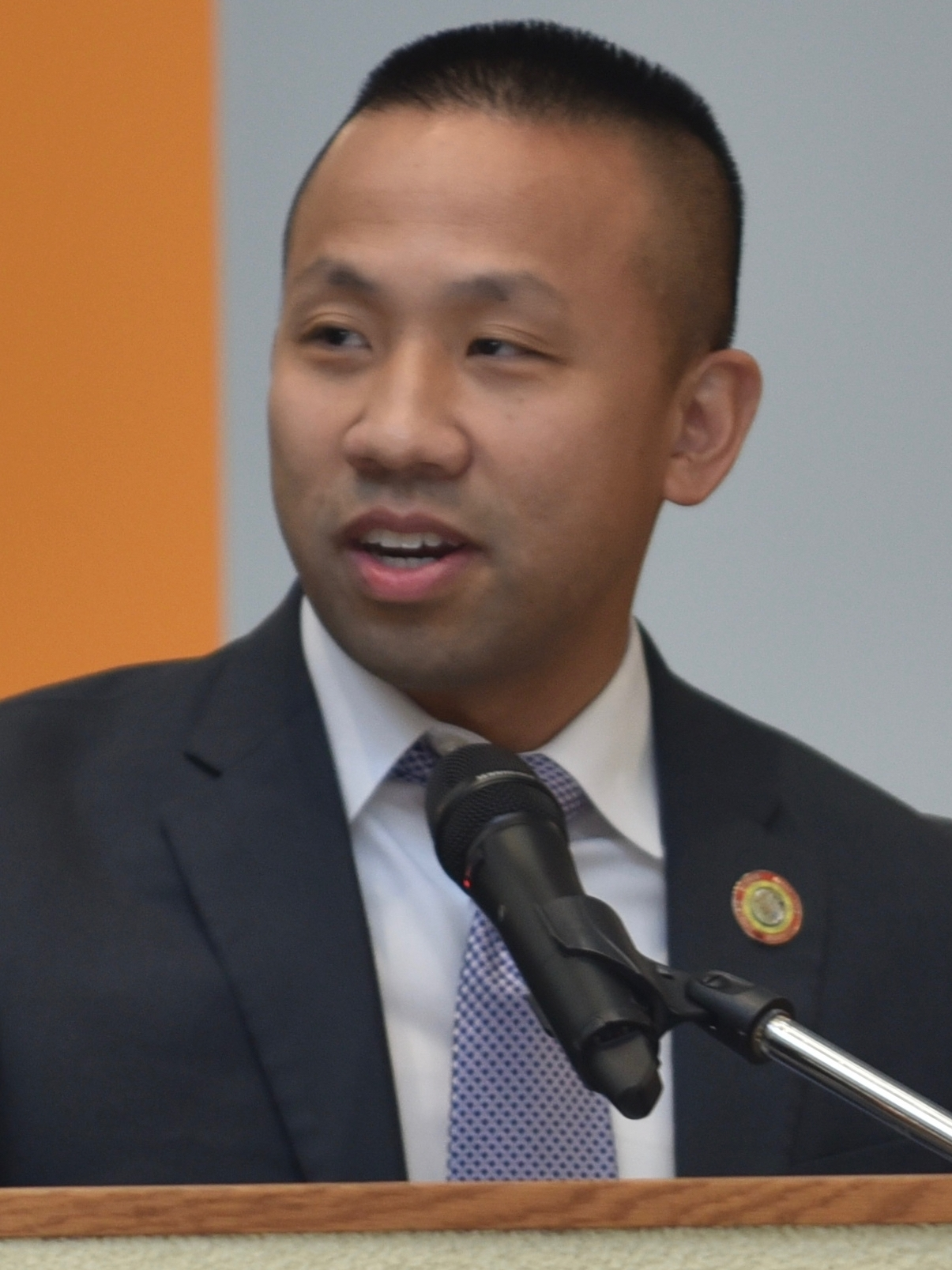
Clarence Lam

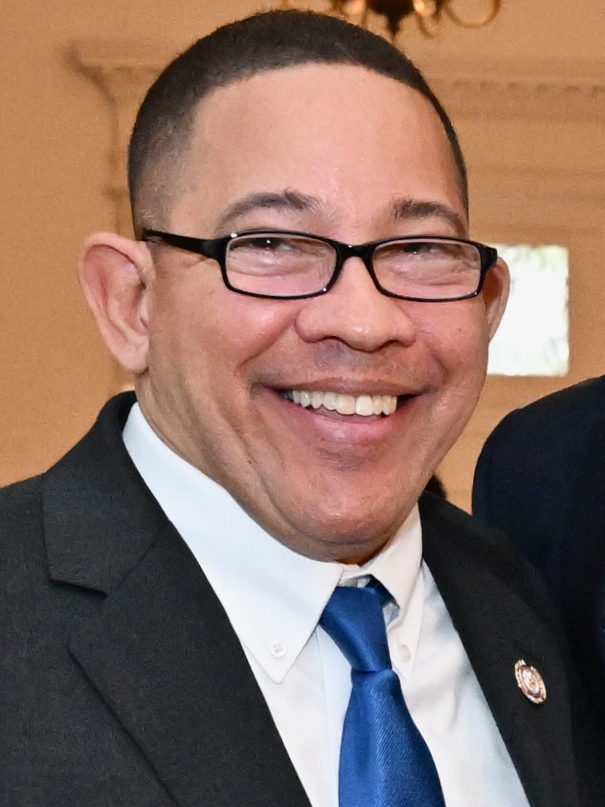
Mike Rogers

The 3rd district encompasses all of Howard County, much of Anne Arundel County, including Annapolis, and parts of Carroll County. The incumbent is Democrat John Sarbanes, who was re-elected with 60.2% of the vote in 2022. On October 26, 2023, Sarbanes announced that he would not seek re-election to a tenth term in 2024.

=== Democratic primary ===
==== Nominee ====
- Sarah Elfreth, state senator from the 30th district (2019–present)

==== Eliminated in primary ====
- Mark Chang, state delegate from the 32nd district (2019–present)
- Malcolm Thomas Colombo, structural engineer and candidate for the 1st district in 2022
- Abigail Diehl, produce business owner
- Juan Dominguez, former vice president of Breezeline and former Republican Bogota, New Jersey borough councilor (1995–1998) (previously ran for U.S. Senate)
- Lindsay Donahue, medical IT specialist
- Harry Dunn, U.S. Capitol Police officer known for defending the U.S. Capitol during the January 6 Capitol attack
- Mark Gosnell, pulmonologist
- Terri Hill, state delegate from district 12A (2015–present) and candidate for the 7th district in 2020
- Aisha Khan, childcare business owner and candidate for HD-44B in 2022
- Clarence Lam, state senator from the 12th district (2019–present)
- Matt Libber, sports business executive
- Kristin Lyman Nabors, nurse
- John Morse, former Association of Flight Attendants general counsel
- Jake Pretot, software developer and perennial candidate
- Don Quinn, civil rights attorney and Republican nominee for SD-30 in 2014
- Mike Rogers, state delegate from the 32nd district (2019–present)
- Danny Rupli, attorney and candidate for the 6th district in 1976 and 1978
- Gary Schuman, journalist and candidate for the 7th district in 2020
- Stewart Silvers, psychiatrist
- Jeff Woodard, nonprofit executive and candidate for the 7th district in 2020

==== Withdrawn ====
- Vanessa Atterbeary, state delegate from the 13th district (2015–present)
- Michael Coburn, criminal defense attorney

==== Declined ====
- Calvin Ball III, Howard County Executive (2018–present)
- Dawn Gile, state senator from the 33rd district (2023–present) (endorsed Elfreth)
- Dana Jones, state delegate from district 30A (2020–present) (endorsed Elfreth)
- Steuart Pittman, Anne Arundel County Executive (2018–present) (endorsed Elfreth)
- John Sarbanes, incumbent U.S. representative
- Pete Smith, chair of the Anne Arundel County Council (2022–present) from the first district (2012–2013, 2014–2018, 2022–present) (endorsed Rogers)

==== Endorsements ====
Endorsements in bold were made after the primary elections.

Mark Chang

State legislators

- J. Sandy Bartlett, state delegate from the 32nd district (2019–present)
Abigail Diehl

State legislators

- John Astle, state senator from the 30th district (1995–2019)
- Tom Davis, South Carolina state senator from the 46th district (2009–present) (Republican)
Juan Dominguez

Organizations

- Latino Victory Fund
- Vote Common Good (co-endorsed with Rogers)
Harry Dunn

U.S. representatives

- Joyce Beatty, OH-03 (2013–present)
- Troy Carter, LA-02 (2021–present)
- Emanuel Cleaver, MO-05 (2005–present)
- Jim Clyburn, SC-06 (1993–present)
- Jasmine Crockett, TX-30 (2023–present)
- Pramila Jayapal, WA-07 (2017–present)
- Nancy Pelosi, Speaker Emerita (2007–2011, 2019–2023) from CA-11 (1987–present)
- Mark Pocan, WI-02 (2013–present)
- Ayanna Pressley, MA-07 (2019–present)
- Jamie Raskin, MD-08 (2017–present)
- Adam Schiff, CA-30 (2001–present)
- Eric Swalwell, CA-14 (2013–present)
- Bennie Thompson, MS-02 (1993–present)
- Marc Veasey, TX-33 (2013–present)

County officials

- Will Jawando, at-large Montgomery County councilor (2018–present)

Party officials

- Susan Turnbull, former chair of the Maryland Democratic Party (2009–2011)

Organizations

- 314 Action
- Congressional Progressive Caucus
- End Citizens United
- J Street PAC
- VoteVets.org
Sarah Elfreth

U.S. senators

- Ben Cardin, Maryland (2007–present)
- Barbara Mikulski, Maryland (1987–2017)

U.S. representatives

- Lois Frankel, FL-22 (2013–present)
- Tom McMillen, MD-04 (1987–1993)

Statewide elected officials

- Parris Glendening, Maryland Governor (1995–2003)
- **Wes Moore**, Maryland Governor (2023–present)

State legislators

- Heather Bagnall, state delegate from district 33C (2019–present)
- Pamela Beidle, state senator from the 32nd district (2019–present)
- Dawn Gile, state senator from the 33rd district (2023–present)
- Dana Jones, state delegate from district 30A (2020–present)
- Andrew Pruski, state delegate from district 33A (2023–present)

County officials

- Janet Owens, former Anne Arundel County Executive (1998–2006)
- Steuart Pittman, Anne Arundel County Executive (2018–present)

Individuals

- **Harry Dunn**, former U.S. Capitol Police officer

Organizations

- **AIPAC**
- **Democratic Majority for Israel**
- **EMILY's List**
- **Everytown for Gun Safety**
- **Giffords**
- League of Conservation Voters Action Fund
- **NewDem Action Fund**
- Pro-Israel America
- **Reproductive Freedom for All**
- Sierra Club

Labor unions

- **American Federation of State, County and Municipal Employees Council 3**
- **Brotherhood of Locomotive Engineers and Trainmen**
- International Brotherhood of Teamsters
- Laborers' International Union of North America Philadelphia/Baltimore/Washington District Council
- **Maryland State & D.C. AFL-CIO**
- National Education Association
- Professional Fire Fighters of Maryland
- Service Employees International Union Local 500
- **SMART Union**
Terri Hill

State legislators

- Jen Terrasa, state delegate from the 13th district (2019–present)
Clarence Lam

State legislators

- Elizabeth Bobo, former state delegate from district 12B (1995–2015) and former Howard County Executive (1986–1990)
- Ned Carey, former state delegate from district 31A (2015–2023)
- Lily Qi, state delegate from the 15th district (2019–present)
- Gary Simmons, state delegate from district 12B (2023–present)
- Frank S. Turner, former state delegate from the 13th district (1995–2019)

Organizations

- AAPI Victory Fund
- Asian American Action Fund
- ASPIRE PAC
- CASA in Action
- Center for Biological Diversity Action Fund
- Friends of the Earth Action
- Food & Water Action

Labor unions

- International Association of Machinists and Aerospace Workers Maryland chapter
- National Nurses United (co-endorsed with Morse)
John Morse

U.S. senators

- Bernie Sanders, Vermont (2007–present)

Individuals

- Shawn Fain, president of United Auto Workers (2023–present)
- Sara Nelson, president of the Association of Flight Attendants (2014–present)

Labor unions

- Association of Flight Attendants
- Association of Professional Flight Attendants
- Communications Workers of America
- International Federation of Professional and Technical Engineers
- National Nurses United (co-endorsed with Lam)
- United Auto Workers
- United Mine Workers of America
Mike Rogers

U.S. representatives

- Max Rose, NY-11 (2019–2021)

State legislators

- Shaneka Henson, state delegate from district 30A (2019–present)
- N. Scott Phillips, state delegate from the 10th district (2023–present)

County officials

- Everett Sesker, Anne Arundel County Sheriff (2022–present)
- Pete Smith, chair of the Anne Arundel County Council (2022–present) from the first district (2012–2013, 2014–2018, 2022–present)

Organizations

- Vote Common Good (co-endorsed with Dominguez)
- With Honor Fund

Newspapers

- Baltimore Afro-American
Declined to endorse

U.S. representatives

- John Sarbanes, incumbent U.S. representative

Party officials

- Kenneth Ulman, chair of the Maryland Democratic Party (2023–present) and former Howard County Executive (2006–2014)

==== Debates and forums ====
A straw poll was held during the District 30 Democratic Club forum using ranked choice voting, which was won by Elfreth, who received 40 of the 64 votes cast by members of the club.

2024 Maryland's 3rd congressional district Democratic primary debates
No.	Date	Host	Moderator	Link	Participants									
P Participant A Absent N Non-invitee I Invitee W Withdrawn														
P Participant A Absent N Non-invitee I Invitee W Withdrawn					Chang	Donahue	Dunn	Elfreth	Hill	Lam	Morse	Quinn	Rogers	Other
1	Feb 24, 2024	Columbia Democratic Club	Jackie Scott; Gabriel Moreno	YouTube	**A**	**P**	**A**	**P**	**P**	**P**	**A**	**P**	**A**	–
2	Apr 17, 2024	District 30 Democratic Club	Dan Nataf; Keanuu Smith-Brown	Facebook	**P**	**P**	**P**	**P**	**P**	**P**	**P**	**P**	**P**	**P** (Note: Malcolm Colombo, Abigail Diehl, Juan Dominguez, Mark Gosnell, Matthew Libber, Kristin Lyman Nabors, and Gary Schuman)
3	Apr 30, 2024	Caucus of African; American Leaders	Robert Johnson	Facebook	**A**	**A**	**P**	**P**	**P**	**P**	**P**	**P**	**P**	**P** (Note: Malcolm Colombo, Abigail Diehl, and Kristin Lyman Nabors)

==== Polling ====
Poll source	Date(s) administered	Sample size	Margin of error	Mark Chang	Michael Coburn	Juan Dominguez	Harry Dunn	Sarah Elfreth	Terri Hill	Clarence Lam	Mike Rogers	Other	Undecided
Upwing Research (Note: Poll sponsored by Dunn's campaign)	April 7–10, 2024	400 (LV)	± 4.9%	1%	–	–	**22%**	18%	–	6%	–	7% (Note: John Morse with 3%; "Someone else" with 4%)	**44%**
RMG Research (Note: Poll sponsored by U.S. Term Limits. Hill and Dominguez have signed the group's term-limit pledge.)	February 19–26, 2024	423 (LV)	± 4.8%	2%	3%	3%	7%	**9%**	2%	1%	6%	16% (Note: John Morse with 1%; "Someone else" with 15%)	**51%**
TargetSmart (Note: Poll sponsored by Elfreth's campaign.)	February 20–22, 2024	400 (LV)	± 4.9%	4%	1%	2%	11%	**16%**	4%	9%	2%	–	**39%**
RMG Research	November 28 – December 1, 2023	430 (LV)	± 4.7%	–	–	–	–	**14%**	9%	–	–	15% (Note: Vanessa Atterbeary with 12%; "Someone else" with 3%)	**62%**

==== Fundraising ====
During the Democratic primary, Elfreth received more than $4 million in support from AIPAC's United Democracy Project super PAC, allowing her to overcome the fundraising gap between her and Dunn.

Campaign finance reports as of June 30, 2024
Candidate	Raised	Spent	Cash on hand
Mark Chang (D)	$136,634 (Note: $16,000 of this total was self-funded by Chang)	$122,509	$14,125
Abigail Diehl (D) (Note: As of March 31, 2024)	$81,004 (Note: $25,463 of this total was self-funded by Diehl)	$49,878	$31,126
Juan Dominguez (D)	$379,860 (Note: $170,610 of this total was self-funded by Dominguez)	$379,860	$0
Harry Dunn (D)	$5,444,896 (Note: $114,266 of this total was self-funded by Dunn)	$5,378,736	$1,506,929
Sarah Elfreth (D)	$1,830,237	$1,711,275	$118,962
Terri Hill (D)	$206,003 (Note: $1,500 of this total was self-funded by Hill)	$204,844	$1,159
Aisha Khan (D)	$286,557 (Note: $115,000 of this total was self-funded by Khan)	$283,056	$3,526
Clarence Lam (D)	$913,306	$902,645	$10,661
Matt Libber (D)	$3,159 (Note: $494 of this total was self-funded by Libber)	$1,850	$1,310
John Morse (D)	$157,565	$148,331	$9,234
Don Quinn (D)	$19,688 (Note: $10,000 of this total was self-funded by Quinn)	$20,088	$0
Mike Rogers (D)	$319,534 (Note: $64,000 of this total was self-funded by Rogers)	$314,515	$5,019
Vanessa Atterbeary (D) (Note: Withdrawn)	$19,350	$15,835	$3,515
Michael Coburn (D)	$229,985 (Note: $150,000 of this total was self-funded by Coburn)	$229,985	$0
Source: Federal Election Commission

==== Results ====
Results by county Elfreth: 20–30%; 30–40%; 40–50%

Democratic primary results
Party	Candidate	Votes	%
**Democratic**	**Sarah Elfreth**	**29,459**	**36.2**
Democratic	Harry Dunn	20,380	25.0
Democratic	Clarence Lam	9,548	11.7
Democratic	Terri Hill	5,318	6.5
Democratic	Mark Chang	4,106	5.0
Democratic	Aisha Khan	2,199	2.7
Democratic	Mike Rogers	2,147	2.6
Democratic	John Morse	1,447	1.8
Democratic	Abigail Diehl	1,379	1.7
Democratic	Lindsay Donahue	1,213	1.5
Democratic	Juan Dominguez	1,205	1.3
Democratic	Michael Coburn (withdrawn)	583	0.7
Democratic	Malcolm Thomas Colombo	527	0.7
Democratic	Don Quinn	408	0.5
Democratic	Kristin Lyman Nabors	397	0.5
Democratic	Jeff Woodard	352	0.4
Democratic	Gary Schuman	286	0.4
Democratic	Mark Gosnell	221	0.3
Democratic	Jake Pretot	162	0.2
Democratic	Matt Libber	159	0.2
Democratic	Stewart Silver	78	0.1
Democratic	Danny Rupli	34	<0.1
Total votes		**81,428**	**100.0**

=== Republican primary ===
==== Nominee ====
- Robert Steinberger, attorney

==== Eliminated in primary ====
- Arthur Baker Jr., attorney
- Ray Bly, perennial candidate
- Berney Flowers, former inter-agency technical advisor for NORAD and USNORTHCOM and candidate for the 2nd district in 2022
- Thomas E. "Pinkston" Harris, banking business owner and perennial candidate
- Jordan Mayo, realtor
- Naveed Mian, marketing business owner
- Joshua Morales, perennial candidate
- John Rea, salesman and perennial candidate

==== Declined ====
- Allan Kittleman, former Howard County Executive (2014–2018)
- Yuripzy Morgan, former WBAL radio host and nominee for this district in 2022
- Boyd Rutherford, former lieutenant governor of Maryland (2015–2023)

==== Fundraising ====
Campaign finance reports as of June 30, 2024
Candidate	Raised	Spent	Cash on hand
Arthur Baker (R)	$5,515 (Note: $4,981 of this total was self-funded by Baker)	$9,971	$0
Berney Flowers (R)	$40,227 (Note: $22,677 of this total was self-funded by Flowers)	$37,038	$3,190
Robert Steinberger (R)	$33,754	$28,518	$5,960
Source: Federal Election Commission

==== Results ====
Results by county Steinberger: 20–30%

Republican primary results
Party	Candidate	Votes	%
**Republican**	**Robert Steinberger**	**8,766**	**25.1**
Republican	Arthur Baker Jr.	6,931	19.9
Republican	Berney Flowers	6,028	17.3
Republican	Joshua Morales	3,159	9.1
Republican	Jordan Mayo	2,918	8.4
Republican	Thomas E. "Pinkston" Harris	2,857	8.2
Republican	Ray Bly	2,015	5.8
Republican	John Rea	1,120	3.2
Republican	Naveed Mian	1,085	3.1
Total votes		**34,879**	**100.0**

=== Third-party and independent candidates ===
==== Declared ====
- Miguel Barajas (Libertarian)

=== General election ===
==== Predictions ====
Source	Ranking	As of
The Cook Political Report	Solid D	September 27, 2023
Inside Elections	Solid D	September 15, 2023
Sabato's Crystal Ball	Safe D	October 4, 2023
Elections Daily	Safe D	October 5, 2023
CNalysis	Solid D	November 16, 2023

==== Fundraising ====
Campaign finance reports as of November 25, 2024
Candidate	Raised	Spent	Cash on hand
Sarah Elfreth (D)	$2,270,978	$2,199,652	$71,326
Robert Steinberger (R)	$51,443	$53,083	$0
Source: Federal Election Commission

==== Results ====
2024 Maryland's 3rd congressional district election
Party	Candidate	Votes	%	±%
**Democratic**	**Sarah Elfreth**	**236,681**	**59.29%**	**−0.90%**
Republican	Robert Steinberger	151,186	37.87%	−1.84%
Libertarian	Miguel Barajas	10,471	2.62%	N/A
Write-in		862	0.22%	+0.12%
Total votes		**399,200**	**100.00%**	
Democratic **hold**				

== District 4 ==
2024 Maryland's 4th congressional district election
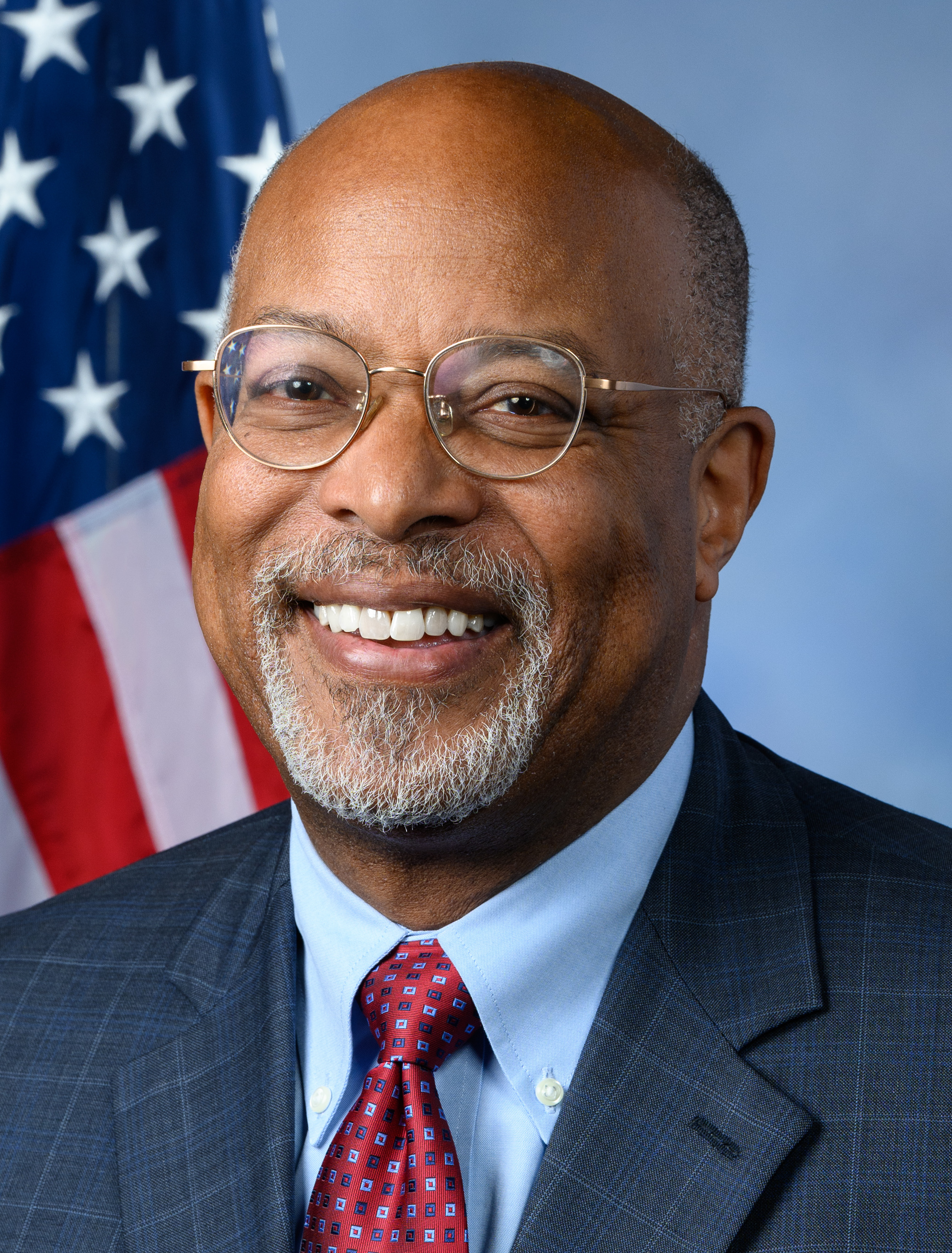

Nominee	Glenn Ivey	George McDermott
Party	Democratic	Republican
Popular vote	239,596	30,454
Percentage	88.4%	11.2%
- Ivey: 60–70% 70–80% 80–90% >90%
U.S. Representative before election
Glenn Ivey
Democratic
Elected U.S. Representative
Glenn Ivey
Democratic

The 4th district encompasses parts of the Washington, D.C. suburbs in Prince George's County, including Landover, Laurel, and Suitland. The incumbent is Democrat Glenn Ivey, who was elected with 90.3% of the vote in 2022.

=== Democratic primary ===
==== Nominee ====
- Glenn Ivey, incumbent U.S. representative

==== Eliminated in primary ====
- Joseph Gomes
- Emmett Johnson, insurance business owner
- Gabriel Njinimbot, paralegal and entrepreneur

==== Endorsements ====
Glenn Ivey

Organizations

- AIPAC
- Democratic Majority for Israel
- Humane Society Legislative Fund
- Jewish Democratic Council of America
- Planned Parenthood Action Fund
- Pro-Israel America
- Sierra Club National and Maryland chapters

Labor unions

- American Federation of State, County and Municipal Employees Council 3
- Maryland State & D.C. AFL-CIO
- National Association of Social Workers
- SMART Union
- United Auto Workers

==== Fundraising ====
Campaign finance reports as of June 30, 2024
Candidate	Raised	Spent	Cash on hand
Gabriel Njinimbot (D)	$68,533	$63,176	$5,357
Glenn Ivey (D)	$699,817	$573,459	$252,885
Source: Federal Election Commission

==== Results ====
Democratic primary results
Party	Candidate	Votes	%
Democratic	Glenn Ivey (incumbent)	66,659	84.9
Democratic	Gabriel Njinimbot	4,366	5.6
Democratic	Emmett Johnson	3,835	4.9
Democratic	Joseph Gomes	3,673	4.7
Total votes		78,533	100.0

=== Republican primary ===
==== Nominee ====
- George McDermott, perennial candidate

==== Results ====
Republican primary results
Party	Candidate	Votes	%
Republican	George McDermott	3,563	100.0
Total votes		3,563	100.0

=== General election ===
==== Predictions ====
Source	Ranking	As of
The Cook Political Report	Solid D	September 27, 2023
Inside Elections	Solid D	September 15, 2023
Sabato's Crystal Ball	Safe D	October 4, 2023
Elections Daily	Safe D	October 5, 2023
CNalysis	Solid D	November 16, 2023

==== Fundraising ====
Campaign finance reports as of November 25, 2024
Candidate	Raised	Spent	Cash on hand
Glenn Ivey (D)	$929,456	$750,688	$305,295
Source: Federal Election Commission

==== Results ====
2024 Maryland's 4th congressional district election
Party	Candidate	Votes	%	±%
Democratic	Glenn Ivey (incumbent)	239,596	88.42%	−1.68%
Republican	George McDermott	30,454	11.24%	+1.59%
Write-in		920	0.34%	+0.09%
Total votes		270,970	100.00%	
Democratic hold				

== District 5 ==
2024 Maryland's 5th congressional district election
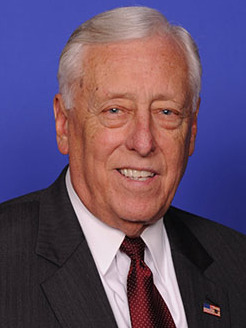

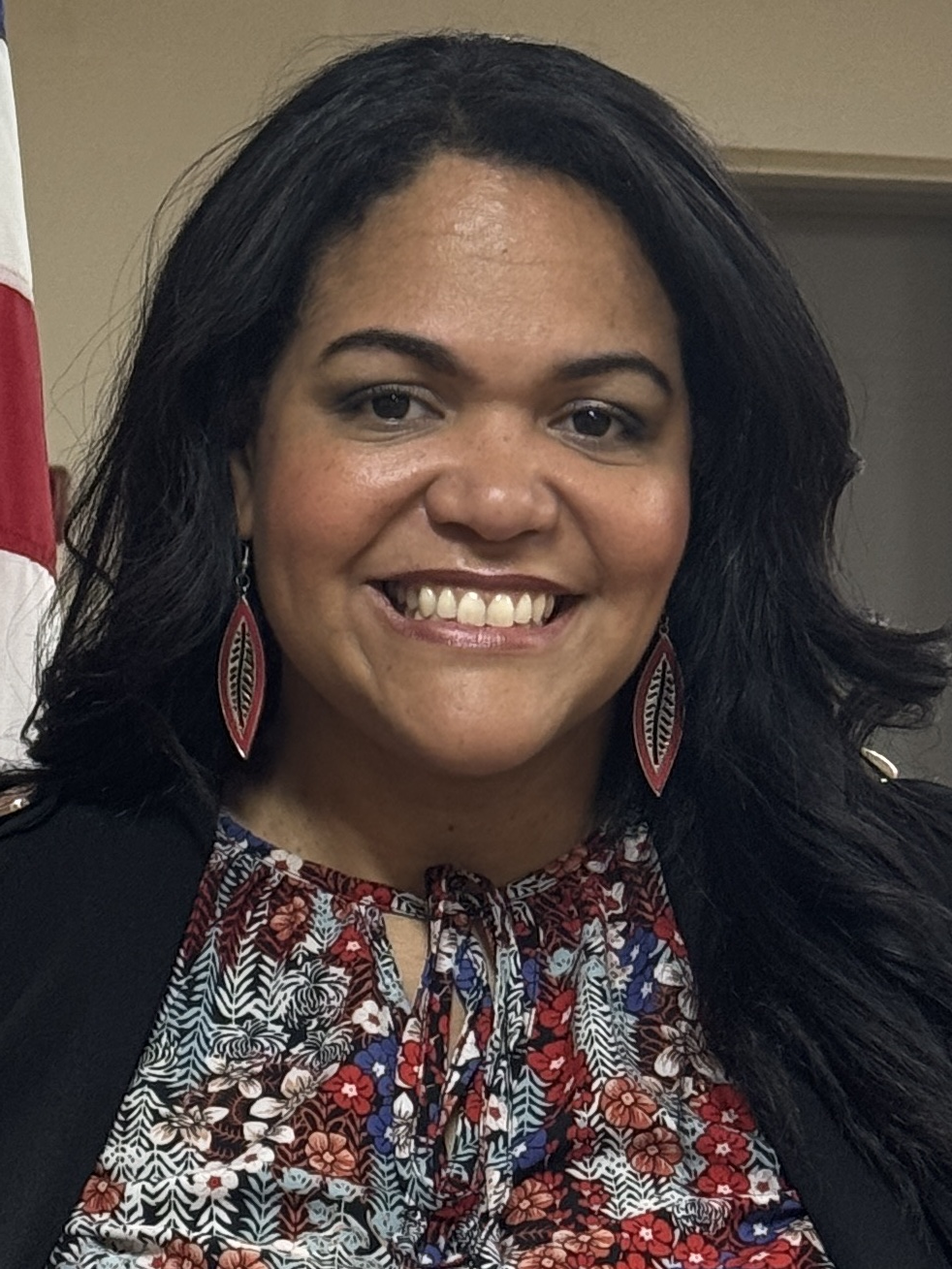
Nominee	Steny Hoyer	Michelle Talkington
Party	Democratic	Republican
Popular vote	283,619	133,985
Percentage	67.8%	32.0%
- Hoyer: 50–60% 60–70% 70–80% 80–90% >90% Talkington: 40–50% 50–60% 60–70% No votes
U.S. Representative before election
Steny Hoyer
Democratic
Elected U.S. Representative
Steny Hoyer
Democratic

The 5th district is based in southern Maryland, and encompasses Charles, St. Mary's, Calvert counties and a small portion of southern Anne Arundel County, as well as the Washington, D.C. suburbs of Bowie and Upper Marlboro. The incumbent is Democrat Steny Hoyer, who was re-elected with 66.0% of the vote in 2022.

=== Democratic primary ===
==== Nominee ====
- Steny Hoyer, incumbent U.S. representative

==== Eliminated in primary ====
- Quincy Bareebe, accountant
- Andrea Crooms, director of the Prince George's County Department of the Environment (2021–present)

==== Withdrawn ====
- Leonard Proctor, chair of the Charles County Democratic Central Committee
- Mckayla Wilkes, administrative assistant and candidate for this district in 2020 and 2022 (remained on ballot)

==== Declined ====
- Angela Alsobrooks, Prince George's County Executive (2018–present) (ran for U.S. Senate)
- Colin Byrd, Greenbelt city councilor (2017–present) and candidate for U.S. Senate in 2022

==== Endorsements ====
Endorsements in bold were made after the primary elections.

Andrea Crooms

Organizations

- Friends of the Earth Action
- Maryland Forward Party
Steny Hoyer

Organizations

- AIPAC
- **Brady PAC**
- Democratic Majority for Israel
- **Everytown for Gun Safety Action Fund**
- Feminist Majority PAC
- **Giffords**
- Humane Society Legislative Fund
- **Planned Parenthood Action Fund**
- Pro-Israel America
- **Reproductive Freedom for All**

Labor unions

- **American Federation of State, County and Municipal Employees Council 3**
- **Maryland State & D.C. AFL-CIO**
- National Education Association
- **SMART Union**
- United Auto Workers

==== Fundraising ====
Campaign finance reports as of June 30, 2024
Candidate	Raised	Spent	Cash on hand
Quincy Bareebe (D)	$270,317 (Note: $209,665 of this total was self-funded by Bareebe.)	$270,004	$313
Andrea Crooms (D)	$61,017 (Note: $17,175 of this total was self-funded by Crooms.)	$101,498	$0
Steny Hoyer (D)	$1,451,236	$1,391,283	$786,850
Source: Federal Election Commission

==== Results ====
Results by county Hoyer: 60–70%; 70–80%; 80–90%

Democratic primary results
Party	Candidate	Votes	%
**Democratic**	**Steny Hoyer (incumbent)**	**69,723**	**72.3**
Democratic	Quincy Bareebe	9,970	10.3
Democratic	McKayla Wilkes (withdrawn)	9,743	10.1
Democratic	Andrea Crooms	6,955	7.2
Total votes		**96,391**	**100.0**

=== Republican primary ===
==== Nominee ====
- Michelle Talkington, businesswoman, youth minister, and nominee for SD-28 in 2022

==== Results ====
Republican primary results
Party	Candidate	Votes	%
**Republican**	**Michelle Talkington**	**27,202**	**100.0**
Total votes		**27,202**	**100.0**

==== Fundraising ====
Campaign finance reports as of June 30, 2024
Candidate	Raised	Spent	Cash on hand
Michelle Talkington (R)	$10,198 (Note: $4,293 of this total was self-funded by Talkington)	$7,015	$3,183
Source: Federal Election Commission

=== General election ===
==== Predictions ====
Source	Ranking	As of
The Cook Political Report	Solid D	September 27, 2023
Inside Elections	Solid D	September 15, 2023
Sabato's Crystal Ball	Safe D	October 4, 2023
Elections Daily	Safe D	October 5, 2023
CNalysis	Solid D	November 16, 2023

==== Fundraising ====
Campaign finance reports as of November 25, 2024
Candidate	Raised	Spent	Cash on hand
Steny Hoyer (D)	$1,756,898	$1,794,971	$688,824
Michelle Talkington (R)	$21,973 (Note: $6,582 of this total was self-funded by Talkington)	$19,059	$2,915
Source: Federal Election Commission

==== Results ====
2024 Maryland's 5th congressional district election
Party	Candidate	Votes	%	±%
**Democratic**	**Steny Hoyer (incumbent)**	**283,619**	**67.75%**	**+1.85%**
Republican	Michelle Talkington	133,985	32.01%	−1.93%
Write-in		999	0.24%	+0.08%
Total votes		**418,603**	**100.00%**	
Democratic **hold**				

== District 6 ==
2024 Maryland's 6th congressional district election
- November 5, 2024
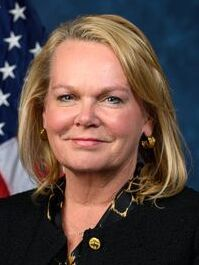

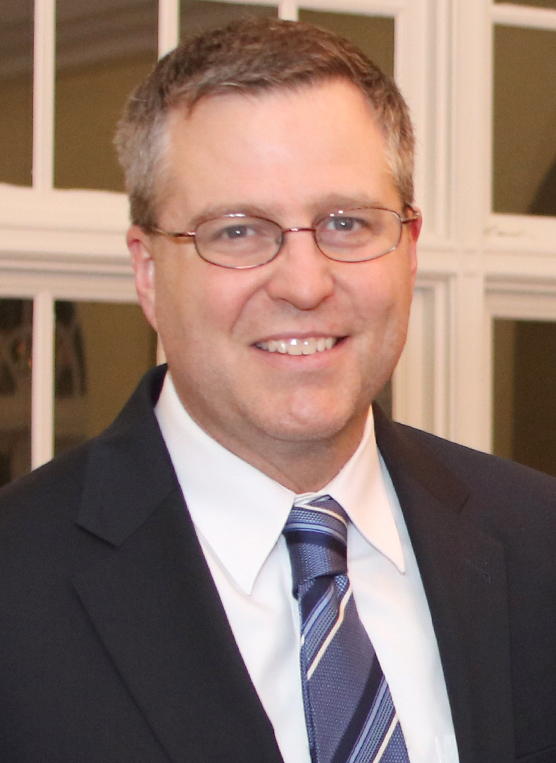
Nominee	April McClain Delaney	Neil Parrott
Party	Democratic	Republican
Popular vote	199,788	175,974
Percentage	53.05%	46.72%
- McClain Delaney: 50–60% 60–70% 70–80% 80–90% Parrott: 40–50% 50–60% 60–70% 70–80% 80–90%
U.S. Representative before election
David Trone
Democratic
Elected U.S. Representative
April McClain Delaney
Democratic

The 6th district is based in western Maryland. It covers all of Garrett, Allegany, Washington, and Frederick counties, and extends south into the Washington, D.C. suburbs in Montgomery County, including Germantown and Gaithersburg. The incumbent is Democrat David Trone, who was re-elected with 54.7% of the vote in 2022. Trone declined to seek re-election, instead choosing to run for U.S. Senate.

=== Democratic primary ===
==== Nominee ====
- April McClain Delaney, former deputy administrator of the National Telecommunications and Information Administration and wife of former U.S. Representative John Delaney

==== Eliminated in primary ====
- George Gluck, IT consultant and perennial candidate
- Ashwani Jain, former Obama administration official and candidate for governor of Maryland in 2022
- Lesley Lopez, state delegate from the 39th district (2019–present)
- Tekesha Martinez, mayor of Hagerstown (2023–present)
- Mohammad Mozumder, retired scientist
- Adrian Petrus, security guard and perennial candidate
- Laurie-Anne Sayles, at-large Montgomery County councilor (2022–present)
- Joe Vogel, state delegate from the 17th district (2023–present)
- Destiny Drake West, think tank founder and former senior program specialist at the U.S. Department of Housing and Urban Development
- Kiambo White, union representative
- Altimont Wilks, grocery store owner

==== Results ====
Results by county McClain Delaney: 30–40%; 40–50%

Democratic primary results
Party	Candidate	Votes	%
Democratic	April McClain Delaney	22,985	40.4
Democratic	Joe Vogel	14,940	26.3
Democratic	Ashwani Jain	4,750	8.3
Democratic	Tekesha Martinez	3,992	7.0
Democratic	Lesley Lopez	2,600	4.6
Democratic	Laurie-Anne Sayles	1,845	3.2
Democratic	Destiny Drake West	1,086	1.9
Democratic	Mohammad Mozumder	1,005	1.7
Democratic	Joel Martin Rubin (withdrawn)	820	1.4
Democratic	Peter Choharis (withdrawn)	818	1.4
Democratic	Geoffrey Grammer (withdrawn)	651	1.1
Democratic	George Gluck	437	0.8
Democratic	Kiambo White	401	0.7
Democratic	Stephen McDow (withdrawn)	246	0.4
Democratic	Altimont Wilks	179	0.3
Democratic	Adrian Petrus	166	0.3
Total votes		56,921	100.0

=== Republican primary ===
==== Nominee ====
- Neil Parrott, former state delegate from district 2A (2015–2023) and nominee for this district in 2020 and 2022

==== Eliminated in primary ====
- Dan Cox, former state delegate from the 4th district (2019–2023), nominee for governor of Maryland in 2022, and nominee for the 8th district in 2016
- Chris Hyser, retired state trooper
- Mariela Roca, medical logistics specialist and candidate for this district in 2022
- Tom Royals, business development manager and former U.S. Navy officer
- Brenda Thiam, former state delegate from district 2B (2020–2023)

==== Results ====
Results by county Parrott: 30–40%; 40–50%; 60–70%

Republican primary results
Party	Candidate	Votes	%
Republican	Neil Parrott	22,604	45.9
Republican	Dan Cox	14,797	30.1
Republican	Mariela Roca	6,071	12.3
Republican	Tom Royals	2,060	4.2
Republican	Chris Hyser	1,625	3.3
Republican	Brenda Thiam	1,607	3.3
Republican	Todd Puglisi (withdrawn)	446	0.9
Total votes		49,210	100.0

=== General election ===
==== Predictions ====
Source	Ranking	As of
The Cook Political Report	Lean D	November 1, 2024
Inside Elections	Lean D	October 31, 2024
Sabato's Crystal Ball	Lean D	November 4, 2024
Elections Daily	Safe D	October 5, 2023
CNalysis	Very Likely D	November 16, 2023

==== Results ====
2024 Maryland's 6th congressional district election
Party	Candidate	Votes	%	±%
Democratic	April McClain Delaney	199,788	53.05%	−1.67%
Republican	Neil Parrott	175,974	46.72%	+1.57%
Write-in		862	0.23%	+0.10%
Total votes		376,624	100.00%	
Democratic hold				

== District 7 ==
2024 Maryland's 7th congressional district election
- November 5, 2024
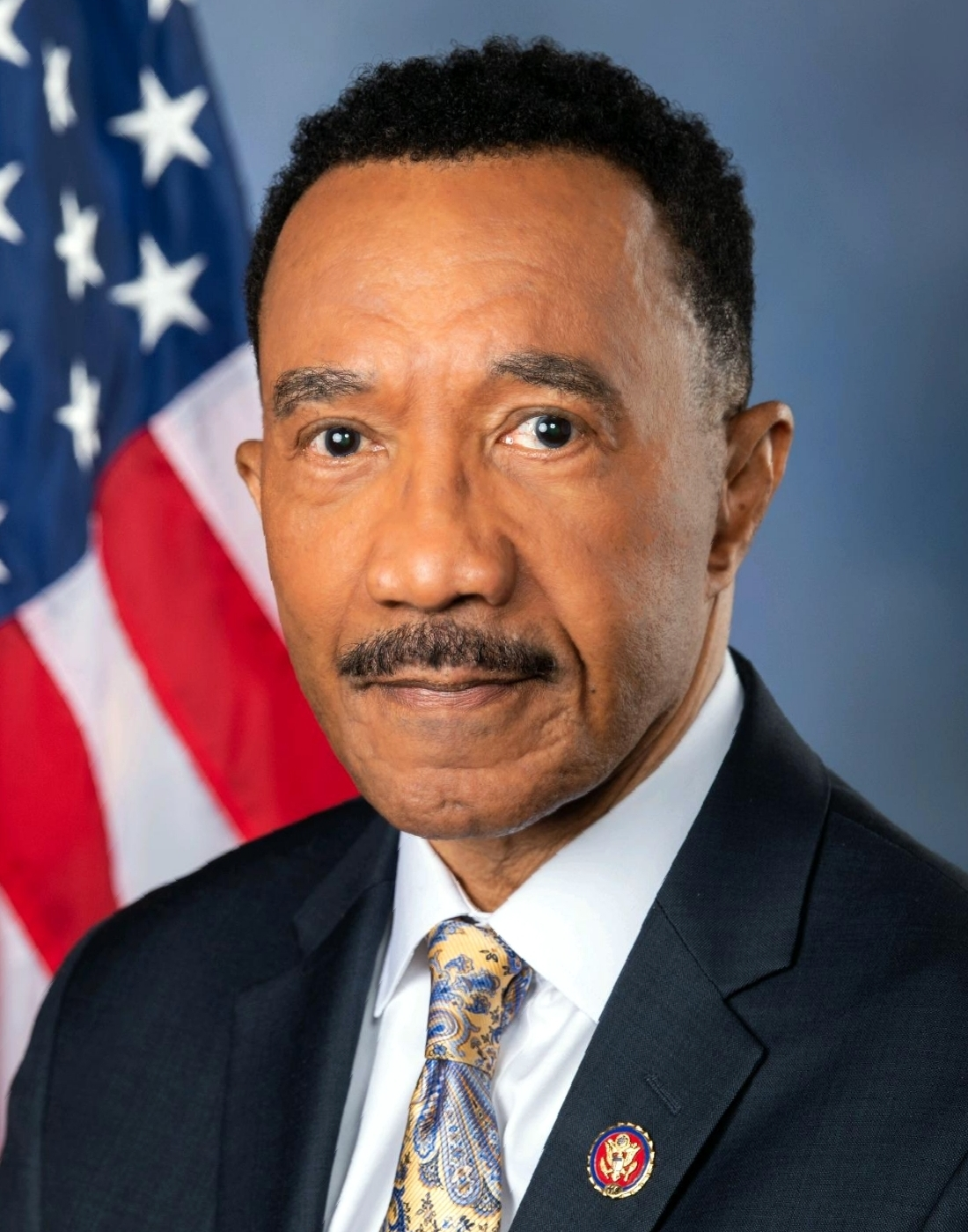

Candidate	Kweisi Mfume	Scott Collier
Party	Democratic	Republican
Popular vote	232,849	49,799
Percentage	80.3%	17.2%
- Mfume: 50–60% 60–70% 70–80% 80–90% >90% Collier: 40–50% 50–60% 60–70% 70–80% Tie: 50%
U.S. Representative before election
Kweisi Mfume
Democratic
Elected U.S. Representative
Kweisi Mfume
Democratic

The 7th district includes most of Baltimore and some of its suburbs. The incumbent is Democrat Kweisi Mfume, who was re-elected with 82.2% of the vote in 2022.

=== Democratic primary ===
==== Nominee ====
- Kweisi Mfume, incumbent U.S. representative

==== Eliminated in primary ====
- Tashi Kimandus Davis, project manager and candidate for this district in 2022

==== Endorsements ====
Endorsements in bold were made after the primary elections.

Kweisi Mfume

Organizations

- AIPAC
- **Humane Society Legislative Fund**
- Sierra Club National and Maryland chapters

Labor unions

- **American Federation of State, County and Municipal Employees Council 3**
- **Maryland State & D.C. AFL-CIO**
- National Education Association
- **SMART Union**
- United Auto Workers

Newspapers

- Baltimore Afro-American

==== Fundraising ====
Campaign finance reports as of June 30, 2024
Candidate	Raised	Spent	Cash on hand
Kweisi Mfume (D)	$335,294	$221,730	$704,993
Source: Federal Election Commission

==== Results ====
Democratic primary results
Party	Candidate	Votes	%
**Democratic**	**Kweisi Mfume (incumbent)**	**88,727**	**88.4**
Democratic	Tashi Kimandus Davis	11,640	11.6
Total votes		**100,367**	**100.0**

=== Republican primary ===
==== Nominee ====
- Scott Collier, perennial candidate and nominee for this district in 2022

==== Eliminated in primary ====
- Wayne McNeal, Democratic candidate for this district in 2022
- Lorrie Sigley, nurse and candidate for this district in 2022

==== Results ====
Republican primary results
Party	Candidate	Votes	%
**Republican**	**Scott Collier**	**4,289**	**47.4**
Republican	Wayne McNeal	2,804	31.0
Republican	Lorrie Sigley	1,951	21.6
Total votes		**9,044**	**100.0**

=== Third-party and independent candidates ===
==== Declared ====
- Ronald Owens-Bey (Libertarian), Republican candidate for HD-45 in 2018

=== General election ===
==== Predictions ====
Source	Ranking	As of
The Cook Political Report	Solid D	September 27, 2023
Inside Elections	Solid D	September 15, 2023
Sabato's Crystal Ball	Safe D	October 4, 2023
Elections Daily	Safe D	October 5, 2023
CNalysis	Solid D	November 16, 2023

==== Fundraising ====
Campaign finance reports as of November 25, 2024
Candidate	Raised	Spent	Cash on hand
Kweisi Mfume (D)	$533,334	$409,622	$715,141
Source: Federal Election Commission

==== Results ====
2024 Maryland's 7th congressional district election
Party	Candidate	Votes	%	±%
**Democratic**	**Kweisi Mfume (incumbent)**	**232,849**	**80.25%**	**−1.81%**
Republican	Scott Collier	49,799	17.16%	−0.55%
Libertarian	Ronald Owens-Bey	6,840	2.36%	N/A
Write-in		649	0.22%	-0.01%
Total votes		**290,137**	**100.00%**	
Democratic **hold**				

== District 8 ==
2024 Maryland's 8th congressional district election
- November 5, 2024
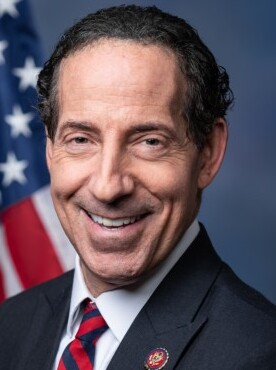

Candidate	Jamie Raskin	Cheryl Riley
Party	Democratic	Republican
Popular vote	292,101	77,821
Percentage	76.8%	20.5%
- Raskin: 40–50% 50–60% 60–70% 70–80% 80–90% >90%
U.S. Representative before election
Jamie Raskin
Democratic
Elected U.S. Representative
Jamie Raskin
Democratic

The 8th district encompasses the inner suburbs of Washington, D.C., and is located entirely within Montgomery County. The incumbent is Democrat Jamie Raskin, who was re-elected with 80.3% of the vote in 2022.

=== Democratic primary ===
==== Nominee ====
- Jamie Raskin, incumbent U.S. representative

==== Eliminated in primary ====
- Eric Felber, physician

==== Declined ====
- Will Jawando, at-large Montgomery County councilor (2018–present) and candidate for this district in 2016
- Tom Perez, former chair of the Democratic National Committee (2017–2021), former U.S. Secretary of Labor (2013–2017), former Maryland Secretary of Labor (2007–2009), and candidate for Governor of Maryland in 2022

==== Endorsements ====
Endorsements in bold were made after the primary elections.

Jamie Raskin

U.S representatives

- Gabby Giffords, U.S. representative from Arizona's 8th congressional district (2007–2012)

Organizations

- **Brady PAC**
- End Citizens United
- **Everytown for Gun Safety Action Fund**
- Feminist Majority PAC
- Friends of the Earth Action
- Giffords
- Humane Society Legislative Fund
- Jewish Democratic Council of America
- Joint Action Committee for Political Affairs
- J Street PAC
- Planned Parenthood Action Fund
- Population Connection Action Fund
- Sierra Club National and Maryland chapters

Labor unions

- **American Federation of State, County and Municipal Employees Council 3**
- **Maryland State & D.C. AFL-CIO**
- **National Association of Social Workers**
- National Education Association
- **SMART Union**
- United Auto Workers

==== Fundraising ====
Campaign finance reports as of June 30, 2024
Candidate	Raised	Spent	Cash on hand
Jamie Raskin (D)	$3,616,675	$2,234,346	$4,503,328
Source: Federal Election Commission

==== Results ====
Democratic primary results
Party	Candidate	Votes	%
**Democratic**	**Jamie Raskin (incumbent)**	**103,071**	**94.8**
Democratic	Eric Felber	5,636	5.2
Total votes		**108,707**	**100.0**

=== Republican primary ===
==== Nominee ====
- Cheryl Riley, public relations consultant

==== Eliminated in primary ====
- Michael Yadeta, engineer and candidate for this district in 2020 and 2022

==== Fundraising ====
Campaign finance reports as of June 30, 2024
Candidate	Raised	Spent	Cash on hand
Cheryl Riley (R)	$2,183	$152	$2,031
Source: Federal Election Commission

==== Results ====
Republican primary results
Party	Candidate	Votes	%
**Republican**	**Cheryl Riley**	**9,647**	**69.2**
Republican	Michael Yadeta	4,290	30.8
Total votes		**13,937**	**100.0**

=== Third-party and independent candidates ===
==== Candidates ====
===== Declared =====
- Nancy Wallace (Green), tech consultant, nominee for governor of Maryland in 2022, and nominee for this district in 2016 (previously ran for U.S. Senate)

=== General election ===
==== Predictions ====
Source	Ranking	As of
The Cook Political Report	Solid D	September 27, 2023
Inside Elections	Solid D	September 15, 2023
Sabato's Crystal Ball	Safe D	October 4, 2023
Elections Daily	Safe D	October 5, 2023
CNalysis	Solid D	November 16, 2023

==== Fundraising ====
Campaign finance reports as of November 25, 2024
Candidate	Raised	Spent	Cash on hand
Jamie Raskin (D)	$4,745,819	$2,903,862	$4,962,955
Cheryl Riley (R)	$13,872	$10,883	$2,989
Source: Federal Election Commission

==== Results ====
2024 Maryland's 8th congressional district election
Party	Candidate	Votes	%	±%
**Democratic**	**Jamie Raskin (incumbent)**	**292,101**	**76.80%**	**−3.38%**
Republican	Cheryl Riley	77,821	20.46%	+2.31%
Green	Nancy Wallace	9,612	2.53%	N/A
Write-in		786	0.21%	+0.11%
Total votes		**380,320**	**100.00%**	
Democratic **hold**				

== Notes ==
Partisan clients
