= Mike Rogers (Maryland politician) =

American politician (born 1964)

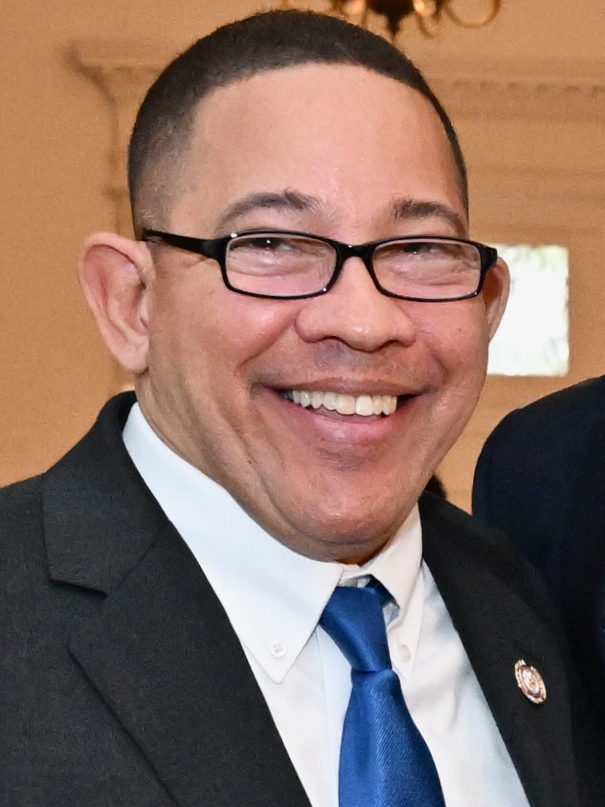

Member of the Maryland House of Delegates from the 32nd district
- Incumbent
- Assumed office January 9, 2019 Serving with J. Sandy Barlett, Mark S. Chang
- Preceded by: Pamela Beidle; Alice Sophocleus

Personal details
- Born: February 20, 1964 (age 62) Detroit, Michigan, U.S.
- Party: Democratic
- Children: 2
- Education: Hillcrest High School; New Hanover High School
- Website: Official website

Military service
- Branch/service: United States Army
- Years of service: 1986–2015
- Rank: Colonel
- Unit: Medical Service Corps

Michael James Rogers (born February 20, 1964) is an American politician and a Democratic member of the Maryland House of Delegates, representing Maryland's District 32 in Anne Arundel County. He unsuccessfully ran in the 2024 U.S. House of Representatives election in Maryland's 3rd congressional district, losing to state senator Sarah Elfreth.

== Early life ==
Rogers was born in Detroit on February 20, 1964. He attended Hillcrest High School in Dalzell, South Carolina, and graduated from New Hanover High School in Wilmington, North Carolina, in 1982.

== Career ==
=== Early career ===
Rogers served in the U.S. Army Medical Service Corps from 1986 to 2015, serving in positions ranging from platoon leader to brigade commander and retiring at the rank of colonel. He had deployments 32 countries including combat deployments in Somalia, Saudi Arabia, Kuwait, Iraq, and Afghanistan; and his service awards include the Bronze Star, Legion of Merit with Oak Leaf Cluster, and Defense Superior Service Medal. Since retiring from the Army, he has served as a member of the Military Officers Association of America board of directors from 2012 to 2018 and has coached football at the Severn Athletic Club for five seasons.

=== Political involvement ===
==== Maryland House of Delegates ====
In January 2018, Rogers announced his candidacy for the Maryland House of Delegates in District 32. The district was targeted by the Maryland Republican Party and the Republican State Leadership Committee, who had hoped to defeat the Maryland Democratic Party's supermajority in the legislature. He won the Democratic primary, placing third in a field of seven candidates and receiving 18.4 percent of the vote, and defeated his Republican challengers in the general election with 19.9 percent of the vote.

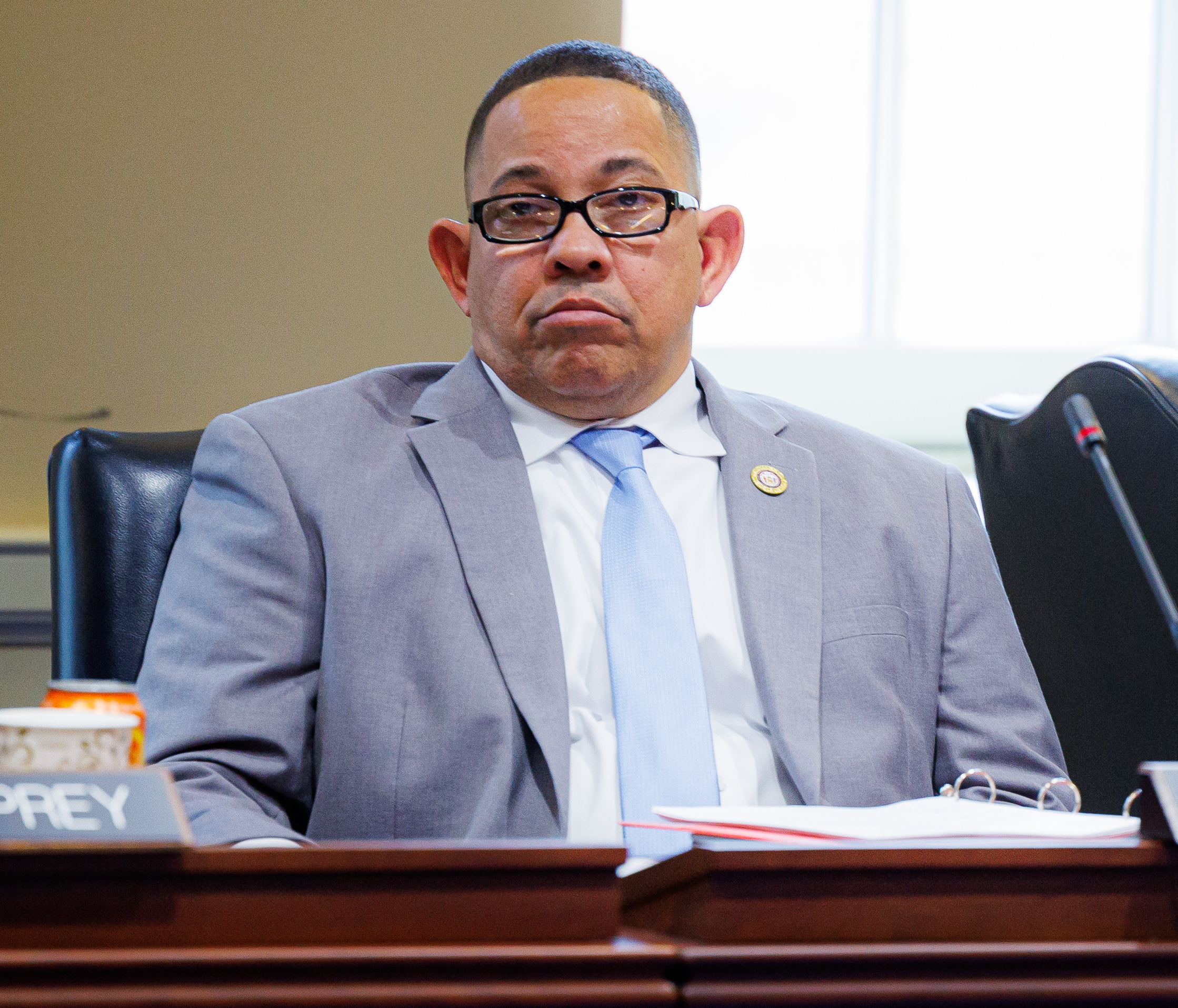
Rogers in the House Economic Matters Committee, 2025

Rogers was sworn into the Maryland House of Delegates on January 9, 2019. He served on the Economic Matters Committee until 2027, afterwards serving on the Economic Matters Committee. In December 2020, Rogers became the first Black person to serve as vice chair of the Anne Arundel County Delegation, and became the first Black man elected as the delegation's chair in November 2021.

In 2020, Rogers unsuccessfully ran as an uncommitted delegate to the 2020 Democratic National Convention, receiving 0.8 percent of the vote in the Democratic primary election.

==== 2024 congressional campaign ====
On November 20, 2023, Rogers announced that he would run for Congress in Maryland's 3rd congressional district, seeking to succeed retiring U.S. Representative John Sarbanes. On the campaign trail, Rogers heavily leaned into his military experience, believing that appealing to the districts' high number of veterans would provide him with a path to victory. Rogers was defeated in the Democratic primary election by state senator Sarah Elfreth on May 14, 2024, placing seventh with 2.6 percent of the vote.

== Political positions ==
=== Policing ===
In June 2020, Rogers participated in a protest against police brutality in Severn, Maryland, where he encouraged protesters to vote in that year's general elections.

=== Social issues ===
In March 2019, Rogers voted against legislation that would allow doctors to prescribe palliative care to terminally ill patients who want to end their lives.

=== Veterans ===
Rogers introduced legislation in the 2020 legislative session that clarified the eligibility for veterans seeking to reside at homes supervised by the Department of Veterans Affairs. The bill passed and became law on May 8, 2020.

== Electoral history ==
Maryland House of Delegates District 32 Democratic primary election, 2018
Party	Candidate	Votes	%
Democratic	Mark S. Chang (incumbent)	4,591	22.3
Democratic	J. Sandy Bartlett	4,200	20.4
Democratic	Mike Rogers	3,795	18.4
Democratic	Jenese Jones	2,639	12.8
Democratic	Patrick Armstrong	1,939	9.4
Democratic	Theodore J. Sophocleus (incumbent) †	1,863	9.0
Democratic	Derek Kent	1,583	7.7

Maryland House of Delegates District 32 election, 2018
Party	Candidate	Votes	%
Democratic	Mark S. Chang (incumbent)	24,498	20.9
Democratic	J. Sandy Bartlett	24,220	20.7
Democratic	Mike Rogers	23,316	19.9
Republican	Patty Ewing	16,340	13.9
Republican	Mark E. Bailey	14,520	12.4
Republican	Tim Walters	14,158	12.1
Write-in		150	0.1

Maryland House of Delegates District 32 election, 2022
Party	Candidate	Votes	%
Democratic	Mark S. Chang (incumbent)	21,755	22.4
Democratic	J. Sandy Bartlett (incumbent)	20,988	21.6
Democratic	Mike Rogers (incumbent)	20,597	21.2
Republican	Monica L. W. Smearman	11,384	11.7
Republican	Michael Jette	11,213	11.5
Republican	Michele Speakman	11,169	11.5
Write-in		107	0.1

Maryland's 3rd congressional district Democratic primary results, 2024
Party	Candidate	Votes	%
Democratic	Sarah Elfreth	29,459	36.2
Democratic	Harry Dunn	20,380	25.0
Democratic	Clarence Lam	9,548	11.7
Democratic	Terri Hill	5,318	6.5
Democratic	Mark Chang	4,106	5.0
Democratic	Aisha Khan	2,199	2.7
Democratic	Mike Rogers	2,147	2.6
Democratic	John Morse	1,447	1.8
Democratic	Abigail Diehl	1,379	1.7
Democratic	Lindsay Donahue	1,213	1.5
Democratic	Juan Dominguez	1,205	1.3
Democratic	Michael Coburn (withdrawn)	583	0.7
Democratic	Malcolm Thomas Colombo	527	0.7
Democratic	Don Quinn	408	0.5
Democratic	Kristin Lyman Nabors	397	0.5
Democratic	Jeff Woodard	352	0.4
Democratic	Gary Schuman	286	0.4
Democratic	Mark Gosnell	221	0.3
Democratic	Jake Pretot	162	0.2
Democratic	Matt Libber	159	0.2
Democratic	Stewart Silver	78	0.1
Democratic	Danny Rupli	34	<0.1
