= Mark S. Chang =

American politician (born 1976)

Mark Chang
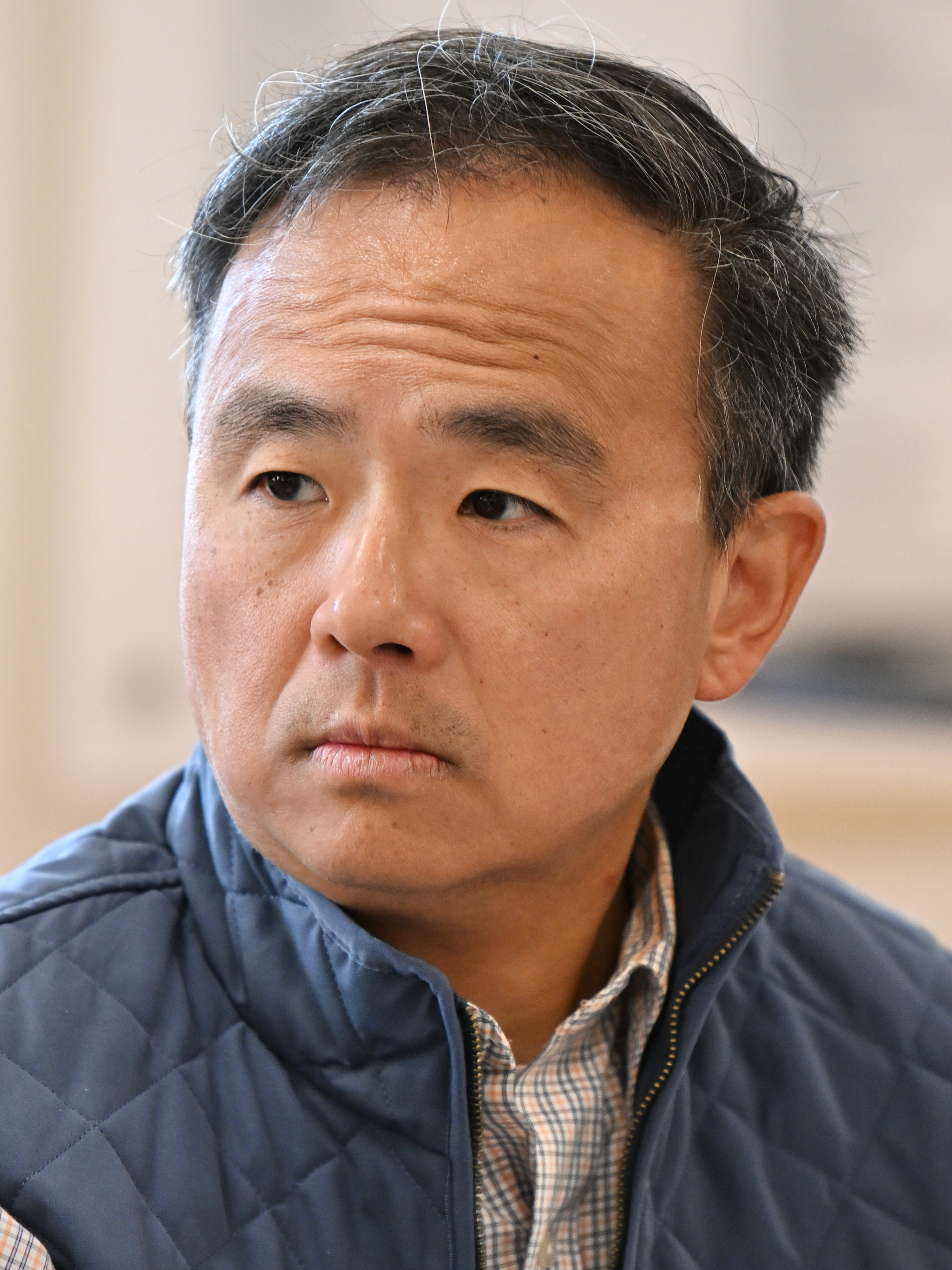

Member-elect of the Maryland Senate from the 32nd district
- Assuming office January 13, 2027
- Succeeding: Pamela Beidle

Member of the Maryland House of Delegates from the 32nd district
- Incumbent
- Assumed office January 14, 2015
- Preceded by: Mary Ann Love

Personal details
- Born: Mark Soo Chang; July 9, 1976 (age 50) Glen Burnie, Maryland, U.S.
- Party: Republican (before 2012); Democratic (since 2012)
- Education: University of Maryland, Baltimore County (BA); Loyola University Maryland (MBA)

Mark Soo Chang (born July 9, 1976) is an American politician who is a member-elect of the Maryland Senate from District 32. A member of the Democratic Party, he has represented District 32 in the Maryland House of Delegates since 2015.

Born and raised in Glen Burnie, Maryland, Chang graduated from the University of Maryland, Baltimore County and Loyola University Maryland. He unsuccessfully ran for the Maryland House of Delegates as a Republican in 2006, afterwards working as a community liaison for Anne Arundel County executive John R. Leopold and as a legislative aide to state senator James E. DeGrange Sr. Chang ran for the Maryland House of Delegates as a Democrat in 2014 and was reelected in 2018 and 2022. In 2024, he unsuccessfully ran in the 2024 U.S. House of Representatives election in Maryland's 3rd congressional district, losing to state senator Sarah Elfreth in the Democratic primary.

Chang was elected to the Maryland Senate in 2026.

== Early life and education ==
Chang was born on July 9, 1976, in Glen Burnie, Maryland. He was one of three children born to Hak Jin Chang, who was a small business owner during the 1980s and 1990s, and his wife, who worked at Annapolis General Hospital and who died when Chang was eleven years old. He is a first-generation Korean-American, with his parents having moved to the United States from South Korea in 1975.

Chang graduated from Glen Burnie High School and later attended the University of Maryland, Baltimore County, where he earned a Bachelor of Arts degree in psychology and graduated cum laude in 1999. In 2010, Chang attended Loyola University Maryland, where he earned a Master of Business Administration degree.

== Political career ==
Chang entered politics in 2003 by becoming a member of the Anne Arundel County Republican Central Committee. In 2006, he ran for the Maryland House of Delegates as a Republican and was defeated in the general election with 17.1 percent of the vote. After his defeat, Chang went to work as a community liaison for Anne Arundel County Executive John R. Leopold. In 2012, he switched his party affiliation from Republican to Democratic. Chang was replaced by County Executive Laura Neuman after she took office following Leopold's corruption conviction and subsequent resignation, and he subsequently worked as a legislative aide to state senator James E. DeGrange Sr.

In 2014, Chang again ran for the Maryland House of Delegates in District 32, this time as a Democrat. He won the general election in November 2014, becoming the first Korean-American elected to the Maryland General Assembly from Anne Arundel County, and the first in the state alongside state delegate-elect David Moon.

== In the legislature ==
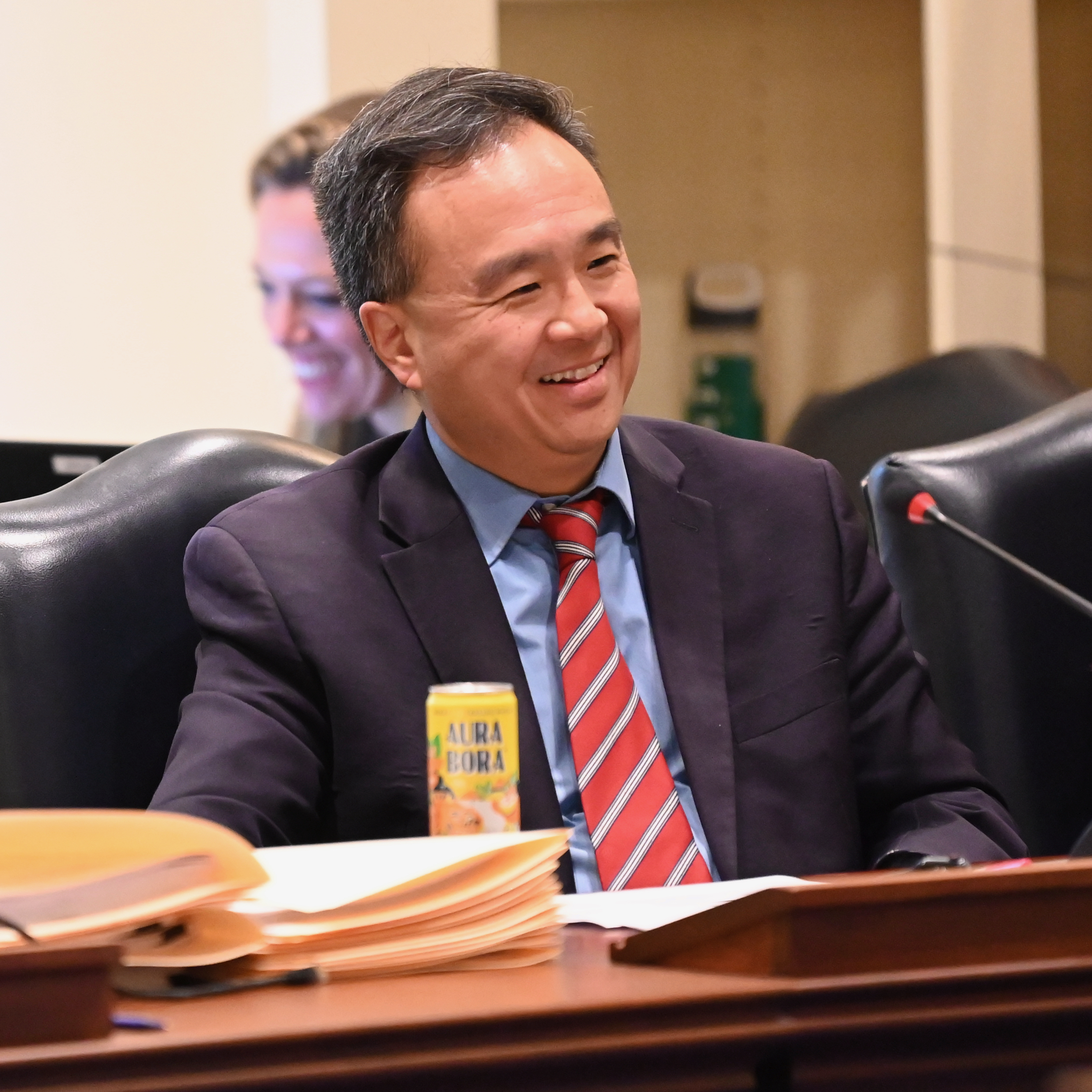
Chang in the House Appropriations Committee, 2024

Chang was sworn into the House of Delegates on January 14, 2015. He was a member of the Appropriations Committee during his entire tenure, including as the committee's vice chair from 2021 to 2025.

On December 5, 2023, Chang announced that he would run for Congress in Maryland's 3rd congressional district, seeking to succeed retiring U.S. Representative John Sarbanes. He was defeated in the Democratic primary election by state senator Sarah Elfreth on May 14, 2024, placing fifth with 5.0 percent of the vote.

In February 2026, Chang announced that he would run for the Maryland Senate in 2026, seeking to succeed state senator Pamela Beidle, who had announced her retirement hours before the candidate filing deadline and endorsed Chang to succeed her. During his campaign, he said he would prioritize protecting state investments and assisting families facing economic strain, especially those affected by cuts to Medicaid and Supplemental Nutrition Assistance Program benefits by the One Big Beautiful Bill Act. Chang defeated Republican challenger Justin Gallucci in the general election on November 3, 2026, becoming the first Korean American elected to the Maryland Senate. He was assigned to the Senate Education, Energy, and the Environment Committee at the start of the 2027 legislative session.

== Political positions ==
=== Crime ===
During the 2018 legislative session, Chang introduced legislation to make human trafficking a felony offense.

In March 2021, Chang expressed concern following the 2021 Atlanta spa shootings and later attended and spoke at a rally at the Lincoln Memorial honoring the victims.

=== Development initiatives ===
During the 2016 legislative session, Chang voted to override Governor Larry Hogan's veto on a bill to provide $2 million toward Maryland Hall for the Creative Arts renovations.

In 2019, Chang introduced legislation to fund developments at the Laurel Park.

=== Social issues ===
In January 2016, Chang voted against overriding Governor Larry Hogan's veto on a bill restoring voting rights for felons on parole.

During the 2019 legislative session and following incidents involving nooses on school campuses in 2018, Chang introduced a bill that would ban the use of nooses or swastikas to "threaten or intimidate someone". The bill was reintroduced in 2020, during which it passed and became law.

== Electoral history ==
Maryland House of Delegates District 32 Republican primary election, 2006
Party	Candidate	Votes	%
Republican	Mark S. Chang	3,913	30.4
Republican	Terry R. Gilleland Jr. (incumbent)	2,927	22.7
Republican	Wayne Charles Smith	2,829	21.9
Republican	Tiger Pimentel	1,796	13.9
Republican	Robert Middleswarth	1,426	11.1

Maryland House of Delegates District 32 election, 2006
Party	Candidate	Votes	%
Democratic	Pamela Beidle	17,964	18.6
Democratic	Mary Ann Love (incumbent)	17,697	18.3
Democratic	Theodore J. Sophocleus (incumbent)	17,661	18.3
Republican	Mark S. Chang	16,569	17.1
Republican	Terry R. Gilleland Jr. (incumbent)	13,632	14.1
Republican	Wayne Charles Smith	13,153	13.6
Write-in		75	0.1

Maryland House of Delegates District 32 Democratic primary election, 2014
Party	Candidate	Votes	%
Democratic	Pamela Beidle (incumbent)	4,631	25.9
Democratic	Mark S. Chang	3,910	21.8
Democratic	Theodore J. Sophocleus (incumbent)	3,232	18.0
Democratic	Tonja McCoy	2,364	13.2
Democratic	Spencer Dove	2,357	13.2
Democratic	Steven D. Wyatt	1,420	7.9

Maryland House of Delegates District 32 election, 2014
Party	Candidate	Votes	%
Democratic	Pamela Beidle (incumbent)	17,120	20.0
Democratic	Mark S. Chang	15,904	18.6
Democratic	Theodore J. Sophocleus (incumbent)	14,995	17.5
Republican	Tim Walters	13,066	15.3
Republican	Mark Angell	12,327	14.4
Republican	Joseph Fioravante	12,012	14.0
Write-in		85	0.1

Maryland House of Delegates District 32 election, 2018
Party	Candidate	Votes	%
Democratic	Mark S. Chang (incumbent)	24,498	20.9
Democratic	J. Sandy Bartlett	24,220	20.7
Democratic	Mike Rogers	23,316	19.9
Republican	Patty Ewing	16,340	13.9
Republican	Mark E. Bailey	14,520	12.4
Republican	Tim Walters	14,158	12.1
Write-in		150	0.1

Maryland House of Delegates District 32 election, 2022
Party	Candidate	Votes	%
Democratic	Mark S. Chang (incumbent)	21,755	22.4
Democratic	J. Sandy Bartlett (incumbent)	20,988	21.6
Democratic	Mike Rogers (incumbent)	20,597	21.2
Republican	Monica L. W. Smearman	11,384	11.7
Republican	Michael Jette	11,213	11.5
Republican	Michele Speakman	11,169	11.5
Write-in		107	0.1

Maryland's 3rd congressional district Democratic primary results, 2024
Party	Candidate	Votes	%
Democratic	Sarah Elfreth	29,459	36.2
Democratic	Harry Dunn	20,380	25.0
Democratic	Clarence Lam	9,548	11.7
Democratic	Terri Hill	5,318	6.5
Democratic	Mark Chang	4,106	5.0
Democratic	Aisha Khan	2,199	2.7
Democratic	Mike Rogers	2,147	2.6
Democratic	John Morse	1,447	1.8
Democratic	Abigail Diehl	1,379	1.7
Democratic	Lindsay Donahue	1,213	1.5
Democratic	Juan Dominguez	1,205	1.3
Democratic	Michael Coburn (withdrawn)	583	0.7
Democratic	Malcolm Thomas Colombo	527	0.7
Democratic	Don Quinn	408	0.5
Democratic	Kristin Lyman Nabors	397	0.5
Democratic	Jeff Woodard	352	0.4
Democratic	Gary Schuman	286	0.4
Democratic	Mark Gosnell	221	0.3
Democratic	Jake Pretot	162	0.2
Democratic	Matt Libber	159	0.2
Democratic	Stewart Silver	78	0.1
Democratic	Danny Rupli	34	<0.1
