= J. Sandy Bartlett =

American politician (born 1966)

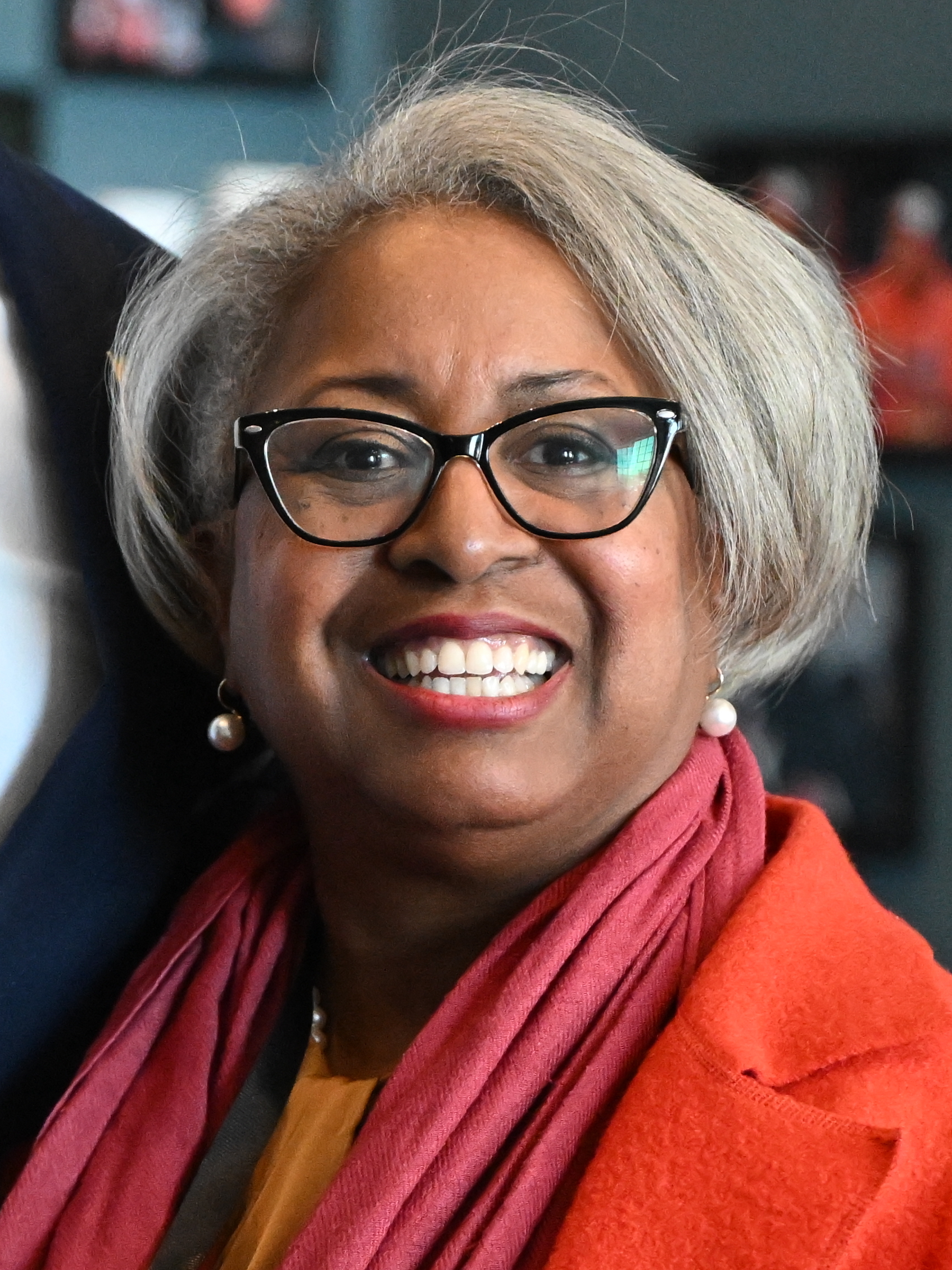
- Bartlett in 2026

Member of the Maryland House of Delegates from the 32nd district
- Incumbent
- Assumed office January 9, 2019 Serving with Mark S. Chang and Mike Rogers
- Preceded by: Pamela Beidle; Alice Sophocleus

Personal details
- Born: January 6, 1966 (age 60) Washington, D.C., U.S.
- Party: Democratic
- Children: 2
- Education: Howard University (BA); Catholic University School of Law (JD)
- Profession: Attorney
- Website: Campaign website

Juanita Sandra Bartlett (born January 6, 1966) is an American politician and lawyer who has served as a member of the Maryland House of Delegates, representing District 32 since 2019.

== Background ==
Bartlett was born in Washington, D.C. on January 6, 1966. She graduated from Howard University, where she earned a Bachelor of Arts degree in English in 1987, and attended classes at the University of San Diego and Catholic University of America before receiving her Juris Doctor degree from Catholic University in 2007. Bartlett is a member of the Alpha Kappa Alpha sorority and the NAACP.

Bartlett worked as an intellectual property attorney with various D.C.-area law firms from 2000 to 2015, afterwards starting her own law office and working as an adjunct professor for Anne Arundel Community College since 2016. She was admitted to the Maryland Bar in 2014, and the Federal Bar in 2016.

Bartlett first became involved in politics in 2006 as an alternate member of the Anne Arundel County Democratic Central Committee until 2010, when she became an elected member of the committee. In that same year, she also became a member of the West County Democratic Central Club and the District 32 Democratic Club. In August 2017, Bartlett announced that she would run for the Maryland House of Delegates in District 32. During the Democratic primary election, she ran on a slate with state delegates Mark S. Chang, Pamela Beidle, and Theodore J. Sophocleus (who was later replaced with Mike Rogers following his death). The district was targeted by the Maryland Republican Party and the Republican State Leadership Committee, who had hoped to defeat the Maryland Democratic Party's supermajority in the legislature. Bartlett won primary election in June 2018, and later defeated her Republican challengers in the general election with 20.7 percent of the vote.

== In the legislature ==
Bartlett was sworn in on January 9, 2019, and has been a member of the Judiciary Committee during her entire tenure, serving as its vice chair from 2023 to 2025 and as its chair since December 2025. She is the first African-American and first woman to chair the committee. Bartlett has also served as a deputy majority whip since 2020.

In 2020, Bartlett became the first Black woman to serve as the chair of the Anne Arundel County Delegation when she temporarily filled in for Ned Carey during a meeting earlier in the year. In December 2020, she became the first Black person elected to the position.

== Political positions ==
=== Crime and policing ===
During the 2020 legislative session, Bartlett introduced bills to automatically enroll inmates who complete their sentences into voter rolls.

In June 2020, Bartlett attended a protest against police brutality in Severn, Maryland, where she promised to introduce regulations on police use of force. During the 2021 legislative session, she introduced a bill that would prohibit school resource officers from arresting and searching a student except in situations involving "serious bodily injury". The bill passed the House, but died in the Senate.

In June 2021, she attended an NAACP protest in Annapolis after a video showing Ocean City police officers violently arrest five Black teenagers for vaping on the boardwalk surfaced on social media.

During the 2022 legislative session, Bartlett introduced the Child Interrogation Act, which prevented police from interrogating underage defendants without first allowing them to consult with an attorney. The bill passed and became law. She also supported the Juvenile Justice Reform Act, which restricted the state's ability to charge children younger than thirteen for most offenses.

During the 2026 legislative session, Bartlett supported proposals to restrict housing of children charged as adults inside adult jails and to raise the minimum age to automatically charge minors as adults.

=== Education ===
During the 2020 legislative session, Bartlett supported a bill to create a pilot program in elementary and middle schools to hire social workers to monitor students with behavioral, social, or legal difficulties.

=== Gun policy ===
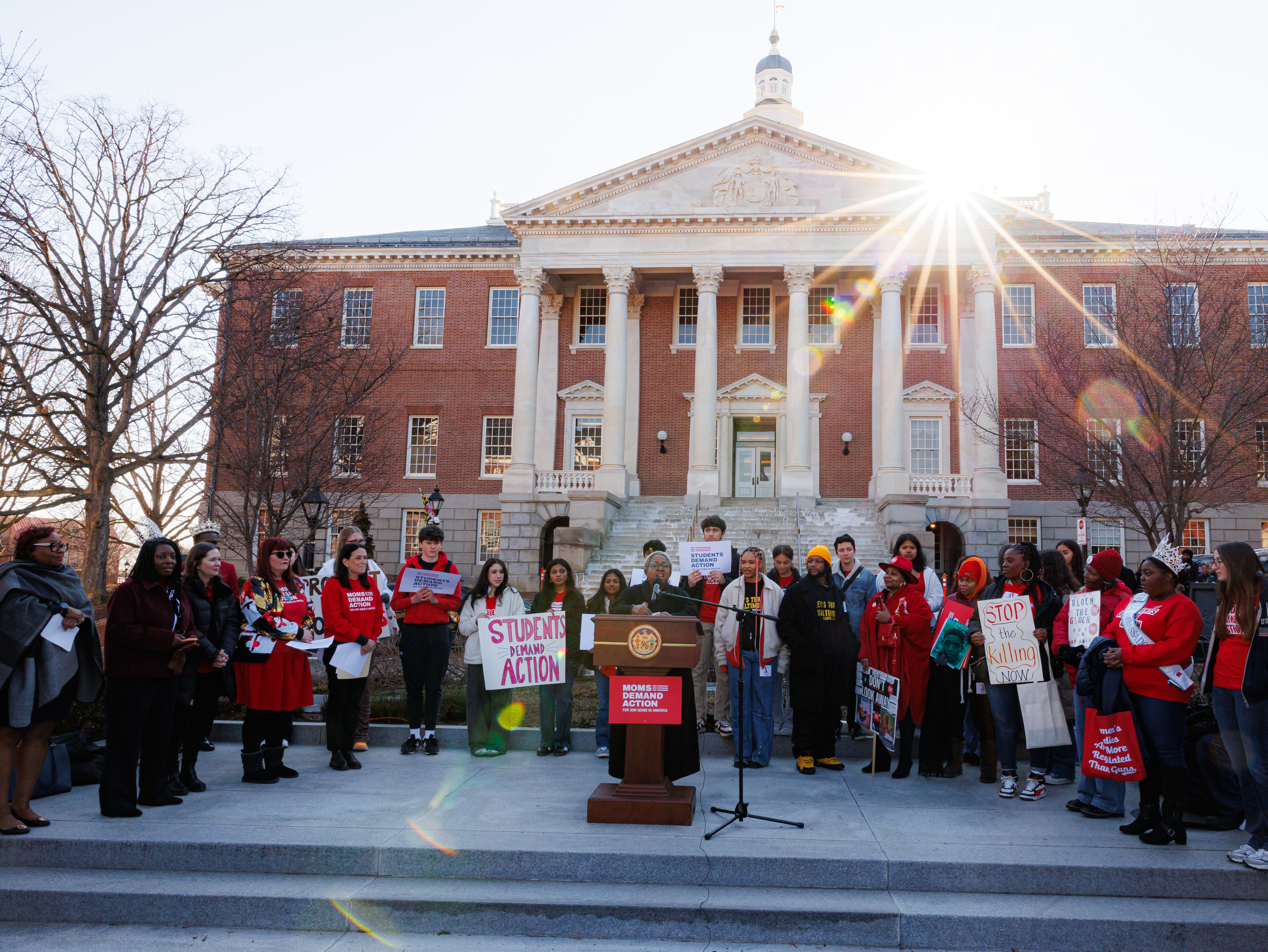
Bartlett speaks at a Moms Demand Action rally in Annapolis, 2025

During the 2023 legislative session, Bartlett introduced Jaelynn's Law, which would require guns to be safely stored and inaccessible for children below the age of 18. The bill passed and was signed into law by Governor Wes Moore. In May 2023, she condemned a Severn man who gained national attention for protesting against gun control bills the legislature passed that year by carrying a semi-automatic rifle through his neighborhood, adding that she would look at introducing a bill in 2024 to prevent people from doing this.

=== Immigration ===
During the 2026 legislative session, Bartlett supported legislation to ban counties from entering into 287(g) program agreements with U.S. Immigration and Customs Enforcement (ICE), saying that ICE "does not need our law enforcement to their job".

=== National politics ===
Bartlett condemned the January 6 United States Capitol attack as an "attempt at sedition" and expressed solidarity with congressional lawmakers and workers.

=== Social issues ===
In 2019, Bartlett voted for a bill to allow palliative care for terminally ill patients.

During the 2020 legislative session, Bartlett supported the CROWN Act, which prohibits discrimination on the basis of hair style and texture. The bill passed and became law. She also introduced a bill to ban "Request to Suspend Investigation" waiver forms in sexual assault cases.

In July 2020, Bartlett signed onto a letter calling on regional news organizations to increase employee diversity.

During the 2023 legislative session, Bartlett introduced a bill to prohibit police from arresting and charging child victims of trafficking. The bill passed and became law.

In November 2025, Bartlett supported a bill to ban 287(g) program agreements in Maryland, saying that she opposes policies that separate families.

=== Taxes ===
During the 2021 legislative session, Bartlett introduced a bill that would allow the Anne Arundel County Council to impose real estate transfer taxes on properties worth over $1 million. The bill passed the legislature, but was vetoed by Governor Larry Hogan. The legislature overrode Hogan's veto on the bill during the 2021 special legislative session.

== Personal life ==
Bartlett lives in Maryland City, Maryland. She is married and has two children. She is Christian.

In March 2019, Bartlett revealed that she had potentially terminal breast cancer and had a double mastectomy to remove it.

In February 2025, during debate on a bill that would require public schools to teach age-appropriate health education that included sexual orientation, family, and gender identity courses, Bartlett revealed that she was a sexual assault survivor and had been molested as a child and that having such classes as a child "would have made all the difference in my life".

== Electoral history ==
Anne Arundel County Democratic Central Committee District 32 election, 2014
Party	Candidate	Votes	%
Democratic	Andrea Muriel Jones-Horton	4,291	27.9
Democratic	Kathleen Anne Shatt	4,180	27.2
Democratic	J. Sandy Bartlett	4,156	27.0
Democratic	Tryphenia A. Ellis-Johnson	2,761	17.9

Maryland House of Delegates District 32 Democratic primary election, 2018
Party	Candidate	Votes	%
Democratic	Mark S. Chang (incumbent)	4,591	22.3
Democratic	J. Sandy Bartlett	4,200	20.4
Democratic	Mike Rogers	3,795	18.4
Democratic	Jenese Jones	2,639	12.8
Democratic	Patrick Armstrong	1,939	9.4
Democratic	Theodore J. Sophocleus (incumbent) †	1,863	9.0
Democratic	Derek Kent	1,583	7.7

Maryland House of Delegates District 32 election, 2018
Party	Candidate	Votes	%
Democratic	Mark S. Chang (incumbent)	24,498	20.9
Democratic	J. Sandy Bartlett	24,220	20.7
Democratic	Mike Rogers	23,316	19.9
Republican	Patty Ewing	16,340	13.9
Republican	Mark E. Bailey	14,520	12.4
Republican	Tim Walters	14,158	12.1
Write-in		150	0.1

Maryland House of Delegates District 32 election, 2022
Party	Candidate	Votes	%
Democratic	Mark S. Chang (incumbent)	21,755	22.4
Democratic	J. Sandy Bartlett (incumbent)	20,988	21.6
Democratic	Mike Rogers (incumbent)	20,597	21.2
Republican	Monica L. W. Smearman	11,384	11.7
Republican	Michael Jette	11,213	11.5
Republican	Michele Speakman	11,169	11.5
Write-in		107	0.1
