= Maryland Legislative District 32 =

American legislative district

Maryland's legislative district 32
- Represents part of Anne Arundel County
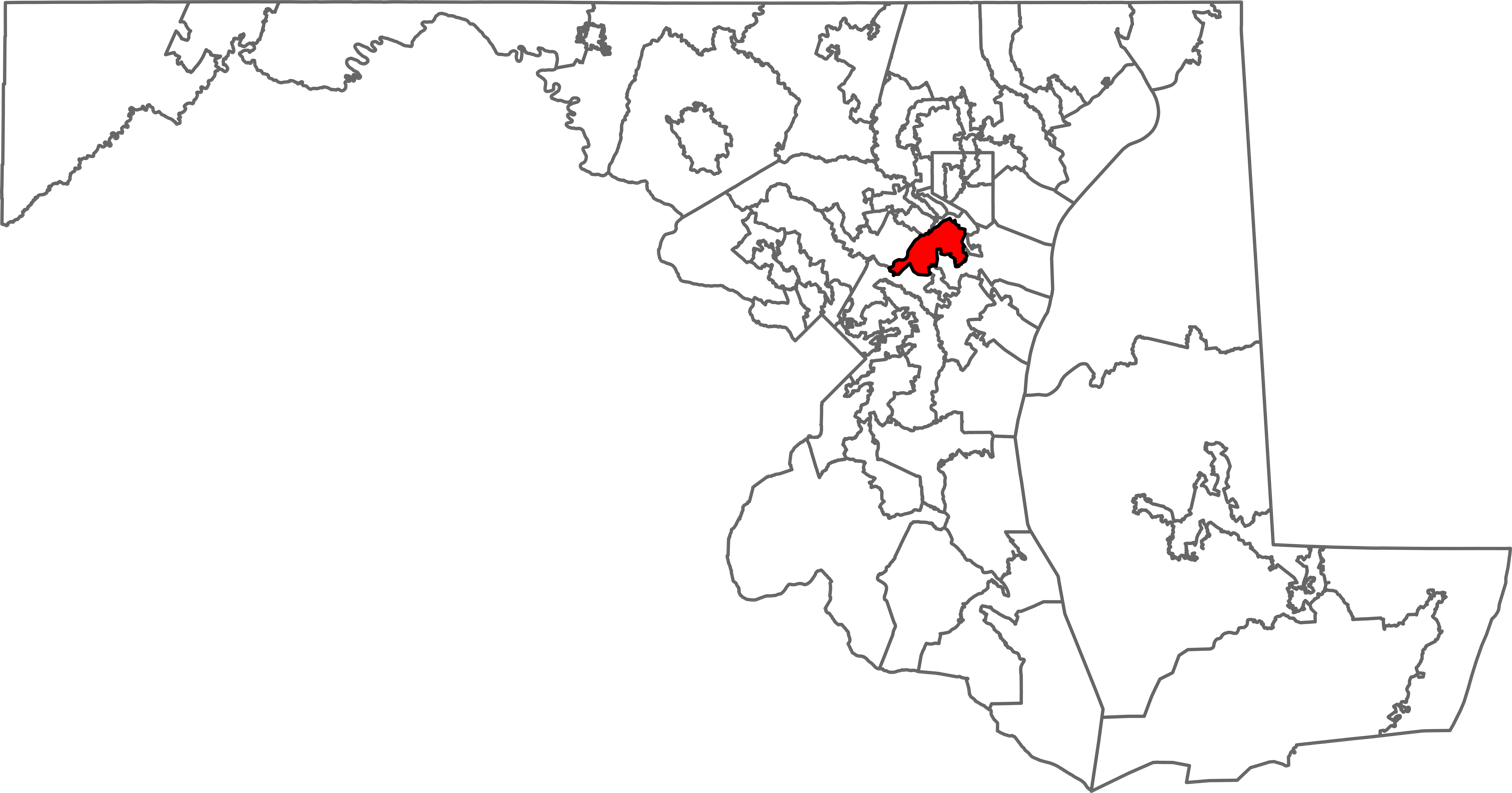
- Senator: Pamela G. Beidle (D)
- Delegate(s): J. Sandy Bartlett (D); Mark S. Chang (D); Michael J. Rogers (D)
- Registration: 53.0% Democratic; 23.3% Republican; 22.3% unaffiliated
- Demographics: 43.0% White; 34.1% Black/African American; 0.5% Native American; 6.7% Asian; 0.1% Hawaiian/Pacific Islander; 6.4% Other race; 9.2% Two or more races; 12.1% Hispanic
- Population (2020): 152,843
- Voting-age population: 118,486
- Registered voters: 91,262

Maryland Legislative District 32 is one of 47 districts in the state for the Maryland General Assembly. It covers part of Anne Arundel County. The district is represented by three delegates in the Maryland House of Delegates.

== Demographic characteristics ==
As of the 2020 United States census, the district had a population of 152,843, of whom 118,486 (77.5%) were of voting age. The racial makeup of the district was 65,717 (43.0%) White, 52,142 (34.1%) African American, 726 (0.5%) Native American, 10,285 (6.7%) Asian, 87 (0.1%) Pacific Islander, 9,747 (6.4%) from some other race, and 14,029 (9.2%) from two or more races. Hispanic or Latino of any race were 18,534 (12.1%) of the population.

The district had 91,262 registered voters as of October 17, 2020, of whom 20,376 (22.3%) were registered as unaffiliated, 21,233 (23.3%) were registered as Republicans, 48,365 (53.0%) were registered as Democrats, and 657 (0.7%) were registered to other parties.

== Political representation ==
The district is represented for the 2023–2027 legislative term in the State Senate by Pamela G. Beidle (D) and in the House of Delegates by J. Sandy Bartlett (D), Mark S. Chang (D) and Michael J. Rogers (D).
