= Pat Young =

American politician (born 1983)

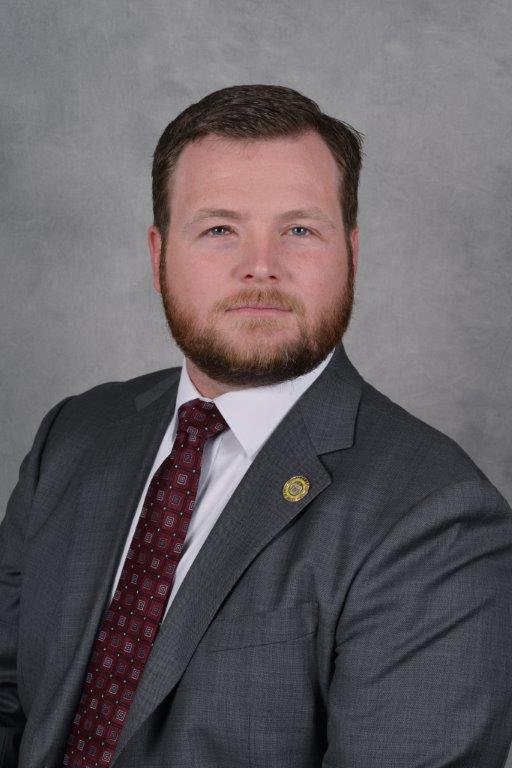
- Official portrait, 2015

Member of the Baltimore County Council from the 1st district
- Incumbent
- Assumed office December 5, 2022
- Preceded by: Tom Quirk

Member of the Maryland House of Delegates from the 44B district
- In office January 14, 2015 – December 5, 2022 Serving with Sheila Ruth
- Preceded by: Keiffer Mitchell Jr.
- Succeeded by: Aletheia McCaskill

Personal details
- Born: April 20, 1983 (age 43) Catonsville, Maryland, U.S.
- Party: Democratic
- Children: 2
- Education: Towson University
- Website: Campaign website

Military service
- Allegiance: United States
- Branch/service: U.S. Marine Corps
- Years of service: 2001–2005
- Rank: Sergeant
- Unit: 1st Battalion, 8th Marines
- Battles/wars: Iraq War; Second Battle of Fallujah
- Young's voice Young speaks to members of the Baltimore County Board of Education. Recorded May 6, 2025

Patrick G. Young Jr. (born April 20, 1983) is an American politician who has served a member of the Baltimore County Council representing the first district since 2022. A member of the Democratic Party, he was a member of the Maryland House of Delegates in District 44B from 2015 to 2022.

== Early life and career ==
Young was born in Catonsville, Maryland, and grew up in Woodbridge Valley. He was a member of the Boy Scouts of America Troop 140 and graduated from Mount Saint Joseph High School in 2001, afterwards enlisting in the U.S. Marine Corps Infantry (1st Battalion, 8th Marine Regiment) and serving through two combat tours in Iraq as well as a humanitarian mission to Liberia. Young fought in the Second Battle of Fallujah, during which his unit lost 21 men, including his two best friends, but received a combat promotion for actions rendered during the battle in November 2004.

After returning home, Young attended Towson University on the GI Bill, where he founded the Student Veterans Group of Towson and earned three bachelor's degrees (political science, religious studies, and philosophy). In 2010, he was hired by Towson as the coordinator of veterans services. In 2011, Young was appointed by Governor Martin O'Malley to the Maryland Veterans Commission.

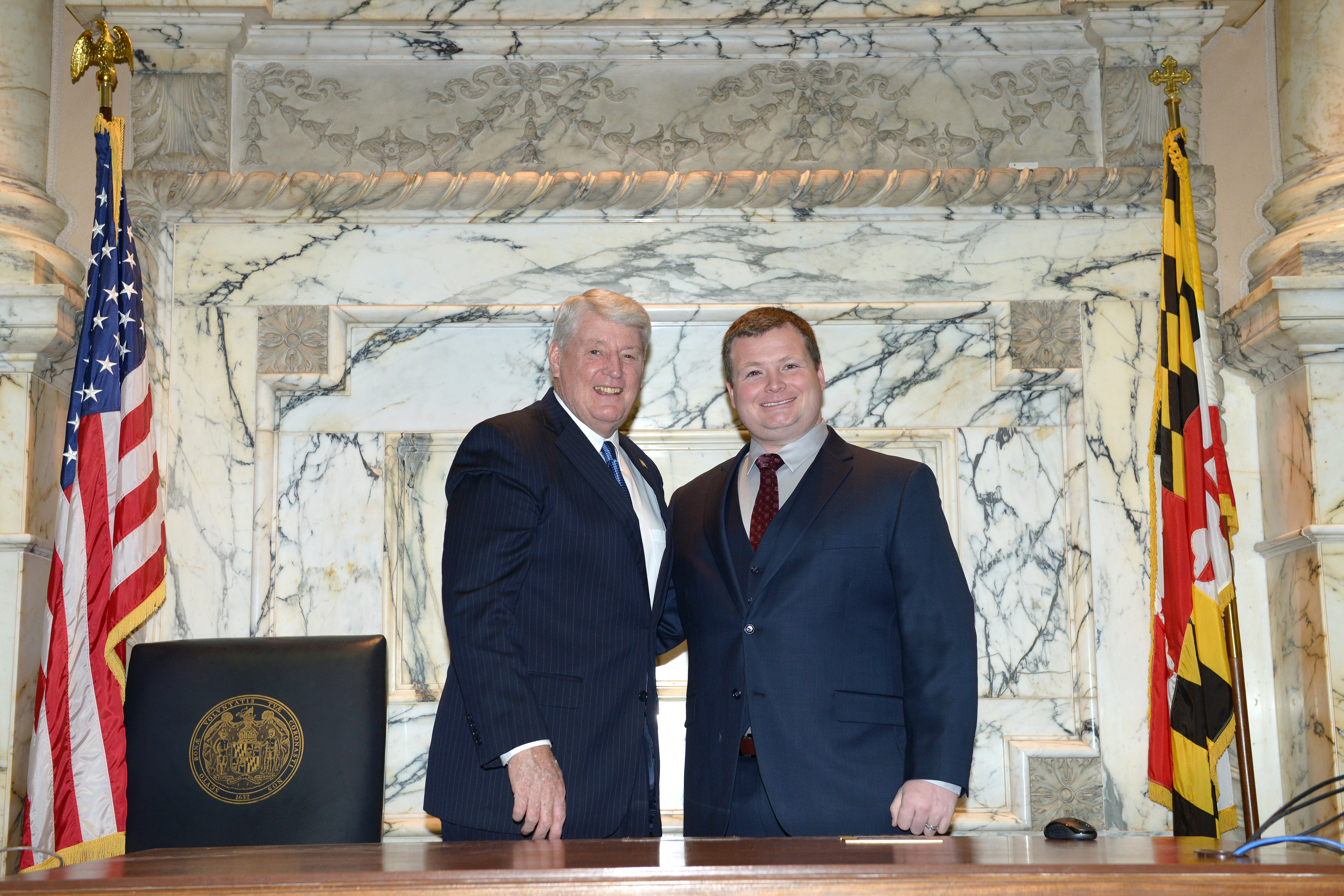
House Speaker Michael E. Busch with Young, 2015

== Maryland House of Delegates ==
In May 2013, Young announced he would run for the Maryland House of Delegates in District 44B, seeking to succeed state delegate Shirley Nathan-Pulliam, who announced a run for Maryland Senate in 2014. He won the Democratic primary with 22.9 percent of the vote, edging out his opponent by 34 votes and coming in second place behind incumbent state delegate Charles E. Sydnor III. Young and Sydnor defeated Republican Michael Russell in the general election.

Young was sworn into the Maryland House of Delegates on January 14, 2015. He was a member of the Appropriations Committee during his entire tenure, including as the chair of the personnel oversight subcommittee from 2019 to 2022. From December 2018 to 2022, he served as the chair of the Baltimore County Delegation.

== Baltimore County Council ==
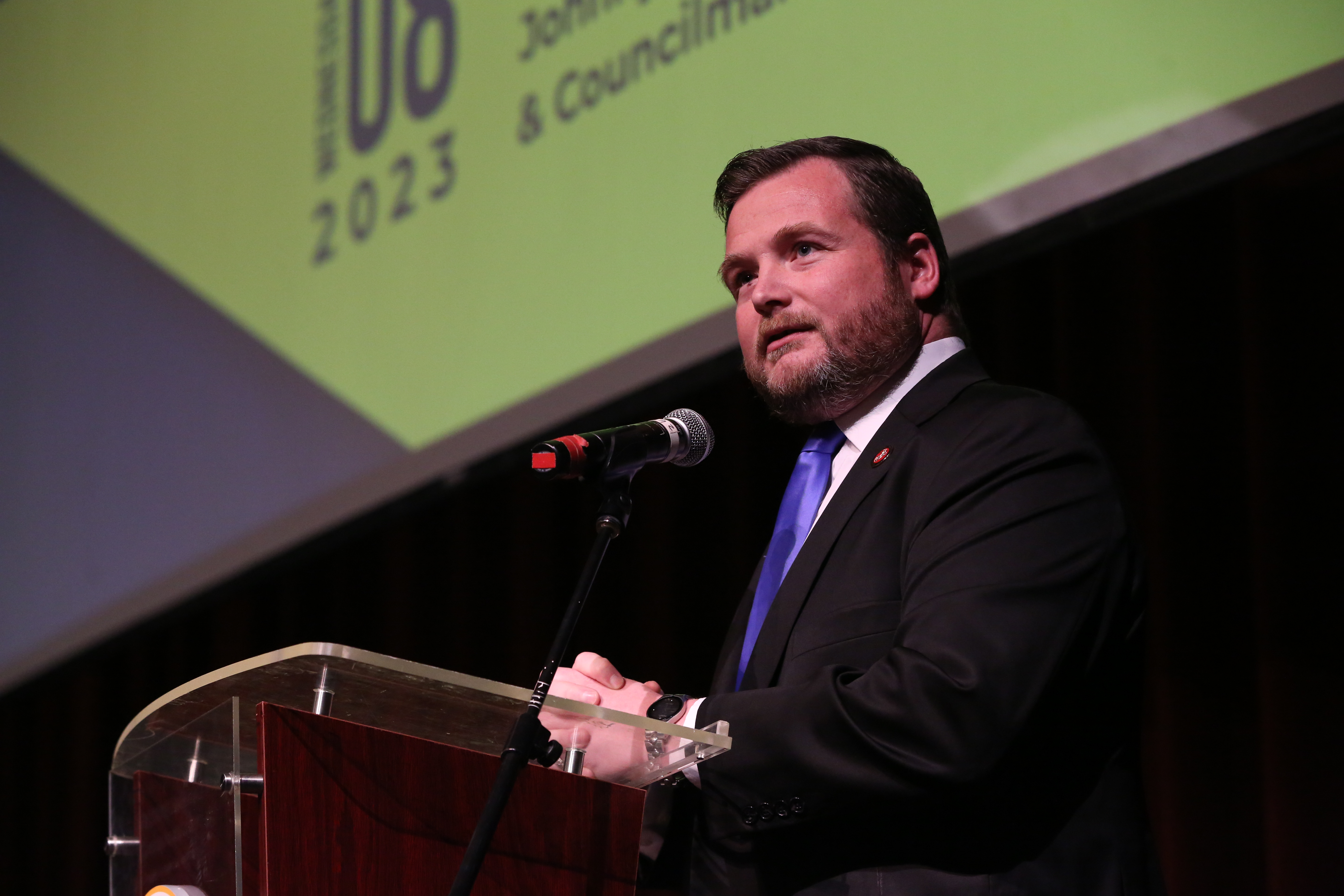
Young speaking at a town hall, 2023

In May 2021, Young announced that he would not seek re-election to the House of Delegates in 2022, instead opting to run for the Baltimore County Council, seeking the seat held by outgoing councilmember Tom Quirk. In March 2022, he was endorsed by county executive Johnny Olszewski. Young won the Democratic primary with 43.8 percent of the vote, and later won the general election on November 8, 2022, with 63.4 percent of the vote over his opponent.

Young was sworn in on December 5, 2022. On the county council, Young gained a reputation as a stickler for law and order, policy, and procedure, pushing for county council meetings to be posted a few days in advance and for his colleagues to submit amendments to bills a few days before hearings so that everyone could review their proposals. In August 2025, he voted for Baltimore County Executive Kathy Klausmeier's nomination of Khadija Walker as the county's Inspector General, despite previously voicing support for incumbent Kelly Madigan and expressing concerns with the process used to select Walker as Inspector General.

On February 27, 2025, Young announced that he would run for Baltimore County Executive in 2026, seeking to succeed Klausmeier, who pledged not to run for re-election after being appointed county executive in January 2025. Young was defeated in the Democratic primary election on June 23, 2026, placing fourth.

== Political positions ==
During his 2014 House of Delegates campaign, Young said he supported using eminent domain to take ownership of vacant properties.

During the 2015 legislative session, Young introduced a bill that would provide dependents of military veterans access to in-state tuition rates at Maryland colleges and universities.

In November 2019, Young endorsed South Bend mayor Pete Buttigieg for president. In January 2020, Young filed to run for delegate to the Democratic National Convention, pledged to Buttigieg.

In August 2020, Young joined a demonstration in front of the home of U.S. postmaster general Louis DeJoy, which was organized amid allegations that DeJoy was limiting mail-in voting ahead of the 2020 United States presidential election. In December 2020, Young joined ShutDown DC organizers in defending Black Lives Matter Plaza from the Proud Boys, a neo-fascist and white supremacist organization that tried to make their way past police lines and into the plaza throughout the day.

During the 2021 legislative session, Young introduced a bill that would establish an Office on Climate Change within the governor's office, which would be tasked with implementing the recommendations of the Maryland Commission on Climate Change.

During the 2022 legislative session and following a cyberattack against the Maryland Department of Health, Young introduced legislation that would offer increased protections to state and local government online networks. All three bills passed and were signed into law by Governor Larry Hogan on May 12, 2022.

== Personal life ==
Young is married and has two sons.

== Electoral history ==
Maryland House of Delegates District 44B Democratic primary election, 2014
Party	Candidate	Votes	%
Democratic	Charles E. Sydnor III	3,849	23.4
Democratic	Pat Young	3,763	22.9
Democratic	Aaron J. Barnett	3,729	22.7
Democratic	Rainier Harvey	2,936	17.9
Democratic	Bishop Barry Chapman	1,605	9.8
Democratic	Frederick D. Ware-Newsome	535	3.3

Maryland House of Delegates District 44B election, 2014
Party	Candidate	Votes	%
Democratic	Charles E. Sydnor, III	16,314	41.8
Democratic	Pat Young	16,013	41.0
Republican	Michael J. Russell	6,622	17.0
Write-in		109	0.2

Maryland House of Delegates District 44B election, 2018
Party	Candidate	Votes	%
Democratic	Pat Young	24,226	55.4
Democratic	Charles E. Sydnor, III	19,082	43.6
Write-in		418	1.0

Baltimore County Council District 1 Democratic primary election, 2022
Party	Candidate	Votes	%
Democratic	Pat Young	5,734	43.8
Democratic	Paul Dongarra	4,957	37.9
Democratic	Danielle Nicole Singley	2,398	18.3

Baltimore County Council District 1 election, 2022
Party	Candidate	Votes	%
Democratic	Pat Young	23,525	67.8
Republican	Albert Nalley	11,138	32.1
Write-in		59	0.2

Baltimore County Executive Democratic primary election, 2026
Party	Candidate	Votes	%
Democratic	Julian Jones	33,505	38.1
Democratic	Izzy Patoka	26,469	30.1
Democratic	Nick Stewart	16,067	18.3
Democratic	Pat Young	8,242	9.4
Democratic	Mansoor Shams	3,751	4.3
Total votes		88,034	100.0
