= Charles E. Sydnor III =

American politician (born 1974)

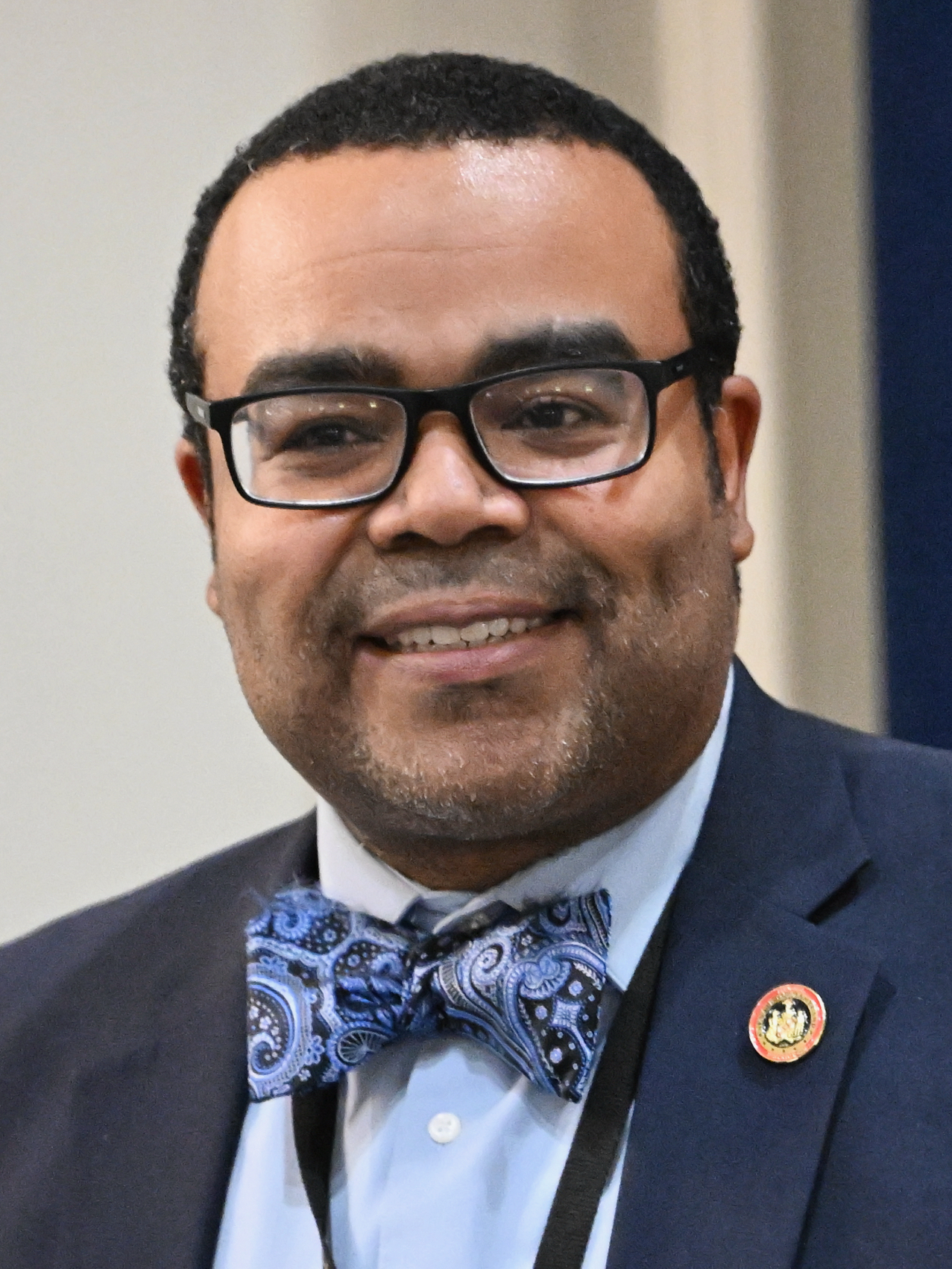
- Sydnor in 2024

Member of the Maryland Senate from the 44th district
- Incumbent
- Assumed office January 8, 2020
- Appointed by: Larry Hogan
- Preceded by: Shirley Nathan-Pulliam

Member of the Maryland House of Delegates from the 44B district
- In office January 14, 2015 – January 8, 2020 Serving with Pat Young
- Preceded by: Shirley Nathan-Pulliam
- Succeeded by: Sheila Ruth

Personal details
- Born: March 18, 1974 (age 52) Baltimore, Maryland, U.S.
- Party: Democratic
- Children: 3
- Education: Baltimore Polytechnic Institute
- Alma mater: Johns Hopkins University (BA); University of Maryland Baltimore County (MA); University of Maryland (JD)
- Occupation: Attorney

Charles E. Sydnor III (born March 18, 1974) is an American politician who has served as a member of the Maryland Senate representing District 44 since 2020. A member of the Democratic Party, he previously represented District 44B in the Maryland House of Delegates from 2015 to 2020.

== Early life and education ==
Sydnor was born in Baltimore on March 18, 1974, and was raised in its West Hills community. He graduated from the Baltimore Polytechnic Institute and attended Johns Hopkins University, where he earned a Bachelor of Arts degree in history in 1996; the University of Maryland, Baltimore County, where he earned a Master of Arts degree in policy science in 2000; and the University of Maryland Francis King Carey School of Law, where he earned a Juris Doctor degree in 2002. Sydnor is a member of the Omicron Delta Kappa fraternity.

== Career ==
=== Early career ===
Sydnor was a college intern to Baltimore City Circuit Court Judge William D. Quarles Jr., and was admitted to the Maryland Bar and District of Columbia Bar after graduating. He has worked as an attorney for Enterprise Community Partners since 2001, and worked as a consumer council for the Attorney General of Maryland from 2010 to 2012.

From 2007 to 2013, Sydnor served on the Citizen's Advisory Committees of the Chesapeake Executive Council and the Baltimore Corridor Transit Study for the Red Line.

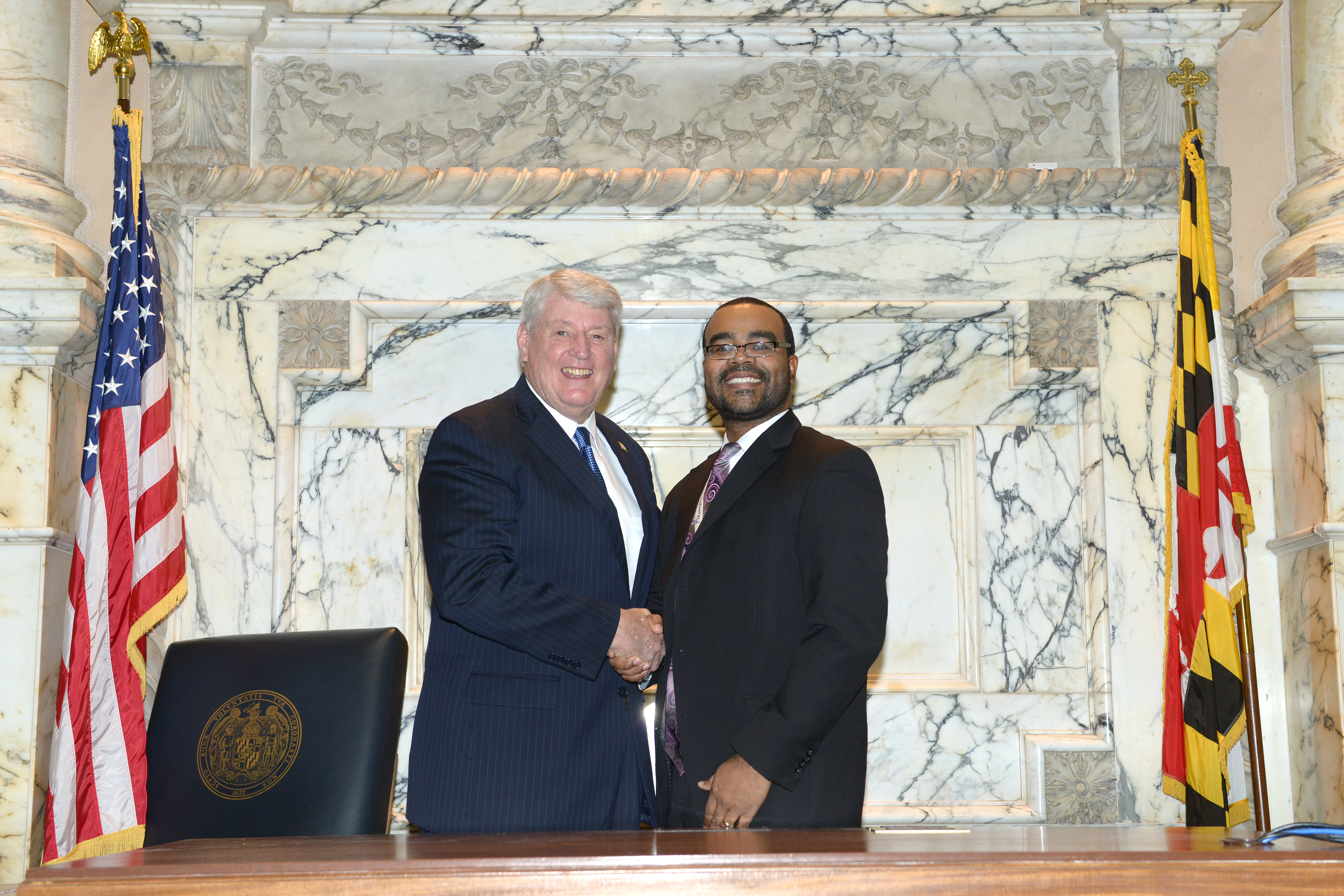
House Speaker Michael E. Busch swears Sydnor into the Maryland House of Delegates, 2015

=== Maryland General Assembly ===
On July 12, 2013, Sydnor said that he would run for the Maryland House of Delegates in 2014, seeking to succeed state Delegate Shirley Nathan-Pulliam, who ran for the Maryland Senate and with whom he ran on a slate. He won the Democratic primary with 23.4 percent of the vote on June 24, 2014, and later won the general election alongside Pat Young in November 2014.

Sydnor was sworn into the Maryland House of Delegates on January 13, 2015. During his tenure, he served as a member of the Judiciary Committee and chaired its civil law & procedure and criminal justice subcommittees.

In December 2019, following the resignation of state Senator Shirley Nathan-Pulliam, Sydnor applied to serve the remainder of her term in the Maryland Senate. The Baltimore County Democratic Central Committee voted to nominate Sydnor to the seat, while the Baltimore City Democratic Central Committee voted to nominate state Delegate Keith E. Haynes to the seat. Governor Larry Hogan appointed Sydnor to the seat on December 30, 2019, and he was sworn in on January 8, 2020. He has served as a member of the Judicial Proceedings Committee during his entire tenure. Sydnor was elected to a full four-year term in 2022.

In October 2024, Sydnor expressed interest in running for Baltimore County Executive in 2026. He ultimately decided against running, announcing in June 2025 that he would instead run for re-election.

== Political positions ==
=== Crime and policing ===
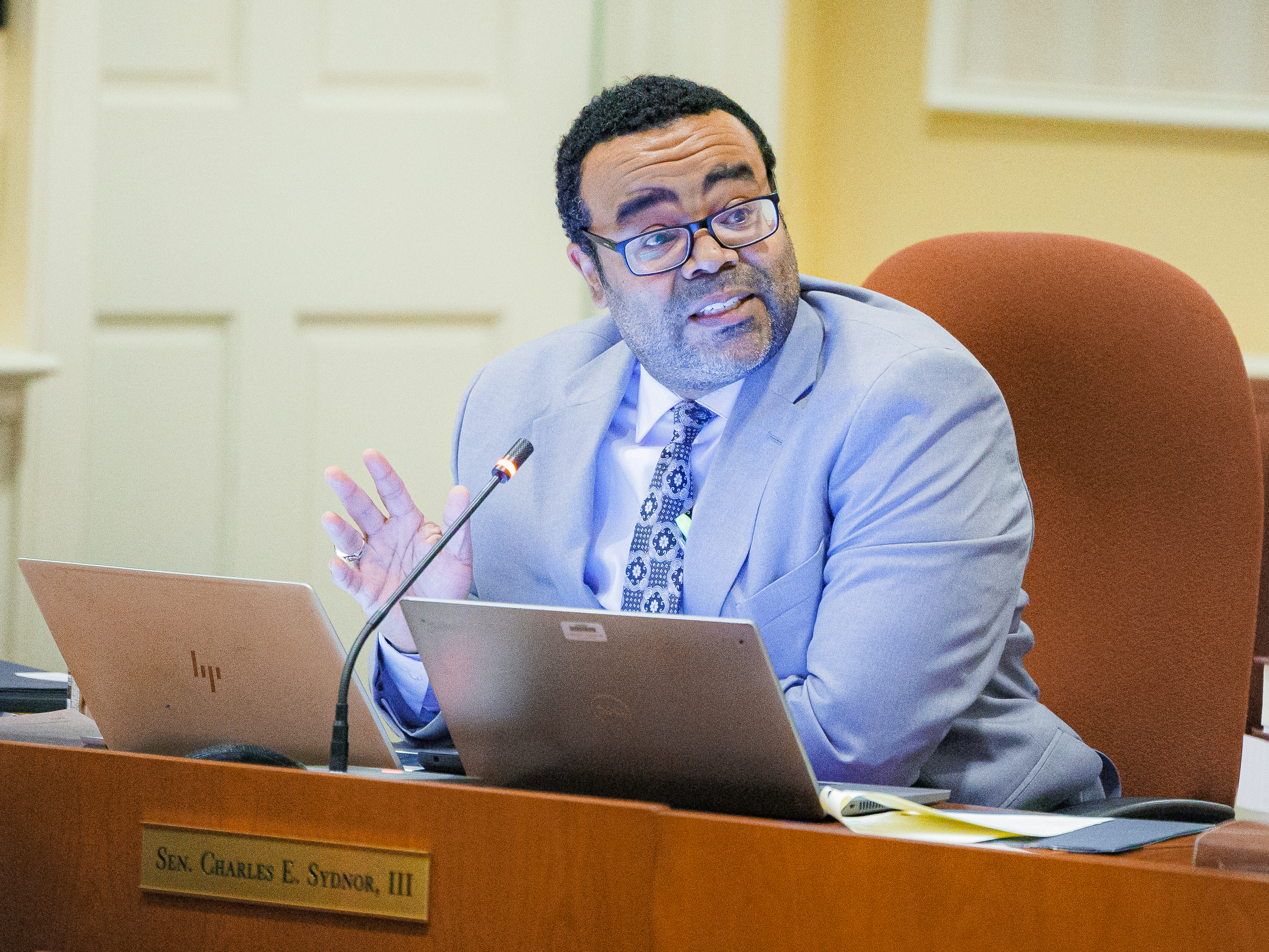
Sydnor in the Senate Judicial Proceedings Committee, 2025

During the 2015 legislative session, Sydnor introduced legislation to create a separate mental health unit within the Baltimore Police Department.

In 2016, Sydnor introduced a bill that would require police to obtain a warrant to use a stingray phone tracker, which can locate a cellphone's user within six feet. The bill died in committee.

During the 2019 legislative session, after a suspect was arrested in the Golden State Killer murders by police who used consumer genealogical databases to identify him, Sydnor introduced a bill to prohibit police access to such databases to identify criminal suspects through DNA samples submitted by relatives. The bill was reintroduced in 2021, during which it passed and became law. Sydnor also introduced legislation to conceal the identities of juveniles charged as adults.

In 2021, Sydnor said he supported legislation to return control of the Baltimore Police Department back to the city of Baltimore and the Police Reform and Accountability Act, an omnibus police reform bill to repeal the Law Enforcement Officers' Bill of Rights and regulate the types of force that police could use during arrests, and introduced a bill that would require on-duty officers to wear body cameras by 2025, which passed and became law. He also voted against a bill to create criminal penalties for police officers who intentionally use excessive force, saying that he felt unsatisfied with the bill's definition of excessive force, and criticized other police reform bills passed by the legislature for "not going far enough".

During the 2026 legislative session, Sydnor supported a bill to ban law enforcement officers from wearing face coverings, citing the tactics of U.S. Immigration and Customs Enforcement (ICE), which he called "an agency that does not abide by constitutional norms nor law enforcement norms".

=== Education ===
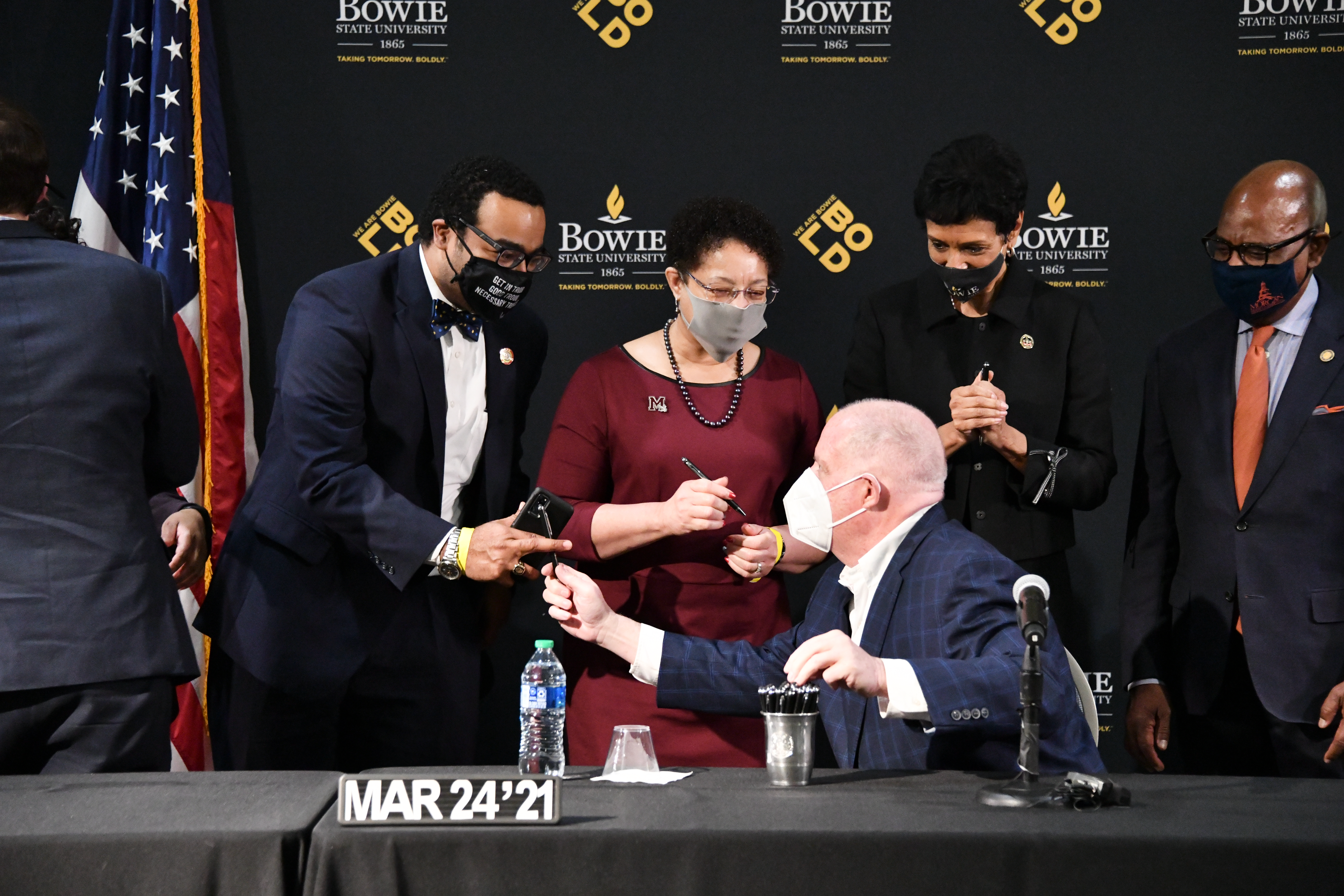
Sydnor at the HBCU lawsuit settlement bill signing, 2021

In May 2019, Sydnor condemned social media comments made by state Delegate Robin Grammer Jr. toward members of the Baltimore County Board of Education that contained racially-charged language.

During the 2020 legislative session, Sydnor introduced legislation that would force the state to settle its 13-year-old lawsuit against its historically black colleges and universities (HBCUs) by annually distributing $57.7 million to the state's HCBUs over a decade. The bill passed, but was vetoed by Governor Hogan. The bill was reintroduced in 2021, during which it passed and was signed into law by Governor Larry Hogan.

In 2021, Sydnor introduced legislation to add an appointed member of the Baltimore County Board of Education.

=== Electoral reform ===
In October 2021, Sydnor attended a protest against the Baltimore County Council's proposed redistricting plan, saying that the newly drawn districts would not adequately represent the county's population and packed Black voters into a single district. He later led a lawsuit against the county's redistricting plan, which resulted in a new map that included a majority-Black district and a plurality-white district. During the 2022 legislative session, Sydnor introduced legislation that would allow the Maryland attorney general to intervene when local governments violate federal voting laws.

In October 2025, amid efforts to redraw Maryland's congressional districts in response to Republican efforts to redraw congressional maps in various red states, Sydnor said that he would "guarantee" that any map redrawn to have eight Democratic seats in Maryland would be challenged in court, saying that just because a state can decrease the representation afforded to racial or political minorities "doesn't make it right". He also criticized Texas Republicans for redrawing their congressional districts to create five new Republican seats.

During the 2026 legislative session, Sydnor introduced a bill that would ban minority voter suppression and dilution in local and county elections. The bill passed and was signed into law by Governor Wes Moore. In April 2026, Sydnor criticized the U.S. Supreme Court's ruling in Louisiana v. Callais, saying that while the ruling was a "gut punch", it was not unexpected because "the court has been hostile to the Voting Rights Act for some time".

=== Environment ===
During the 2023 legislative session, Sydnor supported legislation to look into creating a new governance structure to oversee water and wastewater systems in the Baltimore and Baltimore County. The bill passed and was signed into law by Governor Wes Moore.

=== Healthcare ===
During the 2019 legislative session, Sydnor voted against the End-of-Life Option Act, which would have provided palliative care to terminally ill adults.

=== Immigration ===
During the 2026 legislative session, Sydnor supported a bill to prohibit counties from entering into 287(g) program agreements with ICE, saying there was an urgent need to act due to documentation of ICE agents in other states forcibly entering homes without a judicial warrant.

=== Social issues ===
In August 2015, Sydnor called for the resignation of Maryland Housing Secretary Kenneth Holt after Holt claimed without evidence that parents were deliberately exposing their children to lead paint to get free housing.

During the 2026 legislative session, Sydnor introduced a bill that would restrict the release of divorce records under the Maryland Public Information Act. The bill passed, but was vetoed by Governor Moore in May 2026.

=== Transportation ===
Sydnor supports the Red Line.

== Personal life ==
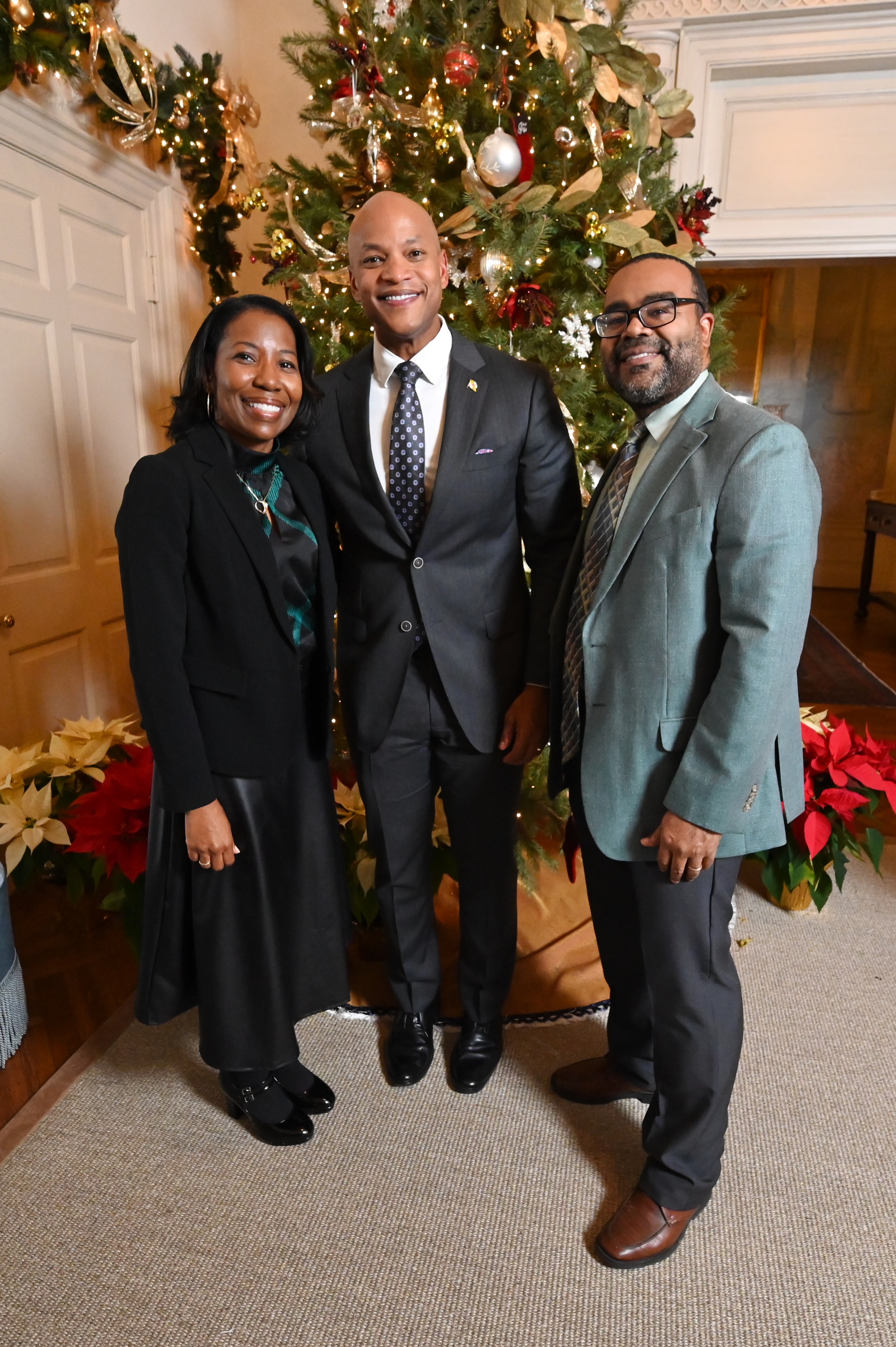
Sydnor with his wife and Governor Wes Moore, 2024

Sydnor is married and has three daughters. He lives in Catonsville, Maryland.

== Electoral history ==
Maryland House of Delegates District 44B Democratic primary election, 2014
Party	Candidate	Votes	%
Democratic	Charles E. Sydnor III	3,849	23.4
Democratic	Pat Young	3,763	22.9
Democratic	Aaron J. Barnett	3,729	22.7
Democratic	Rainier Harvey	2,936	17.9
Democratic	Bishop Barry Chapman	1,605	9.8
Democratic	Frederick D. Ware-Newsome	535	3.3

Maryland House of Delegates District 44B election, 2014
Party	Candidate	Votes	%
Democratic	Charles E. Sydnor III	16,314	41.8
Democratic	Pat Young	16,013	41.0
Republican	Michael J. Russell	6,622	17.0
Write-in		109	0.2

Maryland House of Delegates District 44B election, 2018
Party	Candidate	Votes	%
Democratic	Pat Young (incumbent)	24,226	55.4
Democratic	Charles E. Sydnor, III (incumbent)	19,082	43.6
Write-in		418	1.0

Maryland Senate District 44 Democratic primary election, 2022
Party	Candidate	Votes	%
Democratic	Charles E. Sydnor, III (incumbent)	12,938	82.6
Democratic	Ilyas Chohan	2,718	17.4

Maryland Senate District 44 election, 2022
Party	Candidate	Votes	%
Democratic	Charles E. Sydnor, III (incumbent)	30,699	97.5
Write-in		792	2.5
