= Laura Herrera Scott =

Maryland politician

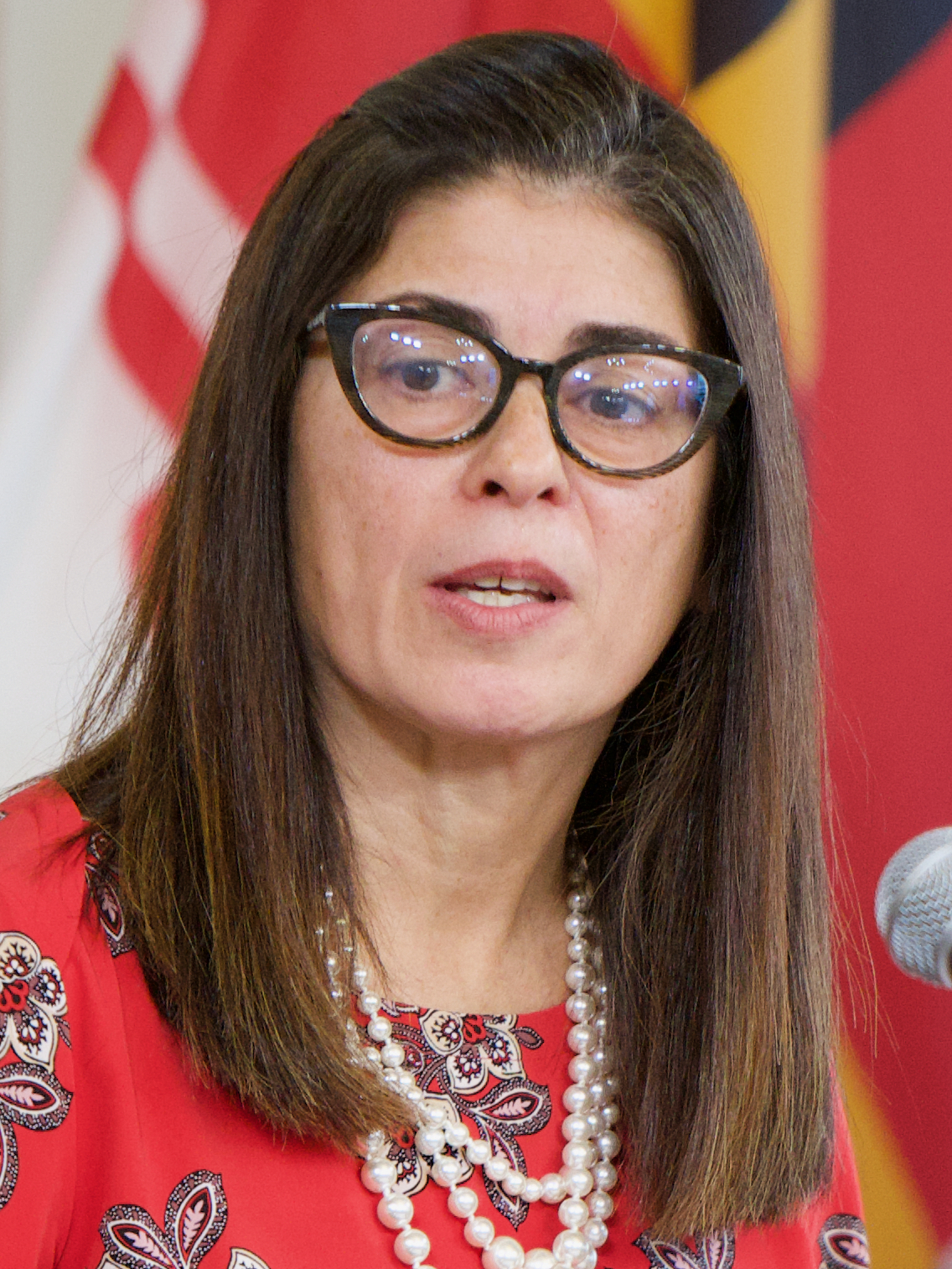
- Scott in 2023

Secretary of the Maryland Department of Health
- In office March 2, 2023 – February 28, 2025
- Governor: Wes Moore
- Preceded by: Dennis R. Schrader
- Succeeded by: Meena Seshamani

Personal details
- Children: 2
- Education: Baruch College (BA); SUNY Downstate Health Sciences University (MD); Johns Hopkins University (MPH)
- Occupation: Physician

Laura Herrera Scott is an American politician and physician who served as the Secretary of Health for the U.S. state of Maryland from 2023 to 2025.

== Education ==
Scott received a Bachelor of Arts degree in business administration from Baruch College, a medical degree from SUNY Downstate Health Sciences University and a master's degree from Johns Hopkins Bloomberg School of Public Health.

== Career ==
Scott worked as the chief medical officer at the Baltimore City Health Department. She was vice president at Anthem Blue Cross and Blue Shield and later, medical director of population and community health at Johns Hopkins Healthcare.

Scott served as deputy secretary of public health under Maryland's former Governor, Martin O'Malley.

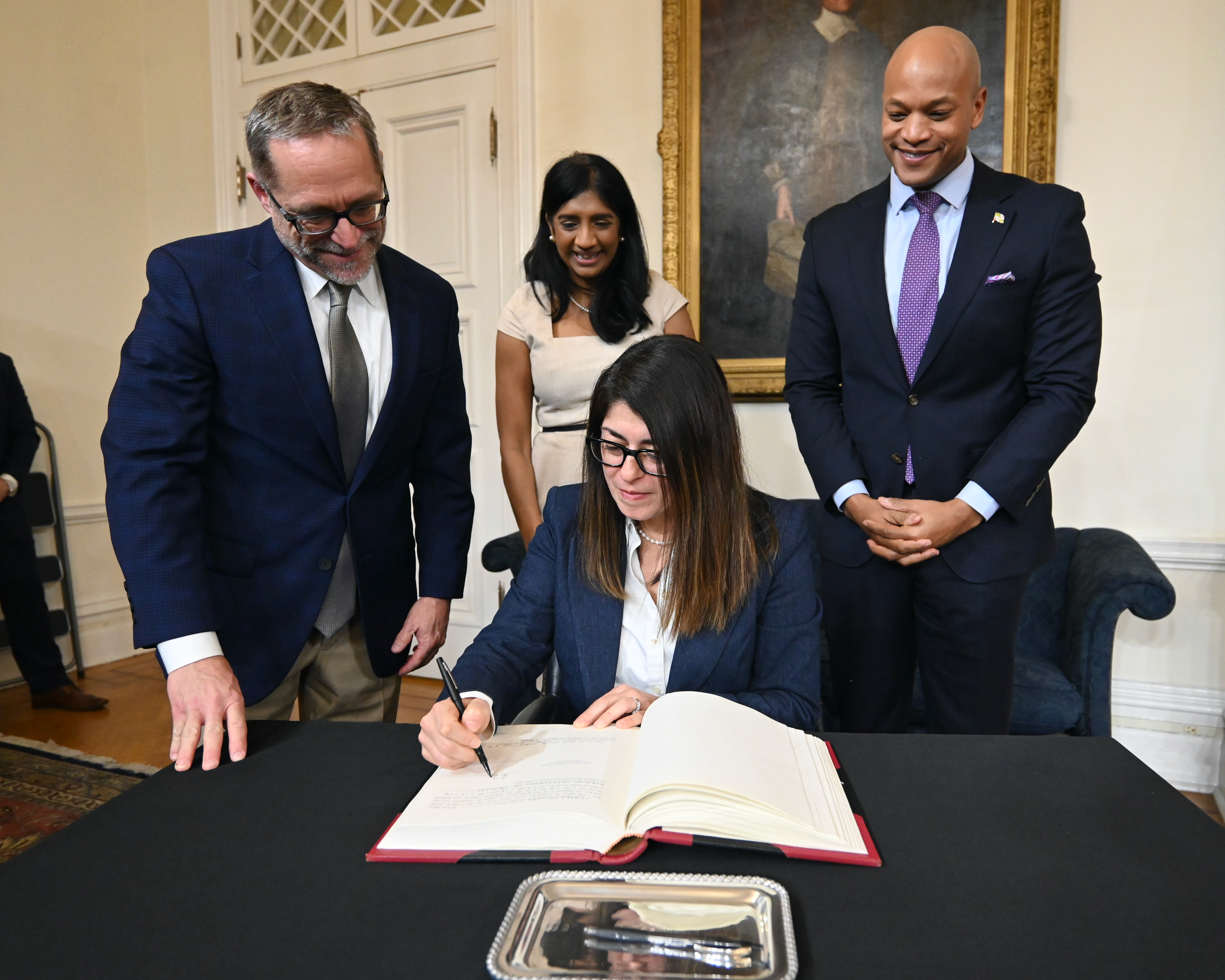
Wes Moore Swearing in, Laura Herrera Scott signing in March 2023

In January 2023, Scott was nominated for the position of Maryland's Secretary of Health by Governor Wes Moore. She assumed the role in an acting capacity from January 18 to March 2 and was officially named Secretary of Health on March 2, 2023. At the end of 2024, Scott was questioned by the Joint Committee on Fair Practices and State Personnel Oversight over the Clifton T. Perkins Hospital Center. The high security hospital had been the subject of coverage by the Washington Post during 2024. Longer term issues now included, abuse, a riot, a murder and a rape. Scott said that had been misled.

On February 6, 2025, Maryland Matters reported that Scott would resign as Secretary of Health on February 28, 2025. She was replaced in April by Dr. Meena Seshamani who inherited reported controversial and financial issues.
