= Aletheia McCaskill =

American politician (born 1971)

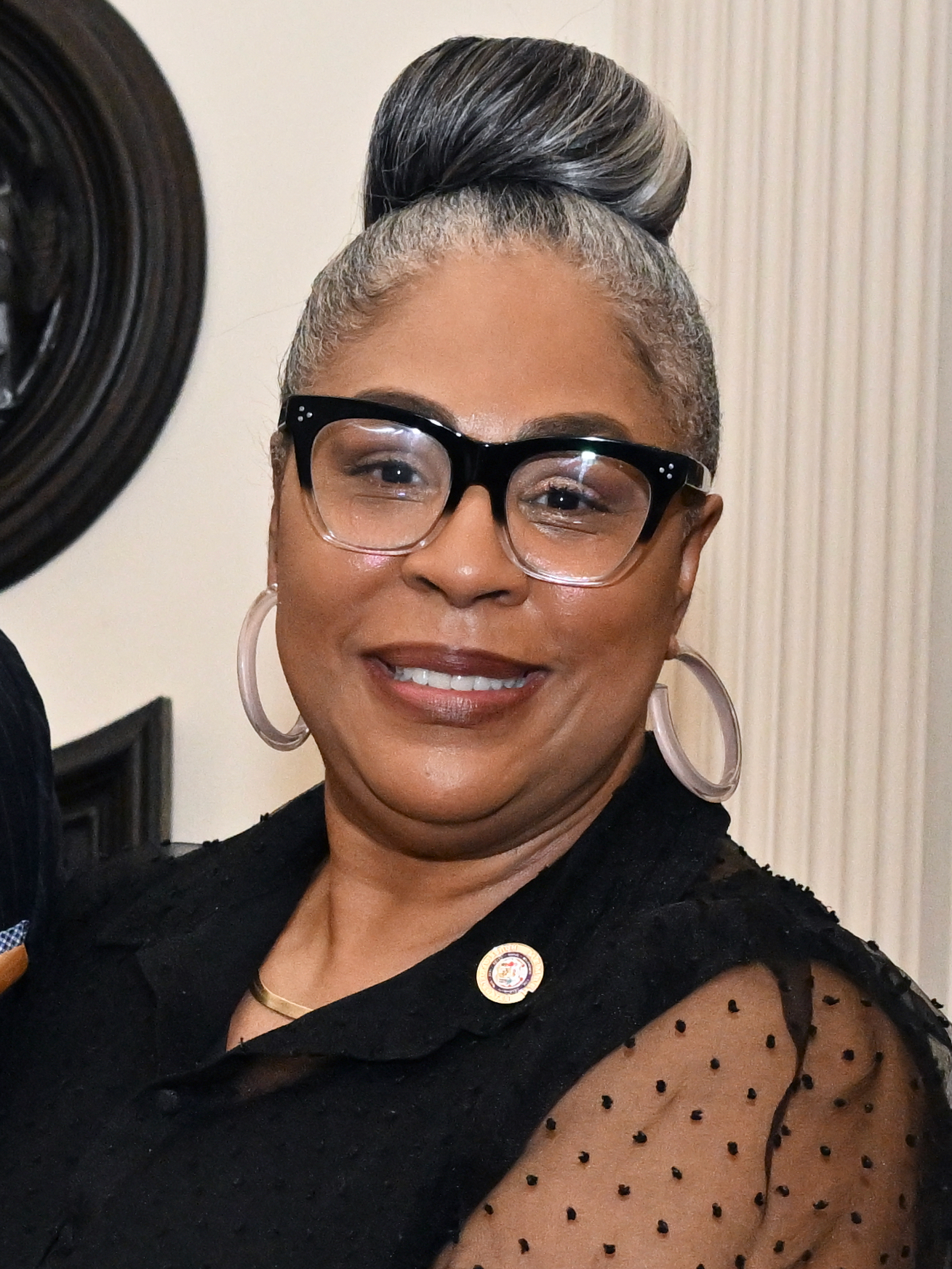

Member of the Maryland House of Delegates from the 44B district
- Incumbent
- Assumed office January 11, 2023 Serving with Sheila Ruth
- Preceded by: Pat Young

Personal details
- Born: September 30, 1971 (age 54) Baltimore, Maryland, U.S.
- Party: Democratic
- Education: Villa Julie College (BS); Community College of Baltimore County (AAS); Notre Dame of Maryland University (BS)
- Occupation: Child care provider, union activist
- Website: Campaign website

Aletheia McCaskill (born September 30, 1971) is an American politician and union activist who is a member of the Maryland House of Delegates for District 44B in Baltimore County, Maryland. She was previously a candidate for District 44 of the Maryland Senate in 2018.

== Background ==
McCaskill graduated from Carver Vo-Tech High School in 1989. She later attended Villa Julie College, where she earned a Bachelor of Science degree in information systems in 1994, the Community College of Baltimore County, receiving an associate degree in early childhood development in 2010, and the Notre Dame of Maryland University, where she received a Bachelor of Science degree in early elementary education in 2021.

McCaskill is the vice president of the SEIU Local 500 labor union, which represents teachers, child-care professionals, and part-time college faculty in Maryland and Washington, D.C. She previously served as the leader of the union's bargaining committee and as the chairwoman of its Committee on Political Education (COPE). She also previously worked as an early-learning and child-development specialist.

In September 2017, McCaskill announced that she would run for Maryland Senate in District 44, challenging incumbent state senator Shirley Nathan-Pulliam. In November 2017, McCaskill graduated from Emerge Maryland, a group dedicated to training and electing Democratic women to office. Her candidacy was endorsed by SEIU Local 500 1199SEIU, and gubernatorial candidate Ben Jealous. Despite an aggressive primary campaign, McCaskill lost to Nathan-Pulliam in the Democratic primary by a more than 2-1 margin.

In 2022, McCaskill ran for the Maryland House of Delegates in District 44B. She came in second place alongside incumbent Sheila Ruth, receiving 23.0 percent of the vote in the Democratic primary. She was unopposed in the general election.

== In the legislature ==
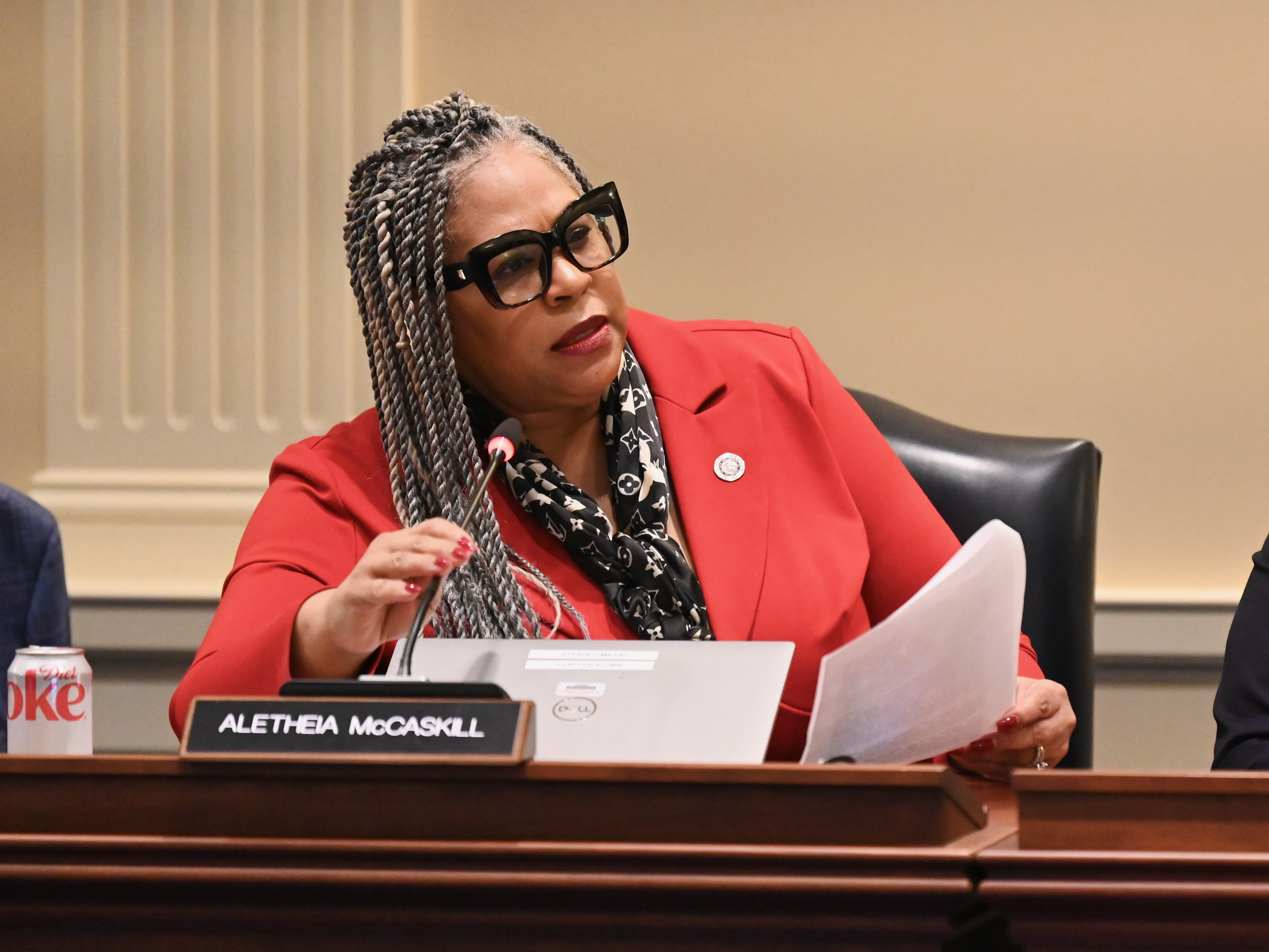
McCaskill in the House Appropriations Committee, 2024

McCaskill was sworn into the Maryland House of Delegates on January 11, 2023. She is a member of the House Appropriations Committee.

== Political positions ==
=== Minimum wage ===
During the 2016 Baltimore mayoral election, McCaskill canvassed for then-mayoral candidate Catherine Pugh, motivated by her support for a bill to raise the city's minimum wage to $15 an hour by 2022. She was disheartened by Pugh's veto of said bill.

During her 2018 state senate campaign, McCaskill said she would support raising the state's minimum wage to $15 an hour.

=== Social issues ===
During the 2026 legislative session, McCaskill introduced bills that would require the Maryland Department of Health to create a webpage of resources for family caregivers that includes information on safety planning for wandering and elopement, and would allow schools to coordinate with parents on voluntary use of location tracking devices for a child with a history of elopement.

== Electoral history ==
Maryland Senate District 44 Democratic primary election, 2018
Party	Candidate	Votes	%
Democratic	Shirley Nathan-Pulliam	10,217	67.3
Democratic	Aletheia McCaskill	4,955	32.7

Maryland House of Delegates District 44B Democratic primary election, 2022
Party	Candidate	Votes	%
Democratic	Sheila Ruth	5,774	25.8
Democratic	Aletheia McCaskill	5,132	23.0
Democratic	Aisha Khan	4,714	21.1
Democratic	Bishop Barry Chapman	3,660	16.4
Democratic	Patrick Cusack	1,644	7.4
Democratic	Shazia Shah	1,420	6.4

Maryland House of Delegates District 44B election, 2022
Party	Candidate	Votes	%
Democratic	Sheila Ruth	19,682	51.21
Democratic	Aletheia McCaskill	18,219	47.40
Write-in		532	1.38
