= Meena Seshamani =

American politician & surgeon (born 1977/1978)

- Seshamani in 2025

Secretary of the Maryland Department of Health
- Incumbent
- Assumed office April 8, 2025
- Governor: Wes Moore
- Preceded by: Laura Herrera Scott

Personal details
- Born: 1977 or 1978 (age 48–49)
- Spouse: Craig Mullaney (m. 2005; div. 2013)
- Education: Brown University (BA); University of Pennsylvania (MD); University of Oxford (PhD)

Meena Seshamani (born 1977 or 1978) is an American otolaryngologist, health economist and public official who has served as the Maryland Secretary of Health since 2025. She previously served as the deputy administrator of the Centers for Medicare & Medicaid Services from 2021 to 2025.

== Early life and education ==
Seshamani was born in 1977 or 1978. Her parents were Mani and Rama Seshamani. Raised in Warren Township, New Jersey, she graduated from the Pingry School in three years, afterwards attending Brown University, where she graduated with honors and earned a Bachelor of Arts degree in business economics, and the University of Pennsylvania, where she earned a Doctor of Medicine degree. She then completed her medical residency training at Johns Hopkins University, where she was a surgeon specializing in head and neck surgery and conducted research on health economics, afterwards graduating as a Marshall Scholar from the University of Oxford with a Doctor of Philosophy degree in health economics.

== Career ==
Seshamani was an assistant professor of otolaryngology at the Georgetown University School of Medicine. She was later the director of the Office of Health Reform at the U.S. Department of Health and Human Services during the Obama administration, where she helped shape and implement the Affordable Care Act, afterwards working as the vice president of clinical care transformation at MedStar Health from 2017 to 2021. Seshamani later joined the Biden administration, advising the administration on its COVID-19 response before ultimately being appointed to serve as the deputy administrator of the Centers for Medicare & Medicaid Services (CMS) in July 2021. During her tenure, Seshamani was involved with implementing drug price negotiations passed in the Inflation Reduction Act.

=== Maryland Secretary of Health ===
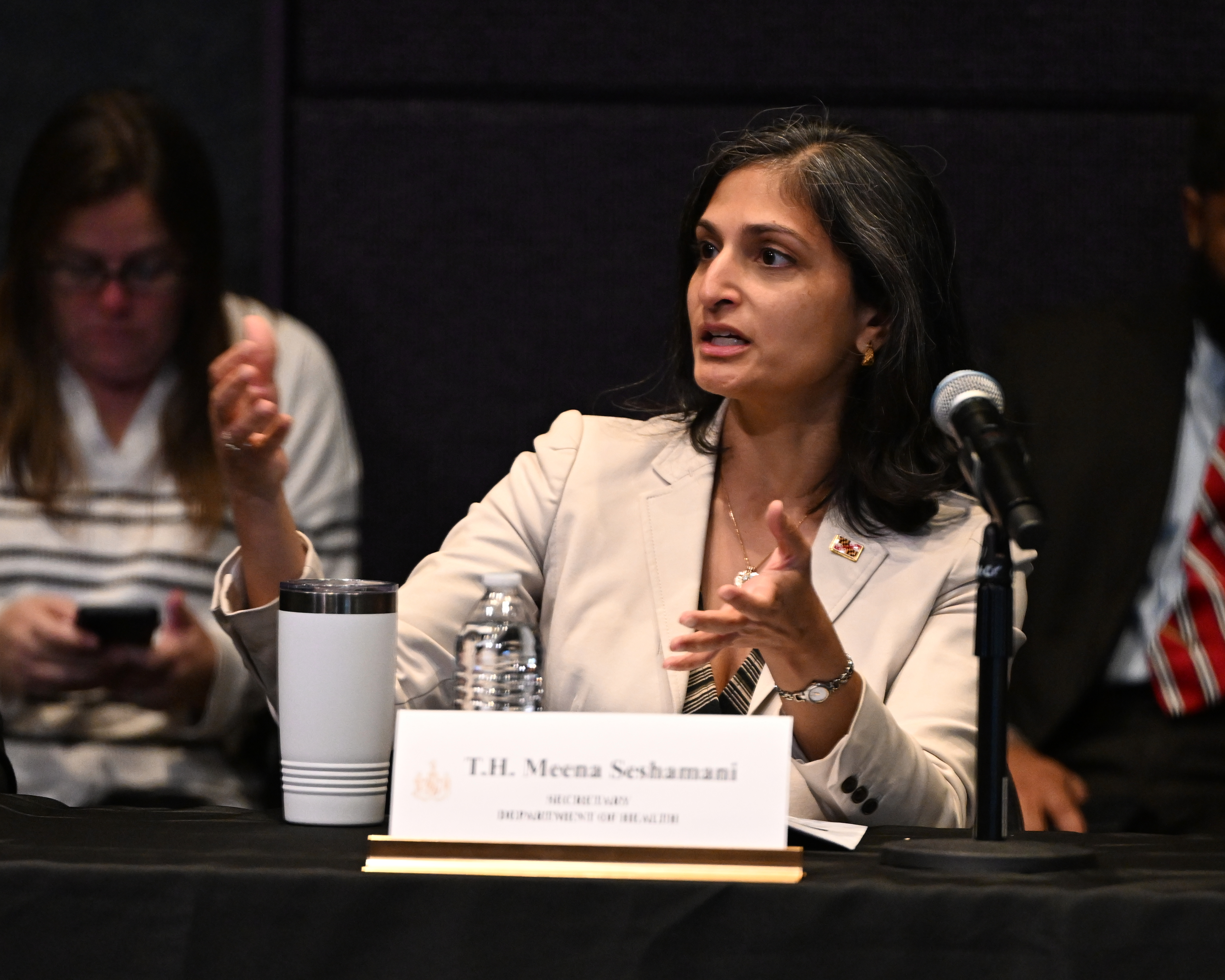
Seshamani attends a Cabinet meeting in November 2025

In February 2025, Maryland Governor Wes Moore named Seshamani as the next Maryland Secretary of Health, succeeding Laura Herrera Scott, who resigned at the end of the month. Herrera Scott's resignation came amid the 2025 legislative session, during which Moore proposed $457 million in budget cuts to the Maryland Department of Health's Developmental Disabilities Administration (though these cuts were later lowered to $164 million following negotiations between the governor and state legislative leaders), and a investigative report by The Washington Post that uncovered complaints of patient abuse and violence at the Clifton T. Perkins Hospital Center. Seshamani took office on April 8, 2025.

During her tenure, Seshamani focused on prioritizing behavioral health to improve drug treatments and prevent overdose deaths in Maryland, sought to rebuild trust with the disability community after funding cuts during the 2025 legislative session, and worked to implement systems to assist individuals affected by the One Big Beautiful Bill Act, which made cuts to Medicaid and expanded work requirements for Supplemental Nutrition Assistance Program (SNAP) benefits. The Maryland Department of Health also made progress in addressing staffing shortages and safety complaints at the Perkins Hospital Center. In 2026, Sheshamani was elected a member of the National Academy of Medicine.

== Personal life ==
Seshamani met her future husband, Craig Mullaney, when they were both students in Oxford. They married in 2005. Mullaney filed for divorce in May 2013.
