= Georges C. Benjamin =

American public health official

Georges Benjamin
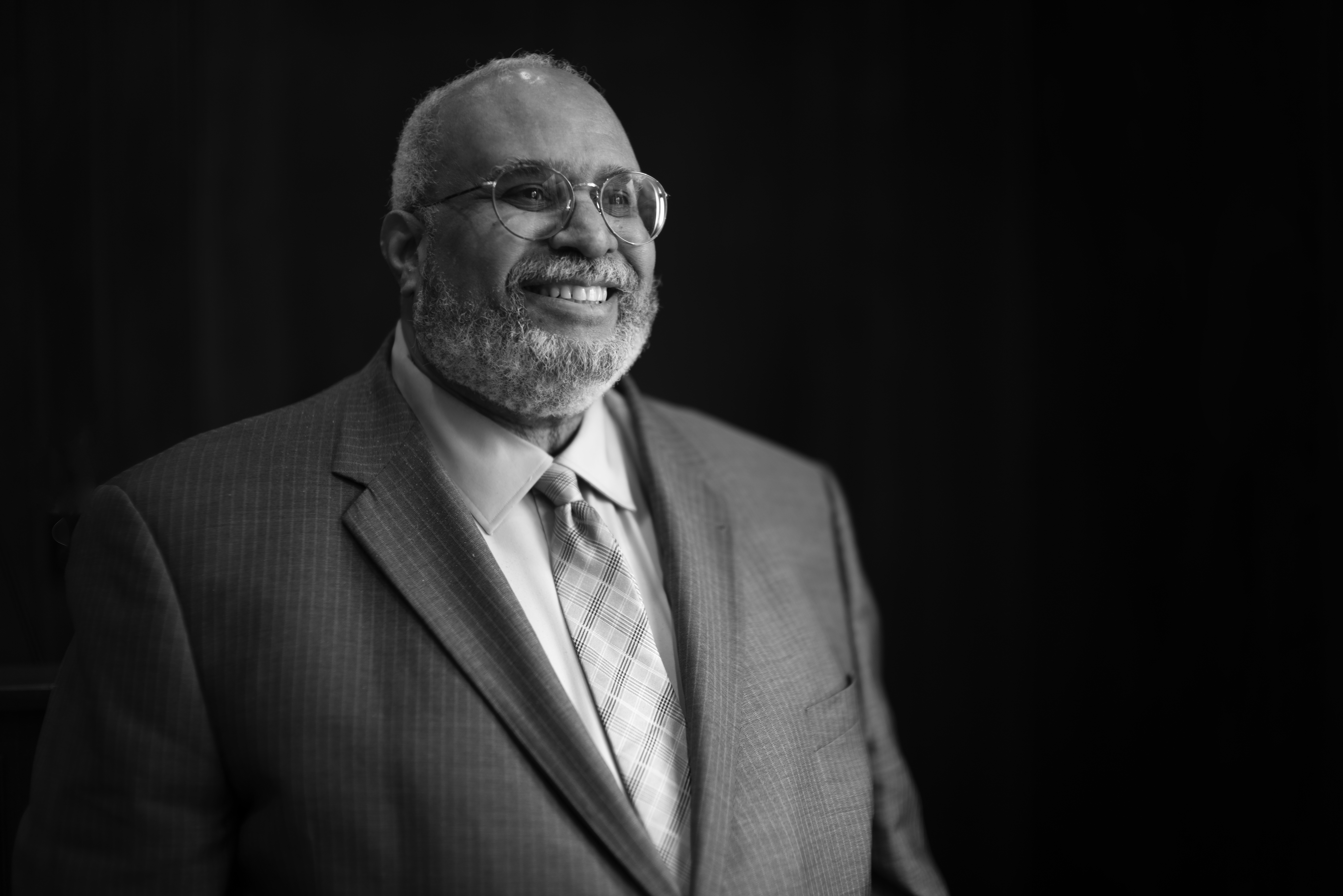
- Born: September 28, 1952 (age 74); Chicago, Illinois, U.S.
- Education: Illinois Institute of Technology (BS); University of Illinois, Chicago (MD)

Georges C. Benjamin (born September 28, 1952) is an American public health official who has served as CEO of the American Public Health Association since 2002, and previously as Secretary of the Maryland Department of Health and Mental Hygiene in the Cabinet of Governor Parris Glendening from 1999 to 2002. He is a member of the National Infrastructure Advisory Council and a fellow of the National Academy of Public Administration.

== Early life and education ==
Benjamin was born in Chicago, Illinois. He earned a B.S. from the Illinois Institute of Technology, and an M.D. from the University of Illinois at Chicago College of Medicine. He received the Distinguished Alumnis Award in 2008, and the UIC Alumni Association Achievement Award in 2024.

== Career ==
Following graduation from medical school, Benjamin began his career at the Madigan Army Medical Center in Tacoma, Washington in 1981, serving there until he was transferred to the Walter Reed Army Medical Center in Washington, D.C., in 1983. Following his discharge from the United States Army in 1987, he was appointed as Chair of the Department of Community Health and Ambulatory Care at the District of Columbia General Hospital, serving in that post until 1990. From 1990 to 1991, he served as Acting Commissioner of the District of Columbia Department of Health, and as Director of the Emergency Ambulance Bureau in the District of Columbia Fire and Emergency Medical Services Department. He returned to service as the Director of the Emergency Ambulance Bureau from 1994 to 1995. In 1995, he was appointed as Deputy Secretary for Public Health Services at the Maryland Department of Health and Mental Hygiene serving in that post until his appointment as Secretary in 1999.
