= Craig Mullaney =

United States Army veteran & author

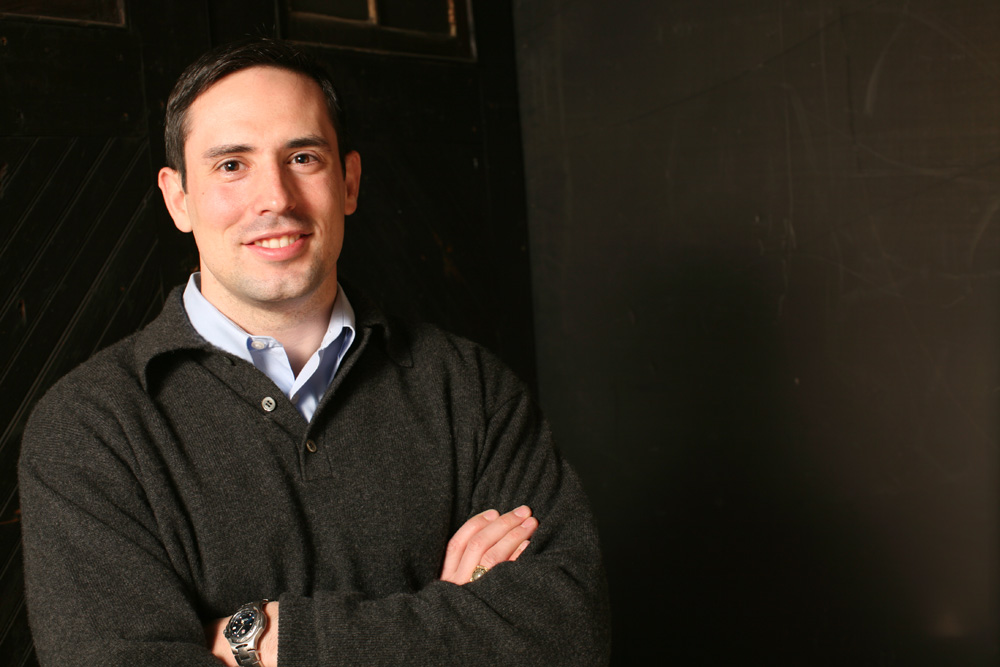
- Born: 1978 (age 47–48); Rhode Island
- Military career
- Allegiance: United States
- Branch: United States Army
- Service years: 2000 – 2008
- Rank: Captain
- Units: 10th Mountain Division; 3rd U.S. Infantry Regiment
- Conflicts: War in Afghanistan
- Awards: Bronze Star; Army Commendation Medal; Combat Infantryman Badge
- Other work: The Unforgiving Minute: A Soldier's Education

Craig Michael Mullaney (born 1978) is a United States Army veteran and author of The Unforgiving Minute: A Soldier's Education.

He was Senior Vice President of Content, Strategy and Operations at Ustream from 2011 to 2013. He also served as Senior Policy Advisor working for the United States Agency for International Development. In 2025 he worked as Chief of Staff to the CEO and Strategic Advisor at Coherent Corp. He was a Partner at Brunswick Group and worked on strategic partnerships and operations at Facebook.

== Early life, education and family ==
Raised in a Catholic blue-collar family in Rhode Island, Mullaney was the Bishop Hendricken High School valedictorian and was selected for nomination to the U.S. Military Academy in 1996. While a cadet, Mullaney double-majored in French and History, served as the cadet brigade operations officer in his senior year, and completed over 400 jumps as a nationally ranked member of West Point's sport-parachute team. He graduated second in the West Point Class of 2000. He was handed his diploma by then-Vice President Al Gore.

Mullaney attended Lincoln College, Oxford (2000–02) as a Rhodes Scholar. He earned a Master of Science degree in Economic and Diplomatic History and a Master of Studies degree in Historical Research.

== Family ==
Mullaney is married to Tomoko Hosaka Mullaney, executive director of the U.S.-Japan Business Council at the U.S. Chamber of Commerce. He was previously married to Meena Seshamani, who became Maryland's Secretary of Health. They met at Oxford where Seshamani was a PhD Marshall Scholar and he was a Rhodes Scholar.

Mullaney's younger brother, Gary, also attended West Point and served in Iraq as an infantry officer. Like his older brother before him, Gary also completed Ranger School.

== Military career ==
Prior to arriving at Oxford, Mullaney completed Ranger School at Fort Benning, Georgia, a grueling nine-week course designed to test small-unit leadership by simulating combat stress through strenuous tactical exercises. When Mullaney returned to the United States in 2002, he completed additional infantry training and joined the 10th Mountain Division, which had recently returned from Afghanistan.

In 2003, Mullaney served as an infantry officer with the 10th Mountain Division as part of Operation Enduring Freedom in Afghanistan, where he led a rifle platoon along the hostile border with Pakistan.

His platoon operated along the entire spectrum of combat operations—from humanitarian assistance to full-scale combined arms against al-Qaeda and Taliban forces. His platoon was the most decorated in Afghanistan during its tour and was commended in person by General Richard Myers, General John Abizaid, and Secretary of Defense Donald Rumsfeld. He was recognized with the Bronze Star, Army Commendation Medal for Valor, and the Combat Infantryman Badge.

After his tour in Afghanistan, Mullaney served in the 3rd United States Infantry Regiment (The Old Guard), in Arlington, Virginia. At this elite ceremonial unit, he planned portions of the 2005 presidential inauguration, marched in reviews for foreign dignitaries, and managed a team of Pentagon-funded software engineers developing management software for small units in the Army.

In the summer of 2005, Mullaney joined the faculty of the United States Naval Academy in Annapolis, Maryland, as a history instructor and Army Exchange Officer. He designed and taught an undergraduate course on the history of the U.S. Navy and American foreign policy. He left the Army in 2008 upon completion of his tour at the Naval Academy.

== Public service ==
Mullaney was on the national security staff of Barack Obama's presidential campaign, and served as the Chief of Staff of the United States Department of Defense Transition Team under co-chairs Michele Flournoy and Dr. John P. White.

He worked as the Principal Director for Afghanistan, Pakistan, and Central Asia for the Department of Defense from May 2009 to April 2010. In April 2010, he was appointed as a senior advisor on Afghanistan and Pakistan issues to the United States Agency for International Development.

== Author ==
Mullaney wrote the autobiographical The Unforgiving Minute: A Soldier's Education. Janet Maslin of The New York Times noted the "searing detail" of the Afghanistan combat description and the "impact" comes from its account of his "inner journey".
