= Sheila Ruth =

American politician (born 1963)

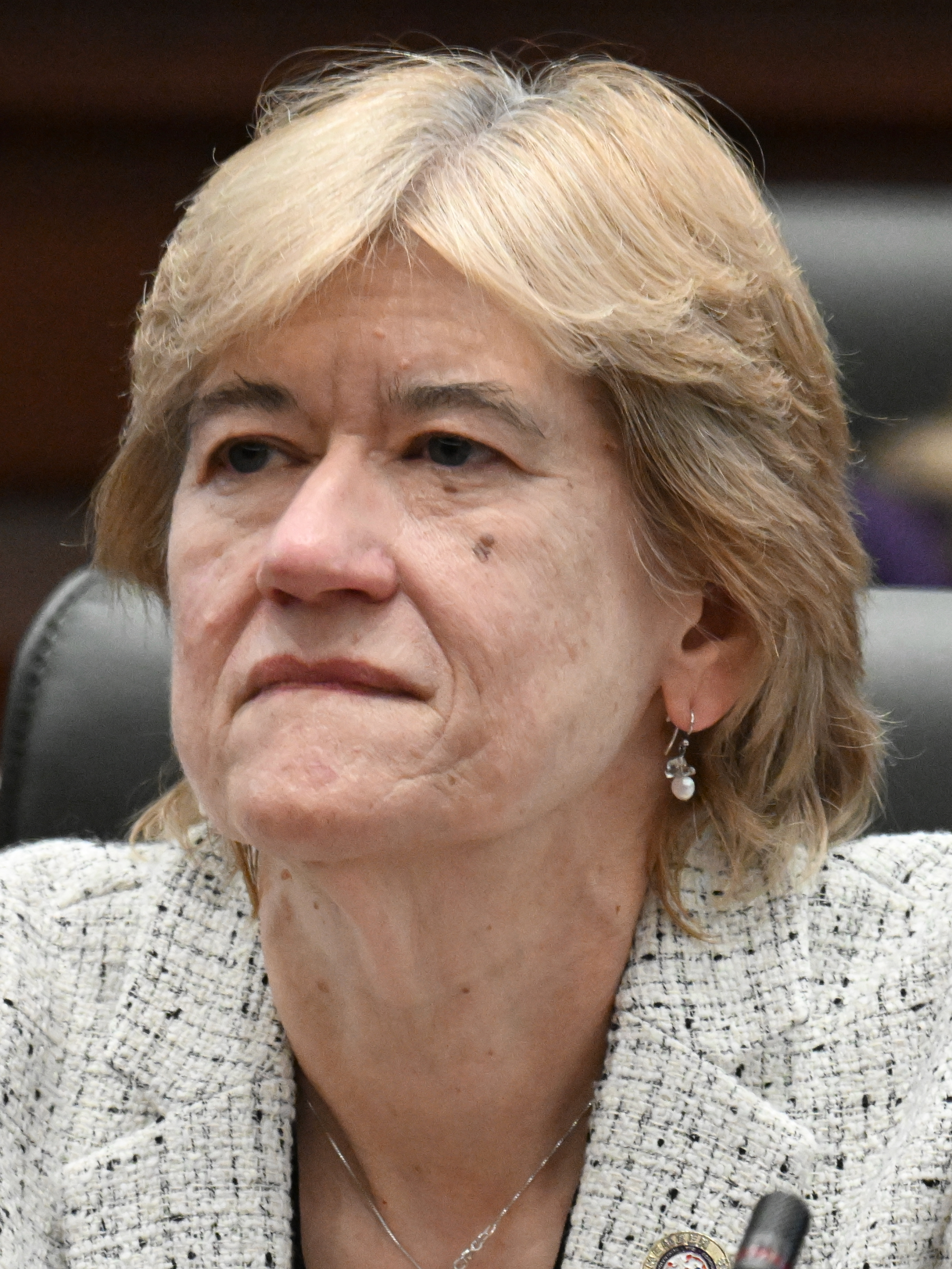
- Ruth in 2025

Member of the Maryland House of Delegates from the 44B district
- Incumbent
- Assumed office January 31, 2020 Serving with Pat Young (2020–2023) and Aletheia McCaskill (2023–present)
- Appointed by: Larry Hogan
- Preceded by: Charles E. Sydnor III

Personal details
- Born: October 22, 1963 (age 62) Baltimore, Maryland, U.S.
- Party: Democratic
- Spouse: Married
- Children: One son
- Education: University of Maryland University College, 1982-87. Villa Julie College, B.S. (liberal arts & technology), 1995

Sheila S. Ruth (born October 22, 1963) is an American politician who represents district 44B, based in Baltimore County, in the Maryland House of Delegates.

== Career ==
Following her graduation from University of Maryland University College in 1987, Ruth became a publishing systems programmer for Attis Publishing Services from 1987 to 1989 and a computer specialist for the U.S. Government Accountability Office from 1989 to 1992. Afterwards, she became a computer analyst for Villa Julie College from 1992 to 1994. She would receive a B.S. degree from Villa Julie College in 1995. She later worked as a website developer in the same year, and as a website technologies instructor in 1999. Following her graduation, Ruth became a self-employed website developer.

She has served as the president of Imaginator Press since 2003 and is the current vice president of Cybils Awards. From 2004 to 2008, she served as the president of Mid-Atlantic Book Publishers Association.

Ruth entered into politics in 2016, motivated by the 2016 presidential campaign of Bernie Sanders and horrified by the election of Donald Trump, by founding the Baltimore County Progressive Democratic Club.

In 2017, Maryland Democratic Party chair Kathleen Matthews invited Ruth to serve on the party's diversity leadership council. In July 2019, Ruth voted in favor of a resolution calling on the state's Democratic National Committee members to support a standalone climate debate. Only one of the fourteen Democratic National Committee members, Larry Cohen, voted in favor of a standalone climate debate, with five members voting present and eight members voting against it.

In 2018, she became a member of the Baltimore County Democratic Central Committee. She is also the co-chair of the Baltimore City/County chapter of Our Revolution and is a board member of Get Money Out-Maryland. As an activist, she organized support for a package of Baltimore County bills meant to strengthen ethical standards and institute public campaign financing, and was a lead organizer pushing for the passage of Baltimore County's anti-discrimination housing law that prevents landlords from denying applicants based on their source of income.

In January 2018, Ruth filed paperwork to run for the Baltimore County Council, seeking to unseat incumbent councilmember Tom Quirk. During the primary, she earned the endorsements of the Baltimore Sun editorial team, but was defeated with 43.3 percent of the vote.

== In the legislature ==
In January 2020, Governor Larry Hogan appointed Ruth to fill the vacancy created by the appointment of Charles E. Sydnor III to the Maryland Senate.

Ruth filed to run for a full term in 2022. She was endorsed by Progressive Maryland. In July 2022, Ruth finished first in the six candidate Democratic primary race for the two seats in district 44B.

=== Committee assignments ===
- Environment and Transportation Committee, 2020–present (environment subcommittee, 2020–present; natural resources, agriculture and open space subcommittee, 2020–present)

=== Other memberships ===
- Women Legislators of Maryland, 2020–present

== Political positions ==
During the 2026 legislative session, Ruth supported a bill to raise the minimum wage of Maryland from $15 to $25 an hour and eliminate all subminimum wages.

== Electoral history ==
Baltimore County Council District 1 Democratic Primary Election, 2018
| Party | Candidate | Votes | % |
| Democratic | Tom Quirk | 6,674 | 57 |
| Democratic | Sheila Ruth | 5,087 | 43 |
