= Reginald Oates =

American spree killer (born 1950)

- Born: Reginald Vernon Oates; May 24, 1949 (age 77); Benson, North Carolina, U.S.
- Occupation: Waste collector
- Conviction: Not guilty by reason of insanity
- Penalty: Committed to a mental hospital

Details
- Date: April 17–18, 1968
- Location: Gwynns Falls Leakin Park in Baltimore, Maryland
- Killed: 4
- Injured: 2
- Weapon: Blade

Reginald Vernon Oates (born May 24, 1949) is an American spree killer who killed four young boys within the span of two days in April 1968, in Baltimore, Maryland. He was found not guilty by reason of insanity, and sent for treatment at a psychiatric hospital.

== Biography ==
Reginald Oates was adopted at an early age by a couple in Baltimore, Maryland. The family lived in an urban area. As a result, they were subjected to segregation, with Oates spending his childhood and adolescence in a socially disadvantageous atmosphere, being attacked by his peers. In 1965, while he was in the 9th grade, Oates was accused of attempting to rob another student at gunpoint for a few cents, a claim forwarded by other students at his school, which he himself denied committing. He was found guilty, convicted and sentenced to two years imprisonment, which he served in an institution for juvenile offenders. During his imprisonment, Oates was physically and sexually abused by other prisoners, greatly scarring and traumatizing him. After his release, he returned to his parents, dropped out of school and found work as a waste collector. Not long after, he converted to Christianity, but had previously begun showing signs of a mental illness.

== Murders ==
On April 17, 1968, Oates lured 10-year-old Lewis Hill into Gwynns Falls Leakin Park, where he beat and raped him. Afterwards he slit Hill's throat and violated his corpse before slicing off his head and hands. The next day, using the same tactic, Oates lured three boys into the park: 8-year-old Larry Jefferson, his 5-year-old brother Matt, and 10-year-old Lester Watson, beating and stabbing all three numerous times. Like with Hill, he had sex with the children's bodies, gutting their internal organs and cutting off their genitals, which he took with him. The day after, the boys' bodies were found by the authorities. On that same day, Oates managed to lure two underage girls into the park, whom he unsuccessfully attempted to attack. He was quickly detained by law enforcement officers who, during his arrest, confiscated two bags and lunchboxes containing the murder weapons and parts from the bodies of the murdered children.

== Subsequent events ==
Following his arrest, Oates was charged with four murders, rapes, two assaults with intent of rape, and one armed robbery. He himself plead not guilty, declaring that he was insane. He was examined by psychiatrists, who, in November of that year, verified that Oates could not stand trial due to his mental condition. As a result, he was sent for compulsory treatment at the Clifton T. Perkins State Hospital in Jessup.
