= Maryland Legislative District 44 =

American legislative district

Maryland's legislative district 44
- Represents parts of the City of Baltimore and Baltimore County
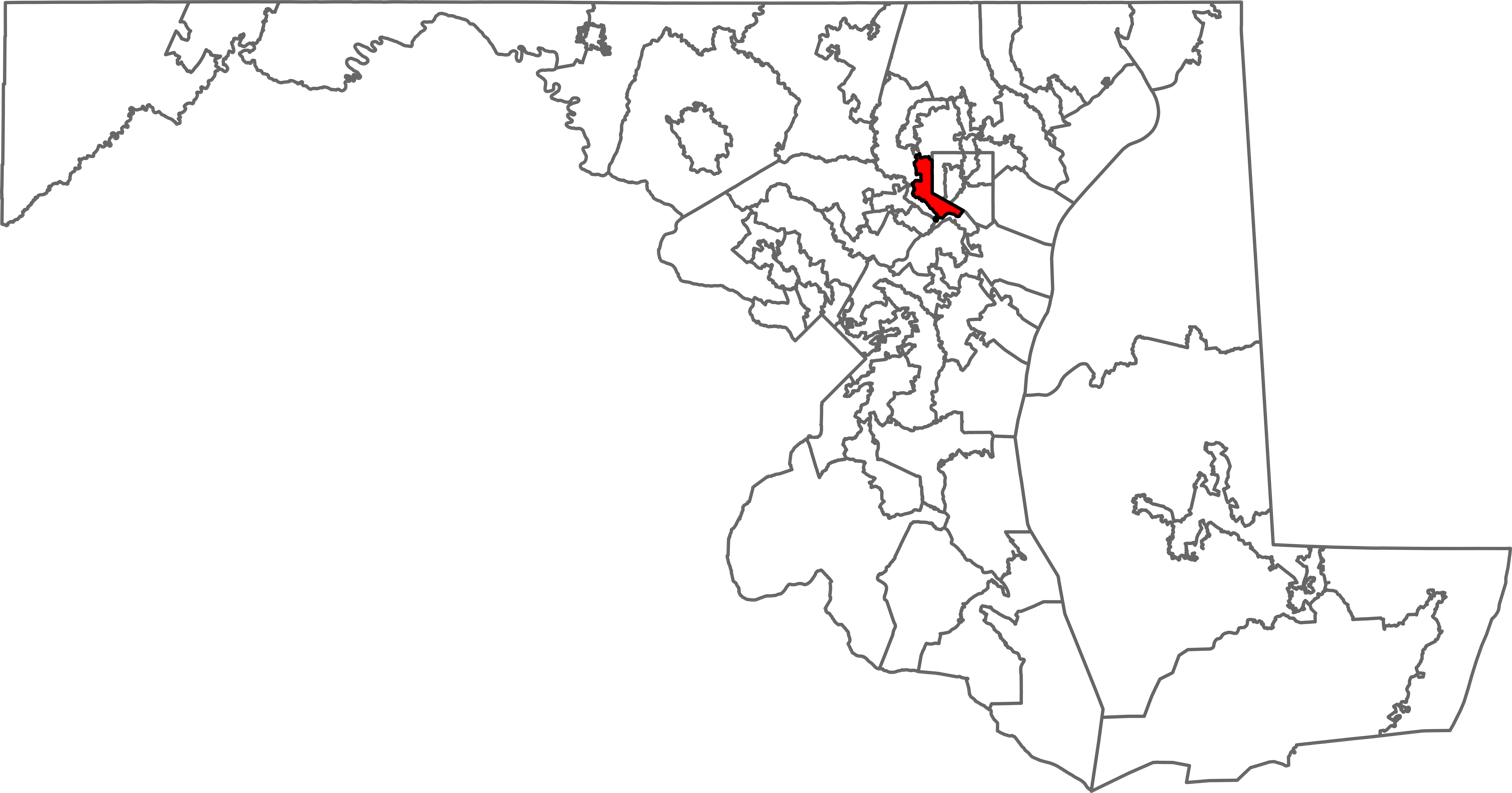
- Senator: Charles E. Sydnor III (D)
- Delegate(s): Eric Ebersole (D) (District 44A); Sheila S. Ruth (D) (District 44B); Aletheia McCaskill (D) (District 44B)
- Registration: 75.0% Democratic; 9.8% Republican; 13.8% unaffiliated
- Demographics: 22.1% White; 62.0% Black/African American; 0.3% Native American; 7.1% Asian; 0.0% Hawaiian/Pacific Islander; 3.4% Other race; 5.0% Two or more races; 5.6% Hispanic
- Population (2020): 114,562
- Voting-age population: 89,485
- Registered voters: 79,901

Maryland Legislative District 44 is one of 47 legislative districts in the state of Maryland and is one of the 5 located entirely within Baltimore City and part of Baltimore County.

Voters in this district selected three Delegates every four years to represent them in the Maryland House of Delegates. After the 2010 Census, the district was divided into two sub-districts for the Maryland House of Delegates: District 44A and District 44B.

== Demographic characteristics ==
As of the 2020 United States census, the district had a population of 114,562, of whom 89,485 (78.1%) were of voting age. The racial makeup of the district was 25,346 (22.1%) White, 71,041 (62.0%) African American, 373 (0.3%) Native American, 8,094 (7.1%) Asian, 33 (0.0%) Pacific Islander, 3,896 (3.4%) from some other race, and 5,778 (5.0%) from two or more races. Hispanic or Latino of any race were 6,422 (5.6%) of the population.

The district had 79,901 registered voters as of October 17, 2020, of whom 10,992 (13.8%) were registered as unaffiliated, 7,840 (9.8%) were registered as Republicans, 59,900 (75.0%) were registered as Democrats, and 757 (0.9%) were registered to other parties.

== Political representation ==
The district is represented for the 2023–2027 legislative term in the State Senate by Charles E. Sydnor III (D) and in the House of Delegates by Eric Ebersole (D, District 44A), Sheila S. Ruth (D, District 44B) and Aletheia McCaskill (D, District 44B).

== Election results ==
=== Democratic primary election results, 2010 ===
2010 Race for Maryland House of Delegates – 44th District Voters to choose three: (only the top 6 finishers are shown)
Name	Votes	Percent	Outcome
Keith E. Haynes	4859	25.9%	Won
Keiffer J. Mitchell, Jr.	4481	13.9%	Won
Melvin L. Stukes	3321	17.7%	Won
Ruth M. Kirk	2860	15.2%	Lost
Chris Blake	973	5.1%	Lost
Gary T. English	907	4.8%	Lost
