= West Hills, Baltimore =

West Hills
- neighborhood statistical area
- Location within Baltimore
- Coordinates: 39°17′43″N 76°42′29.5″W
- Country: United States
- State: Maryland
- City: Baltimore

Area
  - Total: 0.350 sq mi (0.91 km^{2})
  - Land: 0.350 sq mi (0.91 km^{2})

Population (2010)
  - Total: 2,523
  - Density: 7,210/sq mi (2,780/km^{2})
- Time zone: UTC-5 (Eastern)
  - Summer (DST): UTC-4 (EDT)
- ZIP code: 21229
- Area code: 410, 443, and 667

West Hills is a neighborhood in the Southwest District of Baltimore, located between the neighborhoods of Westgate (south), Franklintown (north) and Hunting Ridge (east). Its boundaries are drawn by the Baltimore County line (west), Baltimore National Pike (south) and North Franklintown Road (north). Its eastern boundary follows Cooks Lane from Baltimore National Pike, then Briarclift Road and finally Wynans Way to the intersection with N. Franklintown Road.

== Demographics ==
Its population, as of the 2010 census, was more than 75 percent black. The median household income of $35,557 in West Hills for 2010 was a close match to the citywide median of $39,113. However, the neighborhood's residents fared somewhat better, with 13.8 percent living on incomes below the poverty level, compared with 22.7 percent citywide.

== Public transportation ==
LocalLink 78 (BaltimoreLink) running along Cooks Lane at the eastern edge of West Hills, provides residents with transit bus service to Downtown Baltimore, Edmondson Village, Westview Mall and Security Square Mall.

CityLink Orange (BaltimoreLink) stops at West Side Skill Center, at the southeast corner of West Mills. It operates between Catonsville and Downtown Baltimore on the west side of the city, and continues to Eastpoint Mall on the east side of the city.

== See also ==
- List of Baltimore neighborhoods
