= Maryland Department of Health =

Health department in Maryland, US

Agency overview
- Formed: 1969 (as the Maryland Department of Health and Mental Hygiene); June 30, 2017 (as the Maryland Department of Health)
- Jurisdiction: State of Maryland
- Headquarters: 201 W. Preston Street, Baltimore, Maryland, US; 39.301917°N 76.621194°W
- Agency executives: Meena Seshamani, Secretary of Health; Aliya C. Jones, M.D., Deputy Secretary, Behavioral Health; Bernard A. Simons, Deputy Secretary, Developmental Disabilities; Vacant, Deputy Secretary, Health Care Financing & Chief Operating Officer; Atif T. Chaudhry, Deputy Secretary, Operations; Jinlene Chan, M.D., (acting), Deputy Secretary, Public Health Services; Bryan I. Mroz, Assistant Secretary & Chief Medical Officer; Webster Ye, Assistant Secretary for Health Policy; Kathleen A. Ellis, Principal Counsel
- Website: health.maryland.gov

The Maryland Department of Health is an agency of the government of Maryland responsible for public health issues. The department is headed by a secretary who is a member of the Executive Council/Cabinet of the Governor of Maryland. Currently the secretary is Meena Seshamani. Previous secretaries have included Laura Herrera Scott, Dennis R. Schrader, Robert R. Neall, Joshua Sharfstein, and Georges C. Benjamin.

== History ==
The department was formed in 1969 as the Maryland Department of Health and Mental Hygiene and was known by this name until June 30, 2017. Although the department itself was formed in 1969, some of its origins go back to the seventeenth and eighteenth centuries. In January 2022, the department disclosed a ransomware cyberattack discovered in the previous month causing disruption in healthcare systems already stressed by the COVID-19 surge.
