= Clifton T. Perkins Hospital Center =

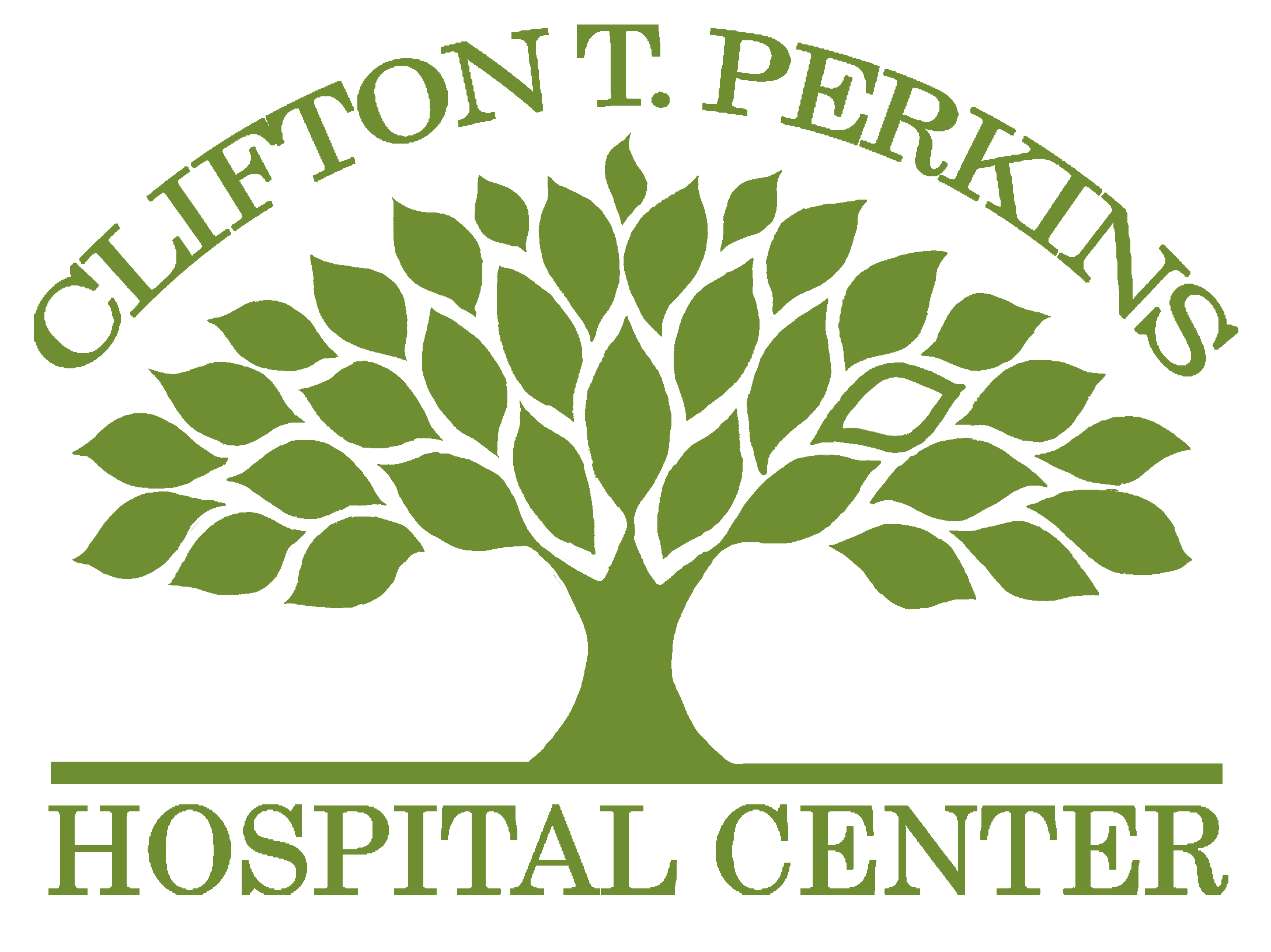

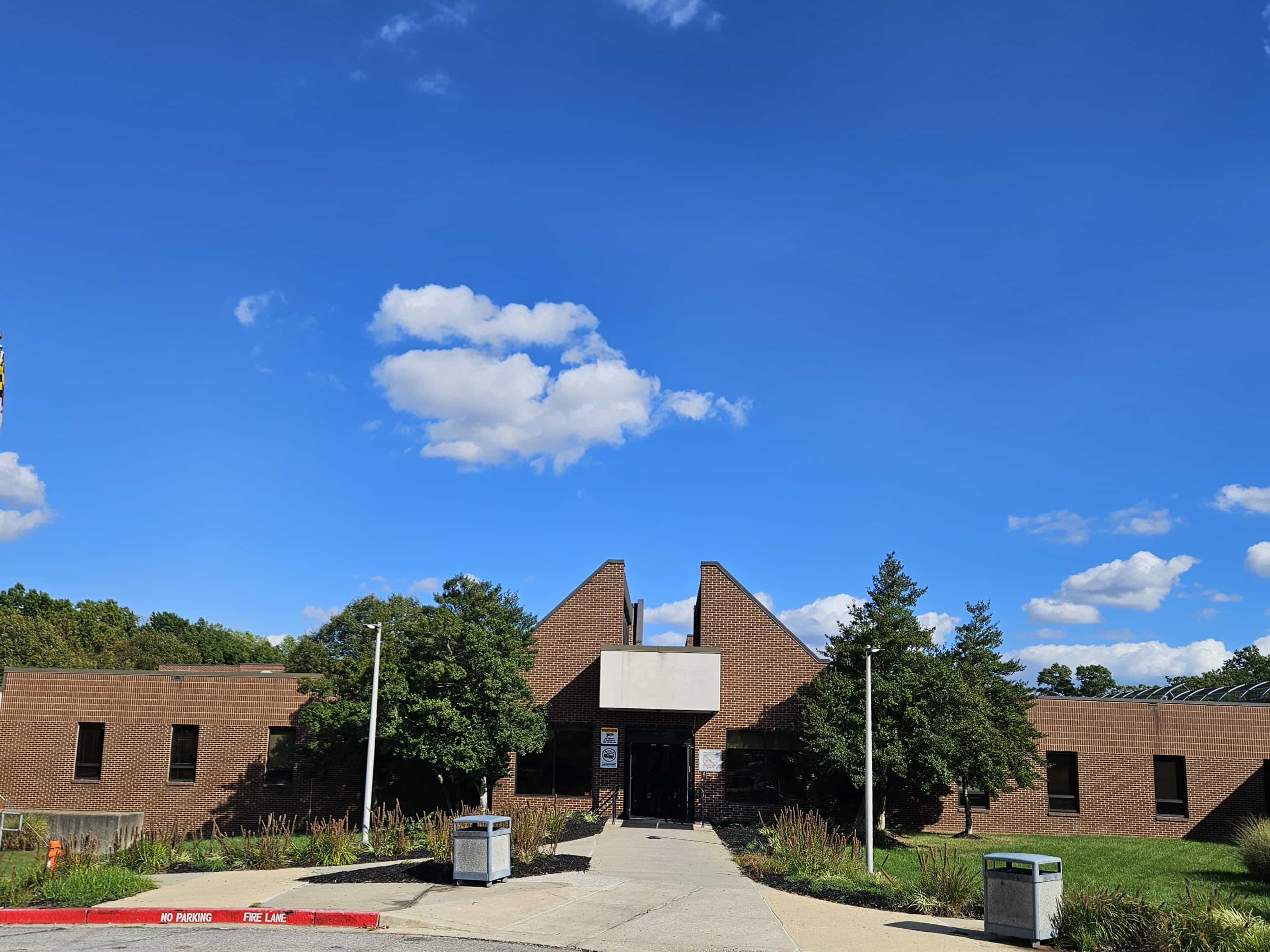
- Hospital entrance

Geography
- Location: Jessup, Maryland, United States
- Coordinates: 39°8′23″N 76°47′44″W

Organization
- Type: Specialist

Services
- Beds: 350
- Speciality: forensic psychiatry

History
- Constructed: 1959

Links
- Website: dhmh.maryland.gov/perkins/
- Lists: Hospitals in Maryland

The Clifton T. Perkins Hospital Center (CTPHC) is a 289-bed secure psychiatric hospital in Jessup, Maryland. It is the forensic hospital providing forensic psychiatric behavioral health care, with areas offering maximum, medium, and minimum security.

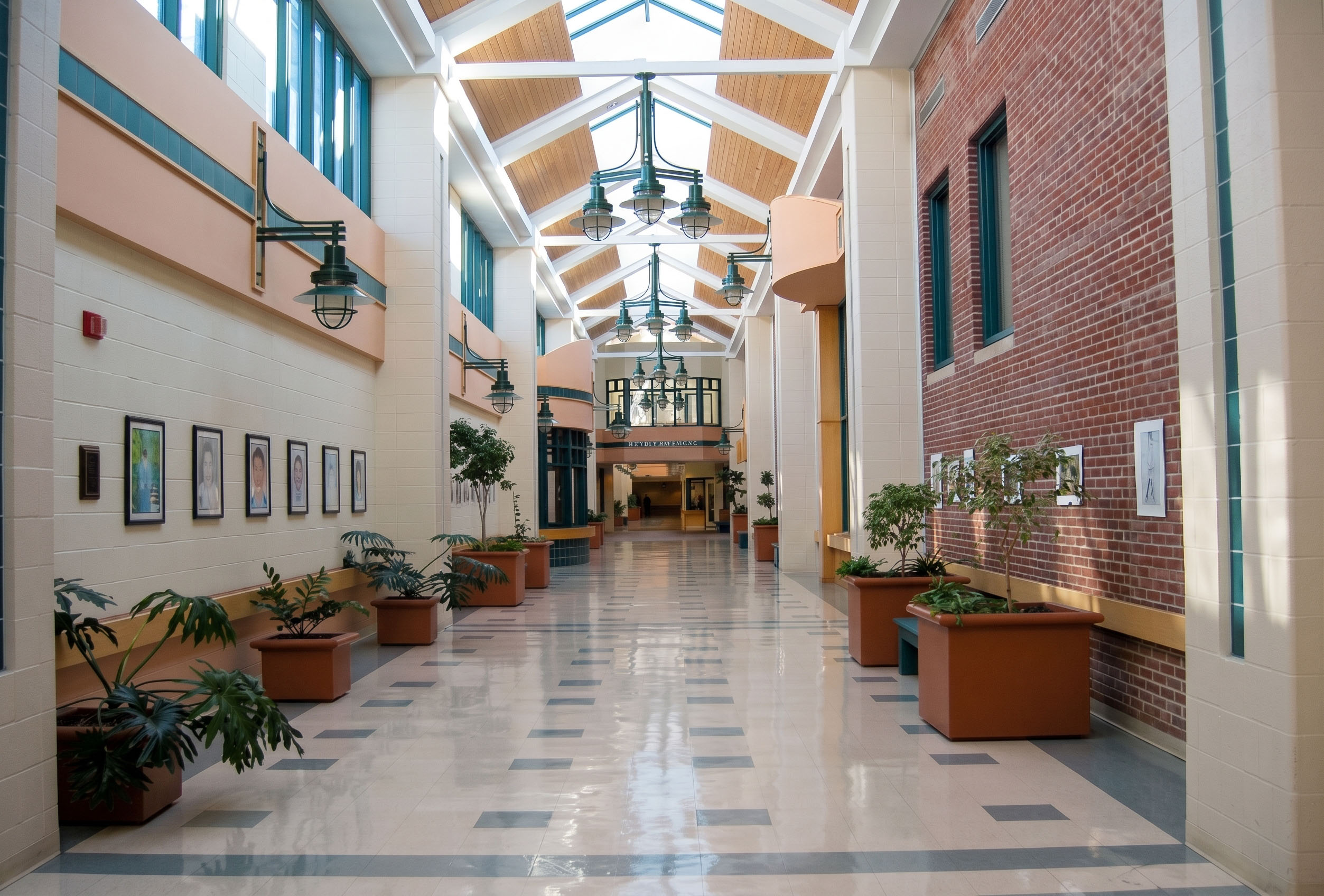
CTPHC Silver Wing Atrium

== History ==
The hospital was created by Article 59, Section 19A of the Annotated Code of Maryland, an act of the Maryland General Assembly on May 5, 1959, which states "There shall be an institution for persons requiring maximum security because of mental illness, with the powers and duties as provided in this Article and elsewhere in the laws of this State. Said institution shall be established at Jessup and shall be known as the Maximum Security Hospital."

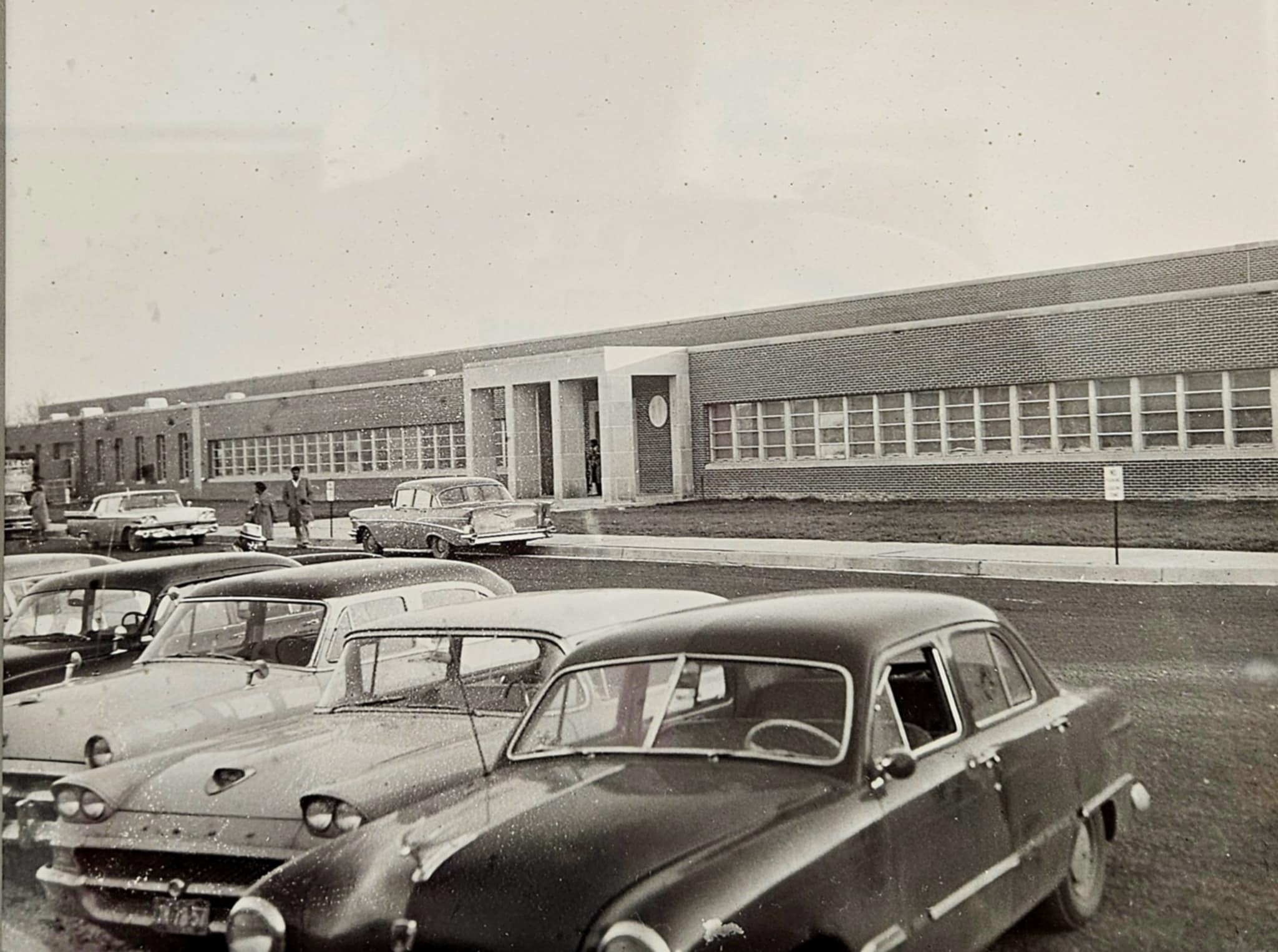
Entrance of CTPHC in 1961

Construction, at the cost of approximately three million dollars, was completed in late 1959. Prior to the opening of The Clifton T. Perkins Hospital Center, patients involved with the law were kept in each of the state hospitals. The primary function of the new hospital was to provide a diagnostic and evaluation service to the courts and to provide treatment and care for court-committed, penal and hospital-transfer patients. In October, 1959, Dr. Jacob F. Morgenstern, Director of correctional Psychiatry for the Department of Mental Hygiene, was named the hospital's first superintendent. The hospital was officially opened on January 12, 1966.

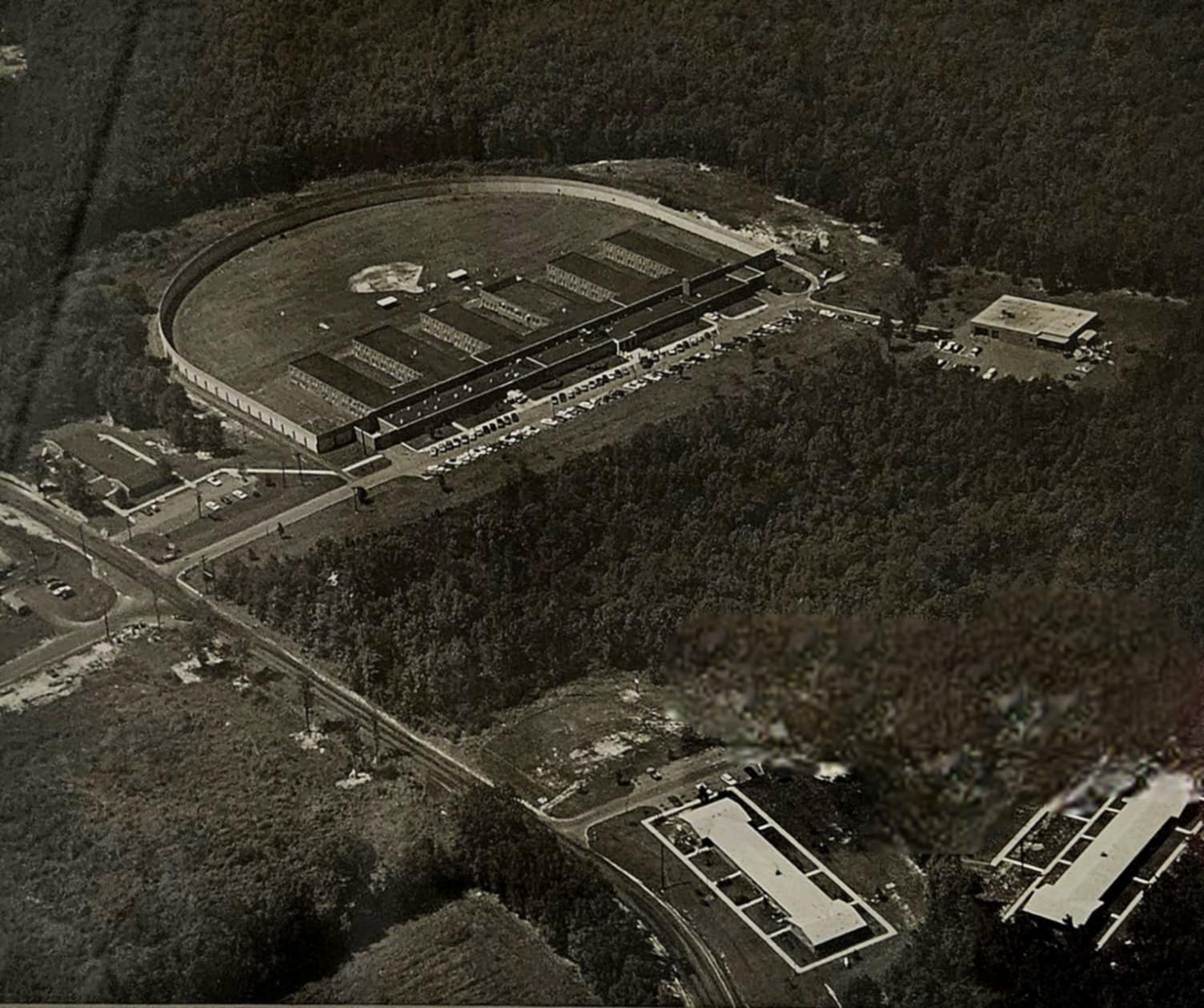
CTPHC Aerial Footprint 1961

The Board of Public Works agreed to change the name from The Maximum Security Hospital to the Clifton T. Perkins Hospital Center, in honor of Doctor Clifton T. Perkins, who was established as the first Commissioner of Mental Health of the State of Maryland in 1950 and who died in 1959. Dr. Perkins was a distinguished psychiatrist who arrived in Maryland with a mission to reform conditions in their public hospitals. He brought about the desegregation of Maryland psychiatric hospitals, despite considerable public opposition and with the necessity of federal court action.

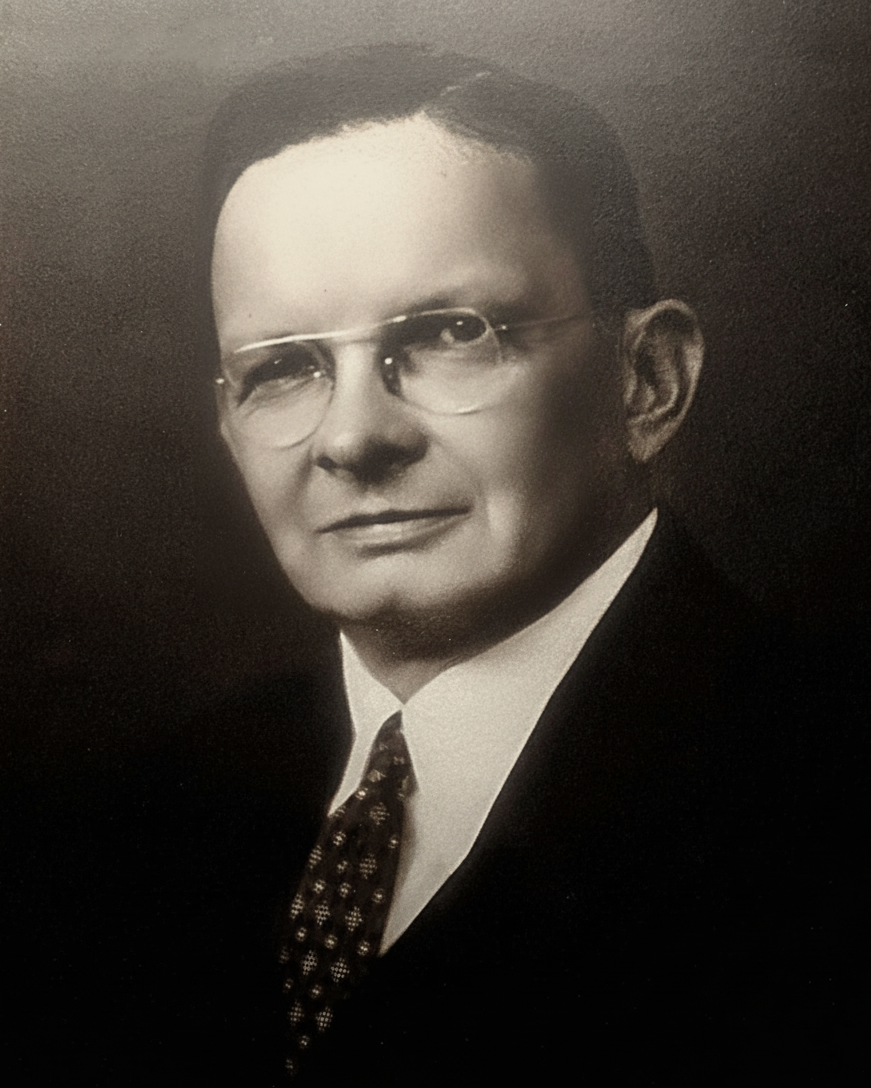
Dr. Clifton T. Perkins, first Commissioner of Mental Health of the State of Maryland, 1950.

== Function ==
Clifton T. Perkins Hospital Center is classified as a "Mental Hygiene Administration Facility within the Maryland Department of Health." The facility is also known as "Maryland’s maximum security forensic psychiatric hospital." Nearly all of its patients are involved in the legal system in some manner. CTPHC receives, evaluates, and treats several different groups of patients, including individuals who require psychiatric evaluation because they have been accused of a crime and have raised the Not Criminally Responsible (NCR) defense and/or their Competency to Stand Trial is in question. CTPHC also provides treatment to accused offenders who have been adjudicated NCR and/or Incompetent to Stand Trial (IST) and accepts inmates from fellow correctional and psychiatric facilities who meet the criteria for involuntary commitment (IVA), or whose behavior is violent or aggressive. It is the forensic hospital providing psychiatric behavioral health care, with areas offering maximum, medium, and minimum-security.

== Location ==
As of the 2010 census, the center of population for the State of Maryland falls in the hospital's northern parking lot.

== Notable patients ==
- Reginald Oates (born 1950), American spree killer

== In popular culture ==
- Clifton T. Perkins is mentioned in The Wire as the likely destination of the business card killer.
