= Maryland Legislative District 31 =

American legislative district

Coordinates: 39°9′N 76°36′W

Maryland's legislative district 31
- Represents part of Anne Arundel County
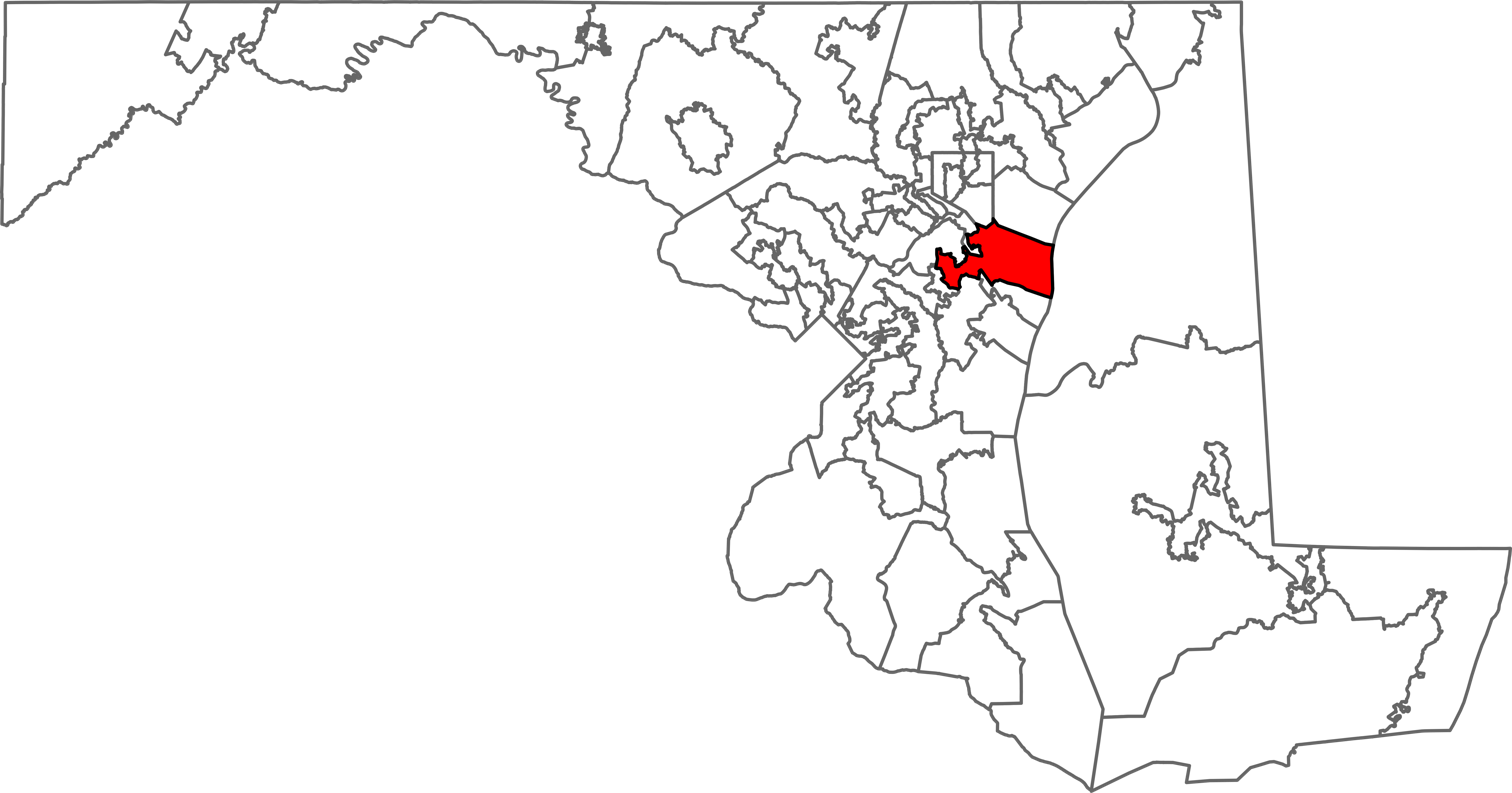
- Senator: Bryan W. Simonaire (R)
- Delegate(s): Brian A. Chisholm (R); Nicholaus R. Kipke (R); LaToya Nkongolo (R)
- Registration: 38.4% Democratic; 38.2% Republican; 21.9% unaffiliated
- Demographics: 69.1% White; 14.6% Black/African American; 0.4% Native American; 3.5% Asian; 0.0% Hawaiian/Pacific Islander; 4.3% Other race; 8.0% Two or more races; 8.3% Hispanic
- Population (2020): 140,611
- Voting-age population: 109,551
- Registered voters: 96,299

Maryland Legislative District 31 is one of 47 districts in the state for the Maryland General Assembly. It covers part of Anne Arundel County. Up until the 2020 United States redistricting cycle, the district was divided into two sub-districts for the Maryland House of Delegates: District 31A and District 31B. The district is represented by three delegates in the Maryland House of Delegates.

== Demographic characteristics ==
As of the 2020 United States census, the district had a population of 140,611, of whom 109,551 (77.9%) were of voting age. The racial makeup of the district was 97,123 (69.1%) White, 20,581 (14.6%) African American, 606 (0.4%) Native American, 4,908 (3.5%) Asian, 64 (0.0%) Pacific Islander, 6,027 (4.3%) from some other race, and 11,262 (8.0%) from two or more races. Hispanic or Latino of any race were 11,689 (8.3%) of the population.

The district had 96,299 registered voters as of October 17, 2020, of whom 21,137 (21.9%) were registered as unaffiliated, 36,831 (38.2%) were registered as Republicans, 36,960 (38.4%) were registered as Democrats, and 677 (0.7%) were registered to other parties.

== Political representation ==
The district is represented for the 2023–2027 legislative term in the State Senate by Bryan W. Simonaire (R) and in the House of Delegates by Brian A. Chisholm, (R) Nicholaus R. Kipke (R), and LaToya Nkongolo (R).

== Election results ==
=== Senate ===
View source data.

==== 2020s ====
2026 Maryland Senate election: District 31
Party	Candidate	Votes	%
Republican	Nic Kipke	29,611	54.4
Democratic	Brent Mulrooney	24,779	45.5
Write-ins		56	0.1
Total votes		54,446	100
Republican hold			

2022 Maryland Senate election: District 31
Party	Candidate	Votes	%
Republican	Bryan Simonaire (incumbent)	32,215	71.3
Libertarian	Brian W. Kunkoski	12,318	27.2
Write-ins		681	1.5
Total votes		45,214	100
Republican hold			

==== 2010s ====
2018 Maryland Senate election: District 31
Party	Candidate	Votes	%
Republican	Bryan Simonaire (incumbent)	29,489	61.0
Democratic	Scott Harman	18,778	38.9
Write-ins		61	0.1
Total votes		48,328	100
Republican hold			

2014 Maryland Senate election: District 31
Party	Candidate	Votes	%
Republican	Bryan Simonaire (incumbent)	28,338	72.1
Democratic	Scott Harman	10,929	27.8
Write-ins		34	0.1
Total votes		39,301	100
Republican hold			

2010 Maryland Senate election: District 31
Party	Candidate	Votes	%
Republican	Bryan Simonaire (incumbent)	25,744	62.1
Democratic	Ned Carey	15,688	37.8
Write-ins		35	0.1
Total votes		41,467	100
Republican hold			

==== 2000s ====
2006 Maryland Senate election: District 31
Party	Candidate	Votes	%
Republican	Bryan Simonaire	19,516	50.8
Democratic	Walter J. Shandrowsky	18,857	49.1
Write-ins		28	0.1
Total votes		38,401	100
Republican gain from Democratic			

2002 Maryland Senate election: District 31
Party	Candidate	Votes	%
Democratic	Philip C. Jimeno (incumbent)	23,381	62.3
Republican	David K. Kyle	14,100	37.6
Write-ins		30	0.1
Total votes		37,511	100
Democratic hold			

==== 1990s ====
1998 Maryland Senate election: District 31
Party	Candidate	Votes	%
Democratic	Philip C. Jimeno (incumbent)	22,917	66.8
Republican	Jacqueline J. Turley	11,364	33.1
Total votes		34,281	100
Democratic hold			

1994 Maryland Senate election: District 31
Party	Candidate	Votes	%
Democratic	Philip C. Jimeno (incumbent)	19,518	59.3
Republican	Nancy M. Schrum	13,402	40.7
Total votes		32,920	100
Democratic hold			

1990 Maryland Senate election: District 31
Party	Candidate	Votes	%
Democratic	Philip C. Jimeno (incumbent)	16,715	56.2
Republican	John R. Leopold	13,045	43.8
Total votes		29,760	100
Democratic hold			

==== 1980s ====
1986 Maryland Senate election: District 31
Party	Candidate	Votes	%
Democratic	Philip C. Jimeno	16,999	100
Total votes		16,999	100

=== House of Delegates ===
View source data.
Graph of results by candidate
View source data.

==== 2020s ====
2026 Maryland House of Delegates election: District 31
Party	Candidate	Votes	%
Republican	Brian Chisholm (incumbent)	27,473	18.2
Republican	Mike Jacobs	26,353	17.5
Republican	LaToya Nkongolo (incumbent)	24,926	16.5
Democratic	Heidi Buchanan Schmidt	24,658	16.3
Democratic	Joan Barone Cole	24,431	16.2
Democratic	Ryan Kelly Shaban	22,998	15.2
Write-ins		158	0.1
Total votes		150,997	100
Note: Nkongolo was appointed to this seat on January 10, 2025, to replace the resigning Rachel Muñoz.

2022 Maryland House of Delegates election: District 31
Party	Candidate	Votes	%
Republican	Nic Kipke	28,518	22.2
Republican	Brian Chisholm	27,570	21.5
Republican	Rachel Muñoz	26,117	20.4
Democratic	Kevin Burke	19,953	15.6
Democratic	Milad Pooran	17,213	13.4
Libertarian	Travis S. Lerol	8,509	6.6
Write-ins		356	0.3
Total votes		128,236	100
Note: Chisholm and Kipke were incumbent in district 31B, while Muñoz was incumbent in district 33.

==== 2010s ====
2010 Maryland House of Delegates election: District 31
Party	Candidate	Votes	%
Republican	Nic Kipke (incumbent)	24,143	22.0
Republican	Steve Schuh (incumbent)	22,805	20.7
Republican	Don H. Dwyer Jr. (incumbent)	22,452	20.4
Democratic	Jeremiah Chiappelli	12,943	11.8
Democratic	Justin M. Towles	11,968	10.9
Democratic	Robert L. Eckert	11,856	10.8
Libertarian	Joshua Matthew Crandall	2,015	1.8
Constitution	Cory Faust Sr.	1,660	1.5
Write-ins		105	0.1
Total votes		109,947	100

==== 2000s ====
2006 Maryland House of Delegates election: District 31
Party	Candidate	Votes	%
Republican	Steve Schuh	19,049	18.4
Republican	Nic Kipke	18,150	17.5
Republican	Don H. Dwyer Jr. (incumbent)	17,558	17.0
Democratic	Joan Cadden (incumbent)	17,533	16.9
Democratic	Thomas J. Fleckenstein	16,654	16.1
Democratic	Craig A. Reynolds	14,454	14.0
Write-ins		58	0.1
Total votes		103,456	100

2002 Maryland House of Delegates election: District 31
Party	Candidate	Votes	%
Republican	John R. Leopold (incumbent)	24,937	24.3
Democratic	Joan Cadden (incumbent)	16,906	16.5
Republican	Don H. Dwyer Jr.	16,807	16.4
Republican	Thomas R. Gardner	15,321	14.9
Democratic	Mary Rosso (incumbent)	15,127	14.8
Democratic	Thomas J. Fleckenstein	13,404	13.1
Write-ins		73	0.1
Total votes		102,575	100

==== 1990s ====
1998 Maryland House of Delegates election: District 31
Party	Candidate	Votes	%
Republican	John R. Leopold (incumbent)	21,632	22.6
Democratic	Joan Cadden (incumbent)	19,214	20.1
Democratic	Mary Rosso	15,372	16.1
Republican	Victoria L. Schade (incumbent)	15,366	16.1
Republican	Robert Schaeffer	12,092	12.7
Democratic	Thomas J. Fleckenstein	11,862	12.4
Total votes		95,538	100

1994 Maryland House of Delegates election: District 31
Party	Candidate	Votes	%
Republican	John R. Leopold	19,960	24.3
Democratic	Joan Cadden (incumbent)	16,492	20.1
Republican	Victoria L. Schade	14,801	18.0
Democratic	W. Ray Huff (incumbent)	14,203	17.3
Democratic	Charles Kolodziejski (incumbent)	13,176	16.0
Republican	Douglas Arnold	3,586	4.4
Total votes		82,218	100

1990 Maryland House of Delegates election: District 31
Party	Candidate	Votes	%
Democratic	Joan Cadden	17,201	21.4
Democratic	W. Ray Huff (incumbent)	14,311	17.8
Democratic	Charles Kolodziejski (incumbent)	14,230	17.7
Republican	James J. Riley	13,420	16.7
Republican	Evelyn O. Kampmeyer	10,732	13.4
Republican	Douglas Arnold	10,415	13.0
Total votes		80,309	100

==== 1980s ====
1986 Maryland House of Delegates election: District 31
Party	Candidate	Votes	%
Republican	John R. Leopold	14,586	22.3
Democratic	W. Ray Huff	14,005	21.4
Democratic	Charles Kolodziejski	13,050	19.9
Democratic	James J. Riley	12,895	19.7
Republican	Anthony J. Girandola	5,950	9.1
Republican	Charles E. Beatty	4,994	7.6
Total votes		65,480	100
