= 1994 Maryland House of Delegates election =

- November 8, 1994

All 141 seats in the Maryland House of Delegates 71 seats needed for a majority
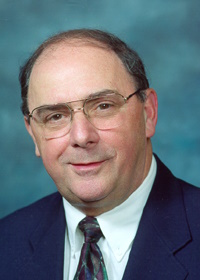

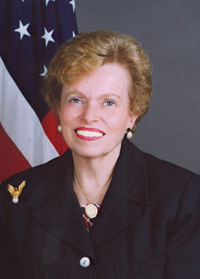
	Majority party	Minority party
Leader	Casper R. Taylor Jr.	Ellen Sauerbrey (retired)
Party	Democratic	Republican
Leader since	January 8, 1994	1986
Leader's seat	36th district	10th district
Last election	117	24
Seats won	100	41
Seat change	▼17	▲17
- Results: Democratic gain Republican gain Democratic hold Republican hold
Speaker before election
Casper R. Taylor Jr.
Democratic
Elected Speaker
Casper R. Taylor Jr.
Democratic

The 1994 Maryland House of Delegates elections were held on November 8, 1994, as part of the 1994 United States elections, including the 1994 Maryland gubernatorial election. All 141 of Maryland's state delegates were up for reelection.

Republicans tied themselves to the tax-cutting debate surrounding the gubernatorial election between Prince George's County Executive Parris Glendening and House Minority Leader Ellen Sauerbrey, which led to the party gaining 17 seats from the Democrats. This strategy was especially effective in Anne Arundel, Howard, and Montgomery counties, where the party saw most of its gains.

== Retiring incumbents ==
=== Democrats ===
1. District 3B: James E. McClellan retired.
2. District 4A: George H. Littrell Jr. retired to run for state senator in District 4.
3. District 5B: Lawrence A. LaMotte retired.
4. District 6: Leslie E. Hutchinson retired.
5. District 7: Louis L. DePazzo retired to run for the Baltimore County Council.
6. District 7: Connie C. Galiazzo retired to run for Congress in Maryland's 2nd congressional district.
7. District 8: Joseph Bartenfelder retired to run for the Baltimore County Council.
8. District 9: Gerry L. Brewster retired to run for Congress in Maryland's 2nd congressional district.
9. District 13A: Virginia M. Thomas retired to run for state senator in District 13.
10. District 14A: Joel Chasnoff retired.
11. District 15: Gene W. Counihan retired to run for state senator in District 39.
12. District 16: Brian Frosh retired to run for state senator in District 16.
13. District 17: Jennie M. Forehand retired to run for state senator in District 17.
14. District 18: Chris Van Hollen retired to run for state senator in District 18.
15. District 19: Leonard H. Teitelbaum retired to run for state senator in District 19.
16. District 21: Timothy F. Maloney retired.
17. District 25: Michael E. Arrington retired to run for state senator in District 25.
18. District 25: Ulysses Currie retired to run for state senator in District 25.
19. District 27: Gary R. Alexander retired.
20. District 28A: Stephen J. Braun retired.
21. District 28A: Michael J. Srague retired.
22. District 29B: J. Ernest Bell II retired.
23. District 30: John Astle retired to run for state senator in District 30.
24. District 32: Theodore J. Sophocleus retired to run for Anne Arundel County Executive.
25. District 37: Samuel Q. Johnson III retired to run for run for state senator in District 37.
26. District 43: Henry R. Hergenroeder Jr. retired.
27. District 44: Curt Anderson retired to run for state senator in District 43.
28. District 45: John W. Douglass retired.
29. District 46: Anthony M. DiPietro Jr. retired to run for state senator in District 46.

=== Republicans ===
1. District 5A: Richard C. Matthews retired.
2. District 9: John J. Bishop retired to run for state senator in District 8.
3. District 10: Bob Ehrlich retired to run for Congress in Maryland's 2nd congressional district.
4. District 10: Ellen Sauerbrey retired to run for governor.
5. District 13B: Martin G. Madden retired to run for state senator in District 13.
6. District 15: Jean Roesser retired to run for state senator in District 15.
7. District 33: Elizabeth Smith-Anderson retired.
8. District 34: David R. Craig retired to run for state senator in District 34.
9. District 36: C. Ronald Franks retired to run for U.S. Senate.

== Incumbents defeated ==
=== In primary elections ===
==== Democrats ====
1. District 1B: Kevin Kelly lost a redistricting race to Betty Workman.
2. District 11: Theodore Levin and Richard Rynd lost to Michael J. Finifter, Robert L. Frank, and Dan K. Morhaim.
3. District 12A: Louis P. Morsberger lost renomination to James E. Malone Jr. and incumbent Kenneth H. Masters.
4. District 26: Rosa Lee Blumenthal and Christine M. Jones lost renomination to C. Anthony Muse, Obie Patterson, and incumbent David Mercado Valderrama.
5. District 35B: Ethel Ann Murray lost renomination to David D. Rudolph.
6. District 39: John D. Jeffries lost renomination to Clarence Mitchell IV and incumbents Elijah Cummings and Ruth M. Kirk.
7. District 41: Samuel M. Parham lost to Nathaniel T. Oaks and incumbents Frank Boston and Margaret H. Murphy.
8. District 42: Leon Albin lost a redistricting race to incumbents James W. Campbell, Maggie McIntosh, and Samuel I. Rosenberg.
9. District 47A: R. Charles Avara lost a redistricting race to Brian K. McHale and Timothy D. Murphy.

=== In general elections ===
==== Democrats ====
1. District 4A: Thomas Hattery lost to David R. Brinkley and Paul S. Stull.
2. District 6: E. Farrell Maddox lost to Kenneth Holt, Diane DeCarlo, and incumbent Michael H. Weir.
3. District 12A: Kenneth H. Masters lost to Donald E. Murphy and James E. Malone Jr.
4. District 31: W. Ray Huff and Charles W. Kolodziejski lost to John R. Leopold, Victoria L. Schade, and Joan Cadden.
5. District 32: Victor Sulin lost to Michael W. Burns, James E. Rzepkowski, and incumbent Mary Ann Love.
6. District 36: W. Michael Newnam lost to Wheeler R. Baker, Mary Roe Walkup, and incumbent Ronald A. Guns.
7. District 37B: Robert A. Thornton Jr. lost to Adelaide C. Eckardt and incumbent Kenneth D. Schisler.

== Detailed results ==
All election results are from the Maryland State Board of Elections.

=== District 1A ===
Maryland House of Delegates District 1A election
Party	Candidate	Votes	%
Republican	George C. Edwards (incumbent)	8,155	100.0
Republican win (new boundaries)			

=== District 1B ===
Maryland House of Delegates District 1B election
Party	Candidate	Votes	%
Democratic	Betty Workman (incumbent)	7,050	68.8
Republican	Stephen P. Crossland	3,204	31.2
Democratic win (new boundaries)			

=== District 1C ===
Maryland House of Delegates District 1C election
Party	Candidate	Votes	%
Democratic	Casper R. Taylor Jr. (incumbent)	5,928	100.0
Democratic win (new boundaries)			

=== District 2A ===
Maryland House of Delegates District 2A election
Party	Candidate	Votes	%
Republican	Robert A. McKee	6,085	64.4
Democratic	Richard E. Roulette	3,358	35.6
Republican win (new boundaries)			

=== District 2B ===
Maryland House of Delegates District 2B election
Party	Candidate	Votes	%
Democratic	Bruce Poole (incumbent)	4,219	50.5
Republican	Richard D. Wiles	4,143	49.5
Democratic win (new boundaries)			

=== District 2C ===
Maryland House of Delegates District 2C election
Party	Candidate	Votes	%
Democratic	John P. Donoghue (incumbent)	4,013	56.9
Republican	Bertrand Iseminger	3,027	42.9
Democratic	Eugene E. Morris	9	0.1
Democratic win (new boundaries)			

=== District 3 ===
Maryland House of Delegates District 3 election
Party	Candidate	Votes	%
Republican	J. Anita Stup (incumbent)	20,262	24.5
Republican	Louise Virginia Snodgrass	14,071	17.0
Democratic	Sue Hecht	12,700	15.4
Democratic	Ronald L. Sundergill	12,466	15.1
Republican	Melvin L. Castle	12,227	14.8
Democratic	Royd Smith	10,810	13.1
Republican win (new boundaries)			
Republican win (new boundaries)			
Democratic win (new boundaries)			

=== District 4A ===
Maryland House of Delegates District 4A election
Party	Candidate	Votes	%
Republican	David R. Brinkley	12,296	30.9
Republican	Paul S. Stull	11,789	29.6
Democratic	Thomas Hattery (incumbent)	9,900	24.9
Democratic	Thomas Gordon Slater	5,785	14.5
Republican win (new boundaries)			
Republican win (new boundaries)			

=== District 4B ===
Maryland House of Delegates District 4B election
Party	Candidate	Votes	%
Republican	Donald B. Elliott (incumbent)	7,403	78.3
Democratic	Roy Pfeiffer	2,050	21.7
Republican win (new boundaries)			

=== District 5 ===
Maryland House of Delegates District 5 election
Party	Candidate	Votes	%
Republican	Nancy R. Stocksdale	22,705	23.3
Democratic	Richard N. Dixon (incumbent)	19,674	20.2
Republican	Joseph M. Getty	18,544	19.1
Republican	W. David Blair	17,819	18.3
Democratic	Ellen Leahy Willis	11,748	12.1
Democratic	Philip R. Deitchman	6,792	7.0
Republican win (new boundaries)			
Democratic win (new boundaries)			
Republican win (new boundaries)			

=== District 6 ===
Maryland House of Delegates District 6 election
Party	Candidate	Votes	%
Republican	Kenneth C. Holt	11,699	17.6
Democratic	Diane DeCarlo	11,445	17.2
Democratic	Michael H. Weir (incumbent)	11,254	16.9
Democratic	E. Farrell Maddox (incumbent)	11,135	16.8
Republican	Nancy Hastings	11,046	16.6
Republican	Michael J. Davis	9,857	14.8
Republican win (new boundaries)			
Democratic win (new boundaries)			
Democratic win (new boundaries)			

=== District 7 ===
Maryland House of Delegates District 7 election
Party	Candidate	Votes	%
Democratic	Jacob J. Mohorovic Jr.	16,059	25.4
Democratic	Joseph J. Minnick	15,880	25.1
Democratic	John S. Arnick (incumbent)	14,469	22.9
Republican	Jacqueline W. Madison	9,149	14.5
Republican	Robert J. Parsons	7,628	12.1
Democratic win (new boundaries)			
Democratic win (new boundaries)			
Democratic win (new boundaries)			

=== District 8 ===
Maryland House of Delegates District 8 election
Party	Candidate	Votes	%
Democratic	Kathy Klausmeier	17,496	19.9
Republican	Alfred W. Redmer Jr. (incumbent)	16,373	18.6
Republican	James F. Ports Jr. (incumbent)	15,244	17.3
Republican	Calvin Clemons	13,996	15.9
Democratic	Daniel E. McKew	12,931	14.7
Democratic	John G. Disney	11,886	13.5
Democratic win (new boundaries)			
Republican win (new boundaries)			
Republican win (new boundaries)			

=== District 9A ===
Maryland House of Delegates District 9A election
Party	Candidate	Votes	%
Republican	Martha Scanlan Klima (incumbent)	19,927	38.1
Republican	Wade Kach (incumbent)	18,734	35.8
Democratic	Shelley Buckingham	7,829	15.0
Democratic	Raymond A. Huber	5,823	11.1
Republican win (new boundaries)			
Republican win (new boundaries)			

=== District 9B ===
Maryland House of Delegates District 9B election
Party	Candidate	Votes	%
Republican	James M. Kelly	7,343	55.8
Democratic	Stephen W. Lafferty	5,823	44.2
Republican win (new boundaries)			

=== District 10 ===
Maryland House of Delegates District 10 election
Party	Candidate	Votes	%
Democratic	Emmett C. Burns Jr.	17,637	26.8
Democratic	Shirley Nathan-Pulliam	17,411	26.4
Democratic	Joan N. Parker	16,919	25.7
Republican	Beverly E. Goldstein	5,535	8.4
Republican	Clifton McDonald	4,321	6.6
Republican	Clifford H. Andrews	4,039	6.1
Democratic win (new boundaries)			
Democratic win (new boundaries)			
Democratic win (new boundaries)			

=== District 11 ===
Maryland House of Delegates District 11 election
Party	Candidate	Votes	%
Democratic	Michael J. Finifter	20,489	19.3
Democratic	Dan K. Morhaim	18,952	17.9
Democratic	Robert L. Frank	18,359	17.3
Republican	Michael Buchanan	17,915	16.9
Republican	Jodi L. Hammerman	15,744	14.8
Republican	Christian Cavey	14,638	13.8
Democratic win (new boundaries)			
Democratic win (new boundaries)			
Democratic win (new boundaries)			

=== District 12A ===
Maryland House of Delegates District 12A election
Party	Candidate	Votes	%
Republican	Donald E. Murphy	10,340	27.1
Democratic	James E. Malone Jr.	9,712	25.4
Republican	Donald Drehoff	9,596	25.1
Democratic	Kenneth H. Masters (incumbent)	8,527	22.3
Republican win (new boundaries)			
Democratic win (new boundaries)			

=== District 12B ===
Maryland House of Delegates District 12B election
Party	Candidate	Votes	%
Democratic	Elizabeth Bobo	7,887	58.8
Republican	Charles E. Scott	5,535	41.2
Democratic win (new boundaries)			

=== District 13A ===
Maryland House of Delegates District 13A election
Party	Candidate	Votes	%
Democratic	Shane Pendergrass	12,235	27.4
Democratic	Frank S. Turner	10,829	24.2
Republican	Michael Grasso	10,100	22.6
Republican	Kenneth Miller	7,096	15.9
Independent	Arthur Reynolds	4,467	10.0
Democratic win (new boundaries)			
Democratic win (new boundaries)			

=== District 13B ===
Maryland House of Delegates District 13B election
Party	Candidate	Votes	%
Republican	John S. Morgan (incumbent)	4,167	57.3
Democratic	John A. Giannetti Jr.	3,101	42.7
Republican win (new boundaries)			

=== District 14A ===
Maryland House of Delegates District 14A election
Party	Candidate	Votes	%
Republican	Patricia Anne Faulkner (incumbent)	6,210	52.0
Democratic	Sandra J. Morse	5,739	48.0
Republican win (new boundaries)			

=== District 14B ===
Maryland House of Delegates District 14B election
Party	Candidate	Votes	%
Republican	Robert Flanagan (incumbent)	18,154	31.5
Republican	Robert H. Kittleman (incumbent)	17,975	31.2
Democratic	Andrew D. Levy	10,773	18.7
Democratic	Carolyn H. Willis	10,731	18.6
Republican win (new boundaries)			
Republican win (new boundaries)			

=== District 15 ===
Maryland House of Delegates District 15 election
Party	Candidate	Votes	%
Democratic	Mark Kennedy Shriver	20,696	19.9
Republican	Jean B. Cryor	18,804	18.1
Republican	Richard A. La Vay (incumbent)	17,214	16.6
Democratic	Stuart D. Schooler	15,882	15.3
Republican	Davis M. Richardson	15,847	15.3
Democratic	Elizabeth Tookie Gentilcore	15,325	14.8
Democratic win (new boundaries)			
Republican win (new boundaries)			
Republican win (new boundaries)			

=== District 16 ===
Maryland House of Delegates District 16 election
Party	Candidate	Votes	%
Democratic	Nancy Kopp (incumbent)	25,038	21.7
Democratic	Gilbert J. Genn (incumbent)	24,285	21.0
Democratic	Marilyn R. Goldwater	24,180	20.9
Republican	Brian Riley	14,818	12.8
Republican	Douglas M. Brown	13,872	12.0
Republican	Augustus Alonza	13,289	11.5
Democratic win (new boundaries)			
Democratic win (new boundaries)			
Democratic win (new boundaries)			

=== District 17 ===
Maryland House of Delegates District 17 election
Party	Candidate	Votes	%
Democratic	Michael R. Gordon (incumbent)	18,154	28.4
Democratic	Cheryl Kagan	17,081	26.7
Democratic	Kumar P. Barve (incumbent)	15,978	25.0
Republican	Harrison W. Fox Jr.	12,709	19.9
Democratic win (new boundaries)			
Democratic win (new boundaries)			
Democratic win (new boundaries)			

=== District 18 ===
Maryland House of Delegates District 18 election
Party	Candidate	Votes	%
Democratic	Sharon M. Grosfeld	20,108	22.4
Democratic	Leon G. Billings (incumbent)	19,399	21.6
Democratic	John Adams Hurson (incumbent)	19,326	21.5
Republican	James Daniel Grazko	10,222	11.4
Republican	Eric H. Myrland	9,418	10.5
Republican	Socrates Yakoumatos	8,947	10.0
Independent	Scott Becker	2,323	2.6
Democratic win (new boundaries)			
Democratic win (new boundaries)			
Democratic win (new boundaries)			

=== District 19 ===
Maryland House of Delegates District 19 election
Party	Candidate	Votes	%
Democratic	Henry B. Heller (incumbent)	20,939	20.7
Democratic	Adrienne A. Mandel	20,193	19.9
Democratic	Carol S. Petzold (incumbent)	20,160	19.9
Republican	Richard G. Solomon	14,074	13.9
Republican	John P. Hewitt	13,752	13.6
Republican	Anthony M. Mora	12,146	12.0
Democratic win (new boundaries)			
Democratic win (new boundaries)			
Democratic win (new boundaries)			

=== District 20 ===
Maryland House of Delegates District 20 election
Party	Candidate	Votes	%
Democratic	Dana Lee Dembrow (incumbent)	19,679	29.7
Democratic	Sheila E. Hixson (incumbent)	19,423	29.3
Democratic	Peter Franchot (incumbent)	18,854	28.5
Democratic	James Harrison	8,248	12.5
Democratic win (new boundaries)			
Democratic win (new boundaries)			
Democratic win (new boundaries)			

=== District 21 ===
Maryland House of Delegates District 21 election
Party	Candidate	Votes	%
Democratic	Pauline Menes (incumbent)	13,207	29.0
Democratic	James Rosapepe (incumbent)	12,725	27.9
Democratic	Barbara A. Frush	12,109	26.6
Republican	Herbert F. Frymark	7,554	16.6
Democratic win (new boundaries)			
Democratic win (new boundaries)			
Democratic win (new boundaries)			

=== District 22A ===
Maryland House of Delegates District 22A election
Party	Candidate	Votes	%
Democratic	Richard A. Palumbo (incumbent)	9,246	33.9
Democratic	Anne Healey (incumbent)	8,475	31.1
Republican	Tony McConkey	5,584	20.5
Republican	Keith L. Poptanich	3,989	14.6
Democratic win (new boundaries)			
Democratic win (new boundaries)			

=== District 22B ===
Maryland House of Delegates District 22B election
Party	Candidate	Votes	%
Democratic	Rushern Baker (incumbent)	3,244	100.0
Democratic win (new boundaries)			

=== District 23 ===
Maryland House of Delegates District 23 election
Party	Candidate	Votes	%
Democratic	Mary A. Conroy (incumbent)	21,435	23.4
Democratic	Joan Breslin Pitkin (incumbent)	20,930	22.8
Democratic	James W. Hubbard (incumbent)	18,978	20.7
Republican	D. Alfred Schauer	10,267	11.2
Republican	Paul Tucker	10,140	11.1
Democratic	Theodore W. Henderson	9,862	10.8
Democratic win (new boundaries)			
Democratic win (new boundaries)			
Democratic win (new boundaries)			

=== District 24 ===
Maryland House of Delegates District 24 election
Party	Candidate	Votes	%
Democratic	Joanne C. Benson (incumbent)	15,086	33.6
Democratic	Nathaniel Exum (incumbent)	15,057	33.6
Democratic	Carolyn J. B. Howard (incumbent)	14,708	32.8
Democratic win (new boundaries)			
Democratic win (new boundaries)			
Democratic win (new boundaries)			

=== District 25 ===
Maryland House of Delegates District 25 election
Party	Candidate	Votes	%
Democratic	Brenda Bethea Hughes (incumbent)	14,728	33.8
Democratic	Dereck E. Davis	14,509	33.3
Democratic	Michael A. Crumlin	14,281	32.8
Democratic win (new boundaries)			
Democratic win (new boundaries)			
Democratic win (new boundaries)			

=== District 26 ===
Maryland House of Delegates District 26 election
Party	Candidate	Votes	%
Democratic	C. Anthony Muse	17,807	27.3
Democratic	David Mercado Valderrama (incumbent)	17,206	26.4
Democratic	Obie Patterson	16,483	25.3
Republican	Max L. Buff	4,814	7.4
Republican	Claude W. Roxborough	4,612	7.1
Republican	Erich H. Schmidt	4,215	6.5
Democratic win (new boundaries)			
Democratic win (new boundaries)			
Democratic win (new boundaries)			

=== District 27A ===
Maryland House of Delegates District 27A election
Party	Candidate	Votes	%
Democratic	Joseph F. Vallario Jr. (incumbent)	14,434	35.8
Democratic	James E. Proctor Jr.	13,747	34.1
Republican	James A. Woods	6,703	16.6
Republican	Elmer L. Smith	5,413	13.4
Democratic win (new boundaries)			
Democratic win (new boundaries)			

=== District 27B ===
Maryland House of Delegates District 27B election
Party	Candidate	Votes	%
Democratic	George W. Owings III	7,037	61.6
Republican	Edward B. Finch	4,383	38.4
Democratic win (new boundaries)			

=== District 28 ===
Maryland House of Delegates District 28 election
Party	Candidate	Votes	%
Democratic	Van Mitchell	12,289	17.9
Democratic	Samuel C. Linton	11,993	17.5
Democratic	Thomas E. Hutchins	11,507	16.8
Republican	Gerald Schuster	11,416	16.6
Democratic	Ruth Ann Hall	11,176	16.3
Republican	Adam M. O'Kelley	10,295	15.0
Democratic win (new boundaries)			
Democratic win (new boundaries)			
Democratic win (new boundaries)			

=== District 29A ===
Maryland House of Delegates District 29A election
Party	Candidate	Votes	%
Democratic	John F. Wood Jr. (incumbent)	5,739	100.0
Democratic win (new boundaries)			

=== District 29B ===
Maryland House of Delegates District 29B election
Party	Candidate	Votes	%
Republican	John F. Slade III	5,228	62.9
Republican	Donald Lee O'Neal	3,083	37.1
Republican win (new boundaries)			

=== District 29C ===
Maryland House of Delegates District 29C election
Party	Candidate	Votes	%
Republican	Tony O'Donnell	5,839	50.1
Democratic	Thomas Michael Pelagatti	5,807	49.9
Republican win (new boundaries)			

=== District 30 ===
Maryland House of Delegates District 30 election
Party	Candidate	Votes	%
Democratic	Michael E. Busch (incumbent)	18,709	18.5
Republican	Phillip D. Bissett (incumbent)	18,330	18.2
Democratic	Virginia P. Clagett	18,254	18.1
Republican	Ralph C. Rocky Rosacker	16,299	16.2
Republican	Joan Beck	15,974	15.8
Democratic	John C. Eldridge Jr.	13,320	13.2
Democratic win (new boundaries)			
Republican win (new boundaries)			
Democratic win (new boundaries)			

=== District 31 ===
Maryland House of Delegates District 31 election
Party	Candidate	Votes	%
Republican	John R. Leopold	19,960	24.3
Democratic	Joan Cadden (incumbent)	16,492	20.1
Republican	Victoria L. Schade	14,801	18.0
Democratic	W. Ray Huff (incumbent)	14,203	17.3
Democratic	C. Stokes Kolodziejski (incumbent)	13,176	16.0
Republican	Douglas Arnold	3,586	4.4
Republican win (new boundaries)			
Democratic win (new boundaries)			
Republican win (new boundaries)			

=== District 32 ===
Maryland House of Delegates District 32 election
Party	Candidate	Votes	%
Republican	James E. Rzepkowski	15,147	20.1
Republican	Michael W. Burns	12,883	17.1
Democratic	Mary Ann Love (incumbent)	12,414	16.4
Republican	Gerald P. Starr	12,166	16.1
Democratic	Victor Sulin (incumbent)	11,872	15.7
Democratic	Thomas H. Dixon III	11,002	14.6
Republican win (new boundaries)			
Republican win (new boundaries)			
Democratic win (new boundaries)			

=== District 33 ===
Maryland House of Delegates District 33 election
Party	Candidate	Votes	%
Republican	Robert C. Baldwin (incumbent)	19,628	19.9
Republican	Janet Greenip	19,545	19.8
Democratic	Marsha G. Perry (incumbent)	17,618	17.8
Republican	David Almy	16,390	16.6
Democratic	David G. Boschert	13,485	13.6
Democratic	Michael F. Canning	12,157	12.3
Republican win (new boundaries)			
Republican win (new boundaries)			
Republican win (new boundaries)			

=== District 34 ===
Maryland House of Delegates District 34 election
Party	Candidate	Votes	%
Republican	Nancy Jacobs	18,091	20.1
Democratic	Rose Mary Hatem Bonsack (incumbent)	17,762	19.7
Democratic	Mary Louise Preis (incumbent)	17,380	19.3
Democratic	B. Daniel Riley	13,891	15.4
Republican	Scott Williams	12,362	13.7
Republican	Kenneth A. Thompson	10,576	11.7
Republican win (new boundaries)			
Democratic win (new boundaries)			
Democratic win (new boundaries)			

=== District 35A ===
Maryland House of Delegates District 35A election
Party	Candidate	Votes	%
Republican	James M. Harkins (incumbent)	18,655	36.3
Democratic	Donald C. Fry (incumbent)	14,458	28.1
Republican	James F. Greenwell	10,443	20.3
Democratic	Joseph Lutz	7,858	15.3
Republican win (new boundaries)			
Democratic win (new boundaries)			

=== District 35B ===
Maryland House of Delegates District 35B election
Party	Candidate	Votes	%
Democratic	David D. Rudolph	4,175	50.7
Republican	Robert H. Ward	2,450	29.8
Democratic	Ethel Ann Murray (incumbent)	1,610	19.6
Democratic win (new boundaries)			

=== District 36 ===
Maryland House of Delegates District 36 election
Party	Candidate	Votes	%
Democratic	Ronald A. Guns (incumbent)	14,915	19.5
Democratic	Wheeler R. Baker	13,911	18.2
Republican	Mary Roe Walkup	13,589	17.8
Democratic	W. Michael Newnam (incumbent)	11,874	15.5
Republican	Sharon Maenner Carrick	11,350	14.8
Republican	Allaire D. Williams	10,796	14.1
Democratic win (new boundaries)			
Democratic win (new boundaries)			
Republican win (new boundaries)			

=== District 37A ===
Maryland House of Delegates District 37A election
Party	Candidate	Votes	%
Republican	Don B. Hughes	2,788	40.7
Democratic	Rudolph C. Cane	2,768	40.4
Independent	Lemuel D. Chester II	1,299	18.9
Republican win (new boundaries)			

=== District 37B ===
Maryland House of Delegates District 37B election
Party	Candidate	Votes	%
Republican	Kenneth D. Schisler (incumbent)	14,992	35.5
Republican	Adelaide C. Eckardt	11,422	27.0
Democratic	Robert Alan Thornton Jr. (incumbent)	9,240	21.9
Democratic	Philip Carey Foster	6,618	15.7
Republican win (new boundaries)			
Republican win (new boundaries)			

=== District 38 ===
Maryland House of Delegates District 38 election
Party	Candidate	Votes	%
Democratic	Bennett Bozman (incumbent)	19,702	22.0
Democratic	Norman Conway (incumbent)	17,593	19.7
Republican	Charles A. McClenahan (incumbent)	16,700	18.7
Democratic	Charles A. Bruce Jr.	12,591	14.1
Republican	Christopher E. Mills	12,296	13.7
Republican	Ronald L. Bireley	10,570	11.8
Democratic win (new boundaries)			
Democratic win (new boundaries)			
Republican win (new boundaries)			

=== District 39 ===
Maryland House of Delegates District 39 election
Party	Candidate	Votes	%
Republican	Mathew Mossburg	13,119	16.6
Republican	Barrie Ciliberti	12,897	16.4
Republican	W. Raymond Beck	12,311	15.6
Democratic	Charles E. Barkley	12,137	15.4
Democratic	Anise Key Brown	10,987	13.9
Democratic	Anthony J. Santangelo	10,939	13.9
Independent	Patricia Cummings	6,471	8.2
Republican win (new boundaries)			
Republican win (new boundaries)			
Republican win (new boundaries)			

=== District 40 ===
Maryland House of Delegates District 40 election
Party	Candidate	Votes	%
Democratic	Tony Fulton (incumbent)	13,700	32.9
Democratic	Pete Rawlings (incumbent)	13,694	32.9
Democratic	Salima Siler Marriott (incumbent)	13,013	31.3
Democratic	Robert L. Clay	1,216	2.9
Democratic win (new boundaries)			
Democratic win (new boundaries)			
Democratic win (new boundaries)			

=== District 41 ===
Maryland House of Delegates District 41 election
Party	Candidate	Votes	%
Democratic	Margaret H. Murphy (incumbent)	15,114	31.0
Democratic	Frank Boston (incumbent)	14,491	29.8
Democratic	Nathaniel T. Oaks	13,702	28.1
Republican	Edward J. Eagan	2,338	4.8
Republican	Harry E. Grant	1,529	3.1
Republican	Daniel S. O'Shea	1,504	3.1
Democratic win (new boundaries)			
Democratic win (new boundaries)			
Democratic win (new boundaries)			

=== District 42 ===
Maryland House of Delegates District 42 election
Party	Candidate	Votes	%
Democratic	Samuel I. Rosenberg (incumbent)	22,464	35.0
Democratic	James W. Campbell (incumbent)	20,944	32.6
Democratic	Maggie McIntosh (incumbent)	20,840	32.4
Democratic win (new boundaries)			
Democratic win (new boundaries)			
Democratic win (new boundaries)			

=== District 43 ===
Maryland House of Delegates District 43 election
Party	Candidate	Votes	%
Democratic	Gerald Curran (incumbent)	17,779	35.1
Democratic	Ann Marie Doory (incumbent)	16,509	32.6
Democratic	Kenneth C. Montague Jr. (incumbent)	16,384	32.3
Democratic win (new boundaries)			
Democratic win (new boundaries)			
Democratic win (new boundaries)			

=== District 44 ===
Maryland House of Delegates District 44 election
Party	Candidate	Votes	%
Democratic	Clarence Mitchell IV	9,838	33.9
Democratic	Elijah Cummings (incumbent)	9,823	33.9
Democratic	Ruth M. Kirk (incumbent)	9,358	32.2
Democratic win (new boundaries)			
Democratic win (new boundaries)			
Democratic win (new boundaries)			

=== District 45 ===
Maryland House of Delegates District 45 election
Party	Candidate	Votes	%
Democratic	Hattie N. Harrison (incumbent)	11,119	48.4
Democratic	Talmadge Branch	10,728	46.7
Democratic	Clarence "Tiger" Davis (incumbent)	1,120	4.9
Democratic win (new boundaries)			
Democratic win (new boundaries)			
Democratic win (new boundaries)			

=== District 46 ===
Maryland House of Delegates District 46 election
Party	Candidate	Votes	%
Democratic	Cornell N. Dypski (incumbent)	13,355	30.5
Democratic	Carolyn J. Krysiak (incumbent)	13,001	29.7
Democratic	Peter A. Hammen	12,528	28.7
Republican	Mark C. Miller	4,832	11.1
Democratic win (new boundaries)			
Democratic win (new boundaries)			
Democratic win (new boundaries)			

=== District 47A ===
Maryland House of Delegates District 47A election
Party	Candidate	Votes	%
Democratic	Timothy D. Murphy	8,709	46.1
Democratic	Brian K. McHale (incumbent)	8,154	43.2
Democratic	Gary E. Morse	2,004	10.6
Republican	Anthony F. Forlenza	6	0.0
Democratic win (new boundaries)			
Democratic win (new boundaries)			

=== District 47B ===
Maryland House of Delegates District 47B election
Party	Candidate	Votes	%
Democratic	Thomas E. Dewberry (incumbent)	6,280	58.2
Republican	Steven Cumby	4,509	41.8
Democratic win (new boundaries)			
