= Bryan Simonaire =

American politician (born 1963)

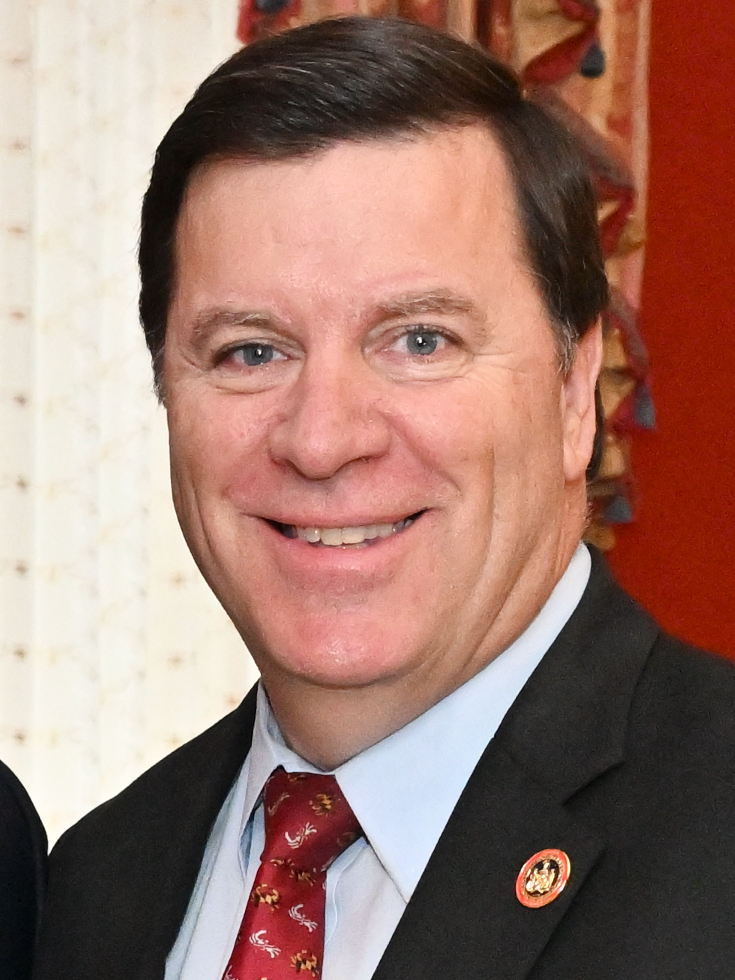

Minority Leader of the Maryland Senate
- In office October 10, 2020 – January 11, 2023
- Whip: Justin Ready
- Preceded by: J. B. Jennings
- Succeeded by: Steve Hershey

Member of the Maryland Senate from the 31st district
- Incumbent
- Assumed office January 10, 2007
- Preceded by: Philip C. Jimeno

Personal details
- Born: Bryan Warner Simonaire; September 6, 1963 (age 62) Baltimore, Maryland, U.S.
- Party: Republican
- Children: 7, including Meagan
- Education: Bob Jones University (BS); Loyola University Maryland (MS)
- Occupation: Computer systems engineer

Bryan Warner Simonaire (born September 6, 1963) is an American politician who serves as a Maryland state senator representing District 31, which encompasses much of northern Anne Arundel County's Baltimore suburbs. A member of the Republican Party, he served as the minority leader of the Maryland Senate from 2020 to 2023.

Born in Baltimore, Simonaire graduated from Bob Jones University and Loyola University Maryland, afterwards working as a computer systems engineer for Westinghouse Electronic Systems. He was elected to the Maryland Senate in 2006, defeating Democratic state delegate Walter Shandrowsky in the general election. He was subsequently re-elected in 2010, 2014, 2018, and 2022. From 2020 to 2023, Simonaire served as minority leader of the Maryland Senate, during which the Republican Party lost two state senate seats in the 2022 elections.

== Background ==
Simonaire was born in Baltimore. He graduated from Bob Jones University in 1985, receiving a Bachelor of Science degree in computer science, and from Loyola College, where he earned a Master of Science degree in engineering in 2005. He is a member of Upsilon Pi Epsilon.

After graduating from BJU, Simonaire worked as a computer systems engineer for Westinghouse Electronic Systems (now Northrop Grumman since its acquisition in 1995), during which he spent about 10 years living in the Middle East and Central America working alongside members of the military. In 2002, Simonaire founded Heroes-at-Home, a web-based program that helps the needy.

Simonaire became involved in politics in 2005, when he joined the North County Republican Club's board of directors. He entered the race for state Senate in District 31 later that year, seeking to succeed retiring Democratic state senator Philip C. Jimeno and running on a "common sense, conservative" platform that included opposition to same-sex marriage. The district was targeted by the Maryland Republican Party, which saw the election as an opportunity to make legislative gains. Simonaire won the Republican primary in September 2006, and later won the general election on November 7, 2006, defeating Democratic state delegate Walter J. Shandrowsky by 659 votes, or a margin of 1.72 percent. It was the closest election in the 2006 Maryland Senate elections.

== In the legislature ==
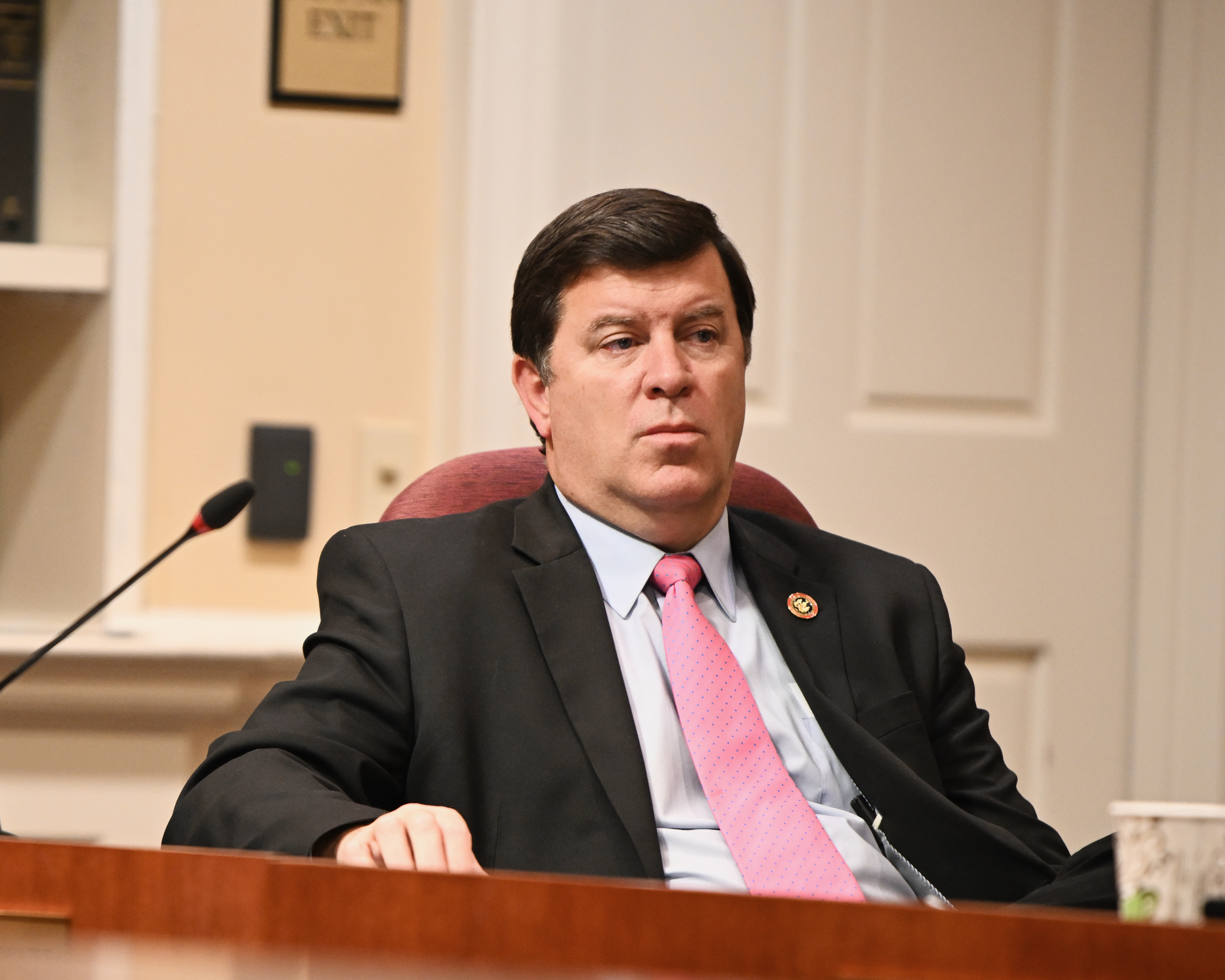
Simonaire in the Education, Energy, and the Environment Committee, 2023

Simonaire was sworn into the Maryland Senate on January 10, 2007. He was initially a member of the Judicial Proceedings Committee from 2007 to 2010, afterwards serving on the Health and Environmental Affairs Committee until 2022. From 2023 to 2027, he served on the Education, Energy, and the Environment Committee.

Simonaire endorsed Mitt Romney in the 2012 Republican Party presidential primaries and later served a Romney delegate to the 2012 Republican National Convention.

In 2014, Simonaire proposed a constitutional amendment to remove legislative leaders' ability to remove voting powers from any member of the Maryland General Assembly. The amendment was introduced after state Delegate Don H. Dwyer Jr. was stripped of his voting powers and committee assignments after being sentenced to 30 weekends in jail for driving under the influence. In 2016, Simonaire introduced the "Dwyer amendment", which would have prevented Senate president Thomas V. Miller Jr. from removing a member's voting powers. The proposed rule change was rejected in a 11-31 vote.

In October 2020, Simonaire was elected as the minority leader of the Maryland Senate, which was seen by the media as the Senate Republican caucus becoming more conservative as to push back on the perceived leftward shift of the Maryland Democratic Party following the election of Bill Ferguson as Senate president. In this capacity, Simonaire sought to allow his party to make their own committee assignments and oversaw the party's state Senate campaign in 2022, in which the party lost two seats in the Maryland Senate. Following the 2022 elections, Senate Republicans opted to elect Steve Hershey as minority leader.

Simonaire endorsed Maryland Secretary of Commerce Kelly M. Schulz in the 2022 Maryland gubernatorial election. After she was defeated by far-right state delegate Dan Cox in the Republican primary, he declined to endorse or campaign with Cox, instead focusing on competitive Senate elections.

On March 25, 2025, Simonaire announced that he would not seek re-election to a sixth term in 2026, shortly after endorsing state delegate Nic Kipke to succeed him. After leaving office, he plans to continue working as an engineer for Northrop Grumman.

== Political positions ==
During his tenure in the Maryland Senate, Simonaire described himself as a social conservative who was more moderate on certain issues, such as protecting waterways, and would vote for Democratic bills if he thought they would benefit his district.

=== Crime and justice ===
In 2009, Simonaire said he would vote to repeal the death penalty if legislators passed a constitutional amendment to ban same-sex marriage in Maryland. He later voted for an amendment to the death penalty repeal bill to limit the death penalty's use rather than fully repeal it, which passed 25-21. During the 2013 legislative session, Simonaire voted against repealing the death penalty.

During the 2022 legislative session, Simonaire implored legislators to pass a tough-on-crime bill introduced by Governor Larry Hogan. He also expressed willingness to work with Democrats to pass a bipartisan judicial transparency bill.

=== Education ===
Simonaire opposes the Blueprint for Maryland's Future, calling for its repeal during the 2021 legislative session and comparing them to the Bridge of Excellence education reforms in 2002. He supports legislation requiring the Maryland State Board of Education to prepare a problem gambling curriculum in schools.

During the 2011 legislative session, Simonaire said he opposed Maryland's Dream Act, a bill that extended in-state tuition for undocumented immigrants.

During the 2022 legislative session, Simonaire introduced a bill that would force the county Board of Education to vote on certain curriculum items if a petition got the signatures of at least three percent of parents.

=== Electoral reform ===
During the 2015 legislative session, Simonaire testified against a bill to restore voting rights for ex-felons.

In May 2020, Simonaire asked Governor Larry Hogan to call a special session to pass election integrity bills, expressing concern that the use of mail-in ballots in the 2020 elections would lead to voter fraud.

During the 2021 legislative session, Simonaire introduced a package of election reform bills, including voter ID laws and signature verification on mail-in ballots, citing what he called "major deficiencies" in the 2020 United States presidential election. The package failed to move out of committee, and many bills from the package were reintroduced in 2022. He also supported a bill to shift control of local election boards to whichever party had a majority of registered voters in each jurisdiction, and sought to amend a bill to expand early voting centers to require local boards of elections to consider "geographical distance" in deciding where to locate early voting centers.

Simonaire opposed the congressional maps drawn by the Legislative Redistricting Advisory Committee (LRAC), of which he was a member, instead supporting maps drawn by Governor Larry Hogan's Maryland Citizens Redistricting Commission. During the LRAC's map drawing process, he pressed for a bipartisan map drawing process and hoped legislators would produce a single map, but predicted that Democrats on the commission would pass their own map. He criticized the commission's final congressional and legislative maps as "seriously gerrymandered". After Judge Lynne A. Battaglia struck down the state's congressional maps in March 2022, Simonaire criticized Democrats for not including Republicans in the process of drafting a new map.

In July 2026, Simonaire published an attack ad against Question 3, referring to the proposed constitutional amendment was the "Maryland's Voter Suppression Act of 2026".

=== Environment ===
Simonaire is an environmentalist and has expressed willingness to work with legislators to pass a bipartisan climate bill. He voted in favor of bills to ban fracking and foam containers in Maryland.

Simonaire was critical of Maryland's "Rain Tax" and introduced legislation in 2013 to offset the fee in Anne Arundel County. In 2015, he voted in favor of a bill to make the rain tax optional for Maryland's largest jurisdictions.

During the 2021 legislative session, Simonaire expressed concern with the Climate Solutions Now Act, which he said would force jurisdictions to choose between planting more trees and protecting local sewage projects. After it was reintroduced in 2022, he objected to provisions that would require large buildings to become carbon neutral by 2040 and expressed that legislators should instead focus on climate solutions "starting at the regional level".

During the 2026 legislative session, Simonaire was the only Republican state senator to vote for the Utility RELIEF Act, an omnibus energy bill introduced by Governor Wes Moore and Democratic legislative leaders.

=== Gun policy ===
During the 2013 legislative session, Simonaire voted against the Firearms Safety Act, a bill that placed restrictions on firearm purchases and magazine capacity in semi-automatic rifles.

=== Immigration ===
In January 2026, following a series of U.S. Immigration and Customs Enforcement (ICE) activities in Annapolis, Simonaire said that he "fully" supports ICE and that we "have a problem in America where we've let too many illegal immigrants into our country".

=== Social issues ===
Simonaire opposes abortion rights and same-sex marriage, citing his religious beliefs.

Simonaire opposed the Civil Marriage Protection Act, reading King & King on the Senate floor to protest the bill and warning that "young, impressionable students" would be taught the "homosexual worldview" if the bill passed. He also unsuccessfully sought to amend the bill to allow religious adoption agencies to refuse services to same-sex couples. In 2015, he voted against a bill that would allow same-sex couples to use donor sperm for in vitro fertilization.

In 2014, Simonaire said he opposed a bill to prohibit discrimination against transgender people. In 2021, he was the lone vote against a bill to allow transgender people to change their names without advertising it in newspapers.

In 2015, Simonaire introduced a "right to try" bill that would allow terminally ill patients to try experimental drugs not approved by the Food and Drug Administration. In 2019, he spoke against the End-of-Life Option Act, which would have provided palliative care to terminally ill adults.

During the 2016 legislative session, Simonaire introduced legislation to revise a translation of the state's motto to "Strong deeds, gentle words", saying that he believed that the current meaning of the motto ("Manly deeds, womanly words") was sexist.

In 2022, Simonaire downplayed the impact of the U.S. Supreme Court's decision in Dobbs v. Jackson Women's Health Organization, which overturned Roe v. Wade, calling it a "Democratic ploy" to energize voters. In 2023, during debate on a bill creating a ballot referendum to codify abortion access rights into the Constitution of Maryland, Simonaire compared abortion to the death penalty and sought to amend the bill to prohibit abortions after fetal viability, which failed by a vote of 13-33.

=== Taxes ===
In 2013, Simonaire said he opposed a bill to provide $450,000 in tax breaks to Lockheed Martin.

In 2021, Simonaire spoke against legislation to extend the state's earned income tax credit to undocumented immigrants. He also opposed legislation to allow counties to implement progressive income taxes and to impose a tax on digital advertising, and unsuccessfully attempted to amend the tax bill to prevent large companies from increasing prices for consumers or small businesses to pay for the tax.

During the 2022 legislative session, Simonaire supported a bill to cut taxes on centenarians and implored legislators to pass additional tax cuts.

=== Transportation ===
In March 2024, following the Francis Scott Key Bridge collapse, Simonaire and state senator Johnny Ray Salling introduced a bill that would allow the governor to declare a year-long state of emergency after damage to critical infrastructure, though it would eliminate the authority to seize private property for government use, as now allowed under a state of emergency. The bill was withdrawn following discussions with the Moore administration.

== Personal life ==
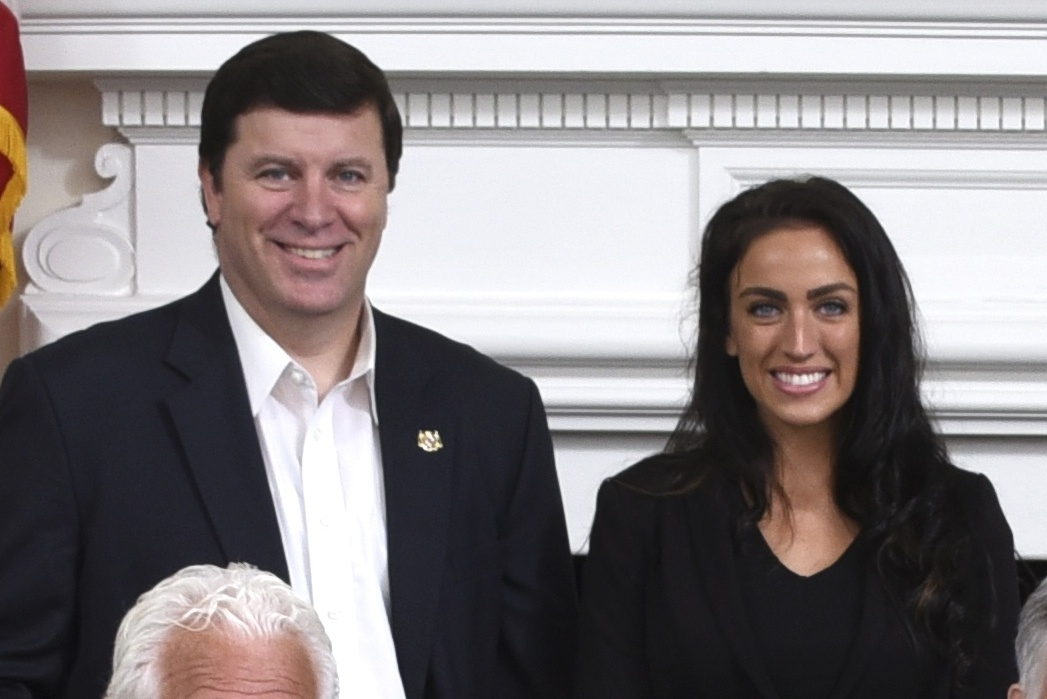
Bryan and Meagan Simonaire, 2015

Simonaire is married and has seven children. He lives in Pasadena, Maryland, and attends nondenominational Christian churches.

During the 2018 legislative session, Simonaire spoke against a bill to ban conversion therapy on minors, arguing that it would dissuade teens from seeking counseling. His daughter, Meagan, a member of the Maryland House of Delegates, spoke in support of the bill and accused her father of seeking conversion therapy for her after she came out as bisexual in 2015. Simonaire disputed his daughter's story in interviews with the media, saying that he had recommended her Christian counseling after she approached him for advice with her depression and anxiety, but added that he disagreed with her "lifestyle". In April 2026, Simonaire supported the U.S. Supreme Court's decision in Chiles v. Salazar, saying that it "vindicated" his position on conversion therapy bans.

== Electoral history ==
Maryland Senate District 31 Republican primary election, 2006
Party	Candidate	Votes	%
Republican	Bryan Simonaire	3,032	42.0
Republican	Carl G. "Dutch" Holland	1,620	22.4
Republican	Mike Jacobs	1,533	21.2
Republican	Thomas R. Gardner	821	11.4
Republican	Charles "Casey" Robison	218	3.0

Maryland Senate District 31 election, 2006
Party	Candidate	Votes	%
Republican	Bryan Simonaire	19,516	50.8
Democratic	Walter J. Shandrowsky	18,857	49.1
Write-in		28	0.1
Republican gain from Democratic			

Maryland Senate District 31 election, 2010
Party	Candidate	Votes	%
Republican	Bryan Simonaire (incumbent)	25,744	62.1
Democratic	Ned Carey	15,688	37.8
Write-in		35	0.1
Republican hold			

Maryland Senate District 31 election, 2014
Party	Candidate	Votes	%
Republican	Bryan Simonaire (incumbent)	28,338	72.1
Democratic	Anthony Scott Harman	10,929	27.8
Write-in		34	0.1
Republican hold			

Maryland Senate District 31 election, 2018
Party	Candidate	Votes	%
Republican	Bryan Simonaire (incumbent)	29,489	61.0
Democratic	Scott Harman	18,778	38.9
Write-in		61	0.1
Republican hold			

Maryland Senate District 31 election, 2022
Party	Candidate	Votes	%
Republican	Bryan Simonaire (incumbent)	32,215	71.3
Libertarian	Brian W. Kunkoski	12,318	27.2
Write-in		681	1.5
Republican hold			

Maryland Senate
Preceded by J. B. Jennings	Minority Leader of the Maryland Senate; 2020–2023	Succeeded by Steve Hershey
