= Nic Kipke =

American politician (born 1979)

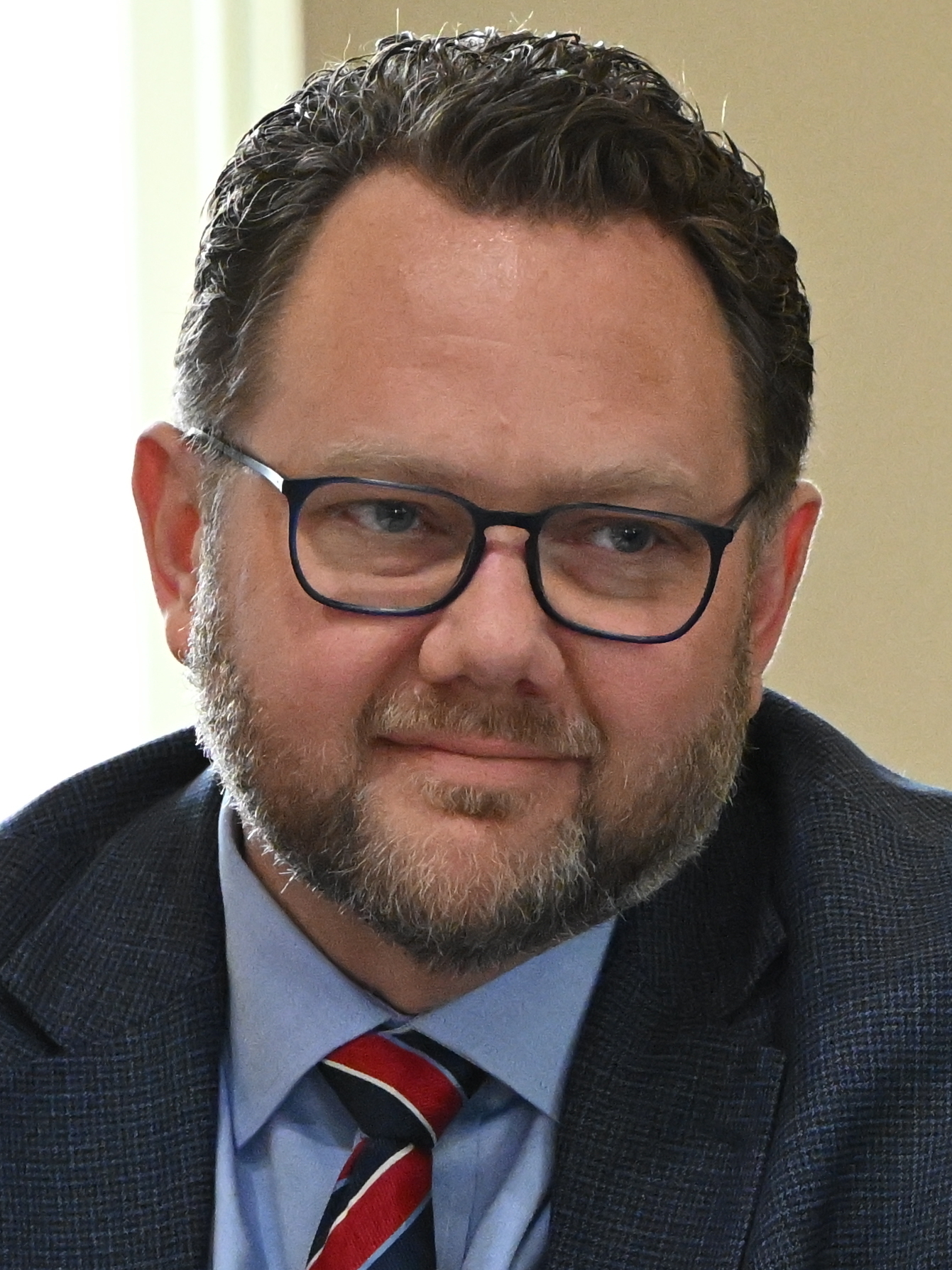
- Kipke in 2026

Member-elect of the Maryland Senate from the 31st district
- Assuming office January 13, 2027
- Succeeding: Bryan Simonaire

Minority Leader of the Maryland House of Delegates
- In office May 1, 2013 – April 13, 2021
- Whip: Kathy Szeliga
- Preceded by: Tony O'Donnell
- Succeeded by: Jason Buckel

Member of the Maryland House of Delegates
- Incumbent
- Assumed office January 10, 2007
- Preceded by: John R. Leopold; Joan Cadden
- Constituency: District 31 (2007–2015; 2023–present); District 31B (2015–2023)

Personal details
- Born: Nicholaus Ryan Kipke; January 26, 1979 (age 47) Baltimore, Maryland, U.S.
- Party: Republican
- Spouse(s): Morgan Uebersax (div. 2012) Susannah Warner
- Children: 3
- Education: Anne Arundel Community College
- Website: www.kipke.com

Nicholaus Ryan Kipke (born January 26, 1979) is an American politician who is a member-elect of the Maryland Senate from District 31. A member of the Republican Party, he has represented District 31 in the Maryland House of Delegates since 2007.

Born in Baltimore and raised in Pasadena, Maryland, Kipke gradauted from Anne Arundel Community College, afterwards wroking as a restaurant manager for FriendCo Restaurants and a manufacturer representative for REPS & Associates, Inc. He was elected to the Maryland House of Delegates in 2006 and reelected in 2010, 2014, 2018, and 2022. From 2013 to 2021, Kipke served as the minority leader of the House of Delegates.

Kipke was elected to the Maryland Senate in 2026.

== Background ==
Kipke was born in Baltimore to father Ken Kipke. He graduated from Chesapeake High School and later attended Anne Arundel Community College.

After attending school and college, Kipke worked as a restaurant manager for FriendCo Restaurants until 2000, when he became a manufacturer representative for REPS & Associates, Inc.

== In the legislature ==
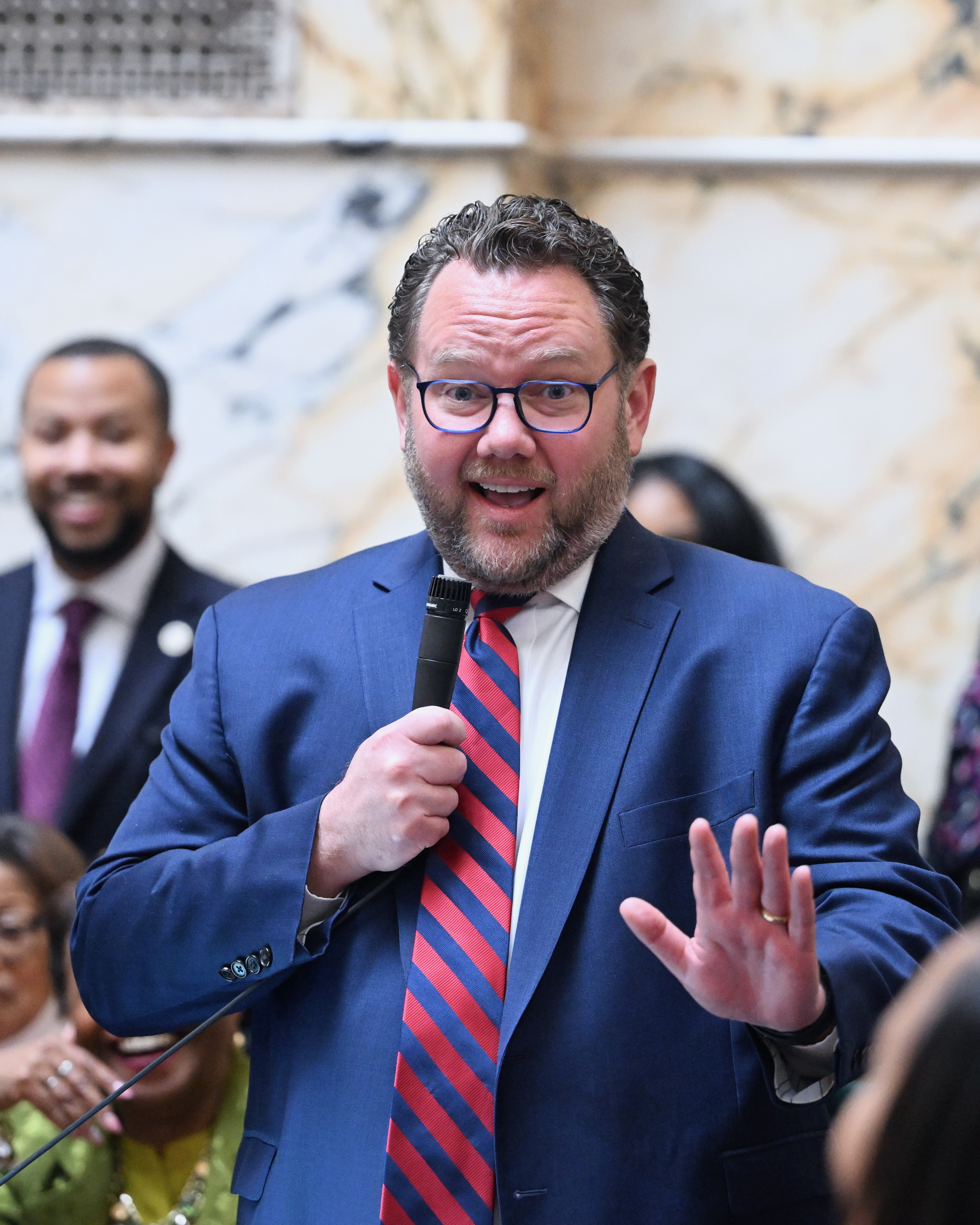
Kipke speaks on the floor of the Maryland House of Delegates, 2026

Kipke was sworn into the Maryland House of Delegates on January 10, 2007. He represented District 31 from 2007 to 2015 and again since 2023, and District 31B from 2015 to 2023. He served as a member of the Health and Government Operations Committee during his entire tenure.

In December 2008, following an unexpected drop in state revenues, Governor Martin O'Malley ordered a furlough for state employees. Kipke voluntarily participated in the state employee furlough later that month. The constitutionality of doing this was unclear, as the Constitution of Maryland prohibits the state government from furloughing state legislators.

In May 2013, Kipke was elected Minority Leader, unseating Tony O'Donnell. He stepped down as minority leader in April 2021, saying that he would focus on upcoming elections in Anne Arundel County. Kipke chaired the exploratory committee for Anne Arundel County councilmember Jessica Haire's 2022 Anne Arundel County executive campaign, later endorsing her candidacy in June 2021.

=== 2023 sine die adjournment ===
On April 10, 2023, less than 10 minutes before the legislature adjourned sine die, House Speaker Adrienne A. Jones sought to move onto the next bill after Minority Leader Jason C. Buckel had explained his vote on House Bill 1071. After a series of other Republican lawmakers began making appeals to also explain their votes, which were rejected by Jones, Kipke began shouting "I challenge the rule of the speaker" and called on someone else to take over proceedings for the rest of the legislative session, followed later with "Madame Speaker, you need to have a seat". Jones had limited the process of delegates explaining their vote given the short amount of time they had left in the legislative session. Kipke was soon joined by a handful of other Republican state delegates, who began quoting the chamber's rule book and speaking over Jones, who responded, "Speaker's discretion. And that is what my discretion is". This continued until the legislature adjourned sine die at midnight, preventing several bills from receiving a final vote before the deadline. The Legislative Black Caucus of Maryland demanded "a [public] apology for the disrespect" shown to Jones following this shouting match. Kipke told The Baltimore Banner the next day that he had "nothing to apologize for", but later said that he called Jones to apologize for his tone.

=== Maryland Senate ===
On March 25, 2025, Kipke announced that he would seek election to the Maryland Senate in 2026 to replace retiring state senator Bryan Simonaire, who endorsed his candidacy. Kipke defeated Democratic challenger Brent Mulrooney in the general election on November 3, 2026.

Kipke will be sworn in on January 13, 2027. He will be a member of the Senate Judicial Proceedings Committee.

== Political positions ==
=== COVID-19 pandemic ===
In April 2020, Kipke wrote a letter to Governor Larry Hogan calling on him to lift the state's ban on outdoor activities, which were put into place to slow the spread of COVID-19. He also co-signed a letter to the Maryland Department of Public Safety and Correctional Services to request more information about the 2,000 inmates released from custody at the beginning of the COVID-19 pandemic.

In August 2020, Kipke defended Hogan's decision to restrict counties from issuing restrictions on in-person instruction, saying "Every public school administration in the state has been given the opportunity to make a decision on reopening, the same opportunity should be afforded to private and religious schools". He later supported Hogan's calls in January 2021 to reopen schools by March 1, calling it the House of Delegates Republican Caucus's "number one priority". Kipke also wrote to Chief Judge Mary Ellen Barbera to request an update on the reopening of the state's courts.

During the 2021 legislative session, he said he supported the Hogan administration's RELIEF Act, a $1 billion coronavirus relief package that included stimulus checks and tax cuts for lower-income Marylanders and businesses.

=== Crime and policing ===
During the 2019 legislative session, Kipke introduced a bill that would strengthen sentences for murder convictions and repeat violent offenders to 10-year periods. In 2020, he introduced a bill that would require local governments to comply with U.S. Immigration and Customs Enforcement requests to detain individuals for an additional 48 hours.

In April 2021, Kipke was one of two House Republicans to vote in favor of the Maryland Police Accountability Act of 2021, a police transparency and accountability reform package.

During the 2023 legislative session and following a 12-year-old bringing a loaded gun to school in January 2023, Kipke introduced a bill that would allow 10 and 12 year olds to be charged with gun crimes.

=== Development initiatives ===
In 2014, Kipke said he supported a bill that would cut off the National Security Agency from using the state's water and electricity infrastructure. He withdrew his support from the bill after U.S. Representative Dutch Ruppersberger criticized the bill. Kipke later said in December 2018 that he had signed onto the bill while rushing to a meeting and only discovered later what the bill proposed.

In January 2016, Kipke said he supported Governor Larry Hogan's Project C.O.R.E. program, a $700 million plan to demolish and redevelop vacant homes in poorer areas of Baltimore.

=== Education ===
In February 2017, Kipke said he opposed a Baltimore City Public Schools request for $65 million to shrink a $130 million budget deficit and avoid laying off more than 1,000 workers, calling it a "problem with management" and saying he would not support the request unless the school system developed a plan to fix its budgetary issues.

In March 2017, Kipke voted against a bill that would limit suspensions and expulsions for elementary school students, speaking out against provisions that he said would "eliminate required parental involvement".

In March 2018, Kipke defended Governor Larry Hogan's decision to tie school safety funding to casino revenues, telling its critics to "check the partisanship at the door". In 2019, he introduced a bill that would allow school systems to establish a "special police officer program" to patrol school buildings.

During the 2020 legislative session, Kipke introduced an amendment to the Blueprint for Maryland's Future that would eliminate the education reform bill's spending mandates if its proposed programs did not improve student performance after three years. The amendment was rejected by the Maryland House of Delegates. He later criticized the Blueprint bill for not including any specific funding, which provided through other bills passed that year that Kipke further criticized as a burden to Maryland residents and businesses. In May 2020, Kipke co-signed a letter to Hogan asking him to veto the Blueprint bill, citing the economic impact of the COVID-19 pandemic.

In April 2023, Kipke sent a letter to State Superintendent Mohammed Choudhury accusing the Maryland State Department of Education of hiding scores from failing scores by altering data files available on the department's website. An investigation conducted by the state inspector general found no evidence of these claims.

=== Gun policy ===
In 2019, Kipke proposed an amendment on a bill requiring background checks for long gun sales to ban 3D printed guns, which was rejected by the Maryland House of Delegates by a 47-85 vote. In 2020, he criticized a bill that would require background checks for shotgun and rifle transfers, saying it would "not do anything to protect Marylanders from gun violence".

=== Marijuana ===
In 2016, Kipke voted to sustain Hogan's veto on a bill to decriminalize marijuana paraphernalia.

=== Minimum wage ===
In March 2019, Kipke said he opposed a bill that would raise the state's minimum wage to $15 by 2025, arguing it would damage small businesses.

=== National politics ===
In 2008, Kipke ran for delegate to the Republican National Convention in Maryland's 1st congressional district, pledged to former New York mayor Rudy Giuliani. In 2012, Kipke served as a delegate to the Republican National Convention, pledged to former Massachusetts governor Mitt Romney.

In November 2020, Kipke defended President Donald Trump's false claims of 2020 election fraud, writing in an email to Maryland Matters:

I think everyone should take a deep breath. The President has the right to challenge the results and there is a legal process for that. At the same time, Senator Biden has the right to think he has won. In due time we all will know who won and I encourage everyone to be respectful of people on both sides. If Biden wins, I'm going to pray that he does a good job as President and leads as a centrist and not allow the far left to dominate his policies. I don't know if there was election fraud but if there was it should be investigated. All legal votes must be counted.

In January 2021, Kipke condemned the January 6 United States Capitol attack and urged Republicans upset by the results of the 2020 presidential election to "understand that we are the party of law and order".

=== Redistricting ===
During the 2019 legislative session, Kipke introduced a bill that would add an amendment to the Constitution of Maryland requiring the Maryland House of Delegates adopt single-member districts, eliminating its multi-member districts. He also co-sponsored a bill that would require Maryland's congressional and legislative district maps to be drawn using an independent redistricting commission.

In February 2022, Kipke was one of three Republican state delegates to join a Fair Maps Maryland lawsuit against the state's new legislative redistricting map, later calling Anne Arundel County's districts "illegally gerrymandered". The Maryland Court of Appeals ruled 4-3 against the plaintiffs in April 2022.

In August 2026, during debate on a proposed constitutional amendment on redistricting, Kipke introduced an amendment that would require Maryland to use an independent redistricting commission to draw it congressional and legislative maps.

=== Social issues ===
In 2015, Kipke voted in committee for a bill that would provide fertility treatment benefits to married lesbian couples, but said he would introduce an amendment to the bill that would repeal the state's in vitro fertilisation coverage requirement.

In 2016, Kipke voted against a bill to restore voting rights for ex-felons, calling it a "distracting issue" in discussions on how to help people re-entering society.

In May 2019, Kipke penned a letter to Governor Larry Hogan asking him to withhold state funds from the Baltimore Symphony Orchestra (BSO) after it cancelled its summer concert series and cut musicians' pay and vacation time. He later voted in favor of a bill providing $3.2 million in additional funding to the BSO over two years in June 2019.

In 2020, Kipke said he supported a referendum to legalize sports betting.

In 2023, Kipke said he opposed the Maryland Child Victims Act, a bill that would eliminate the statute of limitations on child sexual abuse cases, saying that he considered the bill "unconstitutional". He later voted for the bill during legislative session.

=== Taxes ===
Kipke criticized the O'Malley administration for repeatedly raising taxes during his tenure, calling it "the real crisis in Maryland", and called for the repeal of Maryland's "Rain Tax". During the Hogan administration, he endorsed administration proposals and introduced bills to cut taxes in the state, and criticized legislation raising taxes.

Kipke has criticized proposals to allow counties to implement a progressive income tax, calling the idea a "failed economic strategy" and an "adolescent approach to taxes". In 2021, during a debate on a bill to allow counties to impose bracket-based income taxes, he introduced an amendment that would prohibit counties from increasing income taxes on wealthier residents without lowering taxes on those with lower income. The amendment failed by a 48-88 vote.

== Personal life ==
Kipke is married to his wife, Susannah Kipke, who owns Mrs. Kipke's Secure Gun Storage in Millersville, Maryland. Together, they have three children. In May 2023, Susannah joined a National Rifle Association lawsuit challenging the Gun Safety Act of 2023, a gun control bill signed by Governor Wes Moore during the 2023 legislative session.

Kipke's first marriage, to Morgan Uebersax Kipke, ended in divorce in 2012. The Vote Smart web site in 2013 listed Nic and Morgan Kipke as having two children. Kipke's web site showed Nic and Morgan Kipke in photos with two children in 2008 and 2010.

Kipke is the chair of the church council of the Our Lady of the Chesapeake Catholic Church in Pasadena, Maryland.

== Electoral history ==
Maryland House of Delegates District 31 Republican primary election, 2006
Party	Candidate	Votes	%
Republican	Steve Schuh	4,860	28.6
Republican	Don H. Dwyer Jr.	3,641	21.5
Republican	Nicholaus R. Kipke	3,514	20.7
Republican	James Christopher Braswell	2,627	15.5
Republican	Pat Corcoran	2,325	13.7

Maryland House of Delegates District 31 election, 2006
Party	Candidate	Votes	%
Republican	Nicholaus R. Kipke	19,049	18.4
Republican	Don H. Dwyer Jr.	18,150	17.5
Republican	Steve Schuh	17,558	17.0
Democratic	Joan Cadden (incumbent)	17,533	16.9
Democratic	Thomas J. Fleckenstein	16,654	16.1
Democratic	Craig A. Reynolds	14,454	14.0
Write-in		58	0.1

Maryland House of Delegates District 31 election, 2010
Party	Candidate	Votes	%
Republican	Nicholaus R. Kipke (incumbent)	24,143	22.0
Republican	Steve Schuh (incumbent)	22,805	20.7
Republican	Don Dwyer, Jr. (incumbent)	22,452	20.4
Democratic	Jeremiah Chiappelli	12,943	11.8
Democratic	Justin M. Towles	11,968	10.9
Democratic	Robert L. Eckert	11,856	10.8
Libertarian	Joshua Matthew Crandall	2,015	1.8
Constitution	Cory Faust, Sr.	1,660	1.5
Write-in		105	0.1

Maryland House of Delegates District 31B election, 2014
Party	Candidate	Votes	%
Republican	Nicholaus R. Kipke (incumbent)	20,858	39.9
Republican	Meagan Simonaire	19,555	37.4
Democratic	Jeremiah Chiappelli	6,332	12.1
Democratic	Doug Morris	5,394	10.3
Write-in		88	0.2

Maryland House of Delegates District 31B election, 2018
Party	Candidate	Votes	%
Republican	Brian Chisholm	20,573	33.2
Republican	Nicholaus R. Kipke (incumbent)	20,434	33.0
Democratic	Karen Patricia Simpson	11,257	18.2
Democratic	Harry E. Freeman	9,602	15.5
Write-in		49	0.1

Maryland House of Delegates District 31 election, 2022
Party	Candidate	Votes	%
Republican	Nicholaus R. Kipke (incumbent)	28,518	22.2
Republican	Brian Chisholm (incumbent)	27,570	21.5
Republican	Rachel Muñoz (incumbent)	26,117	20.4
Democratic	Kevin Burke	19,953	15.6
Democratic	Milad Pooran	17,213	15.6
Libertarian	Travis S. Lerol	8,509	6.6
Write-in		356	0.3

Maryland House of Delegates
Preceded by Tony O'Donnell	Minority Leader of the Maryland House of Delegates; 2013–2021	Succeeded by Jason Buckel
