= Gary Simmons =

Gary Simmons may refer to:

- Gary Simmons (ice hockey)
- Gary Simmons (artist)
- Gary Simmons (politician)
