= Ned Carey =

American politician (born 1962)

Edward Carey
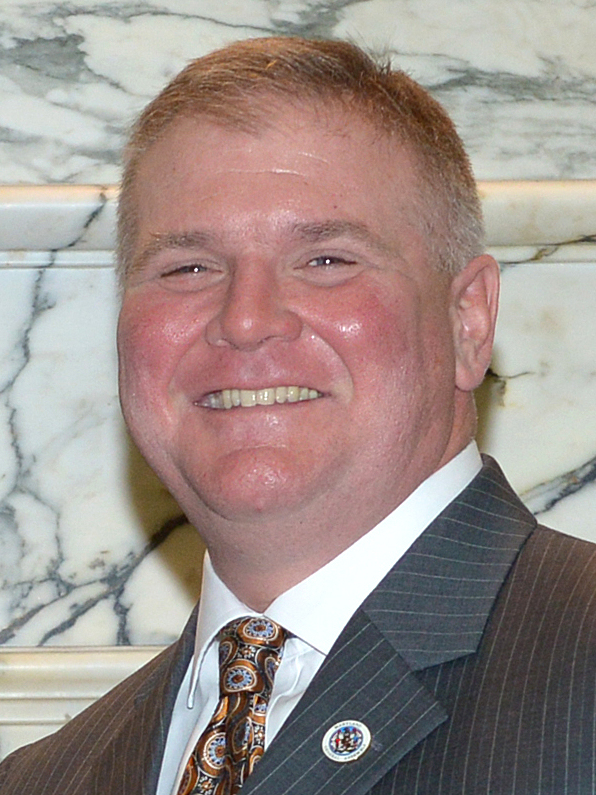

Member of the Maryland House of Delegates from the 31A district
- In office January 14, 2015 – January 11, 2023
- Preceded by: Steve Schuh
- Succeeded by: Gary Simmons

Personal details
- Born: February 7, 1962 (age 64); Brooklyn Park, Maryland
- Party: Democratic
- Spouse: Pam
- Children: 1

Edward "Ned" Carey (born February 7, 1962, in Brooklyn Park, Maryland) is an American politician who was Democratic member of the Maryland House of Delegates for District 31A, based in Anne Arundel County, from 2015 to 2023.

== Early life and career ==
Carey was born in Brooklyn Park, Maryland, where he has lived for his entire life. He attended Brooklyn Park High School, and earned a B.A. in urban planning from University of Maryland, College Park in 1984.

Before serving in the House of Delegates, Carey worked as the chief administrative officer at Baltimore Washington International Thurgood Marshall Airport. He was also a former member of the Anne Arundel County Spending Affordability Committee, where he served two terms as chairman, and on the boards of MedStar Harbor Hospital, the Chesapeake Arts Center in Brooklyn Park, Opportunity Builders Inc. and other local institutions.

== In the legislature ==
Carey was elected to the House of Delegates in the 2014 General Assembly elections, succeeding former delegate Steve Schuh. He has been described as one of the most conservative Democrats in the House, earning a score of 26 percent in an analysis from American Conservative Union, the highest among other Democrats in the Maryland General Assembly.

Shortly after being sworn into office in 2014, Delegate Carey joined the Maryland Legislative Sportsmen's Caucus as a means of expressing his commitment to protecting and promoting pro-sportsmen legislation at the capitol. During the 2015 legislative session, Carey cosponsored House Bill 464, which would allow for reciprocity in honoring out-of-state concealed carry permits. He also introduced House Joint Resolution 5, which would extend the goose hunting and duck hunting season on the Eastern Shore to run through February of each year.

In April 2022, Carey announced that he would not seek re-election to the House of Delegates in 2022.

=== Committee assignments ===
- Economic Matters Committee, 2015–2023 (banking, economic development, science and technology subcommittee, 2015–18; consumer protection and commercial law subcommittee, 2015–18; chair, unemployment insurance subcommittee, 2019–2021; vice-chair, alcoholic beverages subcommittee, 2019; chair, property & casualty insurance subcommittee, 2021–2023)
- Regional Revitalization Work Group, 2015–2023
- House Chair, Joint Committee on Unemployment Insurance Oversight, 2019–2023

=== Other memberships ===
- Chair, Anne Arundel County House Delegation, 2019–20 (chair, education subcommittee, 2015; chair, alcohol subcommittee, 2016–2023; member, capital budget subcommittee, 2016–2023; vice-chair, 2018)
- Maryland Legislative Sportsmen's Caucus, 2015–2023
- Maryland Veterans Caucus, 2019–2023

== Personal life ==
Carey is Catholic.

== Electoral history ==
Maryland House of Delegates District 31A Democratic Primary Election, 2014
| Party | Candidate | Votes | % |
| Democratic | Ned Carey | 1,432 | 63 |
| Democratic | John Moran | 590 | 26 |
| Democratic | Robert Haynes | 259 | 11 |

Maryland House of Delegates District 31A General Election, 2014
| Party | Candidate | Votes | % |
| Democratic | Ned Carey | 5,221 | 53 |
| Republican | Terry Lynn DeGraw | 4,698 | 47 |
| Other/Write-In | Other/Write-In | 9 | 0 |

Maryland House of Delegates District 31A Democratic Primary Election, 2018
| Party | Candidate | Votes | % |
| Democratic | Ned Carey | 1,811 | 100 |

Maryland House of Delegates District 31A General Election, 2018
| Party | Candidate | Votes | % |
| Democratic | Ned Carey | 6,976 | 57 |
| Republican | Brooks Bennett | 5,278 | 43 |
| Other/Write-In | Other/Write-In | 24 | 0 |
