= Kenneth Holt =

American politician (born 1951)

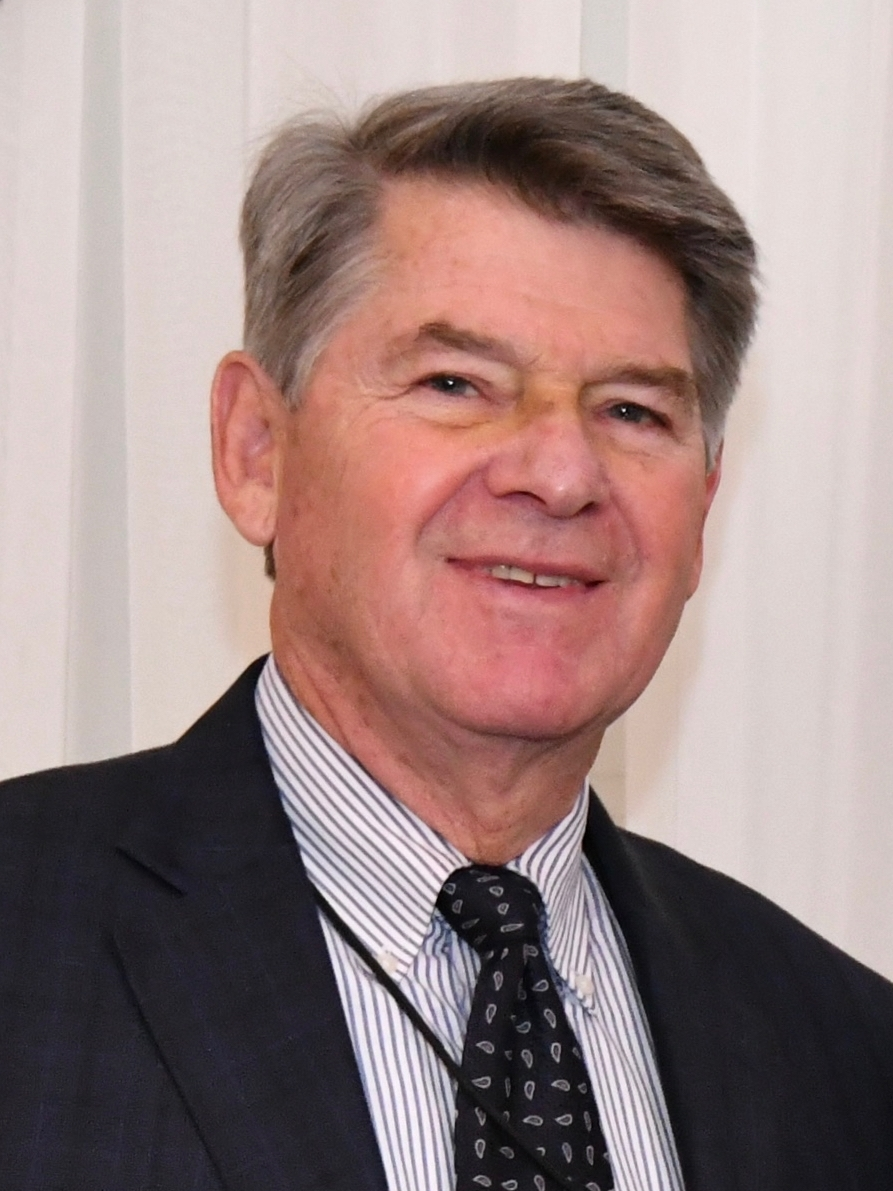
- Holt in 2019

Maryland Secretary of Housing and Community Development
- In office March 13, 2015 – December 31, 2022; Acting: January 21, 2015 – March 13, 2015
- Governor: Larry Hogan
- Preceded by: Clarence J. Snuggs (acting)
- Succeeded by: Owen P. McEvoy (acting); Jake Day

Member of the Maryland House of Delegates from the 6th district
- In office January 11, 1995 – January 13, 1999 Serving with Diane DeCarlo and Michael H. Weir
- Preceded by: E. Farrell Maddox
- Succeeded by: Nancy Hubers

Personal details
- Born: June 15, 1951 (age 75) St. Louis, Missouri, U.S.
- Party: Republican
- Children: 2
- Education: University of Maryland, College Park (BA)

Kenneth C. Holt (born June 15, 1951) is an American politician who served as the Secretary of the Maryland Department of Housing and Community Development from 2015 to 2023. A member of the Republican Party, he previously served as a member of the Maryland House of Delegates from 1995 to 1999 representing District 6, which included parts of Baltimore and Harford counties.

== Early life and education ==
Holt was born and raised in St. Louis, Missouri, on June 15, 1951. He came to Maryland to attend the University of Maryland, College Park, receiving his Bachelor of Arts degree in 1974. While attending the University of Maryland, Holt worked as a busser at the Laurel Park racetrack and on his grandfather's farm, Mount Peru, in Baltimore County. Holt inherited his grandfather's estate after two drifters broke in and killed his grandfather in 1986; he still lives at Mount Peru, where he raises thoroughbred horses.

== Political career ==
Holt became interested in politics during his early years, embracing fiscal conservatism and the Republican Party but also expressing fascination with the Kennedy family and Martin Luther King Jr. He became more involved with politics after his grandfather's death in 1986, serving as a member of the Baltimore County Human Relations Board from 1988 to 1994 and as the president of the Baltimore County Police Foundation from 1992 to 1994.

=== Maryland House of Delegates ===
Holt was elected to the Maryland House of Delegates in 1994, and was sworn in on January 11, 1995. During his tenure, he was a member of the Appropriations Committee, including its education and economic development subcommittee, and the Joint Audit Committee. He supported an unrealized proposal to build a NASCAR speedway in eastern Baltimore County and was a member of the Task Force on NASCAR Motor Sports from 1996 to 1997.

Holt was considered a rising star within the Maryland Republican Party. He unsuccessfully ran for the Maryland Senate in 1998, losing to incumbent Democratic state senator Michael J. Collins in the general election with 44.8 percent of the vote.

=== Post-legislative career ===
Holt stayed out of local politics following his defeat in the 1998 Maryland Senate election, focusing instead on his farm and working in the private sector as a financial advisor. He worked as a policy advisor within the administration of Maryland Governor Bob Ehrlich, where he helped develop proposals for slot machines and horse racing in the state, and served on the Maryland State Retirement and Pension System's Board of Trustees from 2003 to 2007.

On April 14, 2010, Holt announced that he would run for Baltimore County Executive in 2010, seeking to succeed Democratic county executive James T. Smith Jr., who was term-limited. He ran unopposed in the primary election and ran on a platform involving fiscal issues. Holt was defeated by county councilmember Kevin Kamenetz in the general election.

=== Maryland Secretary of Housing ===
In December 2014, Holt was named to serve on the transition team of Governor-elect Larry Hogan. Hogan named Holt to serve as Secretary of the Maryland Department of Housing and Community Development in January 2015. He was unanimously confirmed by the Maryland Senate on March 6, 2015, and sworn in on March 13.

In this position, Holt supported efforts to increase Maryland's affordable housing and home ownership rates, improve small business outreach, and provide funding for revitalizing urban areas, including in Baltimore through Project C.O.R.E. He also oversaw the launch of the SmartBuy program, which helped prospective new homebuyers purchase a house while paying off their student debt.

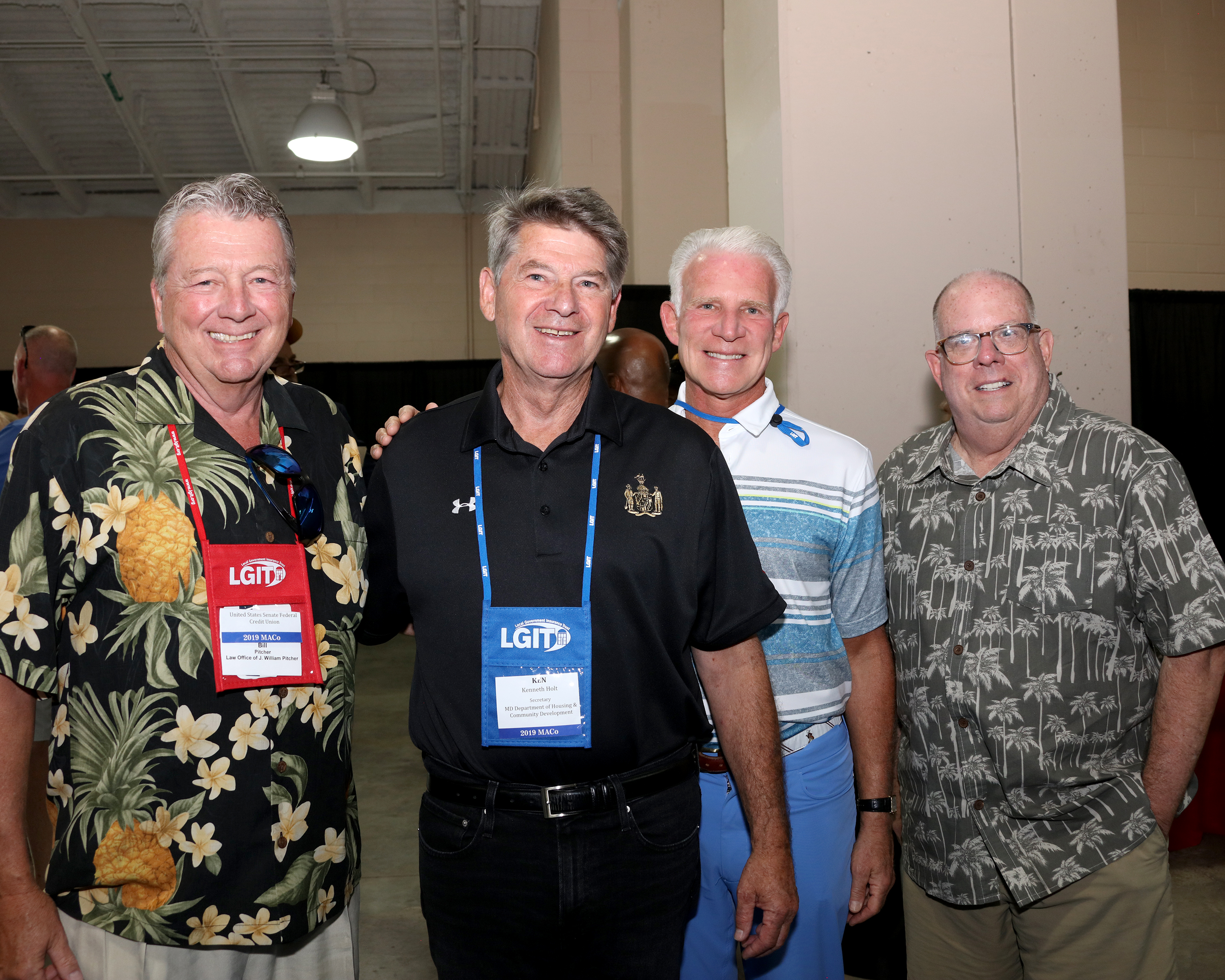
Holt at the Maryland Association of Counties summer conference with Governor Hogan, 2019

During the Maryland Association of Counties' summer conference in August 2015, Holt expressed support for loosening the state's lead paint poisoning laws, alleging that mothers were making their children put lead fishing weights in their mouth to make landlords liable to provide the child with free housing until they turn eighteen years old. When asked afterwards to provide evidence of this happening, Holt said that it was an anecdotal story told to him by a developer and that he had no evidence of this happening. A spokesperson for Governor Hogan said that he expressed his disappointment with Holt's "unfortunate and inappropriate comment" during a "lengthy and very direct conversation" afterwards, and multiple Democratic lawmakers signed onto a letter calling on Hogan to remove Holt from office; Hogan declined to do so. Holt apologized for his remarks the following day.

== Personal life ==
Holt is married has two children, including a daughter that he adopted while traveling with his wife to Russia to provide orphans with clothing and supplies following his defeat in the 1998 Maryland Senate election.

== Electoral history ==
Maryland House of Delegates District 6 Republican primary election, 1994
Party	Candidate	Votes	%
Republican	Kenneth C. Holt	2,029	23.4
Republican	Michael J. Davis	1,545	17.8
Republican	Nancy Hastings	1,514	17.5
Republican	Stephen Xintas	1,143	13.2
Republican	Robert Chaney	776	9.0
Republican	Thomas J. Kuegler Jr.	702	8.1
Republican	L. Keith Roberts	512	5.9
Republican	Bruce A. Laing	436	5.0

Maryland House of Delegates District 6 general election, 1994
Party	Candidate	Votes	%
Republican	Kenneth C. Holt	11,699	17.6
Democratic	Diane DeCarlo	11,445	17.2
Democratic	Michael H. Weir (incumbent)	11,254	16.9
Democratic	E. Farrell Maddox (incumbent)	11,135	16.8
Republican	Nancy Hastings	11,046	16.6
Republican	Michael J. Davis	9,857	14.8

Maryland Senate District 6 Republican primary election, 1998
Party	Candidate	Votes	%
Republican	Kenneth C. Holt	2,946	100.0

Maryland Senate District 6 general election, 1998
Party	Candidate	Votes	%
Democratic	Michael J. Collins (incumbent)	14,151	55.2
Republican	Kenneth C. Holt	11,463	44.8

Baltimore County Executive Republican primary election, 2010
Party	Candidate	Votes	%
Republican	Kenneth C. Holt	29,413	100.0

Baltimore County Executive general election, 2010
Party	Candidate	Votes	%
Democratic	Kevin Kamenetz	148,659	53.7
Republican	Kenneth C. Holt	127,882	46.2
Write-in		417	0.2
