= John R. Leopold =

American politician

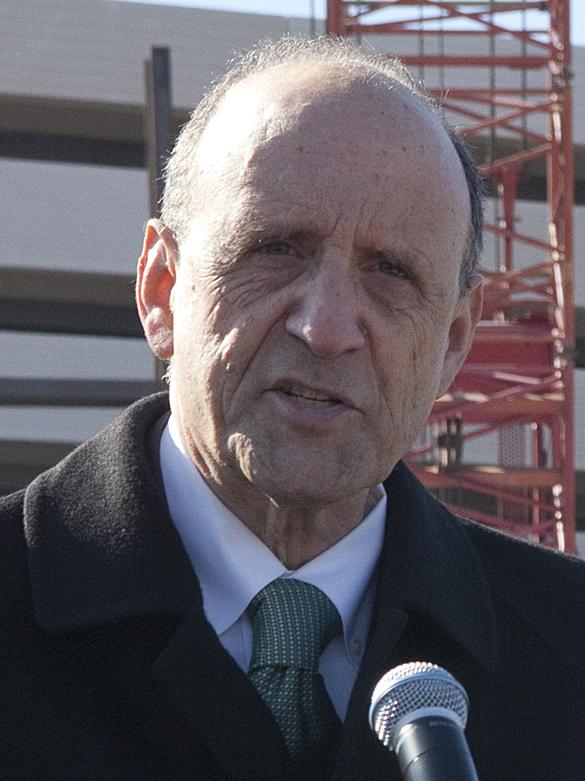
- Leopold in 2012

7th County Executive of Anne Arundel County
- In office December 4, 2006 – January 29, 2013
- Preceded by: Janet S. Owens
- Succeeded by: Laura Neuman

Member of the Maryland House of Delegates from the 31st district
- In office January 11, 1995 – December 4, 2006 Serving with Joan Cadden, Victoria L. Schade, Mary M. Rosso, Don H. Dwyer Jr.
- Preceded by: W. Ray Huff; Charles Stokes Kolodziejski
- Succeeded by: Steve Schuh; Nic Kipke
- In office January 12, 1983 – January 9, 1991 Serving with Philip C. Jimeno, Paula A. Long, Charles Stokes Kolodziejski, William Turc Sr., W. Ray Huff
- Preceded by: Walter "Walt" J. Shandrowsky; William J. Burkhead
- Succeeded by: Joan Cadden

Member of the Hawaii Senate from the 6th district
- In office 1974–1978 Serving with Anson Chong, Jean Sadako King, Wadsworth Yee
- Preceded by: Eureka B. Forbes; Mason Altiery; Percy K. Mirikitani; Wadsworth Yee
- Succeeded by: Neil Abercrombie; John Carroll

Member of the Hawaii House of Representatives from the 12th district
- In office 1970–1974 Serving with John Carroll, Herman Wedemeyer
- Preceded by: Richard S.H. "Dickie" Wong; Peter S. Iha; Rudolph Pacarro
- Succeeded by: Carl T. Takamura; Clarence Y. Akizaki

Personal details
- Born: February 4, 1943 (age 83) Philadelphia, Pennsylvania, U.S.
- Party: Republican
- Education: Hamilton College (BA)

John Robinson Leopold (born February 4, 1943) is an American politician who served in the state legislatures of Hawaii and Maryland and later as a county executive as a Republican. He was convicted of a common law misdemeanor-misconduct in office and served a 30-day sentence in county jail and received a fine. He resigned on February 1, 2013, and was succeeded by Laura Neuman, after a vote by the Anne Arundel County Council.

== Life ==
John Robinson Leopold was born on February 4, 1943, in Philadelphia, Pennsylvania. In 1964 he graduated from Hamilton College with a Bachelor's degree in English. Before moving to Maryland, Leopold was the first Republican elected to the Board of Education in Hawaii, where he served two years. He was also the State Director for Planned Parenthood while in Hawaii.

On June 29, 1967, he was elected as Republican chairman of the 16th Representative District. In 1970 he was elected to the Hawaii House of Representatives and was reelected in 1972.

On January 10, 1977, Leopold was appointed by President Gerald Ford to the National Title I Advisory Committee for the Education of Disadvantaged Children. On February 25, 1991, Leopold was appointed by President George Bush to the National Council on Disability and confirmed by the United States Senate.

Leopold was elected Anne Arundel County Executive on December 4, 2006, after serving 20 years in the Maryland House of Delegates.

=== Misconduct in office ===
On March 2, 2012, Leopold was indicted on multiple counts of misconduct in office for using his county-provided police security to investigate political opponents, to remove campaign signs, and to transport him to public places to engage in sexual liaisons with women.

On March 7, 2012, David Holway, President of the International Brotherhood of Police Officers held a press conference in Annapolis to demand the immediate resignation of Leopold and the Chief of Police, James Teare.

On January 29, 2013, Leopold was suspended from office after being found guilty on two counts of misconduct in office. He was subsequently sentenced to a $100,000 fine and two years in jail, with all jail time suspended except 30 days in jail and 30 days under house arrest. He voluntarily resigned from the office of the County Executive.

In April 2019, Anne Arundel County Circuit Court denied Leopold's request to vacate his criminal conviction. Leopold based the request on the grounds that his defense attorneys represented him ineffectively, which the judge disputed in her ruling.

=== 2018 campaign ===
In 2018 Leopold ran for a seat in the House of Delegates in District 31B, a two-delegate district which includes the area he previously served as a delegate. In the June 2018 Republican primary, Leopold placed third with 10% of the vote, behind Brian Chisholm (39%) and incumbent Del. Nic Kipke (43%), both of whom went on to the November 2018 general election.

== Electoral history ==
John R. Leopold electoral history

1970 Hawaii 12th House District election
Party	Candidate	Votes	%	±%
Republican	John Carroll	5,865	19.33%	
Democratic	Herman Wedemeyer	5,397	17.79%	
Republican	John R. Leopold	5,324	17.55%	
Democratic	John W. Elliott	5,187	17.09%	
Democratic	David M. Hagino	4,970	16.38%	
Republican	James V. Hall	3,600	11.86%	
Total votes		'30,343'	'100.00%'	

1972 Hawaii 12th House District election
Party	Candidate	Votes	%	±%
Republican	John R. Leopold (incumbent)	8,844	28.22%	+10.67%
Republican	John Carroll (incumbent)	8,239	26.29%	+6.96%
Democratic	Herman Wedemeyer (incumbent)	7,787	24.85%	+7.06%
Democratic	John W. Elliott	6,985	22.29%	+5.20%
Democratic	Max Nakata Garcia	4,280	13.66%	
Republican	Shirley Ann Sax	4,047	12.91%	
Total votes		'31,338'	'100.00%'	

1978 Hawaii Gubernatorial Republican primary
Party	Candidate	Votes	%	±%
Republican	John R. Leopold	20,524	91.56%	
Republican	Valentine K. Wessel	1,093	4.88%	
Republican	Gabriel Juarez	799	3.56%	
Total votes		'22,416'	'100.00%'	

1978 Hawaii Gubernatorial election
Party	Candidate	Votes	%	±%
Democratic	George Ariyoshi (incumbent)	153,394	54.48%	−0.10%
Republican	John R. Leopold	124,610	44.25%	−1.17%
Nonpartisan	Alema Leota	1,982	0.70%	+0.70%
Libertarian	Gregory Reeser	1,059	0.38%	+0.38%
Aloha Democratic	John Moore	542	0.19%	+0.19%
Total votes		'281,587'	'100.00%'	

2002 Maryland House of Delegates District 31 election
Party	Candidate	Votes	%	±%
Republican	John R. Leopold (incumbent)	24,937	24.31%	
Democratic	Joan Cadden (incumbent)	16,906	16.48%	
Republican	Don H. Dwyer Jr.	16,807	16.39%	
Republican	Thomas R. Gardner	15,321	14.94%	
Democratic	Mary Rosso (incumbent)	15,127	14.75%	
Democratic	Thomas J. Fleckenstein	13,404	13.07%	
Independent	write-in	73	0.07%	
Total votes		'102,575'	'100.00%'	

2006 Anne Arundel County County executive election
Party	Candidate	Votes	%	±%
Republican	John R. Leopold	12,410	36.74%	
Republican	Phillip D. Bissett	10,374	30.71%	
Republican	David G. Boschert	8,653	25.62%	
Republican	Tom Angelis	1,498	4.43%	
Republican	Gregory V. Nourse	846	2.50%	
Total votes		'33,781'	'100.00%'	

2006 Anne Arundel County County executive election
Party	Candidate	Votes	%	±%
Republican	John R. Leopold	93,668	51.02%	+2.80%
Democratic	George F. Johnson IV	89,740	48.88%	−2.90%
Independent	write-in	176	0.10%	+0.10%
Total votes		'183,584'	'100.00%'	

2010 Anne Arundel County County executive election
Party	Candidate	Votes	%	±%
Republican	John R. Leopold	98,654	50.45%	−0.57%
Democratic	Joanna Conti	86,230	44.10%	−4.78%
Green	Mike Shay	10,618	5.43%	+5.43%
Republican	John Williams Jr. (write-in)	51	0.03%	+0.03%
Total votes		'195,553'	'100.00%'	

2018 Maryland House of Delegates 31st District B Republican primary
Party	Candidate	Votes	%	±%
Republican	Nic Kipke	4,579	43.24%	
Republican	Brian A. Chisholm	4,119	38.89%	
Republican	John R. Leopold	1,030	9.73%	
Republican	David Lee Therrien	863	8.15%	
Total votes		'10,591'	'100.00%'	

Party political offices
Preceded by Randolph Crossley	Republican nominee for Governor of Hawaii; 1978	Succeeded by D. G. Anderson
Political offices
Preceded by Janet S. Owens	County Executive of Anne Arundel County; 2007–2013	Succeeded by Laura Neuman
