= Philip C. Jimeno =

American politician (born 1947)

Philip C. Jimeno (born February 28, 1947, in Fairmont, West Virginia) is an American politician and was a long-serving member of the Maryland State Legislature as a Democrat.

== Early life and education ==
He grew up in West Virginia and attended Fairmont State College. He was married in 1969, and he and his wife Ramona moved to Brooklyn Park, Maryland, in 1970. He worked as a probation and parole officer in Baltimore and was involved in the local improvement association, the Roland Terrace Democratic Club and became president of the Greater Brooklyn Park Council.

== Political career ==
In 1978, he decided to run for a seat in the Maryland House of Delegates. He won that election, and went on to represent District 31 in the Maryland General Assembly from 1985 until his retirement in 2007.

Mr. Jimeno claims lead sponsorship on more than 65 legislative bills and claims co-sponsorship of more than 200. One of his pieces of legislation was Maryland Senate Bill 305, known as Annie's Bill, which was passed in the early 1990s. It set a new standard for timely and compulsory blood-alcohol testing and toughened drunken driving laws, allowing for drivers' in accidents where a person was seriously injured or killed to be tested for alcohol at the time of the incident, rather than a day or so later.

In his election challenge in 2002, Mr. Jimeno won re-election with 62% of the vote against his Republican challenger, David K. Kyle, who received 38%.

Maryland House of Delegates
Preceded by Harold Louis Bachman; William J. Helms Jr. John J. Fallon	Member of the Maryland House of Delegates from the 31st district 1979–1985; Served alongside: Walter "Walt" J. Shandrowsky, William J. Burkhead, Paula A. Long, John R. Leopold, Charles Stokes Kolodziejski	Succeeded by William Turc Sr.
Maryland Senate
Preceded by Jerome F. Connell Sr.	Member of the Maryland Senate from the 31st district 1985–2007	Succeeded by Bryan Simonaire
