= Victor Sulin =

American politician (1942–2022)

Victor Alexander Sulin III (May 23, 1942 – January 29, 2022) was an American politician.

Sulin was born in Baltimore, Maryland, and graduated from Arundel High School. He grew up on the Sulin family tobacco farm in Severn, Maryland. Sulin graduated from University of Maryland in 1964. He then served in the United States Air Force and was commissioned a captain. Sulin received his Juris Doctor degree from the University of Maryland School of Law in 1972 and was admitted to the Maryland bar. Sulin served in the Anne Arundel County, Maryland State's Attorney office retiring in 2001. Sulin served in the Maryland House of Delegates from 1991 to 1994 and was a Democrat.
