= Gary Simmons (politician) =

American politician (born 1971)

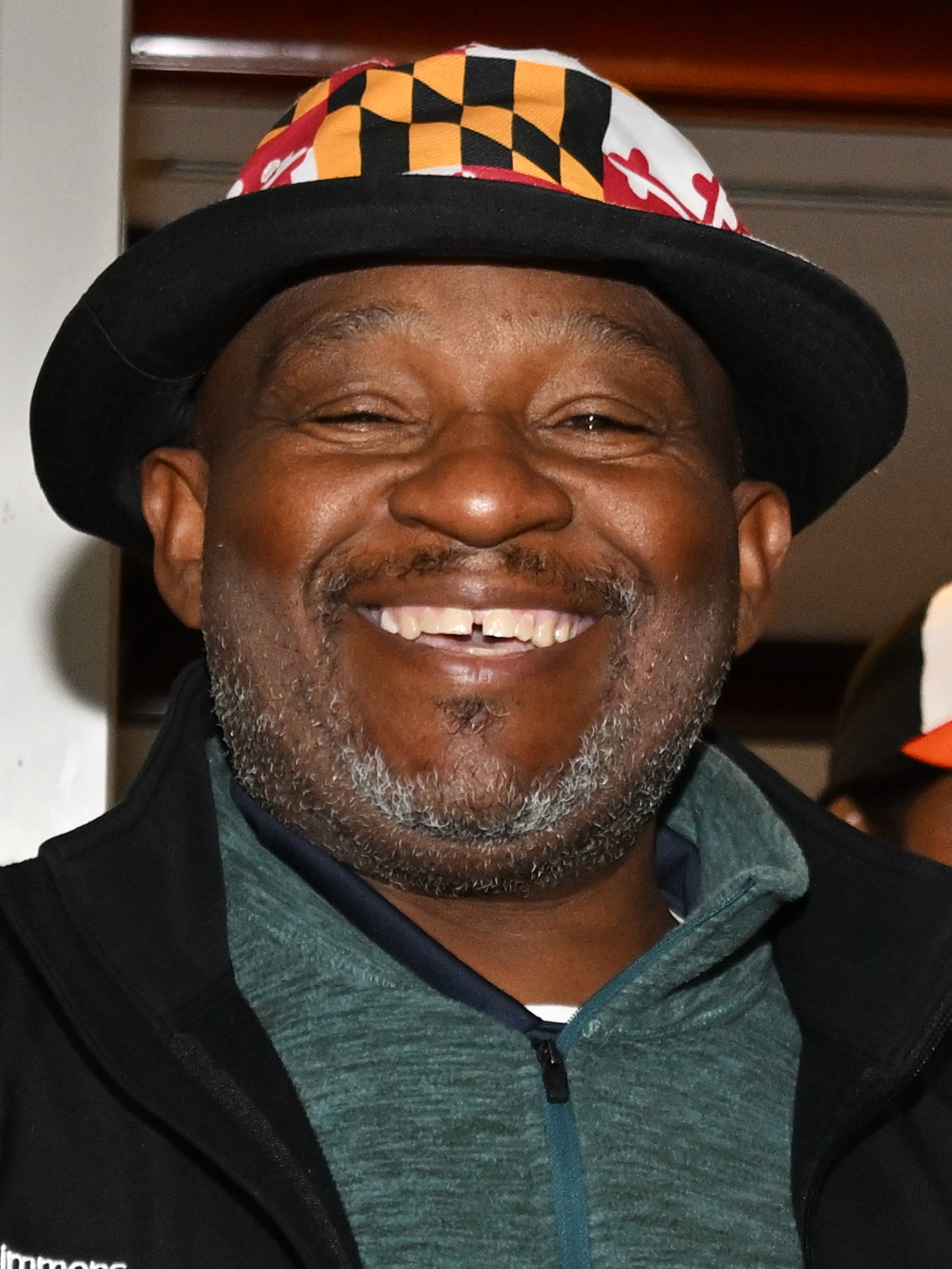

Member of the Maryland House of Delegates from the 12B district
- Incumbent
- Assumed office January 11, 2023
- Preceded by: Ned Carey

Personal details
- Born: July 25, 1971 (age 55) Savannah, Georgia, U.S.
- Party: Democratic
- Education: Tuskegee University (BS)
- Website: Campaign website

Gary Simmons (born July 25, 1971) is an American politician and retired military law enforcement officer. He is a member of the Maryland House of Delegates for District 12B in Anne Arundel County, Maryland.

== Background ==
Simmons graduated from Walter G. O'Connell Copiague High School in 1990, and later attended Tuskegee University, where he earned a Bachelor of Science degree in criminal justice and political science in 1994. Before becoming a state delegate, Simmons was a sergeant field training officer at Luminis Health, Inc.

In 2022, Simmons ran for the Maryland House of Delegates in District 31 (later drawn into the newly created District 12B), seeking to succeed outgoing state delegate Ned Carey. He won the Democratic primary on July 19, 2022, and defeated Republican challenger Ashley Arias in the general election on November 8.

== In the legislature ==
Simmons was sworn into the Maryland House of Delegates on January 11, 2023. He is a member of the House Judiciary Committee.

In January 2025, after the Anne Arundel Democratic Central Committee voted to nominate state delegate Shaneka Henson to fill the remainder of Sarah Elfreth's term in the Maryland Senate, Simmons wrote a letter to state and local Democratic officials calling on the central committee to take action against Geonta Simmons, one of its members, for openly discussing what occurred at a private meeting of four elected officials (both the Simmonses, state senator Clarence Lam, and central committee member Jacqueline Allsup) about the District 30 Senate vacancy. However, Simmons accidentally used his official legislative stationery to publish the letter, which may have been a violation of legislative ethics rules, which prohibit the official stationery being used for matters related to a political campaign. Simmons later retracted his letter—calling it a "rookie mistake" in an interview with Maryland Matters—and resent it ten days later on a personal stationery, and subsequently retracted that letter as well. Deadra Daly, the Maryland General Assembly's ethics counsel, told Maryland Matters that she was concerned by Simmons using his official letterhead to publish the letter since central committee matters "seems to fall in the political category", but added that Simmons admitting his own error may mitigate the risk of any potential consequences.

In 2026, Simmons sued primary challenger John Dove Jr. to disqualify Dove as a candidate in the Democratic primary race. The Supreme Court of Maryland sided with Simmons, finding that Dove misrepresented his address when he filed as a candidate.

In September 2026, Simmons was cited by officials for spending his campaign funds on what appeared to be various personal expenses, including over $3,000 in cash withdrawals and debit card purchases from the Maryland Motor Vehicle Administration, an eye doctor, and a dentist's office. Officials ordered Simmons to pay a fine of $5,000 or by next month stand trial in district court. Simmons responded to the citation by accepting responsibility "for not ensuring that my campaign's financial procedures fully complied with Maryland law" and by reimbursing his campaign for the expenses, but noting that "there has been no finding of criminal intent".

== Political positions ==
During the 2026 legislative session, Simmons supported a bill to raise the minimum wage of Maryland from $15 to $25 an hour and eliminate all subminimum wages.

== Personal life ==
In July 2026, Simmons was charged with second-degree assault after his stepdaughter told Anne Arundel County Police that an argument at Simmons's home had turned physical. According to charging documents, Simmons asked his stepdaughter to move her vehicle; after she jokingly replied "no", Simmons started to put his hands in her face and grabbed her left arm very tightly after she pushed his hands away.

== Electoral history ==
Maryland House of Delegates District 12B Democratic primary election, 2022
Party	Candidate	Votes	%
Democratic	Gary Simmons	829	34.7
Democratic	Daniel J. McGinty	809	33.9
Democratic	Jeff Garcia	751	31.4

Maryland House of Delegates District 12B general election, 2022
Party	Candidate	Votes	%
Democratic	Gary Simmons	5,856	55.41
Republican	Ashley Arias	4,692	44.40
Write-in		20	0.19
