= Clarence Y. Akizaki =

American politician (1928–2001)

Member of the Hawaii House of Representatives
- In office 1963–1976

Personal details
- Born: May 12, 1928 Honolulu, Hawaii, U.S.
- Died: March 29, 2001 (aged 72)
- Party: Democratic

Clarence Y. Akizaki (May 12, 1928 – March 29, 2001) was an American politician. He served as a Democratic member of the Hawaii House of Representatives.

== Life and career ==
Akizaki was born in Honolulu, Hawaii, and had Japanese ancestry.

Akizaki served in the Hawaii House of Representatives from 1963 to 1976.

Akizaki died on March 29, 2001, at the age of 72.
