= Steve Schuh =

American politician

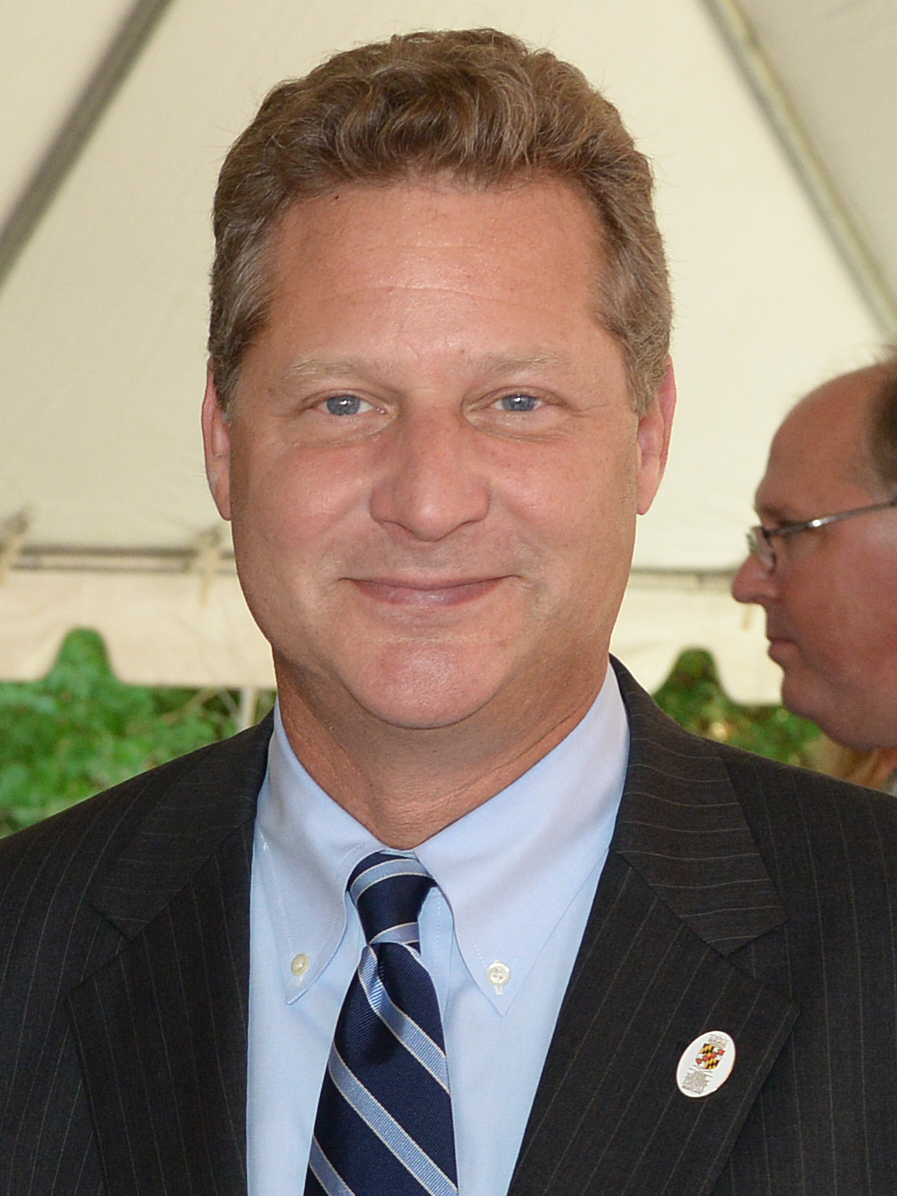
- Schuh in 2015

10th County Executive of Anne Arundel County
- In office December 2, 2014 – December 3, 2018
- Preceded by: Laura Neuman
- Succeeded by: Steuart Pittman

Member of the Maryland House of Delegates from District 31
- In office January 10, 2007 – December 1, 2014 Serving with Nic Kipke; Don H. Dwyer Jr.
- Preceded by: John R. Leopold; Joan Cadden
- Succeeded by: (district split)

Personal details
- Born: July 25, 1960 (age 66) Baltimore, Maryland, U.S.
- Party: Republican

Steven R. Schuh (born July 25, 1960) is a former County Executive of Anne Arundel County, Maryland, and a former member of the Maryland House of Delegates, serving two terms in the Maryland General Assembly representing District 31 (Pasadena, Glen Burnie, Brooklyn Park, Severna Park, and Millersville). Beginning in 2018, Schuh served as the Executive Director for the State of Maryland's Opioid Operational Command Center before assuming the role of Deputy Secretary for Health Care Financing and Medicaid in 2021. Schuh also played an instrumental role in the State's response to the pandemic serving as Section Chief for the Governor's COVID-19 Task Force.

== Education ==
Schuh is a graduate of Severn School and grew up in Crofton, Maryland, in Anne Arundel County. He holds a Bachelor of Arts degree in Economics and Political Science from Dartmouth College. Schuh holds two Master's degrees – a Master of Business Administration and a Master of Science in Education from Harvard University and Johns Hopkins University, respectively. He is also a graduate of Leadership Anne Arundel's Flagship Program.

== Career ==
Schuh has been in business for nearly thirty years. He is President of Schuh Advisory, a private equity firm that specializes in starting new businesses. Previously, he was a Managing Director of Baltimore-based Alex. Brown & Sons, an investment banking and brokerage firm (and its successor entities), and a Managing Director of Credit Suisse, an international financial-services firm. Schuh was a senior partner in the corporate finance practices of both firms and is a nationally recognized expert in healthcare finance.

== Community involvement ==
Schuh serves as Board Treasurer of the Baltimore Symphony Orchestra and Founder/President of the Schuh Family Foundation. Schuh previously served as a board member of the R. Adams Cowley Shock Trauma Center at the University of Maryland Medical Center and member of the Executive Committee of the United Way of Central Maryland. Additionally, Schuh served as Board Chair of the Baltimore Metropolitan Council, Board Member of the Economic Alliance of Greater Baltimore, Board Chairman of the American Red Cross of Central Maryland, a Board Member of Severn School, Board Vice Chair of Chesapeake Academy, a Board Member of Chesapeake Arts Center, and President of Eagle Cove School.

== Legislative notes ==
Schuh was a member of the House Economic Matters Committee and the House Appropriations Committee (2007-2011) and serves as Chairman of the Anne Arundel County Delegation to the House of Delegates (2013-2014).

=== Taxes and fees ===
- Co-sponsored legislation lowering the cap on property tax assessments.
- Co-sponsored "Taxpayer Bill of Rights" requiring that tax increases be subject to voter approval.
- Sponsored legislation increasing the number of votes required to raise taxes to a three-fifths majority.
- Voted against increases in the sales tax, cigarette tax, gas tax, hospital tax and Bay Restoration Fund fee.

=== Government reform ===
- Co-sponsored legislation requiring non-partisan redistricting of legislative districts.
- Sponsored legislation requiring term limits for elected officials.
- Sponsored legislation creating an elected school board in Anne Arundel County.

=== Public safety ===
- Sponsored "Jessica's Law 2010," tripling jail time for child sex offenders.
- Voted against granting "good behavior" credits to sex offenders and parolees.

=== Education ===
- Co-sponsored legislation requiring that slots revenues be used to hire additional school resource officers.
- Co-sponsored legislation creating a revolving loan fund for charter school construction projects.
- Co-sponsored law expanding notification procedures for school officials when juveniles commit crimes.

=== Environment ===
- Voted to reduce emissions from coal-fired power plants.
- Co-sponsored legislation temporarily exempting businesses relocating to Maryland from paying property taxes.
- Co-Sponsored legislation establishing tax-free back-to-school shopping.
- Voted to require counties to repair failing storm pipes and restore eroded creeks.

== Controversial positions ==
- As County Executive, Schuh proposed prohibiting medical marijuana facilities contrary to the Maryland Attorney General's statement that counties cannot ban operations allowed by state law.
- While County Executive, Schuh addressed students in a series of emails regarding teacher pay which were considered to be demeaning and condescending by students, and was called-out by many in local papers.

== Election results ==
- 2018 General Election for County Executive

Name	Votes	Percent	Outcome
Steuart Pittman, Dem.	118,572	52.3%	Won
Steve Schuh, Rep.	107,905	47.6%	Lost
Other Write-Ins	259	0.1%	Lost

- 2018 Primary Election for County Executive

Name	Votes	Percent	Outcome
Steve Schuh, Rep.	23,874	100%	Won

- 2014 General Election for County Executive

Candidate	Votes	Party	Percentage
Schuh, Steve	107,952	Republican	61.10%
Johnson, George IV	68,379	Democrat	38.70%
Write-In	340		.19%
Total	176,671		100%

- 2014 Primary Election for County Executive

Candidate	Votes	Party	Percentage
Schuh, Steve	17,563	Republican	54.31%
Neuman, Laura	14,776	Republican	45.69%
Total	32,339		100%

- 2010 Race for Maryland House of Delegates – 31st District

Voters to choose three:

Name	Votes	Percent	Outcome
Nic Kipke, Rep.	24,143	22.0%	Won
Steve Schuh, Rep.	22,805	20.7%	Won
Don H. Dwyer Jr., Rep.	22,452	20.4%	Won
Jeremiah Chiappelli, Dem.	12,943	11.8%	Lost
Justin M. Towles, Dem.	11,968	10.9%	Lost
Robert L. Eckert, Dem.	11,856	10.8%	Lost
Joshua Matthew Crandall, Lib.	2,015	1.8%	Lost
Cory Faust Sr., Con.	1,660	1.5%	Lost
Other Write-Ins	105	0.1%	

- 2006 Race for Maryland House of Delegates – 31st District

Voters to choose three:

Name	Votes	Percent	Outcome
Steve Schuh, Rep.	19,049	18.4%	Won
Nic Kipke, Rep.	18,150	17.5%	Won
Don H. Dwyer Jr., Rep.	17,558	17.0%	Won
Joan Cadden, Dem.	17,533	16.9%	Lost
Thomas J. Fleckenstein, Dem.	16,654	16.1%	Lost
Craig A. Reynolds, Dem.	14,454	14.0%	Lost
Other Write-Ins	58	0.1%	
