= Victoria L. Schade =

American politician

Delegate Maryland District 31
- In office 1995–1999
- Preceded by: W. Ray Huff & Charles Kolodziejski
- Succeeded by: Mary Rosso
- Constituency: Anne Arundel County

Personal details
- Born: December 31, 1970 (age 55) Baltimore, Maryland
- Party: Republican

Victoria L. Schade (born December 31, 1970) is an American politician who served as a Republican member of the Maryland House of Delegates, representing District 31 in Anne Arundel County, from 1995 to 1999.

== Background ==
Delegate Schade was first elected to the Maryland House of Delegates in January 1995 to represent District 31 in Anne Arundel County, which covers the northern part of the county, including Glen Burnie. She only served 1 term before being defeated in the 1998 general election by Mary Russo.

== Education ==
Delegate Schade graduated from Chesapeake High School in Pasadena, Maryland. After high school she attended the University of Maryland, Baltimore County, better known as UMBC, where she graduated cum laude with her bachelor's degrees in political science and economics in 1991.

== Career ==
Delegate Schade had a short-lived career in the Maryland House of Delegates. The only committee she served on was the Economic Matters Committee. Prior to being elected she was a collection representative for Baltimore Gas & Electric.

Since getting voted out of the House, she has served as a legislative liaison to the Department of the Environment. She is a former legislative assistant. In 1992, she was the coordinator for District 31 for the Bush/Quayle campaign. She has been a member of the North County Republican Club and the Republican Professional Women's club since 1992.

== Election results ==
- 1998 Race for Maryland House of Delegates – District 31

Voters to choose three:

Name	Votes	Percent	Outcome
John R. Leopold, Rep.	21,632	23%	Won
Joan Cadden, Dem.	19,214	20%	Won
Mary Rosso, Dem.	15,372	16%	Won
Victoria L. Schade, Rep.	15,366	16%	Lost
Robert Schaeffer, Rep.	12,092	14%	Lost
Thomas J. Fleckenstein, Dem.	11,862	12%	Lost

- 1994 Race for Maryland House of Delegates – District 31

Voters to choose three:

Name	Votes	Percent	Outcome
John R. Leopold, Rep.	19,960	24%	Won
Joan Cadden, Dem.	16,492	20%	Won
Victoria L. Schade, Rep.	14,801	18%	Won
W. Ray Huff, Dem.	14,203	17%	Lost
C. Stokes Kolodziejski, Dem.	13,176	16%	Lost
Douglas Arnold, Rep.	3,586	4%	Lost
