= Don H. Dwyer Jr. =

American politician

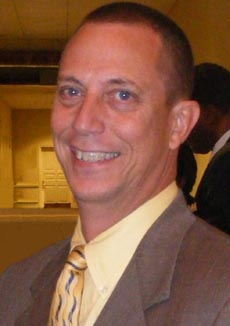

Member of the Maryland House of Delegates from the 31st district
- In office January 8, 2003 – January 14, 2015
- Succeeded by: Meagan C. Simonaire & Nicholaus R. Kipke
- Constituency: Annapolis, Maryland

Personal details
- Born: February 11, 1958 (age 68) Annapolis, Maryland
- Party: Republican
- Spouse: Cheryl
- Children: 3
- Occupation: Politician

Don H. Dwyer Jr. (born February 11, 1958) is an American former politician and former member of the Maryland House of Delegates. He served the 31st District of Anne Arundel County from January 8, 2003, to January 14, 2015. A member of the Republican Party, Dwyer is known for his conservative positions on certain issues, including outspoken opposition to same-sex marriage in Maryland. He was reelected by 25 votes in the November 2006 election and reelected again in 2010. He was defeated in the June, 2014 Republican primary, thought to be largely due to his legal troubles. Since 2017, Dwyer has lived in Clearwater, Florida. As of April 2021, Dwyer chairs the Board of Supervisors for the Clearwater Cay Community Development District.

== Alcohol-related legal issues ==
Dwyer has admitted to drinking on a "pretty regular" basis, beginning at the end of the 2011 legislative session. He has also spoken of attending counseling sessions and Alcoholics Anonymous meetings to cope with alcohol dependency.

On August 22, 2012, Dwyer was operating a motorboat on the Magothy River when he collided with another vessel, seriously injuring himself, John Moran IV, his companion and former police officer, and five others. Among the others injured were three children, including a 5-year-old girl who fractured her skull. Dwyer's blood alcohol content tested three times the legal limit of 0.08. He admitted to operating the boat under the influence at a news conference held outside Maryland Shock Trauma, adding that he regretted his actions. On August 6, 2013, Dwyer pleaded guilty to the charges but appealed his 30-day jail sentence.

While he was appealing, early on the morning of August 20, 2013, Dwyer was pulled over by an Anne Arundel County sheriff's deputy in his 2001 Cadillac DeVille for suspected intoxication. After showing signs of alcohol intoxication, failing field sobriety tests, and refusing a to submit to a breathalyzer examination, he was arrested and transported to the Eastern District for booking.

He was again found guilty and received an additional 30-day sentence for that offense, for a total of 60 days in jail. He did not resign his seat.

Dwyer claimed his drinking that led to the boat accident was a result of marital problems and feeling betrayed by fellow lawmakers who supported legislation in favor of same-sex marriage in Maryland. Dwyer said "I felt a tremendous amount of pressure in my family. You take those personal issues [and] add betrayal on the professional side, and it really gets to be overwhelming."

== Political fundraising ==
At a May 2013 fundraiser for his political campaign, Rep. Dwyer hosted an auction of assault weapons during a "Gun Rights and Liberty BBQ".

== Election results ==
- 2002 General Election for Maryland House of Delegates – District 31

Voters to choose three:

Name	Votes	Percent	Outcome
John R. Leopold, Rep.	24,937	24.31%	Won
Joan Cadden, Dem.	16,906	16.48%	Won
Don Dwyer Jr., Rep.	16,807	16.39%	Won
Thomas R. Gardner, Rep.	15,321	14.94%	Lost
Mary Rosso, Dem.	15,127	14.75%	Lost
Thomas J. Fleckenstein, Dem.	13,404	13.07%	Lost
Other Write-Ins	73	0.07%	

- 2006 General Election for Maryland House of Delegates – District 31

Voters to choose three:

Name	Votes	Percent	Outcome
Steve Schuh, Rep.	19,049	18.4%	Won
Nic Kipke, Rep.	18,150	17.5%	Won
Don Dwyer Jr., Rep.	17,558	17.0%	Won
Joan Cadden, Dem.	17,533	16.9%	Lost
Thomas J. Fleckenstein, Dem.	16,654	16.1%	Lost
Craig A. Reynolds, Dem.	14,454	14.0%	Lost
Other Write-Ins	58	0.1%	

- 2010 General Election for Maryland House of Delegates – District 31

Voters to choose three:

Name	Votes	Percent	Outcome
Nic Kipke, Rep.	24,143	21.96%	Won
Steve Schuh, Rep.	22,805	20.74%	Won
Don Dwyer Jr., Rep.	22,452	20.42%	Won
Jeremiah Chiappelli, Dem.	12,943	11.77%	Lost
Justin M. Towles, Dem.	11,968	10.89%	Lost
Robert L. Eckert, Dem.	11,856	10.78%	Lost
Other Write-Ins	105	0.1%	

- 2014 Republican Primary Election for Maryland House of Delegates – District 31B

Voters to choose two:

Name	Votes	Percent	Outcome
Nic Kipke, Rep.	3,920	31.00%	Won
Meagan Simonaire, Rep.	3,075	24.30%	Won
Gus Kurtz, Rep.	1,779	14.10%	Lost
Brian A. Chisholm, Rep.	1,607	12.70%	Lost
Faith M. Loudon, Rep.	1,017	8.10%	Lost
Don Dwyer Jr., Rep.	890	7.00%	Lost
Paul William Drgos Jr., Rep.	230	1.80%	Lost
David Lee Therrien, Rep.	111	0.90%	Lost
