= Joan Cadden (politician) =

American politician (born 1941)

Member of the Maryland House of Delegates
- In office 1991–2007
- Constituency: District 31

Member of the Anne Arundel County Board of Education
- In office 1988–1990

Personal details
- Born: August 17, 1941 (age 85) Baltimore, Maryland, US
- Party: Democratic
- Education: Marinello Schools of Beauty

Joan Cadden (born August 17, 1941) is a beautician and former politician from Maryland.

She was a Democratic member of the Maryland House of Delegates in District 31 from 1991 to 2007. Cadden was a member of the Anne Arundel County Board of Education from 1988 to 1990.

Cadden lost re-election in 2006.

== Personal life ==
Cadden was born in Baltimore in 1941. From 1967 to 1969, Cadden attended Marinello Comer School of Cosmetology. She was the owner and operator of her own cosmetology business. She is married and has four children.

Cadden currently resides in Brooklyn Park, Maryland.

== Legislative notes ==
- Voted for slots in 2005 (HB1361)

== Election results ==
- 2006 Race for Maryland House of Delegates – 31st District

Voters to choose three:

Name	Votes	Percent	Outcome
Steve Schuh, Rep.	19,049	18.4%	Won
Nicholaus R. Kipke, Rep.	18,150	17.5%	Won
Donald H. Dwyer, Jr., Rep.	17,558	17.0%	Won
Thomas J. Fleckenstein, Dem.	16,654	16.1%	Lost
Craig A. Reynolds, Dem.	14,454	14.0%	Lost
Joan Cadden, Dem.	17,533	16.9%	Lost
Other Write-Ins	75	0.1%	

- 2002 Race for Maryland House of Delegates – District 31

Voters to choose three:

Name	Votes	Percent	Outcome
John R. Leopold, Rep.	24,937	24.31%	Won
Joan Cadden, Dem.	16,906	16.48%	Won
Donald Dwyer, Jr., Rep.	16,807	16.39%	Won
Thomas R. Gardner, Rep.	15,321	14.94%	Lost
Mary Rosso, Dem.	15,127	14.75%	Lost
Thomas J. Fleckenstein, Dem.	13,404	13.07%	Lost

- 1998 Race for Maryland House of Delegates – District 31

Voters to choose three:

Name	Votes	Percent	Outcome
John R. Leopold, Rep.	21,632	23%	Won
Joan Cadden, Dem.	19,214	20%	Won
Mary Rosso, Dem.	15,372	16%	Won
Victoria L. Schade, Rep.	15,366	16%	Lost
Robert Schaeffer, Rep.	12,092	14%	Lost
Thomas J. Fleckenstein, Dem.	11,862	12%	Lost

- 1994 Race for Maryland House of Delegates – District 31

Voters to choose three:

Name	Votes	Percent	Outcome
John R. Leopold, Rep.	19,960	24%	Won
Joan Cadden, Dem.	16,492	20%	Won
Victoria L. Schade, Rep.	14,801	18%	Won
W. Ray Huff, Dem.	14,203	17%	Lost
C. Stokes Kolodziejski, Dem.	13,176	16%	Lost
Douglas Arnold, Rep.	3,586	4%	Lost
