= 2022 Maryland House of Delegates election =

- November 8, 2022

All 141 seats in the Maryland House of Delegates 71 seats needed for a majority
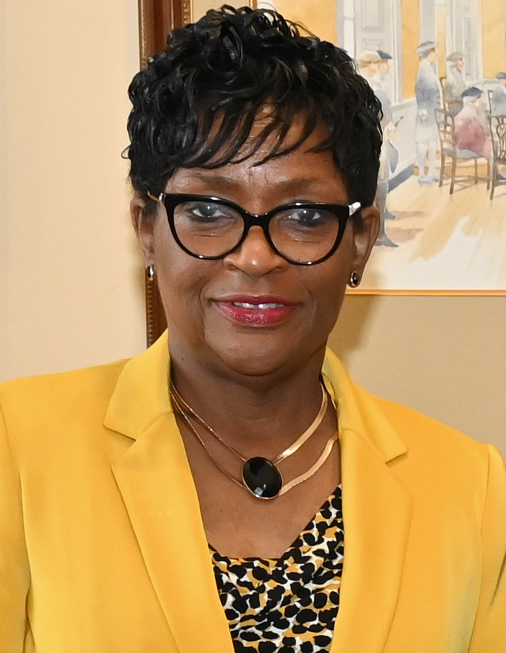

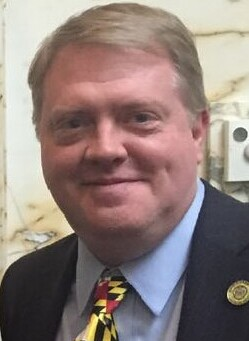
	Majority party	Minority party
Leader	Adrienne A. Jones	Jason C. Buckel
Party	Democratic	Republican
Leader since	April 7, 2019	April 13, 2021
Leader's seat	10th	1B
Last election	99	42
Seats won	102	39
Seat change	▲3	▼3
Popular vote	2,579,561	1,208,564
Percentage	67.36%	31.56%
Swing	▲1.86%	▼1.04%
- Democratic gain Republican gain Democratic hold Republican hold Democrats: 50–60% 60–70% 70–80% 80–90% >90% Republicans: 50–60% 60–70% 70–80% >90%
Speaker before election
Adrienne A. Jones
Democratic
Elected Speaker
Adrienne A. Jones
Democratic

The 2022 Maryland House of Delegates election was held on November 8, 2022, electing all 141 members of the chamber. This coincided with the election of all 47 of Maryland's state senators, along with other statewide offices. The Democratic and Republican primaries were held on July 19, 2022.

Democrats gained three seats, increasing their supermajority to 102 out of 141 seats. Simultaneously with gains in the state senate and Wes Moore's win in the gubernatorial race, Democrats won a trifecta in the state for the first time since 2010.

== Overview ==
Party	Candidates	Votes		Seats		
Party	Candidates	No.	%	Before	After	+/–
Democratic	198	2,579,561	67.36%	99	102	▲3
Republican	129	1,208,564	31.56%	42	39	▼3
Libertarian	2	9,180	0.24%	0	0	
Green	3	5,410	0.14%	0	0	
Total		3,829,443	100.00	141	141	

=== Summary by district ===
District	2020 Pres.	Incumbent	Party	District	2020 Pres.	Elected	Party
1A	R+56.3	Wendell Beitzel	Rep	1A	R+51.1	Jim Hinebaugh	Rep
1B	R+36.0	Jason Buckel	Rep	1B	R+33.7	Jason Buckel (Note: Ran unopposed in the general election.)	Rep
1C	R+44.9	Mike McKay	Rep	1C	R+47.5	Terry Baker	Rep
2A	R+25.1	William Wivell	Rep	2A	R+25.6	William Wivell	Rep
2A	R+25.1	Neil Parrott	Rep	2A	R+25.6	William Valentine	Rep
2B	D+13.2	Brenda Thiam (Note: Thiam was appointed on October 6, 2020 to succeed Republican Paul D. Corderman, who was appointed to the Maryland Senate on September 1, 2020.)	Rep	2B	D+12.5	Brooke Grossman	Dem
3A	D+35.8	Karen Lewis Young	Dem	3	D+34.1	Kris Fair	Dem
3A	D+35.8	Carol Krimm	Dem	3	D+34.1	Karen Simpson	Dem
3B	D+18.2	Ken Kerr	Dem	3	D+34.1	Ken Kerr	Dem
4	R+10.4	Barrie Ciliberti	Rep	4	R+4.9	Barrie Ciliberti	Rep
4	R+10.4	Dan Cox	Rep	4	R+4.9	April Fleming Miller	Rep
4	R+10.4	Jesse Pippy	Rep	4	R+4.9	Jesse Pippy	Rep
5	R+27.0	Susan Krebs	Rep	5	R+21.1	Christopher Eric Bouchat	Rep
5	R+27.0	April Rose	Rep	5	R+21.1	April Rose	Rep
5	R+27.0	Haven Shoemaker	Rep	5	R+21.1	Chris Tomlinson	Rep
6	R+13.4	Robin Grammer Jr.	Rep	6	R+14.8	Robin Grammer Jr.	Rep
6	R+13.4	Bob Long	Rep	6	R+14.8	Bob Long	Rep
6	R+13.4	Ric Metzgar	Rep	6	R+14.8	Ric Metzgar	Rep
7	R+21.0	Kathy Szeliga	Rep	7A	R+9.5	Kathy Szeliga	Rep
7	R+21.0	Richard Impallaria	Rep	7A	R+9.5	Ryan Nawrocki	Rep
7	R+21.0	Lauren Arikan	Rep	7B	R+25.4	Lauren Arikan	Rep
8	D+19.9	Harry Bhandari	Dem	8	D+25.7	Harry Bhandari	Dem
8	D+19.9	Carl Jackson (Note: Jackson was appointed on October 21, 2019 to succeed Democrat Eric M. Bromwell, who resigned on September 6, 2019.)	Dem	8	D+25.7	Carl Jackson	Dem
8	D+19.9	Joseph Boteler III	Rep	8	D+25.7	Nick Allen	Dem
9A	D+10.8	Trent Kittleman	Rep	9A	D+21.1	Natalie Ziegler	Dem
9A	D+10.8	Reid Novotny (Note: Novotny was appointed on January 13, 2021 to succeed Republican Warren E. Miller, who resigned on December 30, 2020.)	Rep	9A	D+21.1	Chao Wu	Dem
9B	D+41.5	Courtney Watson	Dem	9B	D+42.9	Courtney Watson	Dem
10	D+64.4	Benjamin Brooks	Dem	10	D+59.2	Jennifer White	Dem
10	D+64.4	Jay Jalisi	Dem	10	D+59.2	N. Scott Phillips	Dem
10	D+64.4	Adrienne Jones	Dem	10	D+59.2	Adrienne Jones	Dem
11	D+42.3	Lisa Belcastro (Note: Belcastro was appointed on March 10, 2020 to succeed Democrat Shelly L. Hettleman, who was appointed to the Maryland Senate on February 3, 2020.)	Dem	11A	D+62.5	Cheryl Pasteur	Dem
11	D+42.3	Jon Cardin	Dem	11B	D+32.6	Jon Cardin	Dem
11	D+42.3	Dana Stein	Dem	11B	D+32.6	Dana Stein	Dem
12	D+39.2	Terri Hill	Dem	12A	D+52.8	Terri Hill	Dem
12	D+39.2	Jessica Feldmark	Dem	12A	D+52.8	Jessica Feldmark	Dem
12	D+39.2	Eric Ebersole	Dem	12B	D+13.7	Gary Simmons	Dem
13	D+53.3	Vanessa Atterbeary	Dem	13	D+53.5	Vanessa Atterbeary	Dem
13	D+53.3	Shane Pendergrass	Dem	13	D+53.5	Pam Guzzone	Dem
13	D+53.3	Jennifer Terrasa	Dem	13	D+53.5	Jennifer Terrasa	Dem
14	D+46.9	Anne Kaiser	Dem	14	D+49.4	Anne Kaiser	Dem
14	D+46.9	Eric Luedtke	Dem	14	D+49.4	Eric Luedtke	Dem
14	D+46.9	Pamela Queen	Dem	14	D+49.4	Pamela Queen	Dem
15	D+50.4	Linda Foley (Note: Foley was appointed on December 17, 2021 to succeed Democrat Kathleen Dumais, who resigned on November 5, 2021.)	Dem	15	D+50.4	Linda Foley	Dem
15	D+50.4	David Fraser-Hidalgo	Dem	15	D+50.4	David Fraser-Hidalgo	Dem
15	D+50.4	Lily Qi	Dem	15	D+50.4	Lily Qi	Dem
16	D+65.9	Ariana Kelly	Dem	16	D+66.0	Ariana Kelly	Dem
16	D+65.9	Marc Korman	Dem	16	D+66.0	Marc Korman	Dem
16	D+65.9	Sara Love	Dem	16	D+66.0	Sara Love	Dem
17	D+59.8	Kumar Barve	Dem	17	D+60.0	Kumar Barve	Dem
17	D+59.8	Julie Palakovich Carr	Dem	17	D+60.0	Julie Palakovich Carr	Dem
17	D+59.8	James Gilchrist	Dem	17	D+60.0	Joe Vogel	Dem
18	D+68.5	Alfred Carr Jr.	Dem	18	D+68.5	Aaron Kaufman	Dem
18	D+68.5	Emily Shetty	Dem	18	D+68.5	Emily Shetty	Dem
18	D+68.5	Jared Solomon	Dem	18	D+68.5	Jared Solomon	Dem
19	D+54.6	Charlotte Crutchfield	Dem	19	D+55.2	Charlotte Crutchfield	Dem
19	D+54.6	Bonnie Cullison	Dem	19	D+55.2	Bonnie Cullison	Dem
19	D+54.6	Vaughn Stewart	Dem	19	D+55.2	Vaughn Stewart	Dem
20	D+78.8	Lorig Charkoudian	Dem	20	D+78.8	Lorig Charkoudian	Dem
20	D+78.8	David Moon	Dem	20	D+78.8	David Moon	Dem
20	D+78.8	Jheanelle Wilkins	Dem	20	D+78.8	Jheanelle Wilkins	Dem
21	D+55.6	Ben Barnes	Dem	21	D+59.0	Ben Barnes	Dem
21	D+55.6	Mary Lehman	Dem	21	D+59.0	Mary Lehman	Dem
21	D+55.6	Joseline Peña-Melnyk	Dem	21	D+59.0	Joseline Peña-Melnyk	Dem
22	D+78.5	Anne Healey	Dem	22	D+78.1	Anne Healey	Dem
22	D+78.5	Alonzo Washington	Dem	22	D+78.1	Alonzo Washington	Dem
22	D+78.5	Nicole Williams (Note: Williams was appointed on December 6, 2019 to succeed Democrat Tawanna P. Gaines, who resigned on October 4, 2019.)	Dem	22	D+78.1	Nicole Williams	Dem
23A	D+68.0	Geraldine Valentino-Smith	Dem	23	D+73.9	Adrian Boafo	Dem
23B	D+76.1	Marvin Holmes Jr.	Dem	23	D+73.9	Marvin Holmes Jr.	Dem
23B	D+76.1	Cheryl Landis (Note: Landis was appointed on October 8, 2021 to succeed Democrat Ron Watson, who was appointed to the Maryland Senate on August 31, 2021.)	Dem	23	D+73.9	Kym Taylor	Dem
24	D+87.9	Faye Martin Howell (Note: Howell was appointed on November 12, 2021 to succeed Democrat Erek Barron, who was appointed to serve as United States Attorney for the District of Maryland on October 7, 2021.)	Dem	24	D+87.1	Tiffany Alston	Dem
24	D+87.9	Andrea Harrison	Dem	24	D+87.1	Andrea Harrison	Dem
24	D+87.9	Jazz Lewis	Dem	24	D+87.1	Jazz Lewis	Dem
25	D+89.3	Darryl Barnes	Dem	25	D+88.9	Darryl Barnes	Dem
25	D+89.3	Nick Charles	Dem	25	D+88.9	Nick Charles	Dem
25	D+89.3	Karen Toles (Note: Toles was appointed on January 12, 2022 to succeed Democrat Dereck E. Davis, who was appointed Treasurer of Maryland on December 17, 2021.)	Dem	25	D+88.9	Karen Toles	Dem
26	D+84.6	Veronica Turner	Dem	26	D+84.7	Veronica Turner	Dem
26	D+84.6	Kris Valderrama	Dem	26	D+84.7	Kris Valderrama	Dem
26	D+84.6	Jay Walker	Dem	26	D+84.7	Jamila Woods	Dem
27A	D+63.2	Susie Proctor	Dem	27A	D+61.3	Kevin Harris	Dem
27B	D+27.4	Rachel Jones (Note: Jones was appointed on February 17, 2021 to succeed Democrat Michael Jackson, who was appointed to the Maryland Senate on January 13, 2021.)	Dem	27B	D+30.3	Jeffrie Long Jr.	Dem
27C	R+5.4	Mark Fisher	Rep	27C	R+9.1	Mark Fisher	Rep
28	D+41.9	Debra Davis	Dem	28	D+39.0	Debra Davis	Dem
28	D+41.9	Edith Patterson	Dem	28	D+39.0	Edith Patterson	Dem
28	D+41.9	C. T. Wilson	Dem	28	D+39.0	C. T. Wilson	Dem
29A	R+32.5	Matthew Morgan	Rep	29A	R+32.4	Matthew Morgan	Rep
29B	D+10.3	Brian Crosby	Dem	29B	D+12.4	Brian Crosby	Dem
29C	R+8.5	Jerry Clark	Rep	29C	R+9.9	Todd Morgan	Rep
30A	D+33.7	Shaneka Henson (Note: Henson was appointed on May 16, 2019 to succeed Democrat Michael E. Busch, who died on April 7, 2019.)	Dem	30A	D+33.0	Shaneka Henson	Dem
30A	D+33.7	Dana Jones (Note: Jones was appointed on May 1, 2020 to succeed Democrat Alice J. Cain, who resigned on March 18, 2020.)	Dem	30A	D+33.0	Dana Jones	Dem
30B	R+6.5	Seth Howard	Rep	30B	R+6.5	Seth Howard	Rep
31A	D+13.5	Ned Carey	Dem	31	R+10.7	Rachel Muñoz	Rep
31B	R+17.7	Brian Chisholm	Rep	31	R+10.7	Brian Chisholm	Rep
31B	R+17.7	Nic Kipke	Rep	31	R+10.7	Nic Kipke	Rep
32	D+33.3	J. Sandy Bartlett	Dem	32	D+32.3	J. Sandy Bartlett	Dem
32	D+33.3	Mark Chang	Dem	32	D+32.3	Mark Chang	Dem
32	D+33.3	Mike Rogers	Dem	32	D+32.3	Mike Rogers	Dem
33	D+13.3	Sid Saab	Rep	33A	D+36.1	Andrew Pruski	Dem
33	D+13.3	Rachel Muñoz (Note: Muñoz was appointed on November 8, 2021 to succeed Republican Michael E. Malone, who resigned on October 1, 2021.)	Rep	33B	D+9.8	Stuart Schmidt Jr.	Rep
33	D+13.3	Heather Bagnall	Dem	33C	D+13.7	Heather Bagnall	Dem
34A	D+19.6	Mary Ann Lisanti	Dem	34A	D+19.3	Andre Johnson Jr.	Dem
34A	D+19.6	Steven Johnson	Dem	34A	D+19.3	Steven Johnson	Dem
34B	R+9.3	Susan McComas	Rep	34B	R+8.4	Susan McComas	Rep
35A	R+23.8	Kevin Hornberger	Rep	35A	R+32.8	Teresa Reilly	Rep
35B	R+35.3	Mike Griffith (Note: Griffith was appointed on January 7, 2020 to succeed Republican Andrew Cassilly, who resigned on December 11, 2019.)	Rep	35A	R+32.8	Mike Griffith	Rep
35B	R+35.3	Teresa Reilly	Rep	35B	R+20.0	Kevin Hornberger	Rep
36	R+21.3	Steven Arentz	Rep	36	R+20.0	Steven Arentz	Rep
36	R+21.3	Jefferson Ghrist	Rep	36	R+20.0	Jefferson Ghrist	Rep
36	R+21.3	Jay Jacobs	Rep	36	R+20.0	Jay Jacobs	Rep
37A	D+34.0	Sheree Sample-Hughes	Dem	37A	D+29.1	Sheree Sample-Hughes	Dem
37B	R+15.4	Christopher Adams	Rep	37B	R+16.0	Christopher Adams	Rep
37B	R+15.4	Johnny Mautz	Rep	37B	R+16.0	Tom Hutchinson	Rep
38A	R+10.5	Charles Otto	Rep	38A	R+12.9	Charles Otto	Rep
38B	D+3.2	Carl Anderton Jr.	Rep	38B	D+6.1	Carl Anderton Jr.	Rep
38C	R+28.9	Wayne Hartman	Rep	38C	R+28.4	Wayne Hartman	Rep
39	D+56.0	Gabriel Acevero	Dem	39	D+56.1	Gabriel Acevero	Dem
39	D+56.0	Lesley Lopez	Dem	39	D+56.1	Lesley Lopez	Dem
39	D+56.0	Kirill Reznik	Dem	39	D+56.1	Kirill Reznik	Dem
40	D+81.5	Marlon Amprey (Note: Amprey was appointed on January 13, 2021 to succeed Democrat Nick Mosby, who was elected President of the Baltimore City Council on December 10, 2020.)	Dem	40	D+83.7	Marlon Amprey	Dem
40	D+81.5	Frank Conaway Jr.	Dem	40	D+83.7	Frank Conaway Jr.	Dem
40	D+81.5	Melissa Wells	Dem	40	D+83.7	Melissa Wells	Dem
41	D+71.6	Dalya Attar	Dem	41	D+71.9	Dalya Attar	Dem
41	D+71.6	Tony Bridges	Dem	41	D+71.9	Tony Bridges	Dem
41	D+71.6	Samuel Rosenberg	Dem	41	D+71.9	Samuel Rosenberg	Dem
42A	D+51.5	Cathi Forbes (Note: Forbes was appointed on October 29, 2019 to succeed Democrat Stephen W. Lafferty, who resigned on September 6, 2019.)	Dem	42A	R+10.3	Nino Mangione	Rep
42B	D+7.5	Michele Guyton	Dem	42B	D+26.6	Michele Guyton	Dem
42B	D+7.5	Nino Mangione	Rep	42C	R+30.4	Joshua Stonko	Rep
43	D+85.0	Curt Anderson	Dem	43A	D+87.2	Elizabeth Embry	Dem
43	D+85.0	Regina Boyce	Dem	43A	D+87.2	Regina Boyce	Dem
43	D+85.0	Maggie McIntosh	Dem	43B	D+52.9	Cathi Forbes	Dem
44A	D+88.1	Roxane Prettyman (Note: Prettyman was appointed on August 23, 2021 to succeed Democrat Keith E. Haynes, who resigned on July 15, 2021.)	Dem	44A	D+22.7	Eric Ebersole	Dem
44B	D+65.2	Sheila Ruth (Note: Ruth was appointed on January 31, 2020 to succeed Democrat Charles E. Sydnor III, who was appointed to the Maryland Senate on January 8, 2020.)	Dem	44B	D+60.2	Sheila Ruth	Dem
44B	D+65.2	Pat Young	Dem	44B	D+60.2	Aletheia McCaskill	Dem
45	D+81.1	Chanel Branch (Note: Branch was appointed on January 28, 2020 to succeed Democrat Cheryl Glenn, who resigned on December 18, 2019.)	Dem	45	D+80.8	Caylin Young	Dem
45	D+81.1	Talmadge Branch	Dem	45	D+80.8	Jackie Addison	Dem
45	D+81.1	Stephanie Smith	Dem	45	D+80.8	Stephanie Smith	Dem
46	D+62.2	Luke Clippinger	Dem	46	D+63.1	Luke Clippinger	Dem
46	D+62.2	Robbyn Lewis	Dem	46	D+63.1	Robbyn Lewis	Dem
46	D+62.2	Brooke Lierman	Dem	46	D+63.1	Mark Edelson	Dem
47A	D+78.6	Diana Fennell	Dem	47A	D+82.4	Diana Fennell	Dem
47A	D+78.6	Julian Ivey	Dem	47A	D+82.4	Julian Ivey	Dem
47B	D+78.6	Wanika Fisher	Dem	47B	D+76.7	Deni Taveras	Dem

== Retiring incumbents ==
=== Democrats ===
20 Democrats retired.

1. District 3A: Carol L. Krimm retired.
2. District 3A: Karen Lewis Young retired to run for state senator in District 3.
3. District 10: Benjamin Brooks retired to run for state senator in District 10.
4. District 10: Jay Jalisi retired to run for state senator in District 10.
5. District 13: Shane Pendergrass retired.
6. District 17: James W. Gilchrist retired.
7. District 18: Alfred C. Carr Jr. retired to run for Montgomery County Council in District 4.
8. District 23A: Geraldine Valentino-Smith retired.
9. District 23B: Cheryl S. Landis retired.
10. District 24: Faye Martin Howell retired.
11. District 26: Jay Walker retired.
12. District 31A: Ned Carey retired.
13. District 34A: Mary Ann Lisanti retired to run for state senator in District 34.
14. District 43: Curt Anderson retired.
15. District 43: Maggie McIntosh retired.
16. District 44A: Roxane L. Prettyman retired.
17. District 44B: Pat Young retired to run for the Baltimore County Council in District 1.
18. District 45: Talmadge Branch retired.
19. District 46: Brooke Lierman retired to run for comptroller.
20. District 47B: Wanika B. Fisher retired to run for the Prince George's County Council in District 2.

=== Republicans ===
10 Republicans retired.

1. District 1A: Wendell R. Beitzel retired.
2. District 1C: Mike McKay retired to run for state senator in District 1.
3. District 2A: Neil Parrott retired to run for Congress in Maryland's 6th congressional district.
4. District 4: Dan Cox retired to run for governor.
5. District 5: Susan W. Krebs retired.
6. District 5: Haven Shoemaker retired to run for Carroll County state's attorney.
7. District 9A: Reid Novotny retired to run for state senator in District 9.
8. District 29C: Jerry Clark retired.
9. District 33: Sid Saab retired to run for state senator in District 33.
10. District 37B: Johnny Mautz retired to run for state senator in District 37.

== Predictions ==
Source	Ranking	As of
Sabato's Crystal Ball	Safe D	May 19, 2022

== Incumbents defeated ==
=== In primaries ===
==== Democrats ====
1. District 11B: Lisa Belcastro lost renomination to Jon S. Cardin and Dana Stein.
2. District 27A: Susie Proctor lost renomination to Kevin Harris.
3. District 27B: Rachel Jones lost renomination to Jeffrie Long.
4. District 45: Chanel Branch lost renomination to Jackie Addison, Stephanie M. Smith, and Caylin Young.

==== Republicans ====
1. District 7A: Joseph C. Boteler III lost renomination to Kathy Szeliga and Ryan Nawrocki.
2. District 7B: Richard Impallaria lost renomination to Lauren Arikan.

=== In the general election ===
==== Republicans ====
- District 2B: Brenda Thiam lost to Brooke Grossman.
- District 9A: Trent Kittleman lost to Natalie Ziegler and Chao Wu.

== List of districts ==
All election results are from the Maryland Board of Elections.

=== District 1A ===
The new District 1A encompasses all of Garrett County and part of Allegany County. Four-term Republican incumbent Wendell R. Beitzel, who was re-elected in 2018 with 77.6 percent of the vote, announced on August 9, 2021, that he would not run for re-election to a fifth term.

Primary results by precinct Hinebaugh: 40–50%; 50–60%; 60–70%; 70–80%; Thomas: 40–50%

Republican primary results
Party	Candidate	Votes	%
Republican	Jim Hinebaugh Jr.	3,900	58.5
Republican	Tim Thomas	2,184	32.7
Republican	Andy Adams	488	7.3
Republican	Kenneth Linn Sisk	98	1.5

Democratic primary results
Party	Candidate	Votes	%
Democratic	Robert Spear	1,422	100.0

Results by precinct Hinebaugh: 50–60%; 60–70%; 70–80%; 80–90%; >90%

2022 Maryland's 1A House of Delegates district election
Party	Candidate	Votes	%
Republican	Jim Hinebaugh Jr.	11,971	77.25%
Democratic	Robert Spear	2,829	18.26%
Libertarian	Monique M. Mehring	671	4.33%
Write-in		25	0.16%
Total votes		15,496	100.00%
Republican hold			

=== District 1B ===
The new District 1B encompasses the city of Cumberland and parts of Frostburg, both in Allegany County. Two-term Republican incumbent Jason C. Buckel, who was re-elected in 2018 with 62.6 percent of the vote, was running for a third term unopposed.

Republican primary results
Party	Candidate	Votes	%
Republican	Jason C. Buckel (incumbent)	3,808	100.0

Results by precinct Buckel: >90%

2022 Maryland's 1B House of Delegates district election
Party	Candidate	Votes	%
Republican	Jason C. Buckel (incumbent)	11,209	96.40%
Write-in		419	3.60%
Total votes		11,628	3.60%
Republican hold			

=== District 1C ===
The new District 1C includes east Allegany and west Washington counties. Two-term Republican incumbent Mike McKay, who was re-elected in 2018 with 82.1 percent of the vote, announced on July 21, 2021, that he would run for state Senate instead of seeking a third term.

Republican primary results
Party	Candidate	Votes	%
Republican	Terry L. Baker	4,078	100.0

Democratic primary results
Party	Candidate	Votes	%
Democratic	Carrie R. Hinton	1,483	100.0

Results by precinct Baker: 50–60%; 60–70%; 70–80%; 80–90%; Hinton: 50–60%

2022 Maryland's 1C House of Delegates district election
Party	Candidate	Votes	%
Republican	Terry L. Baker	11,336	75.95%
Democratic	Carrie R. Hinton	3,287	22.02%
Green	Charlotte McBrearty	297	1.99%
Write-in		6	0.04%
Total votes		14,926	100.00%
Republican hold			

=== District 2A ===
The new District 2A includes east Washington and north Frederick counties. While two-term Republican incumbent William J. Wivell, who was re-elected in 2018 with 34.7 percent of the vote, was running for a third term, two-term Republican incumbent Neil Parrott, who was re-elected in 2018 with 40.0 percent of the vote, announced on November 17, 2021, that he would run for Congress in Maryland's 6th congressional district instead of running for a third term.

Republican primary results
Party	Candidate	Votes	%
Republican	William J. Wivell (incumbent)	5,751	42.9
Republican	William Valentine	3,069	22.9
Republican	Seth Edward Wilson	2,340	17.5
Republican	Bradley Belmont	2,235	16.7

Results by precinct Republicans: 80–90%; >90%; Write-ins: 50–60%

2022 Maryland's 2A House of Delegates district election
Party	Candidate	Votes	%
Republican	William Valentine	19,839	49.59%
Republican	William J. Wivell (incumbent)	19,458	48.64%
Write-in		711	1.78%
Total votes		40,008	100.00%
Republican hold			
Republican hold			

=== District 2B ===
The new District 2B encompasses the city of Hagerstown in Washington County. Republican incumbent Brenda J. Thiam was running for a full term after being appointed to the seat on October 6, 2020, following the appointment of Paul D. Corderman, who was re-elected in 2018 with 51.9 percent of the vote, to the Maryland Senate.

Republican primary results by precinct Thiam: 50–60%; 60–70%; >90%; Stolz: 50–60%; 60–70%; >90%

Republican primary results
Party	Candidate	Votes	%
Republican	Brenda J. Thiam (incumbent)	916	54.2
Republican	Thomas Stolz	773	45.8

Democratic primary results by precinct Grossman: 50–60%; 60–70%; >90%; Robinson: 60–70%; Tie

Democratic primary results
Party	Candidate	Votes	%
Democratic	Brooke Grossman	1,167	61.3
Democratic	Ladetra Robinson	738	38.7

Results by precinct Grossman: 50–60%; 60–70%; 70–80%; Thiam: 50–60%

2022 Maryland's 2B House of Delegates district election
Party	Candidate	Votes	%
Democratic	Brooke Grossman	5,001	54.15%
Republican	Brenda J. Thiam (incumbent)	4,222	45.72%
Write-in		12	0.13%
Total votes		9,235	100.00%
Democratic gain from Republican			

=== District 3 ===
The new 3rd district encompasses the city of Frederick in Frederick County. The 2020 redistricting cycle saw districts 3A and 3B merge to form one district. First-term Democratic incumbent Kenneth P. Kerr, who was re-elected in 2018 with 52.4 percent of the vote, was running for re-election, while two-term incumbents Karen Lewis Young and Carol L. Krimm, who were re-elected in 2018 with 31.4 and 31.3 percent of the vote respectively, were retiring. Young announced on June 26, 2021, that she would run for state Senate in District 3 instead of seeking a third term.

Democratic primary results
Party	Candidate	Votes	%
Democratic	Kenneth P. Kerr (incumbent)	5,628	19.8
Democratic	Kris Fair	5,598	19.7
Democratic	Karen Simpson	4,450	15.6
Democratic	Josh Bokee	3,618	12.7
Democratic	Tarolyn C. Thrasher	3,489	12.3
Democratic	William "Billy" Reid	3,295	11.6
Democratic	Stephen Slater	2,364	8.3

Republican primary results
Party	Candidate	Votes	%
Republican	Justin Wages	3,893	50.5
Republican	Kathy Diener	3,813	49.5

Results by precinct Democrats: 50–60%; 60–70%; 70–80%; 80–90%; Republicans: 50–60%; 60–70%

2022 Maryland's 3rd House of Delegates district election
Party	Candidate	Votes	%
Democratic	Kenneth P. Kerr (incumbent)	26,270	24.91%
Democratic	Karen Simpson	25,945	24.60%
Democratic	Kris Fair	25,602	24.27%
Republican	Kathy Diener	13,699	12.99%
Republican	Justin Wages	13,535	12.83%
Write-in		429	0.41%
Total votes		105,480	100.00%
Democratic hold			
Democratic hold			
Democratic hold			

=== District 4 ===
The new 4th district includes most of Frederick County, not including the northern part of the county nor the city of Frederick. Two-term incumbent Barrie Ciliberti and first-term incumbent Jesse Pippy, both Republicans who won with 19.7 and 19.2 percent of the vote respectively, were running for their third and second terms respectively, while first-term Republican incumbent Dan Cox, who was elected in 2018 with 20.6 percent of the vote, announced on July 4, 2021, that he would run for governor.

Republican primary results
Party	Candidate	Votes	%
Republican	Jesse Pippy (incumbent)	10,450	33.4
Republican	April Fleming Miller	8,055	25.8
Republican	Barrie Ciliberti (incumbent)	7,361	23.5
Republican	Heath S. Barnes	5,398	17.3

Democratic primary results
Party	Candidate	Votes	%
Democratic	Andrew J. Duck	7,764	34.3
Democratic	Millicent A. Hall	7,703	34.1
Democratic	Brandon Duck	7,137	31.6

Results by precinct Republicans: 50–60%; 60–70%; 70–80%; 80–90%; Democrats: 50–60%; 60–70%

2022 Maryland's 4th House of Delegates district election
Party	Candidate	Votes	%
Republican	Jesse Pippy (incumbent)	30,670	19.09%
Republican	April Fleming Miller	29,717	18.50%
Republican	Barrie Ciliberti (incumbent)	29,705	18.49%
Democratic	Andrew J. Duck	24,489	15.24%
Democratic	Millicent A. Hall	23,361	14.54%
Democratic	Brandon Duck	22,628	14.08%
Write-in		93	0.06%
Total votes		160,663	100.00%
Republican hold			
Republican hold			
Republican hold			

=== District 5 ===
The new 5th district encompasses most of Carroll County, including Eldersburg and Westminster. Two-term incumbent April Rose, who was re-elected in 2018 with 26.8 percent of the vote, was running for a third term, while two-term incumbents Susan W. Krebs and Haven Shoemaker, who were re-elected in 2018 with 30.9 and 26.5 percent of the vote respectively, were retiring. Shoemaker announced on July 20, 2021, that he would run for Carroll County state's attorney instead of a third term.

Republican primary results
Party	Candidate	Votes	%
Republican	April Rose (incumbent)	8,636	22.6
Republican	Chris Tomlinson	6,847	17.9
Republican	Christopher Eric Bouchat	4,620	12.1
Republican	Sallie B. Taylor	4,470	11.7
Republican	Stephen A. Wantz	4,373	11.4
Republican	Dennis E. Frazier	3,563	9.3
Republican	Scott Willens	3,765	9.8
Republican	Scott Jendrek	1,993	5.2

Results by precinct Republicans: 80–90%; >90%

2022 Maryland's 5th House of Delegates district election
Party	Candidate	Votes	%
Republican	April Rose (incumbent)	33,971	33.11%
Republican	Christopher Eric Bouchat	33,286	32.44%
Republican	Chris Tomlinson	32,485	31.66%
Write-in		2,872	2.80%
Total votes		102,614	100.00%
Republican hold			
Republican hold			
Republican hold			

=== District 6 ===
The new 6th district encompasses southeast Baltimore County, including Dundalk, Essex, and Edgemere. Two-term Republican incumbents Robert B. Long, Robin Grammer Jr., and Richard W. Metzgar, who were re-elected in 2018 with 19.7, 19.5, and 19.2 percent of the vote respectively, were all running for re-election to a third term.

Republican primary results
Party	Candidate	Votes	%
Republican	Richard W. Metzgar (incumbent)	3,902	25.1
Republican	Robin Grammer Jr. (incumbent)	3,728	24.0
Republican	Robert B. Long (incumbent)	3,511	22.6
Republican	Tim Fazenbaker	1,192	12.3
Republican	Valerie McDonough	1,701	10.9
Republican	Robert H. Bird	573	3.7
Republican	Chike Anyanwu	216	1.4

Democratic primary results
Party	Candidate	Votes	%
Democratic	Megan Ann Mioduszewski	4,718	52.4
Democratic	Jake Mohorovic, III	4,280	47.6

Results by precinct Republicans: 50–60%; 60–70%; 70–80%; 80–90%; Democrats: 50–60%; 60–70%; 80–90%

2022 Maryland's 6th House of Delegates district election
Party	Candidate	Votes	%
Republican	Richard W. Metzgar (incumbent)	16,696	23.60%
Republican	Robin Grammer Jr. (incumbent)	16,344	23.10%
Republican	Robert B. Long (incumbent)	15,987	22.60%
Democratic	Megan Ann Mioduszewski	11,300	15.97%
Democratic	Jake Mohorovic, III	10,109	14.29%
Write-in		304	0.43%
Total votes		70,740	100.00%
Republican hold			
Republican hold			
Republican hold			

=== District 7A ===
Following the 2020 redistricting cycle, District 7 was split into two districts, 7A and 7B. 8th District incumbent Joseph C. Boteler III, who was elected in 2018 with 16.7 percent of the vote, was drawn into the new District 7A, where he was running for a second term. Kathy Szeliga, who was re-elected in 2018 with 25.4 percent of the vote, was running for a third term in District 7A. The new District 7A encompasses east Baltimore County, including Kingsville and Bowleys Quarters.

Republican primary results
Party	Candidate	Votes	%
Republican	Kathy Szeliga (incumbent)	4,979	36.9
Republican	Ryan Nawrocki	3,719	27.6
Republican	Steve Redmer	2,792	20.7
Republican	Joseph C. Boteler III (incumbent)	1,987	14.7

Democratic primary results
Party	Candidate	Votes	%
Democratic	Ly Xīnzhèn M. Zhǎngsūn Brown	5,569	100.0

Results by precinct Republicans: 60–70%; 70–80%; 80–90%; >90%

2022 Maryland's 7A House of Delegates district election
Party	Candidate	Votes	%
Republican	Kathy Szeliga (incumbent)	18,034	37.14%
Republican	Ryan Nawrocki	17,859	36.78%
Democratic	Ly Xīnzhèn M. Zhǎngsūn Brown	12,371	25.48%
Write-in		295	0.61%
Total votes		48,559	100.00%
Republican hold			
Republican hold			

=== District 7B ===
Following the 2020 redistricting cycle, District 7 was split into two districts, 7A and 7B. First-term incumbent Lauren Arikan and fifth-term incumbent Richard Impallaria, both Republicans who won in 2018 with 23.3 and 22.5 percent of the vote respectively, were running for re-election to a second and sixth term. The new 7B district runs along the borders of Baltimore and Harford counties.

Republican primary results by precinct Arikan: 40–50%; 50–60%; 60–70%

Republican primary results
Party	Candidate	Votes	%
Republican	Lauren Arikan (incumbent)	3,014	53.2
Republican	Richard Impallaria (incumbent)	1,942	34.3
Republican	Russ English, Jr.	292	5.2
Republican	Rocky Wagonhurst	208	3.7
Republican	Nicholas Gladden	205	3.6

Democratic primary results
Party	Candidate	Votes	%
Democratic	Medford J. Campbell, III	2,311	100.0

Results by precinct Arikan: 50–60%; 60–70%; 70–80%

2022 Maryland's 7B House of Delegates district election
Party	Candidate	Votes	%
Republican	Lauren Arikan (incumbent)	12,915	67.23%
Democratic	Medford J. Campbell, III	6,267	32.62%
Write-in		29	0.15%
Total votes		19,211	100.00%
Republican hold			

=== District 8 ===
The new 8th district consists of part of Baltimore County, including Perry Hall and Parkville. Democratic incumbents Carl W. Jackson, who was appointed to the seat on October 21, 2019, following the resignation of state delegate Eric M. Bromwell, and first-term incumbent Harry Bhandari, who was elected in 2018 with 17.7 percent of the vote, were running for re-election. Republican incumbent Joseph C. Boteler III was redrawn into District 7A, where he was running for a second term.

Democratic primary results
Party	Candidate	Votes	%
Democratic	Carl W. Jackson (incumbent)	7,712	34.0
Democratic	Harry Bhandari (incumbent)	7,678	33.8
Democratic	Nick Allen	7,306	32.2

Republican primary results
Party	Candidate	Votes	%
Republican	Timothy M. Neubauer	2,672	28.7
Republican	Kathleen A. Smero	2,629	28.2
Republican	Glen Geelhaar	2,609	28.0
Republican	Manpreet K. Hundal	1,404	15.1

Results by precinct Democrats: 50–60%; 60–70%; 70–80%; 80–90%; >90%

2022 Maryland's 8th House of Delegates district election
Party	Candidate	Votes	%
Democratic	Harry Bhandari (incumbent)	19,702	21.62%
Democratic	Carl W. Jackson (incumbent)	18,950	20.79%
Democratic	Nick Allen	18,062	19.82%
Republican	Kathleen A. Smero	11,838	12.99%
Republican	Timothy M. Neubauer	11,259	12.36%
Republican	Glen Geelhaar	11,243	12.34%
Write-in		74	0.08%
Total votes		91,128	100.00%
Democratic hold			
Democratic hold			
Democratic gain from Republican			

=== District 9A ===
The new District 9A encompasses north Howard County, including Cooksville, Lisbon, and Clarksville, and part of Montgomery County. Two-term Republican incumbent Trent Kittleman, who was re-elected in 2018 with 30.6 percent of the vote, was running for a third term while Reid Novotny, who was appointed to the seat on January 13, 2021, following the resignation of Warren E. Miller, announced on January 11, 2022, that he would run for state Senate instead of seeking a full term.

Republican primary results
Party	Candidate	Votes	%
Republican	Trent Kittleman (incumbent)	4,612	50.4
Republican	Jianning Jenny Zeng	2,531	27.6
Republican	Saif Rehman	2,015	22.0

Democratic primary results
Party	Candidate	Votes	%
Democratic	Natalie Ziegler	5,308	41.8
Democratic	Chao Wu	3,942	31.0
Democratic	Steven M. Bolen	3,448	27.2

Results by precinct Democrats: 50–60%; 60–70%; 70–80%; Republicans: 50–60%; 60–70%

2022 Maryland's 9A House of Delegates district election
Party	Candidate	Votes	%
Democratic	Natalie Ziegler	17,767	26.68
Democratic	Chao Wu	17,486	26.43
Republican	Trent Kittleman (incumbent)	17,373	26.26
Republican	Jianning Zeng	13,609	20.56
Write-in		44	0.07
Total votes		66,168	100.00
Democratic gain from Republican			
Democratic gain from Republican			

=== District 9B ===
The new District 9B includes all of Ellicott City in Howard County. First-term Democratic incumbent Courtney Watson, who was elected in 2018 with 57.4 percent of the vote, was running for a second term.

Democratic primary results
Party	Candidate	Votes	%
Democratic	Courtney Watson (incumbent)	4,561	100.0

Republican primary results
Party	Candidate	Votes	%
Republican	Lisa Kim	1,642	100.0

Results by precinct Watson: 50–60%; 60–70%; 70–80%

2022 Maryland's 9B House of Delegates district election
Party	Candidate	Votes	%
Democratic	Courtney Watson (incumbent)	11,287	65.90%
Republican	Lisa Kim	5,826	34.01%
Write-in		15	0.09%
Total votes		17,128	100.00%
Democratic hold			

=== District 10 ===
The new 10th district encompasses east Baltimore County, including Randallstown and Reisterstown. Six-term Democratic incumbent Adrienne A. Jones, who was re-elected in 2018 with 27.4 percent of the vote, was running for a seventh term, while two-term Democratic incumbents Benjamin Brooks and Jay Jalisi, who were re-elected in 2018 with 26.8 and 26.4 percent of the vote respectively, both announced that they would run for state Senate in the 10th district instead of seek a third term.

Democratic primary results
Party	Candidate	Votes	%
Democratic	Adrienne A. Jones (incumbent)	12,591	28.7
Democratic	Jennifer White	8,410	19.2
Democratic	N. Scott Phillips	5,161	11.8
Democratic	Ruben Amaya	4,249	9.7
Democratic	Michael T. Brown, Sr.	4,085	9.3
Democratic	Korey T. Johnson	3,823	8.7
Democratic	Regg J. Hatcher, Jr.	2,347	5.4
Democratic	Nathaniel Logan	1,601	3.7
Democratic	Nathaniel Maurice Costley, Sr.	970	2.2
Democratic	Garland M. Jarratt Sanderson	612	1.4

Republican primary results
Party	Candidate	Votes	%
Republican	Patricia R. Fallon	2,021	53.1
Republican	Jordan Porompyae	1,784	46.9

Results by precinct Democrats: 50–60%; 60–70%; 70–80%; 80–90%; >90%

2022 Maryland's 10th House of Delegates district election
Party	Candidate	Votes	%
Democratic	Adrienne A. Jones (incumbent)	29,842	29.42%
Democratic	Jennifer White	27,925	27.53%
Democratic	N. Scott Phillips	26,643	26.27%
Republican	Patricia R. Fallon	9,024	8.90%
Republican	Jordan Porompyae	7,685	7.58%
Write-in		304	0.30%
Total votes		101,423	100.00%
Democratic hold			
Democratic hold			
Democratic hold			

=== District 11A ===
Following the 2020 redistricting cycle, District 11 was split into two districts, 11A and 11B. All incumbents were drawn into 11B, creating an open seat. The new District 11A encompasses central Baltimore County, stretching from Garrison to Cockeysville.

Democratic primary results
Party	Candidate	Votes	%
Democratic	Cheryl E. Pasteur	4,556	100.0

Results by precinct Pasteur: >90%

2022 Maryland's 11A House of Delegates district election
Party	Candidate	Votes	%
Democratic	Cheryl Pasteur	10,290	98.34%
Write-in		174	1.66%
Total votes		10,464	100.00%
Democratic hold			

=== District 11B ===
Following the 2020 redistricting cycle, District 11 was split into two districts, 11A and 11B. The new District 11B encompasses central Baltimore County, including Pikesville and Mays Chapel. First-term incumbent Jon S. Cardin and four-term incumbent Dana Stein, both Democrats who were elected in 2018 with 29.3 and 26.9 percent of the vote respectively, and incumbent Lisa Belcastro, who was appointed to the seat on March 10, 2020, after Shelly L. Hettleman was appointed to the Maryland Senate, were running for re-election.

Democratic primary results
Party	Candidate	Votes	%
Democratic	Jon S. Cardin (incumbent)	8,895	36.9
Democratic	Dana Stein (incumbent)	8,819	36.5
Democratic	Lisa Belcastro (incumbent)	6,427	26.6

Republican primary results
Party	Candidate	Votes	%
Republican	Jim Simpson	2,815	51.5
Republican	Tyler A. Stiff	2,652	48.5

Results by precinct Democrats: 50–60%; 60–70%; 70–80%; 80–90%; >90%; Republicans: 50–60%

2022 Maryland's 11B House of Delegates district election
Party	Candidate	Votes	%
Democratic	Dana Stein (incumbent)	22,115	34.86%
Democratic	Jon S. Cardin (incumbent)	21,536	33.95%
Republican	Jim Simpson	10,640	16.77%
Republican	Tyler A. Stiff	9,072	14.30%
Write-in		70	0.11%
Total votes		63,433	100.00%
Democratic hold			
Democratic hold			

=== District 12A ===
Following the 2020 redistricting cycle, District 12 was split into two districts, 12A and 12B. The new District 12A encompasses part of Howard County, including Columbia and Hanover. Two-term incumbent Terri L. Hill and first-term incumbent Jessica Feldmark, who won election in 2018 with 21.8 and 21.9 percent of the vote respectively, were running for re-election.

Democratic primary results
Party	Candidate	Votes	%
Democratic	Terri L. Hill (incumbent)	9,107	47.2
Democratic	Jessica Feldmark (incumbent)	8,619	44.7
Democratic	Christopher John Feldwick	1,561	8.1

Results by precinct Democrats: >90%

2022 Maryland's 12A House of Delegates district election
Party	Candidate	Votes	%
Democratic	Terri L. Hill (incumbent)	24,204	53.05%
Democratic	Jessica Feldmark (incumbent)	20,674	45.31%
Write-in		745	1.63%
Total votes		45,623	100.00%
Democratic hold			
Democratic hold			

=== District 12B ===
Following the 2020 redistricting cycle, District 12 was split into two districts, 12A and 12B. The new District 12B encompasses part of north Anne Arundel County, including parts of Brooklyn Park and Glen Burnie. Two-term Democratic incumbent Ned Carey, who was re-elected in 2018 with 56.8 percent of the vote, was drawn into District 12B from District 31A, but announced on April 15, 2022, that he would not seek re-election to a third term.

Democratic primary results
Party	Candidate	Votes	%
Democratic	Gary Simmons	829	34.7
Democratic	Daniel J. McGinty	809	33.9
Democratic	Jeff Garcia	751	31.4

Republican primary results
Party	Candidate	Votes	%
Republican	Ashley P. Arias	505	38.1
Republican	David R. Buchanan	485	36.6
Republican	Victor Henderson	214	16.2
Republican	Ronald A. Imbragulio, Sr.	121	9.1

Results by precinct Simmons: 50–60%; 60–70%; 70–80%; Arias: 50–60%

2022 Maryland's 12B House of Delegates district election
Party	Candidate	Votes	%
Democratic	Gary Simmons	5,856	55.41%
Republican	Ashley Arias	4,692	44.40%
Write-in		20	0.19%
Total votes		10,568	100.00%
Democratic hold			

=== District 13 ===
The new 13th district encompasses south Howard County. Two-term incumbent Vanessa Atterbeary and first-term incumbent Jennifer R. Terrasa, who were re-elected in 2018 with 30.7 and 27.1 percent of the vote respectively, were running for re-election. Seven-term Democratic incumbent Shane Pendergrass, who was re-elected in 2018 with 28.4 percent of the vote, announced on November 29, 2021, that she would not run for re-election to an eighth term.

Democratic primary results
Party	Candidate	Votes	%
Democratic	Vanessa Atterbeary (incumbent)	11,663	29.9
Democratic	Jennifer R. Terrasa (incumbent)	9,249	23.7
Democratic	Pam Lanman Guzzone	7,760	19.9
Democratic	Amy R. Brooks	6,756	17.3
Democratic	Becca Niburg	3,561	9.1

Republican primary results
Party	Candidate	Votes	%
Republican	Chris Yates	2,995	53.1
Republican	Padraic Walsh	2,645	46.9

Results by precinct Democrats: 60–70%; 70–80%; 80–90%

2022 Maryland's 13th House of Delegates district election
Party	Candidate	Votes	%
Democratic	Vanessa Atterbeary (incumbent)	33,045	27.85%
Democratic	Jennifer R. Terrasa (incumbent)	31,259	26.35%
Democratic	Pam Lanman Guzzone	31,128	26.24%
Republican	Chris Yates	11,874	10.01%
Republican	Padraic Walsh	10,792	9.10%
Write-in		539	0.45%
Total votes		118,637	100.00%
Democratic hold			
Democratic hold			
Democratic hold			

=== District 14 ===
The new 14th district runs along the border of Howard and Montgomery counties, including Olney. Fifth-term incumbent Anne Kaiser, first-term incumbent Pamela E. Queen, and three-term incumbent Eric Luedtke, all Democrats who won re-election in 2018 with 24.5, 23.4, and 22.8 percent of the vote respectively, were running for re-election.

Democratic primary results
Party	Candidate	Votes	%
Democratic	Anne Kaiser (incumbent)	12,843	29.0
Democratic	Pamela E. Queen (incumbent)	12,038	27.2
Democratic	Eric Luedtke (incumbent)	10,824	24.4
Democratic	Tom B. Smith	5,564	12.6
Democratic	Joshua Dowling	3,050	6.9

Republican primary results
Party	Candidate	Votes	%
Republican	Kathy Gugulis	3,097	50.7
Republican	Kate Walshe	3,013	49.3

Results by precinct Democrats: 50–60%; 60–70%; 70–80%; 80–90%; >90%

2022 Maryland's 14th House of Delegates district election
Party	Candidate	Votes	%
Democratic	Anne Kaiser (incumbent)	31,659	26.89
Democratic	Eric Luedtke (incumbent)	30,547	25.94
Democratic	Pamela E. Queen (incumbent)	30,304	25.73
Republican	Kathy Gugulis	12,614	10.71
Republican	Kate Walshe	12,282	10.43
Write-in		351	0.30
Total votes		117,757	100.00
Democratic hold			
Democratic hold			
Democratic hold			

=== District 15 ===
The new 15th district encompasses east Montgomery County, including North Potomac and parts of Germantown. First-term incumbent Lily Qi and two-term incumbent David Fraser-Hidalgo, both Democrats who were elected in 2018 with 23.6 and 22.9 percent of the vote respectively, and incumbent Linda Foley, who was appointed to the seat on December 17, 2021, following the resignation of state delegate Kathleen Dumais, were all running for re-election.

Democratic primary results
Party	Candidate	Votes	%
Democratic	Lily Qi (incumbent)	12,293	31.4
Democratic	Linda Foley (incumbent)	11,002	28.1
Democratic	David Fraser-Hidalgo (incumbent)	10,726	27.4
Democratic	Saqib Ali	5,145	13.1

Republican primary results
Party	Candidate	Votes	%
Republican	Matt Wade	2,592	33.8
Republican	Stacey Sauter	2,578	33.6
Republican	Jodi Colella Noah	2,494	32.5

Results by precinct Democrats: 50–60%; 60–70%; 70–80%; 80–90%

2022 Maryland's 15th House of Delegates district election
Party	Candidate	Votes	%
Democratic	Lily Qi (incumbent)	31,145	24.55
Democratic	Linda Foley (incumbent)	31,007	24.44
Democratic	David Fraser-Hidalgo (incumbent)	30,229	23.83
Republican	Stacey Sauter	11,969	9.43
Republican	Matt Wade	11,330	8.93
Republican	Jodi Colella Noah	11,087	8.74
Write-in		96	0.08
Total votes		126,863	100.00
Democratic hold			
Democratic hold			
Democratic hold			

=== District 16 ===
The new 16th district consists of south Montgomery County, including Potomac and parts of Bethesda. Three-term incumbent Ariana Kelly, two-term incumbent Marc Korman, and first-term incumbent Sara N. Love, all Democrats who were elected in 2018 with 30.6, 29.4, and 29.4 percent of the vote, were running for re-election unopposed.

Democratic primary results
Party	Candidate	Votes	%
Democratic	Marc Korman (incumbent)	19,650	33.6
Democratic	Sara N. Love (incumbent)	19,547	33.4
Democratic	Ariana Kelly (incumbent)	19,375	33.1

Results by precinct Democrats: >90%

2022 Maryland's 16th House of Delegates district election
Party	Candidate	Votes	%
Democratic	Ariana Kelly (incumbent)	41,600	33.06
Democratic	Marc Korman (incumbent)	41,506	32.99
Democratic	Sara N. Love (incumbent)	41,153	32.70
Write-in		1,572	1.25
Total votes		125,831	100.00
Democratic hold			
Democratic hold			
Democratic hold			

=== District 17 ===
The new 17th district consists of Rockville and Gaithersburg. Eight-term incumbent Kumar P. Barve and first-term incumbent Julie Palakovich Carr, both Democrats who were elected in 2018 with 30.5 and 29.5 percent of the vote respectively, were running for re-election. Four-term Democratic incumbent James W. Gilchrist announced on September 3, 2021, that he would not seek re-election to a fifth term in 2022.

Democratic primary results
Party	Candidate	Votes	%
Democratic	Julie Palakovich Carr (incumbent)	11,058	31.7
Democratic	Kumar P. Barve (incumbent)	10,324	29.6
Democratic	Joe Vogel	9,745	27.9
Democratic	Joe De Maria	3,770	10.8

Republican primary results
Party	Candidate	Votes	%
Republican	Donald "DP" Patti	1,716	50.6
Republican	Helene F. Meister	1,676	49.4

Results by precinct Democrats: 80–90%; >90%

2022 Maryland's 17th House of Delegates district election
Party	Candidate	Votes	%
Democratic	Julie Palakovich Carr (incumbent)	28,463	28.58
Democratic	Kumar P. Barve (incumbent)	27,995	28.11
Democratic	Joe Vogel	27,414	27.53
Republican	Helene F. Meister	7,835	7.87
Republican	Donald "DP" Patti	7,560	7.59
Write-in		324	0.33
Total votes		99,591	100.00
Democratic hold			
Democratic hold			
Democratic hold			

=== District 18 ===
The new 18th district consists of Bethesda, Chevy Chase, Wheaton, and Kensington. First-term Democratic incumbents Emily Shetty and Jared Solomon, who were elected in 2018 with 30.4 and 28.0 percent of the vote respectively, were running for a second term.

Four-term Democratic incumbent Alfred C. Carr Jr., who won re-election in 2018 with 30.1 percent of the vote, announced on April 15, 2022, that he would not run for re-election for a fifth term and would instead run for the Montgomery County Council in District 4. Carr made this announcement hours before the Board of Elections' candidate filing deadline, so no candidates were able to file to run for the District 18 House seat left open by Carr. As a result, the Montgomery County Democratic Central Committee voted on April 21, 2022, to select Aaron Kaufman to run for the seat.

Democratic primary results
Party	Candidate	Votes	%
Democratic	Emily Shetty (incumbent)	15,747	34.5
Democratic	Jared Solomon (incumbent)	15,239	33.4
Democratic	Aaron M. Kaufman	14,698	32.2

Republican primary results
Party	Candidate	Votes	%
Republican	George M. Cecala	1,532	100.0

Results by precinct Democrats: 80–90%; >90%

2022 Maryland's 18th House of Delegates district election
Party	Candidate	Votes	%
Democratic	Emily Shetty (incumbent)	32,621	30.98
Democratic	Aaron M. Kaufman	30,860	29.31
Democratic	Jared Solomon (incumbent)	30,711	29.17
Republican	George M. Cecala	7,390	7.02
Green	Jon Foreman	3,422	3.25
Write-in		292	0.28
Total votes		105,296	100.00
Democratic hold			
Democratic hold			
Democratic hold			

=== District 19 ===
The new 19th district includes Aspen Hill, Leisure World, and Redland. First-term Democratic incumbents Charlotte Crutchfield and Vaughn Stewart, and third-term incumbent Bonnie Cullison, all of whom were elected in 2018 with 25.7, 24.3, and 25.1 percent of the vote respectively, were running for re-election in 2022.

Democratic primary results
Party	Candidate	Votes	%
Democratic	Charlotte Crutchfield (incumbent)	12,833	32.0
Democratic	Bonnie Cullison (incumbent)	12,645	31.5
Democratic	Vaughn Stewart (incumbent)	11,815	29.5
Democratic	Augustin Esquivar Saah	2,790	7.0

Republican primary results
Party	Candidate	Votes	%
Republican	Frank Nice	2,436	100.0

Results by precinct Democrats: 80–90%; >90%

2022 Maryland's 19th House of Delegates district election
Party	Candidate	Votes	%
Democratic	Charlotte Crutchfield (incumbent)	28,082	30.10
Democratic	Bonnie Cullison (incumbent)	27,746	29.74
Democratic	Vaughn Stewart (incumbent)	27,032	28.98
Republican	Frank Nice	10,035	10.76
Write-in		392	0.42
Total votes		93,287	100.00
Democratic hold			
Democratic hold			
Democratic hold			

=== District 20 ===
The new 20th district includes Silver Spring, White Oak, and Takoma Park. Two-term Democratic incumbent David Moon and first-term incumbents Jheanelle Wilkins and Lorig Charkoudian, who were elected in 2018 with 35.0, 33.1, and 31.3 percent of the vote respectively, were all running for re-election.

Democratic primary results
Party	Candidate	Votes	%
Democratic	David Moon (incumbent)	16,572	32.7
Democratic	Jheanelle Wilkins (incumbent)	15,679	30.9
Democratic	Lorig Charkoudian (incumbent)	14,948	29.5
Democratic	John Walsh	3,550	7.0

Results by precinct Democrats: >90%

2022 Maryland's 20th House of Delegates district election
Party	Candidate	Votes	%
Democratic	David Moon (incumbent)	31,489	33.78
Democratic	Jheanelle Wilkins (incumbent)	30,862	33.11
Democratic	Lorig Charkoudian (incumbent)	30,130	32.32
Write-in		735	0.79
Total votes		93,216	100.00
Democratic hold			
Democratic hold			
Democratic hold			

=== District 21 ===
The new 21st district includes parts of Prince George's and Anne Arundel counties, including College Park, Laurel, and Beltsville. First-term Democratic incumbent Mary A. Lehman and four-term incumbents Ben Barnes and Joseline Peña-Melnyk, who were elected in 2018 with 26.3, 25.7, and 25.6 percent of the vote respectively, were all running for re-election unopposed.

Democratic primary results
Party	Candidate	Votes	%
Democratic	Joseline Peña-Melnyk (incumbent)	9,502	33.7
Democratic	Mary A. Lehman (incumbent)	9,381	33.2
Democratic	Ben Barnes (incumbent)	9,335	33.1

Results by precinct Democrats: >90%

2022 Maryland's 21st House of Delegates district election
Party	Candidate	Votes	%
Democratic	Mary A. Lehman (incumbent)	22,333	33.63
Democratic	Joseline Peña-Melnyk (incumbent)	21,821	32.86
Democratic	Ben Barnes (incumbent)	21,531	32.42
Write-in		720	1.08
Total votes		66,405	100.00
Democratic hold			
Democratic hold			
Democratic hold			

=== District 22 ===
The new 22nd district consists of Hyattsville, Greenbelt, and Riverdale Park. Two-term Democratic incumbents Alonzo T. Washington and eight-term incumbent Anne Healey, who were re-elected in 2018 with 31.2 and 29.9 percent of the vote respectively, and incumbent Nicole A. Williams, who was appointed to the seat on December 6, 2019, following the resignation of Tawanna P. Gaines, were all running for re-election.

Democratic primary results
Party	Candidate	Votes	%
Democratic	Alonzo T. Washington (incumbent)	9,809	30.4
Democratic	Nicole A. Williams (incumbent)	8,250	25.5
Democratic	Anne Healey (incumbent)	5,280	16.3
Democratic	Ashanti Martinez	4,494	13.9
Democratic	Patrick A. Paschall	2,510	7.8
Democratic	Chiquita Jackson	1,967	6.1

Results by precinct Democrats: >90%

2022 Maryland's 22nd House of Delegates district election
Party	Candidate	Votes	%
Democratic	Alonzo T. Washington (incumbent)	21,165	34.47
Democratic	Nicole A. Williams (incumbent)	20,311	33.08
Democratic	Anne Healey (incumbent)	19,036	31.00
Write-in		896	1.46
Total votes		61,408	100.00
Democratic hold			
Democratic hold			
Democratic hold			

=== District 23 ===
Following the 2020 redistricting cycle, House of Delegates districts 23A and 23B were merged into one district. The new 23rd district runs along the border of Prince George's and Anne Arundel counties, including Upper Marlboro, Bowie, and South Laurel. Fifth-term incumbent Marvin E. Holmes Jr., who was re-elected in 2018 with 48.3 percent of the vote, was running for a sixth term, while third-term incumbent Geraldine Valentino-Smith, who was re-elected in 2018 with 74.9 percent of the vote, and Cheryl S. Landis, who was appointed to the seat on October 8, 2021, after Ron Watson was appointed to the Maryland Senate in District 23, were both not seeking re-election in 2022.

Democratic primary results
Party	Candidate	Votes	%
Democratic	Marvin E. Holmes Jr. (incumbent)	10,382	16.2
Democratic	Adrian Boafo	9,237	14.4
Democratic	Kym Taylor	8,957	14.0
Democratic	Jocelyn Irene Collins	8,938	13.9
Democratic	Monica Roebuck	7,609	11.9
Democratic	Keenon James	6,104	9.5
Democratic	Remi Duyile	3,888	6.1
Democratic	Januari McKay	3,784	5.9
Democratic	Valeria Tomlin	2,630	4.1
Democratic	Jacqui Steele-McCall	2,575	4.0

Results by precinct Democrats: >90%

2022 Maryland's 23rd House of Delegates district election
Party	Candidate	Votes	%
Democratic	Marvin E. Holmes Jr. (incumbent)	36,506	33.89
Democratic	Kym Taylor	36,399	33.80
Democratic	Adrian Boafo	33,843	31.42
Write-in		957	0.89
Total votes		107,705	100.00
Democratic hold			
Democratic hold			
Democratic hold			

=== District 24 ===
The new 24th district consists of Seat Pleasant, Springdale, and Lake Arbor. First-term Democratic incumbents Andrea Harrison and Jazz Lewis, who were elected in 2018 with 31.7 and 31.0 percent of the vote respectively, were both running for re-election. Faye Martin Howell, who was appointed to the seat on November 12, 2021, after Erek Barron resigned to be sworn in as the United States Attorney for the District of Maryland, did not file to run for re-election in 2022.

Democratic primary results
Party	Candidate	Votes	%
Democratic	Jazz Lewis (incumbent)	11,315	21.7
Democratic	Andrea Harrison (incumbent)	9,595	18.4
Democratic	Tiffany T. Alston	7,920	15.2
Democratic	LaTasha R. Ward	7,819	15.0
Democratic	Christopher Stevenson	7,789	15.0
Democratic	Alexis S. Solis	4,255	8.2
Democratic	Richard DeShay Elliott	1,867	3.6
Democratic	Sennieal Crutchfield	1,582	3.0

Results by precinct Democrats: >90%

2022 Maryland's 24th House of Delegates district election
Party	Candidate	Votes	%
Democratic	Tiffany T. Alston	29,212	33.60
Democratic	Andrea Harrison (incumbent)	28,880	33.21
Democratic	Jazz Lewis (incumbent)	28,396	32.66
Write-in		461	0.53
Total votes		86,949	100.00
Democratic hold			
Democratic hold			
Democratic hold			

=== District 25 ===
The new 25th district consists of Forestville, Westphalia, and Kettering. Two-term Democratic incumbent Darryl Barnes and first-term incumbent Nick Charles, who won re-election in 2018 with 34.8 and 31.5 percent of the vote respectively, and incumbent Karen Toles, who was appointed to the seat on January 12, 2022, after Dereck E. Davis was elected Treasurer of Maryland, were all running for re-election unopposed.

Democratic primary results
Party	Candidate	Votes	%
Democratic	Darryl Barnes (incumbent)	19,227	35.2
Democratic	Karen Toles (incumbent)	17,980	32.9
Democratic	Nick Charles (incumbent)	17,434	31.9

Results by precinct Democrats: >90%

2022 Maryland's 25th House of Delegates district election
Party	Candidate	Votes	%
Democratic	Darryl Barnes (incumbent)	31,906	34.43
Democratic	Karen Toles (incumbent)	30,886	33.33
Democratic	Nick Charles (incumbent)	29,519	31.85
Write-in		356	0.38
Total votes		92,667	100.00
Democratic hold			
Democratic hold			
Democratic hold			

=== District 26 ===
The new 26th district consists of Friendly, Oxon Hill, and Fort Washington. First-term Democratic incumbent Veronica L. Turner and four-term incumbent Kris Valderrama, who were elected in 2018 with 35.1 and 32.0 percent of the vote, were running for re-election, while four-term incumbent Jay Walker announced on March 2, 2022, that he would not seek re-election to a fifth term in 2022.

Democratic primary results
Party	Candidate	Votes	%
Democratic	Veronica L. Turner (incumbent)	11,004	20.0
Democratic	Kris Valderrama (incumbent)	10,107	18.4
Democratic	Jamila J. Woods	9,451	17.2
Democratic	Antwan C. Brown	7,524	13.7
Democratic	Angela R. Jones	5,633	10.3
Democratic	Andre D. Nottingham	3,904	7.1
Democratic	Kendal Wade	7,282	13.3

Republican primary results
Party	Candidate	Votes	%
Republican	JoAnn Fisher	618	100.0

Results by precinct Democrats: 80–90%; >90%

2022 Maryland's 26th House of Delegates district election
Party	Candidate	Votes	%
Democratic	Veronica L. Turner (incumbent)	30,612	33.77
Democratic	Jamila Woods	29,335	32.36
Democratic	Kris Valderrama (incumbent)	27,068	29.86
Republican	JoAnn Fisher	3,438	3.79
Write-in		193	0.21
Total votes		90,646	100.00
Democratic hold			
Democratic hold			
Democratic hold			

=== District 27A ===
The new District 27A encompasses part of north Charles and south Prince George's counties, including Waldorf, Bryantown, and Danville. First-term Democratic incumbent Susie Proctor, who was elected to a full term in 2018 with 98.2 percent of the vote, was running for a second term.

Democratic primary results
Party	Candidate	Votes	%
Democratic	Kevin M. Harris	3,292	55.9
Democratic	Susie Proctor (incumbent)	2,594	44.1

Results by precinct Harris: >90%

2022 Maryland's 27A House of Delegates district election
Party	Candidate	Votes	%
Democratic	Kevin M. Harris	11,783	97.99
Write-in		242	2.01
Total votes		12,025	100.00
Democratic hold			

=== District 27B ===
The new District 27B encompasses parts of south Prince George's and north Calvert counties, including Chesapeake Beach and Baden. Democratic incumbent Rachel Jones, who was appointed to the seat on February 17, 2021, after Michael Jackson was appointed to the Maryland Senate in District 27, was running for a full term.

Democratic primary results
Party	Candidate	Votes	%
Democratic	Jeffrie E. Long Jr.	3,158	54.3
Democratic	Rachel Jones (incumbent)	2,345	40.3
Democratic	June Jones	310	5.3

Results by precinct Long: 80–90%; >90%

2022 Maryland's 27B House of Delegates district election
Party	Candidate	Votes	%
Democratic	Jeffrie Long Jr.	12,227	95.31
Write-in		602	4.69
Total votes		12,829	100.00
Democratic hold			

=== District 27C ===
The new District 27C encompasses most of Calvert County, excluding its northernmost and southernmost points. Three-term Republican incumbent Mark N. Fisher, who was re-elected in 2018 with 55.8 percent of the vote, was running for a fourth term.

Republican primary results
Party	Candidate	Votes	%
Republican	Mark N. Fisher (incumbent)	4,296	77.5
Republican	Kevin D. Merillat	1,245	22.5

Results by precinct Fisher: >90%

2022 Maryland's 27B House of Delegates district election
Party	Candidate	Votes	%
Republican	Mark N. Fisher (incumbent)	13,474	95.67%
Write-in		610	4.33%
Total votes		14,084	100.00%
Republican hold			

=== District 28 ===
The new 28th district encompasses most of Charles County. First-term Democratic incumbent Debra Davis, two-term incumbent Edith J. Patterson, and third-term incumbent C. T. Wilson, who were all elected in 2018 with 23.8, 23.2, and 22.8 percent of the vote respectively, were all running for re-election.

Democratic primary results
Party	Candidate	Votes	%
Democratic	C. T. Wilson (incumbent)	10,444	25.3
Democratic	Edith J. Patterson (incumbent)	10,484	25.4
Democratic	Debra Davis (incumbent)	9,889	24.0
Democratic	Buddy Bowling, Jr.	4,529	11.0
Democratic	Edward Holland	3,287	8.0
Democratic	Cornell T. Posey	2,653	6.4

Republican primary results
Party	Candidate	Votes	%
Republican	James Ashburn	3,460	38.9
Republican	Marquita Bushrod	2,833	31.9
Republican	Tyrone R. Hall	2,597	29.2

Results by precinct Democrats: 50–60%; 60–70%; 70–80%; 80–90%; >90%; Republicans: 50–60%; 60–70%; 70–80%

2022 Maryland's 28th House of Delegates district election
Party	Candidate	Votes	%
Democratic	Debra Davis (incumbent)	28,394	23.17%
Democratic	C. T. Wilson (incumbent)	27,959	22.82%
Democratic	Edith J. Patterson (incumbent)	27,792	22.68%
Republican	James Ashburn	13,867	11.32%
Republican	Marquita Bushrod	12,673	10.34%
Republican	Tyrone R. Hall	11,697	9.55%
Write-in		160	0.13%
Total votes		122,542	100.00%
Democratic hold			
Democratic hold			
Democratic hold			

=== District 29A ===
The new District 29A encompasses north St. Mary's County, including Charlotte Hall and Leonardtown. Two-term Republican incumbent Matthew Morgan, who was re-elected in 2018 with 69.0 percent of the vote, was running for a third term unopposed.

Republican primary results
Party	Candidate	Votes	%
Republican	Matthew Morgan (incumbent)	4,753	100.0

Results by precinct Morgan: >90%

2022 Maryland's 29A House of Delegates district election
Party	Candidate	Votes	%
Republican	Matthew Morgan (incumbent)	12,663	97.38%
Write-in		341	2.62%
Total votes		13,004	100.00%
Republican hold			

=== District 29B ===
The new District 29B encompasses south St. Mary's County, including California, Scotland, and Lexington Park. First-term Democratic incumbent Brian M. Crosby, who was elected in 2018 with 53.4 percent of the vote, was running for a second term.

Democratic primary results
Party	Candidate	Votes	%
Democratic	Brian M. Crosby (incumbent)	2,075	80.4
Democratic	Valarie Alisha Dove-Swaringer	507	19.6

Republican primary results
Party	Candidate	Votes	%
Republican	Deb Rey	2,241	100.0

Results by precinct Crosby: 50–60%; 60–70%; Rey: 50–60%

2022 Maryland's 29B House of Delegates district election
Party	Candidate	Votes	%
Democratic	Brian M. Crosby (incumbent)	6,596	55.80%
Republican	Deb Rey	5,210	44.07%
Write-in		15	0.13%
Total votes		11,821	100.00%
Democratic hold			

=== District 29C ===
The new District 29C includes central St. Mary's and south Calvert counties, including Lusby, Beauvue, and Drayden. First-term Republican incumbent Jerry Clark, who was re-elected in 2018 with 57.0 percent of the vote, announced on January 12, 2022, that he would not seek re-election to a second term in 2022.

Republican primary results
Party	Candidate	Votes	%
Republican	Todd B. Morgan	3,249	64.8
Republican	Timothy E. Gowen	1,766	35.2

Democratic primary results
Party	Candidate	Votes	%
Democratic	Bill Bates	2,629	100.0

Results by precinct Morgan: 50–60%; 60–70%; 70–80%

2022 Maryland's 29C House of Delegates district election
Party	Candidate	Votes	%
Republican	Todd B. Morgan	10,604	61.66%
Democratic	Bill Bates	6,561	38.15%
Write-in		32	0.19%
Total votes		17,197	100.00%
Republican hold			

=== District 30A ===
The new District 30A includes the city of Annapolis and surrounding areas. Democratic incumbents Dana Jones, who was appointed to the seat on May 1, 2020, following the resignation of state delegate Alice J. Cain, and Shaneka Henson, who was appointed to the seat on May 16, 2019, following the resignation of state delegate Michael E. Busch, were both running for re-election to their first full terms.

Democratic primary results
Party	Candidate	Votes	%
Democratic	Shaneka Henson (incumbent)	8,665	52.2
Democratic	Dana Jones (incumbent)	7,925	47.8

Republican primary results
Party	Candidate	Votes	%
Republican	Doug Rathell	3,883	53.1
Republican	Rob Seyfferth	3,434	46.9

Results by precinct Democrats: 50–60%; 60–70%; 70–80%; 80–90%

2022 Maryland's 30A House of Delegates district election
Party	Candidate	Votes	%
Democratic	Shaneka Henson (incumbent)	20,364	32.09%
Democratic	Dana Jones (incumbent)	19,710	31.06%
Republican	Doug Rathell	12,948	20.41%
Republican	Rob Seyfferth	10,366	16.34%
Write-in		66	0.10%
Total votes		63,454	100.00%
Democratic hold			
Democratic hold			

=== District 30B ===
The new District 30B includes south Anne Arundel County, including Friendship, Lothian, and Galesville. Two-term Republican incumbent Seth A. Howard, who was re-elected in 2018 with 54.4 percent of the vote, was running for a third term.

Republican primary results
Party	Candidate	Votes	%
Republican	Seth A. Howard (incumbent)	3,379	100.0

Democratic primary results
Party	Candidate	Votes	%
Democratic	Courtney L. Buiniskis	3,153	100.0

Results by precinct Howard: 50–60%; 60–70%; Buiniskis: 50–60%

2022 Maryland's 30B House of Delegates district election
Party	Candidate	Votes	%
Republican	Seth A. Howard (incumbent)	10,234	56.72%
Democratic	Courtney L. Buiniskis	7,804	43.25%
Write-in		6	0.03%
Total votes		18,044	100.00%
Republican hold			

=== District 31 ===
Following the 2020 redistricting cycle, House of Delegates districts 31A and 31B were merged into one district. The new 31st district encompasses north Anne Arundel County, including Pasadena, Severn, and Gambrills. First-term Republican incumbent Brian Chisholm and four-term incumbent Nic Kipke, who were elected in 2018 with 33.2 and 33.0 percent of the vote respectively, were running for re-election. 33rd district incumbent Rachel Muñoz, who was appointed to the seat on November 8, 2021, following the resignation of Michael E. Malone, was also drawn into the 31st district, where she was running for re-election to a full term in 2022.

Republican primary results
Party	Candidate	Votes	%
Republican	Nic Kipke (incumbent)	8,764	33.0
Republican	Brian Chisholm (incumbent)	8,261	31.1
Republican	Rachel Muñoz (incumbent)	7,067	26.6
Republican	LaToya Nkongolo	2,465	9.3

Democratic primary results
Party	Candidate	Votes	%
Democratic	Kevin Burke	6,631	52.6
Democratic	Milad Pooran	5,976	47.4

Results by precinct Republicans: 40–50%; 50–60%; 60–70%; 70–80%; Democrats: 50–60%

2022 Maryland's 31st House of Delegates district election
Party	Candidate	Votes	%
Republican	Nic Kipke (incumbent)	28,518	22.24%
Republican	Brian Chisholm (incumbent)	27,570	21.50%
Republican	Rachel Muñoz (incumbent)	26,117	20.37%
Democratic	Kevin Burke	19,953	15.56%
Democratic	Milad Pooran	17,213	13.42%
Libertarian	Travis S. Lerol	8,509	6.64%
Write-in		356	0.28%
Total votes		128,236	100.00%
Republican hold			
Republican hold			
Republican gain from Democratic			

=== District 32 ===
The new 32nd district encompasses part of north Anne Arundel County, including Glen Burnie and Fort Meade. Two-term Democratic incumbent Mark S. Chang and first-term incumbents J. Sandy Bartlett and Mike Rogers, who were elected in 2018 with 20.9, 20.7, and 19.9 percent of the vote respectively, were all running for re-election.

Democratic primary results
Party	Candidate	Votes	%
Democratic	Mark S. Chang (incumbent)	7,117	30.1
Democratic	J. Sandy Bartlett (incumbent)	6,829	28.9
Democratic	Mike Rogers (incumbent)	6,127	25.9
Democratic	Dorcas Olasimibo Ajanlekoko	3,591	15.2

Republican primary results
Party	Candidate	Votes	%
Republican	Michele Speakman	3,242	34.3
Republican	Michael Jette	3,115	33.0
Republican	Monica L. W. Smearman	3,094	32.7

Results by precinct Democrats: 50–60%; 60–70%; 70–80%; 80–90%; >90%; Republicans: 50–60%; 60–70%

2022 Maryland's 32nd House of Delegates district election
Party	Candidate	Votes	%
Democratic	Mark S. Chang (incumbent)	21,755	22.38%
Democratic	J. Sandy Bartlett (incumbent)	20,988	21.59%
Democratic	Mike Rogers (incumbent)	20,597	21.19%
Republican	Monica L. W. Smearman	11,384	11.71%
Republican	Michael Jette	11,213	11.53%
Republican	Michele Speakman	11,169	11.49%
Write-in		107	0.11%
Total votes		97,213	100.00%
Democratic hold			
Democratic hold			
Democratic hold			

=== District 33A ===
Following the 2020 redistricting cycle, District 33 was split into three districts, 33A, 33B, and 33C. The new District 33A encompasses part of Anne Arundel County, including parts of Odenton and Gambrills. Two-term Republican incumbent Sid Saab, who was re-elected in 2018 with 16.5 percent of the vote, announced on April 11, 2022, that he would run for state Senate instead of seeking a third term.

Republican primary results
Party	Candidate	Votes	%
Republican	Kim Mills	1,436	100.0

Democratic primary results
Party	Candidate	Votes	%
Democratic	Andrew C. Pruski	1,959	52.2
Democratic	Marguerite R. Morris	1,338	35.7
Democratic	Michael J. Sopata	455	12.1

Results by precinct Pruski: 50–60%; 60–70%; 70–80%; 80–90%; Mills: 50–60%; 60–70%; >90%

2022 Maryland's 33A House of Delegates district election
Party	Candidate	Votes	%
Democratic	Andrew Pruski	9,772	67.17%
Republican	Kim Mills	4,765	32.75%
Write-in		11	0.08%
Total votes		14,548	100.00%
Democratic gain from Republican			

=== District 33B ===
Following the 2020 redistricting cycle, District 33 was split into three districts, 33A, 33B, and 33C. The new District 33B encompasses part of Anne Arundel County, including Crofton, Davidsonville, and Crownsville. Republican incumbent Rachel Muñoz, who was appointed to the seat on November 8, 2021, was redrawn into the 33rd district, creating an open seat.

Republican primary results
Party	Candidate	Votes	%
Republican	Stuart Michael Schmidt, Jr.	2,498	70.4
Republican	Tyler Bailey	1,050	29.6

Democratic primary results
Party	Candidate	Votes	%
Democratic	John Wakefield	3,681	100.0

Results by precinct Schmidt: 50–60%; Wakefield: 50–60%; 60–70%

2022 Maryland's 33B House of Delegates district election
Party	Candidate	Votes	%
Republican	Stuart Michael Schmidt, Jr.	10,501	50.66%
Democratic	John Wakefield	10,204	49.23%
Write-in		24	0.12%
Total votes		20,729	100.00%
Republican hold			

=== District 33C ===
Following the 2020 redistricting cycle, District 33 was split into three districts, 33A, 33B, and 33C. The new District 33C encompasses part of Anne Arundel County, including Cape Saint Claire and Severna Park. First-term Democratic incumbent Heather Bagnall, who was elected in 2018 with 16.1 percent of the vote, was running for a second term in 2022.

Democratic primary results
Party	Candidate	Votes	%
Democratic	Heather Bagnall (incumbent)	3,836	100.0

Republican primary results
Party	Candidate	Votes	%
Republican	Kerry A. Gillespie	2,952	100.0

Results by precinct Bagnall: 50–60%; Gillespie: 50–60%

2022 Maryland's 33C House of Delegates district election
Party	Candidate	Votes	%
Democratic	Heather Bagnall (incumbent)	10,860	54.06%
Republican	Kerry A. Gillespie	9,210	45.84%
Write-in		20	0.10%
Total votes		20,090	100.00%
Democratic hold			

=== District 34A ===
The new District 34A encompasses south Harford County, including Edgewood, Aberdeen, and Havre de Grace. First-term Democratic incumbent Steven C. Johnson, who was elected in 2018 with 24.9 percent of the vote, was running for a second term, while first-term incumbent Mary Ann Lisanti, who was elected in 2018 with 28.5 of the vote, was running for state Senate in District 34 instead of seeking a third term.

Democratic primary results
Party	Candidate	Votes	%
Democratic	Andre V. Johnson, Jr.	4,619	42.8
Democratic	Steven C. Johnson (incumbent)	3,486	32.3
Democratic	Sarahia Benn	2,682	24.9

Republican primary results
Party	Candidate	Votes	%
Republican	Glen Glass	2,925	37.9
Republican	Teresa Walter	2,442	31.7
Republican	David A. Martin	1,715	22.2
Republican	Shekinah Hollingsworth	629	8.2

Results by precinct Democrats: 50–60%; 60–70%; 70–80%; Republicans: 50–60%; 60–70%

2022 Maryland's 34A House of Delegates district election
Party	Candidate	Votes	%
Democratic	Andre V. Johnson, Jr.	13,478	29.59%
Democratic	Steven C. Johnson (incumbent)	12,029	26.41%
Republican	Glen Glass	10,717	23.53%
Republican	Teresa Walter	9,248	20.31%
Write-in		72	0.16%
Total votes		45,544	100.00%
Democratic hold			
Democratic hold			

=== District 34B ===
The new District 34B encompasses part of Harford County, including Bel Air, Glenwood, and Constant Friendship. Two-term Republican incumbent Susan K. McComas, who was re-elected in 2018 with 65.0 percent of the vote, was running for re-election to a third term.

Republican primary results
Party	Candidate	Votes	%
Republican	Susan K. McComas (incumbent)	2,532	51.4
Republican	Jay M. Ellenby	2,396	48.6

Democratic primary results
Party	Candidate	Votes	%
Democratic	Gillian A. Miller	2,702	100.0

Results by precinct McComas: 50–60%; 60–70%

2022 Maryland's 34B House of Delegates district election
Party	Candidate	Votes	%
Republican	Susan K. McComas (incumbent)	11,094	60.79%
Democratic	Gillian A. Miller	7,111	38.97%
Write-in		44	0.24%
Total votes		18,249	100.00%
Republican hold			

=== District 35A ===
The new District 35A encompasses most of Harford County, including Churchville, Pylesville, and Hickory, and part of Cecil County. Two-term Republican incumbent Teresa E. Reilly, who was re-elected in 2018 with 33.2 percent of the vote, and incumbent Mike Griffith, who was appointed to the seat following the resignation of Andrew Cassilly, were both running for re-election unopposed.

Republican primary results
Party	Candidate	Votes	%
Republican	Teresa E. Reilly (incumbent)	10,443	50.3
Republican	Mike Griffith (incumbent)	10,338	49.8

Results by precinct Republicans: >90%

2022 Maryland's 35A House of Delegates district election
Party	Candidate	Votes	%
Republican	Mike Griffith (incumbent)	25,988	53.26%
Republican	Teresa E. Reilly (incumbent)	21,661	44.39%
Write-in		1,147	2.35%
Total votes		48,796	100.00%
Republican hold			
Republican hold			

=== District 35B ===
The new District 35B encompasses part of Cecil County, including Rising Sun and North East. Two-term Republican incumbent Kevin Hornberger, who was re-elected in 2018 with 63.2 percent of the vote, was running for re-election to a third term.

Primary results by precinct: Hornberger: 40–50%; 40–50%; Streight: 30–40%; 40–50%; 50–60%; Marion: 40–50%

Republican primary results
Party	Candidate	Votes	%
Republican	Kevin Hornberger (incumbent)	1,648	38.6
Republican	Adam Streight	1,532	35.9
Republican	Travis Marion	1,092	25.6

Results by precinct Hornberger: >90%

2022 Maryland's 35B House of Delegates district election
Party	Candidate	Votes	%
Republican	Kevin Hornberger (incumbent)	10,867	95.58%
Write-in		503	4.42%
Total votes		11,370	100.00%
Republican hold			

=== District 36 ===
The new 36th district encompasses all of Kent and Queen Anne's counties, and parts of Cecil and Caroline counties, including Elkton. Two-term Republican incumbent Steven J. Arentz, three-term incumbent Jay Jacobs, and two-term incumbent Jefferson L. Ghrist, who won re-election in 2018 with 22.6, 22.5, and 21.1 percent of the vote respectively, were all running for re-election unopposed.

Republican primary results
Party	Candidate	Votes	%
Republican	Steven J. Arentz (incumbent)	10,304	33.7
Republican	Jay Jacobs (incumbent)	10,251	33.5
Republican	Jefferson L. Ghrist (incumbent)	10,059	32.9

Results by precinct Republicans: >90%

2022 Maryland's 36th House of Delegates district election
Party	Candidate	Votes	%
Republican	Jefferson L. Ghrist (incumbent)	36,249	32.87%
Republican	Jay Jacobs (incumbent)	35,640	32.32%
Republican	Steven J. Arentz (incumbent)	35,541	32.23%
Write-in		2,854	2.59%
Total votes		110,284	100.00%
Republican hold			
Republican hold			
Republican hold			

=== District 37A ===
The new District 37A encompasses parts of Wicomico and Dorchester counties, including Salisbury, Hebron, and Cambridge. Two-term Democratic incumbent Sheree Sample-Hughes, who was re-elected in 2018 with 68.5 percent of the vote, was running for re-election to a third term.

Democratic primary results
Party	Candidate	Votes	%
Democratic	Sheree Sample-Hughes (incumbent)	2,479	100.0

Republican primary results
Party	Candidate	Votes	%
Republican	Donna Bradshaw	1,301	100.0

Results by precinct Sample-Hughes: 50–60%; 60–70%; 70–80%; 80–90%; >90%; Bradshaw: 50–60%; 60–70%; 70–80%; >90%

2022 Maryland's 37A House of Delegates district election
Party	Candidate	Votes	%
Democratic	Sheree Sample-Hughes (incumbent)	5,841	61.93%
Republican	Donna Bradshaw	3,573	37.88%
Write-in		18	0.19%
Total votes		9,432	100.00%
Democratic hold			

=== District 37B ===
The new District 37B encompasses all of Talbot County and parts of Caroline, Dorchester, and Wicomico counties. Two-term Republican incumbent Christopher T. Adams, who was re-elected in 2018 with 33.9 percent of the vote, was running for a third term. Two-term Republican incumbent Johnny Mautz announced on February 16, 2022, that he would run for state Senate instead of seeking a third term.

Republican primary results
Party	Candidate	Votes	%
Republican	Christopher T. Adams (incumbent)	6,472	35.4
Republican	Tom Hutchinson	6,032	33.0
Republican	Nicole L. Acle	4,292	23.5
Republican	Ron James	1,509	8.2

Democratic primary results
Party	Candidate	Votes	%
Democratic	Susan E. Delean-Botkin	6,222	100.0

Results by precinct Republicans: 50–60%; 60–70%; 70–80%; 80–90%; >90%

2022 Maryland's 37B House of Delegates district election
Party	Candidate	Votes	%
Republican	Christopher T. Adams (incumbent)	21,694	37.32%
Republican	Tom Hutchinson	20,876	35.91%
Democratic	Susan E. Delean-Botkin	15,344	26.39%
Write-in		220	0.38%
Total votes		58,134	100.00%
Republican hold			
Republican hold			

=== District 38A ===
The new District 38A encompasses all of Somerset County and parts of Worcester and Wicomico counties, including Berlin, Princess Anne, and Pocomoke City. Three-term Republican incumbent Charles J. Otto, who was re-elected in 2018 with 59.4 percent of the vote, was running for a fourth term in 2022.

Republican primary results
Party	Candidate	Votes	%
Republican	Charles J. Otto (incumbent)	3,774	100.0

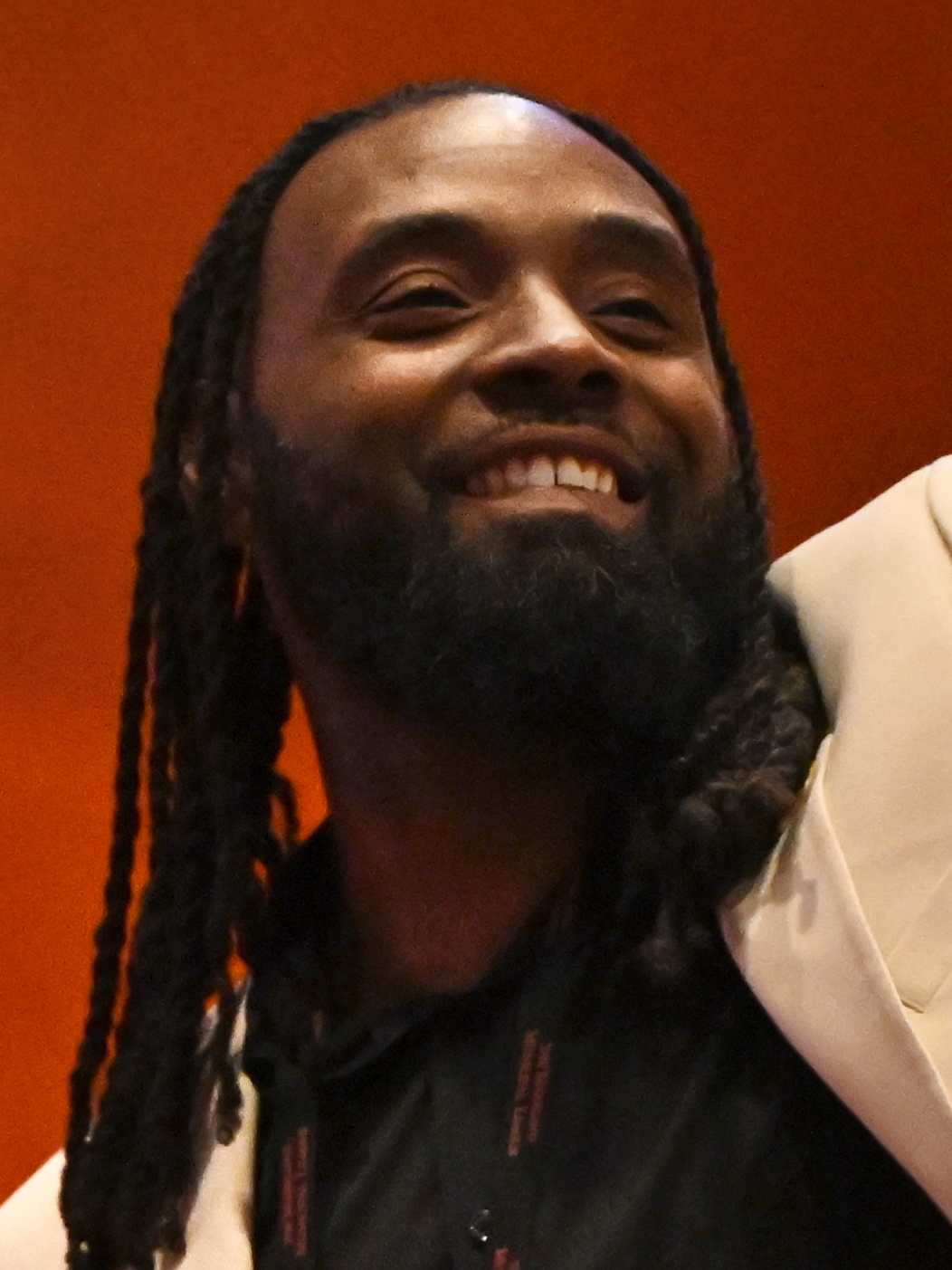
Todd J. Nock (pictured in 2025)

Democratic primary results
Party	Candidate	Votes	%
Democratic	Todd J. Nock	2,006	100.0

Results by precinct Otto: 50–60%; 60–70%; 70–80%; 80–90%; >90%; Nock: 50–60%; 60–70%; 70–80%

2022 Maryland's 38A House of Delegates district election
Party	Candidate	Votes	%
Republican	Charles J. Otto (incumbent)	10,023	63.17%
Democratic	Todd J. Nock	5,828	36.73%
Write-in		15	0.09%
Total votes		15,866	100.00%
Republican hold			

=== District 38B ===
The new District 38B includes the city of Salisbury in Wicomico County. Two-term Republican incumbent Carl Anderton Jr., who was re-elected in 2018 with 94.3 percent of the vote, was running for a third term unopposed.

Republican primary results
Party	Candidate	Votes	%
Republican	Carl Anderton Jr. (incumbent)	2,181	100.0

Results by precinct Anderton: 80–90%; >90%

2022 Maryland's 38B House of Delegates district election
Party	Candidate	Votes	%
Republican	Carl Anderton Jr. (incumbent)	8,026	94.47%
Write-in		470	5.53%
Total votes		8,496	100.00%
Republican hold			

=== District 38C ===
The new District 38C includes east Wicomico County and most of Worcester County, including Pittsville, Ocean City, and Assateague Island. First-term Republican incumbent Wayne A. Hartman, who was elected in 2018 with 95.4 percent of the vote, was running for a second term unopposed.

Republican primary results
Party	Candidate	Votes	%
Republican	Wayne A. Hartman (incumbent)	4,520	100.0

Results by precinct Hartman: >90%

2022 Maryland's 38C House of Delegates district election
Party	Candidate	Votes	%
Republican	Wayne A. Hartman (incumbent)	16,198	97.79%
Write-in		366	2.21%
Total votes		16,564	100.00%
Republican hold			

=== District 39 ===
The new 39th district includes Montgomery Village and parts of Germantown and Clarksburg. First-term Democratic incumbents Gabriel Acevero and Lesley Lopez and three-term incumbent Kirill Reznik, who were elected in 2018 with 31.0, 30.1, and 27.4 percent of the vote respectively, were running for re-election.

Democratic primary results
Party	Candidate	Votes	%
Democratic	Lesley Lopez (incumbent)	7,847	29.3
Democratic	Gabriel Acevero (incumbent)	7,480	27.9
Democratic	Kirill Reznik (incumbent)	6,816	25.4
Democratic	Clint L. Sobratti	4,663	17.4

Results by precinct Democrats: >90%

2022 Maryland's 39th House of Delegates district election
Party	Candidate	Votes	%
Democratic	Gabriel Acevero (incumbent)	23,104	33.04
Democratic	Lesley Lopez (incumbent)	23,282	33.29
Democratic	Kirill Reznik (incumbent)	22,292	31.87
Write-in		1,259	1.80
Total votes		69,937	100.00
Democratic hold			
Democratic hold			
Democratic hold			

=== District 40 ===
The new 40th district encompasses communities in west Baltimore, including Morrell Park, Sandtown-Winchester, and Greenspring. First-term Democratic incumbent Melissa Wells and four-term incumbent Frank M. Conaway Jr., who were elected in 2018 with 29.3 and 25.9 percent of the vote respectively, and incumbent Marlon Amprey, who was appointed to the seat on January 13, 2021, after Nick Mosby was elected to the Baltimore City Council, were running for re-election in 2022.

Democratic primary results
Party	Candidate	Votes	%
Democratic	Melissa Wells (incumbent)	8,059	21.6
Democratic	Marlon Amprey (incumbent)	7,150	19.2
Democratic	Frank M. Conaway Jr. (incumbent)	6,928	18.6
Democratic	Kathy Shulman	4,819	12.9
Democratic	China Boak Terrell	4,299	11.5
Democratic	Crystal Jackson Parker	4,120	11.0
Democratic	Cameron E. Green, Sr.	1,212	3.3
Democratic	Juan Snell	744	2.0

Republican primary results
Party	Candidate	Votes	%
Republican	Zulieka A. Baysmore	400	100.0

Results by precinct Democrats: 70–80%; 80–90%; >90%

2022 Maryland's 40th House of Delegates district election
Party	Candidate	Votes	%
Democratic	Melissa Wells (incumbent)	20,872	32.67%
Democratic	Frank M. Conaway Jr. (incumbent)	20,052	31.39%
Democratic	Marlon Amprey (incumbent)	19,778	30.96%
Republican	Zulieka A. Baysmore	2,852	4.46%
Write-in		328	0.51%
Total votes		63,882	100.00%
Democratic hold			
Democratic hold			
Democratic hold			

=== District 41 ===
The new 41st district encompasses communities in west Baltimore, including Wyndhurst, Yale Heights, and Edmondson. First-term Democratic incumbents Dalya Attar and Tony Bridges and ten-term incumbent Samuel I. Rosenberg, who were elected in 2018 with 31.3, 30.9, and 31.0 percent of the vote respectively, were running for re-election.

Democratic primary results
Party	Candidate	Votes	%
Democratic	Dalya Attar (incumbent)	12,871	25.6
Democratic	Tony Bridges (incumbent)	12,523	24.9
Democratic	Samuel I. Rosenberg (incumbent)	12,261	24.4
Democratic	Bilal Ali	7,104	14.1
Democratic	Chris Ervin	5,541	11.0

Republican primary results
Party	Candidate	Votes	%
Republican	Scott Graham	687	100.0

Results by precinct Democrats: 80–90%; >90%

2022 Maryland's 41st House of Delegates district election
Party	Candidate	Votes	%
Democratic	Dalya Attar (incumbent)	26,438	32.52%
Democratic	Samuel I. Rosenberg (incumbent)	25,557	31.44%
Democratic	Tony Bridges (incumbent)	24,782	30.49%
Republican	Scott Graham	4,240	5.22%
Write-in		272	0.33%
Total votes		81,289	100.00%
Democratic hold			
Democratic hold			
Democratic hold			

=== District 42A ===
The new District 42A encompasses north Baltimore County, including Glencoe, Hereford, and Phoenix. District 42B incumbent Nino Mangione, who was elected in 2018 with 28.6 percent of the vote, was drawn into the new District 42A, where he was running for a second term.

Republican primary results
Party	Candidate	Votes	%
Republican	Nino Mangione (incumbent)	3,590	100.0

Democratic primary results
Party	Candidate	Votes	%
Democratic	Paul V. Konka	3,154	100.0

Results by precinct Mangione: 50–60%; 60–70%; Konka: 50–60%; 60–70%

2022 Maryland's 42A House of Delegates district election
Party	Candidate	Votes	%
Republican	Nino Mangione (incumbent)	12,009	58.56%
Democratic	Paul V. Konka	8,475	41.33%
Write-in		22	0.11%
Total votes		20,506	100.00%
Republican hold			

=== District 42B ===
The new District 42B includes communities in central Baltimore County, including Timonium, Hampton, and Phoenix. First-term Democratic incumbent Michele Guyton, who was elected in 2018 with 26.5 percent of the vote, was running for a second term.

Democratic primary results
Party	Candidate	Votes	%
Democratic	Michele Guyton (incumbent)	3,701	100.0

Republican primary results
Party	Candidate	Votes	%
Republican	Todd Huff	1,052	51.7
Republican	Jay Walton	982	48.3

Results by precinct Guyton: 50–60%; 60–70%; 70–80%

2022 Maryland's 42B House of Delegates district election
Party	Candidate	Votes	%
Democratic	Michele Guyton (incumbent)	8,904	61.25%
Republican	Todd Huff	5,614	38.62%
Write-in		19	0.13%
Total votes		14,537	100.00%
Democratic hold			

=== District 42C ===
The new District 42C encompasses east Carroll County, including Hampstead, Finksburg, and Mexico.

Republican primary results
Party	Candidate	Votes	%
Republican	Joshua J. Stonko	3,612	68.4
Republican	Lyn Mallick	1,667	31.6

Results by precinct Stonko: >90%

2022 Maryland's 42C House of Delegates district election
Party	Candidate	Votes	%
Republican	Joshua Stonko	14,242	97.61%
Write-in		349	2.39%
Total votes		14,591	100.00%
Republican gain from Democratic			

=== District 43A ===
Following the 2020 redistricting cycle, District 43 was split into two districts, 43A and 43B. The new District 43A encompasses neighborhoods in north Baltimore, including Glen Oaks, Charles Village, and Northwood. First-term Democratic incumbent Regina T. Boyce, who was elected in 2018 with 32.0 percent of the vote, was running for re-election to a second term. Fifth-term incumbents Maggie McIntosh and Curt Anderson, who were re-elected in 2018 with 31.8 and 27.2 percent of the vote respectively, announced that they would not seek re-election to a sixth term in 2022.

Democratic primary results
Party	Candidate	Votes	%
Democratic	Regina T. Boyce (incumbent)	8,090	30.9
Democratic	Elizabeth Embry	7,618	29.1
Democratic	Logan Endow	6,472	24.7
Democratic	Reginald Benbow	2,176	8.3
Democratic	Sherricka Alayshia McGrier-Douglas	1,005	3.8
Democratic	Rikki Vaughn	846	3.2

Republican primary results
Party	Candidate	Votes	%
Republican	Gwendolyn O. Butler	278	100.0

Results by precinct Democrats: 80–90%; >90%

2022 Maryland's 43A House of Delegates district election
Party	Candidate	Votes	%
Democratic	Regina T. Boyce (incumbent)	19,788	47.52%
Democratic	Elizabeth Embry	18,569	44.59%
Green	Renaud Deaundre Brown	1,691	4.06%
Republican	Gwendolyn O. Butler	1,509	3.62%
Write-in		86	0.21%
Total votes		41,643	100.00%
Democratic hold			
Democratic hold			

=== District 43B ===
Following the 2020 redistricting cycle, District 43 was split into two districts, 43A and 43B. The new District 43B encompasses the city of Towson in central Baltimore County. District 42A incumbent Cathi Forbes, who was appointed to the seat on October 29, 2019, following the resignation of Stephen W. Lafferty, was drawn into the new District 43B, where she was running for her first full term.

Democratic primary results
Party	Candidate	Votes	%
Democratic	Cathi Forbes (incumbent)	4,820	91.2
Democratic	Bill Brooks	468	8.9

Results by precinct Forbes: >90%

2022 Maryland's 43B House of Delegates district election
Party	Candidate	Votes	%
Democratic	Cathi Forbes (incumbent)	10,971	97.96%
Write-in		229	2.04%
Total votes		11,200	100.00%
Democratic hold			

=== District 44A ===
The new District 44A encompasses part of Baltimore County, including Baltimore Highlands and Catonsville. Democratic incumbent Roxane L. Prettyman, who was appointed to the seat on August 23, 2021, following the resignation of Keith E. Haynes, did not file to run for re-election to a full term. 12th District incumbent Eric Ebersole was drawn into the new District 44A, where he was running for re-election to a third term.

Democratic primary results
Party	Candidate	Votes	%
Democratic	Eric Ebersole (incumbent)	2,993	100.0

Republican primary results
Party	Candidate	Votes	%
Republican	Joseph D. "Joe" Hooe	824	68.2
Republican	Brian J. Noon	385	31.8

Results by precinct Ebersole: 50–60%; 60–70%; 70–80%; Hooe: 50–60%; 60–70%

2022 Maryland's 44A House of Delegates district election
Party	Candidate	Votes	%
Democratic	Eric Ebersole (incumbent)	6,727	62.42%
Republican	Joseph D. "Joe" Hooe	4,041	37.50%
Write-in		9	0.08%
Total votes		10,777	100.00%
Democratic hold			

=== District 44B ===
The new District 44B includes neighborhoods in southwest Baltimore County, including Woodlawn, Arbutus, and Catonsville. Democratic incumbent Sheila Ruth, who was appointed to the seat on January 31, 2020, after Charles E. Sydnor III was appointed to the Maryland Senate, was running for re-election while two-term incumbent Pat Young announced on May 10, 2021, that he would not seek re-election to a third term, instead running for the Baltimore County Council in District 1 in 2022.

Democratic primary results
Party	Candidate	Votes	%
Democratic	Sheila Ruth (incumbent)	5,774	25.8
Democratic	Aletheia McCaskill	5,132	23.0
Democratic	Aisha Khan	4,714	21.1
Democratic	Bishop Barry Chapman	3,660	16.4
Democratic	Patrick Cusack	1,644	7.4
Democratic	Shazia Shah	1,420	6.4

Results by precinct Democrats: >90%

2022 Maryland's 44B House of Delegates district election
Party	Candidate	Votes	%
Democratic	Sheila Ruth (incumbent)	19,682	51.21%
Democratic	Aletheia McCaskill	18,219	47.40%
Write-in		532	1.38%
Total votes		38,433	100.00%
Democratic hold			
Democratic hold			

=== District 45 ===
The new 45th district encompasses neighborhoods in central and east Baltimore, including Broadway East, Frankford, and Armistead Gardens. First-term Democratic incumbent Stephanie M. Smith, who was elected in 2018 with 27.3 percent of the vote, and incumbent Chanel Branch, who was appointed to the seat on January 28, 2020, after the resignation of Cheryl Glenn, were running for re-election. Seven-term incumbent Talmadge Branch, who was re-elected in 2018 with 26.2 percent of the vote, announced on April 15, 2022, that he would not seek re-election to an eighth term in 2022.

Democratic primary results
Party	Candidate	Votes	%
Democratic	Jackie Addison	9,577	25.3
Democratic	Stephanie M. Smith (incumbent)	8,638	22.9
Democratic	Caylin Young	8,567	22.7
Democratic	Chanel Branch (incumbent)	8,451	22.4
Democratic	George Johnson	2,567	6.8

Republican primary results
Party	Candidate	Votes	%
Republican	Antonio Barboza	611	100.0

Results by precinct Democrats: 60–70%; 70–80%; 80–90%; >90%

2022 Maryland's 45th House of Delegates district election
Party	Candidate	Votes	%
Democratic	Stephanie M. Smith (incumbent)	21,161	32.13%
Democratic	Jackie Addison	20,912	31.75%
Democratic	Caylin Young	19,963	30.31%
Republican	Antonio Barboza	3,582	5.44%
Write-in		246	0.37%
Total votes		65,864	100.00%
Democratic hold			
Democratic hold			
Democratic hold			

=== District 46 ===
The new 46th district encompasses neighborhoods in central and south Baltimore, including the Inner Harbor, Bayview, and Curtis Bay. Three-term Democratic incumbent Luke Clippinger and first-term incumbent Robbyn Lewis, who were re-elected in 2018 with 27.8 and 27.3 percent of the vote respectively, were running for re-election. Two-term incumbent Brooke Lierman, who received 28.6 percent of the vote in 2018, announced on December 17, 2020, that she would run for Comptroller rather than seek a third term in 2022.

Republicans J. Brian Voss and Mekkah X. Mohammed ran unopposed in the primary, but were disqualified from running in the general election.

Democratic primary results
Party	Candidate	Votes	%
Democratic	Robbyn Lewis (incumbent)	8,449	24.5
Democratic	Luke Clippinger (incumbent)	7,560	22.0
Democratic	Mark Edelson	6,550	19.0
Democratic	Vince Andrews	5,692	16.5
Democratic	Sean D. Burns	3,220	9.4
Democratic	Augusta Yeager Christensen	2,954	8.6

Republican primary results
Party	Candidate	Votes	%
Republican	J. Brian Voss	771	35.3
Republican	Pete Waters	769	35.2
Republican	Mekkah X. Mohammed	643	29.5

Results by precinct Democrats: 70–80%; 80–90%; >90%

2022 Maryland's 46th House of Delegates district election
Party	Candidate	Votes	%
Democratic	Robbyn Lewis (incumbent)	22,274	30.81%
Democratic	Luke Clippinger (incumbent)	22,162	30.65%
Democratic	Mark Edelson	22,103	30.57%
Republican	Pete Waters	5,492	7.60%
Write-in		265	0.37%
Total votes		72,296	100.00%
Democratic hold			
Democratic hold			
Democratic hold			

=== District 47A ===
The new District 47A includes several Prince George's County communities, including Landover, Chillum, and Mount Rainier. First-term Democratic incumbent Julian Ivey and two-term incumbent Diana M. Fennell, who were elected in 2018 with 52.2 and 46.4 percent of the vote respectively, were running for a second term unopposed.

Democratic primary results
Party	Candidate	Votes	%
Democratic	Diana M. Fennell (incumbent)	6,201	50.1
Democratic	Julian Ivey (incumbent)	6,187	49.9

Results by precinct Democrats: >90%

2022 Maryland's 47A House of Delegates district election
Party	Candidate	Votes	%
Democratic	Julian Ivey (incumbent)	11,018	50.40
Democratic	Diana M. Fennell (incumbent)	10,621	48.58
Write-in		223	1.02
Total votes		21,862	100.00
Democratic hold			
Democratic hold			

=== District 47B ===
The new District 47B includes several Prince George's County communities, including Langley Park, University Park, and Adelphi. First-term Democratic incumbent Wanika B. Fisher, who was elected in 2018 with 99.1 percent of the vote, announced on June 9, 2021, that she would run for the Prince George's County Council in District 2 rather than seek a second term in 2022.

Democratic primary results
Party	Candidate	Votes	%
Democratic	Deni Taveras	1,012	52.6
Democratic	Marlin Jenkins	872	45.3
Democratic	Jorge Sactic	41	2.1

Results by precinct Taveras: >90%

2022 Maryland's 47B House of Delegates district election
Party	Candidate	Votes	%
Democratic	Deni Taveras	3,259	98.10
Write-in		63	1.90
Total votes		3,322	100.00
Democratic hold			

== See also ==
- 2022 Maryland gubernatorial election
- 2022 Maryland Comptroller election
- 2022 Maryland Attorney General election
- 2022 Maryland Senate election
- List of Maryland General Assemblies
