= Glenwood, Maryland =

Glenwood, Maryland may refer to:

- Glenwood, Harford County, Maryland, an unincorporated community in Harford County
- Glenwood, Howard County, Maryland, an unincorporated community in Howard County
