= Tiffany T. Alston =

American politician (born 1977)

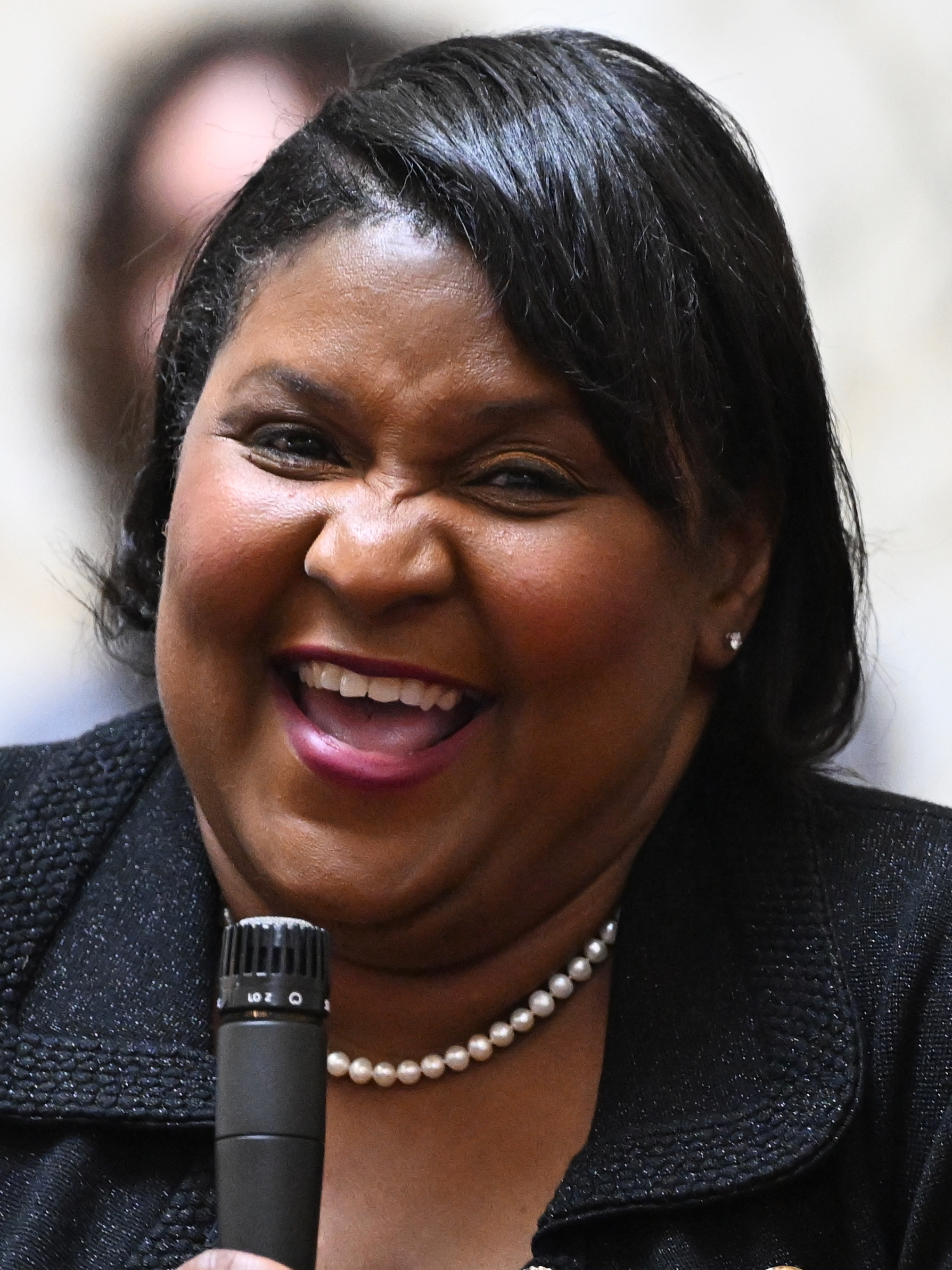
- Alston in 2026

Member-elect of the Maryland Senate from the 24th district
- Assuming office January 13, 2027
- Succeeding: Joanne C. Benson

Member of the Maryland House of Delegates from the 24th district
- Incumbent
- Assumed office January 11, 2023
- Preceded by: Faye Martin Howell
- In office January 12, 2011 – October 9, 2012
- Preceded by: Joanne C. Benson
- Succeeded by: Darren Swain

Personal details
- Born: Tiffany T. Alston; April 22, 1977 (age 49) Washington, D.C., U.S.
- Party: Democratic
- Spouse: Kendal Gray
- Children: 1
- Education: University of Maryland, College Park (BA); University of the District of Columbia (JD)
- Occupation: Lawyer

Tiffany T. Alston (born April 22, 1977) is an American politician who is a member-elect of the Maryland Senate from District 24. A member of the Democratic Party, she represented District 24 in the Maryland House of Delegates from 2011 to 2012 and since 2023.

Alston was born in Washington, D.C., and raised in Prince George's County, Maryland. She graduated from the University of Maryland, College Park and the David A. Clarke School of Law, afterwards practicing law with her own law firm from 2004 to 2012. She also worked as a volunteer teacher with AmeriCorps from 1999 to 2001, and as a chief of staff within the Maryland Department of Public Safety and Correctional Services's corrections division from 2004 to 2005.

Alston was elected to the Maryland House of Delegates in 2010, but was suspended from office in October 2012 after being found guilty of stealing Maryland General Assembly funds to pay an employee at her law firm. She was reelected to the House of Delegates in 2022, serving one term before winning election to the Maryland Senate.

== Background ==
Alston was born in Washington, D.C., and grew up in Prince George's County, Maryland. She attended Seat Pleasant Elementary School. She graduated from the University of Maryland, College Park with a Bachelor of Arts in criminology & criminal justice and from David A. Clarke School of Law with a Juris Doctor in 2002.

From 1999 to 2001, she was a volunteer teacher with the AmeriCorps National Service Corporation. From 2004 to 2005, she served as a Chief of Staff within the Division of Correction at the Maryland Department of Public Safety & Correctional Services. She is a former mentor of the I Have a Dream Foundation, and a member of Sigma Gamma Rho sorority.

From 2004 to 2012, she practiced law with her own law firm, which was located in Upper Marlboro, Maryland. Alston's law license was suspended by the Maryland Court of Appeals on September 25, 2012, and she was disbarred on May 3, 2013.

== In the legislature ==
Alston was a member of the House of Delegates from 2011 to 2013 and served on the Judiciary committee. She was a member of the Prince George's County Delegation, the Women's Caucus, and the Legislative Black Caucus of Maryland.

In 2022, Alston filed to run for the Maryland House of Delegates in District 24, seeking to succeed state delegate Jazz Lewis, who was running for Congress in Maryland's 4th congressional district. She won election to the seat and was sworn in on January 11, 2023, and has since served in the Health and Government Operations Committee.

In January 2024, former Baltimore State's Attorney Marilyn Mosby hired Alston to represent her in her disbarment case.

In 2024, Alston applied to run as a delegate to the Democratic National Convention pledged to Joe Biden, but was denied by the Maryland Democratic Party.

In 2026, Alston ran for the Maryland Senate, seeking to succeed state senator Joanne C. Benson. She won the Democratic primary election on June 23, 2026, defeating businessman Kevin Ford Jr., and ran in the general election unopposed. She was assigned to the Senate Education, Energy, and the Environment Committee at the start of the 2027 legislative session.

=== Marriage equality ===
During the 2011 legislative session, Alston was a co-sponsor of "Religious Freedom and Civil Marriage Protection Act". A similar bill was filed in the Maryland Senate (SB 116 - Civil Marriage Protection Act) and was assigned to the House Judiciary Committee, the committee on which Alston served. During the committee voting session on SB 116, Alston revoked her co-sponsorship and instead offered an amendment to change the bill from same-sex marriage to civil unions. The amendment failed, and Alston then voted against the bill. Despite Alston's vote, SB 116 was approved by the committee 12-10 and was forwarded to the full House of Delegates for final approval, but the bill was eventually sent back to committee, effectively terminating the bill for the session.

Alston voted against the Civil Marriage Protection Act in committee when it was re-introduced in the 2012 legislative session, but voted for the bill after it was amended to block the bill from going into effect if efforts to bring it to a referendum were being litigated.

== Criminal charges ==
Alston was indicted in an Anne Arundel County courtroom with embezzlement on September 24, 2011 on one count each of felony and misdemeanor theft, misappropriation by a fiduciary and two election law offenses for allegedly using Maryland General Assembly funds and her election campaign funds to cover her wedding expenses and to pay an employee of her law firm.

Alston was found guilty of misdemeanor theft of General Assembly funds and misconduct in office on June 12, 2012. The judge postponed sentencing until after a separate trial, scheduled for October 2012, on the charges regarding Alston's use of her 2010 campaign funds to pay her wedding-related expenses. On October 9, 2012, the judge struck the jury verdict and entered probation before judgement after Alston entered a plea deal agreed to pay $800 in restitution to the General Assembly and complete 300 hours of community service. On October 10, 2012, General Assembly Counsel Daniel A. Friedman announced that Alston was suspended from her office without pay or benefits due to a Maryland constitutional provision. Alston sued to try to get her legislative job back, but the Maryland Court of Appeals ruled against her on January 4, 2013.

== Post-legislative career ==
In February 2014, Alston filed to run for the Maryland House of Delegates in District 24, seeking to gain her old seat back from Darren Swain. In order to run for this seat, Alston had to pay the Maryland State Board of Elections back for the $750 in late fees that she owed for failing to file timely campaign finance reports. She came in fourth place in the Democratic primary, receiving 13.0 percent of the vote.

In 2017, Alston filed to run for Maryland Senate, seeking to challenge two-term incumbent Joanne C. Benson. She received 31.5 percent of the vote in the Democratic primary election.

== Electoral history ==
Maryland House of Delegates District 24 Democratic Primary Election, 2010
Party	Candidate	Votes	%
Democratic	Carolyn J. B. Howard	6,962	24.9
Democratic	Michael L. Vaughn	5,750	20.5
Democratic	Tiffany Alston	3,434	12.3
Democratic	Greg Hall	3,124	11.2
Democratic	Kenneth Williams	1,707	6.1
Democratic	Byron Richardson	1,673	6.0
Democratic	Clayton Anthony Aarons	1,594	5.7
Democratic	Michael Oputa	1,530	5.5
Democratic	Nancy L. Dixon-Saxon	1,393	5.0
Democratic	Sherry James-Strother	839	3.0

Maryland House of Delegates District 24 Election, 2010
Party	Candidate	Votes	%
Democratic	Tiffany Alston	22,970	34.3
Democratic	Carolyn J. B. Howard	22,083	33.0
Democratic	Michael L. Vaughn	21,832	32.6
Write-in		103	0.2

Maryland House of Delegates District 24 Democratic Primary Election, 2014
Party	Candidate	Votes	%
Democratic	Carolyn J. B. Howard	7,864	22.0
Democratic	Michael L. Vaughn	6,880	19.3
Democratic	Erek Barron	4,849	13.6
Democratic	Tiffany Alston	4,628	13.0
Democratic	Marva Jo Camp	3,691	10.3
Democratic	Greg Hall	3,031	8.5
Democratic	Darren Swain	2,520	7.1
Democratic	Phillip A. Raines	1,100	3.1
Democratic	Delaneo L. Miller	683	1.9
Democratic	Durand Adrian Ford	423	1.2

Maryland Senate District 24 Democratic Primary Election, 2018
Party	Candidate	Votes	%
Democratic	Joanne C. Benson	10,230	52.3
Democratic	Tiffany Alston	6,160	31.5
Democratic	Everett D. Browning, Sr.	3,179	16.2
