= Darren Swain =

American politician

Darren M. Swain

Member of the Maryland House of Delegates from the 24th district
- In office January 13, 1999 – January 8, 2003
- In office January 28, 2013 – January 14, 2015
- Preceded by: Tiffany Alston
- Succeeded by: Erek Barron

Personal details
- Born: May 6, 1970 (age 56) Windsor, North Carolina
- Party: Democratic
- Children: 1
- Profession: administrator

Darren M. Swain is an American politician, a Democrat and a former member of the Maryland House of Delegates.

== Background ==
Swain was born in Windsor North Carolina, the son of Dorothy Swain. Ms. Swain got a job with the Federal Judiciary and moved her family to the Washington suburbs. Swain then attended the Prince George's County schools, graduating from Parkdale High School, in Riverdale (now renamed Riverdale Park), Maryland in 1988. He then attended Bowie State University where he earned a bachelor's and a master's degree.

== In the legislature ==
After the removal of Delegate Tiffany Alston, Governor O'Malley appointed Swain to fill the vacancy.
