= Danville, Prince George's County, Maryland =

Unincorporated community in Maryland, United States

Danville
- Unincorporated community
- Location within the state of Maryland Danville (the United States)
- Coordinates: 38°41′07″N 76°55′18″W
- Country: United States of America
- State: Maryland
- County: Prince George's
- Time zone: UTC-5 (Eastern (EST))
  - Summer (DST): UTC-4 (EDT)
- GNIS feature ID: 597310

Danville is an unincorporated community in Prince George's County, Maryland, United States. It is located within the Brandywine mailing address, and consists of only farms, with no businesses, and a very small housing development which began in 2009.
