= Maryland House of Delegates District 11B =

American Legislative District

Maryland's legislative district 11B
- Represents part of Baltimore County
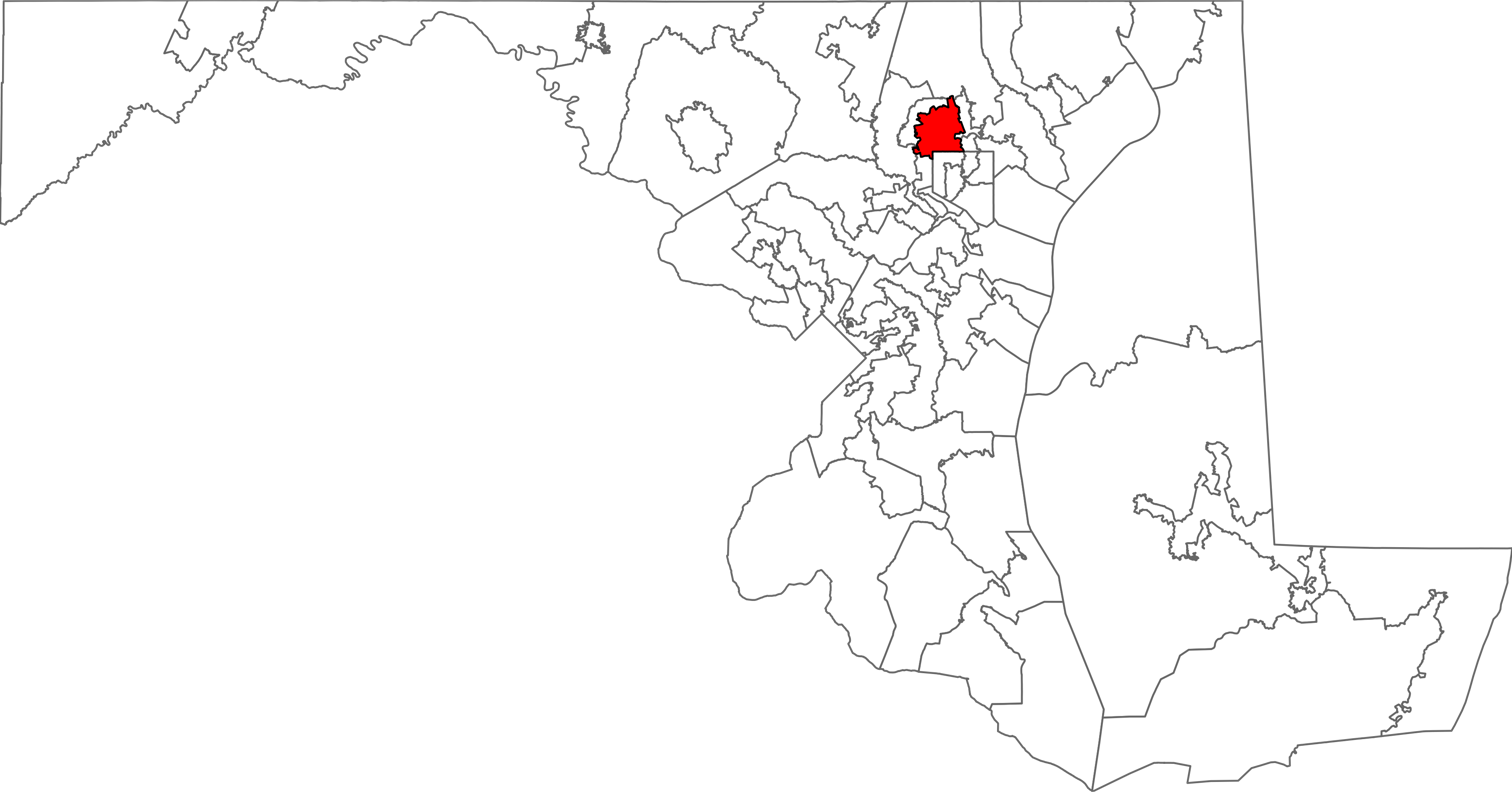
- Senator: Shelly L. Hettleman
- Delegate(s): Dana M. Stein and Jon M. Cardin
- Demographics: 68.31% White; 16.34% Black/African American; 0.10% Native American; 6.79% Asian; 0.03% Hawaiian/Pacific Islander; 0.55% Other race; 3.34% Two or more races; 4.55% Hispanic
- Population: 84,119
- Voting-age population: 66,050
- Registered voters: 63,091

District 11B of the Maryland House of Delegates is one of the 71 districts composing the Maryland House of Delegates. It, along with District 11A composes the 11th Maryland Legislative District. It covers part of central Baltimore County, including much of Cockeysville and Pikesville, and all of Mays Chapel, Stevenson, and Lutherville-Timonium. It is represented by two delegates.

== Demographics ==
As of the 2020 United States Census, district 11B has a total population of 84,119, of whom 57,459 (68.31%) are White, 13,744 (16.34%) are Black, 82 (0.10%) are Indigenous American or Native Alaskan, 5,710 (6.79%) are Asian, 24 (0.03%) are Native Hawaiian or Pacific Islander, 3,828 (4.55%) are Hispanic of any race, 465 (0.55%) are from some other race, and 2,807 (3.34%) are from two or more races.

As of the 2024 United States presidential election, district 11B had 66,050 voting age people and 63,091 registered voters (75.00% of the total population, 95.55% of the voting age population) of whom 34,870 (55.27%) were registered with the Democratic Party, 15,191 (24.08%) with the Republican Party, 71 (0.001%) with the Green Party, 55 (0.001%) with the No Labels Maryland Party, 251 (0.004%) with the Libertarian Party, 549 (0.009%) with another party, and 12,104 (19.18%) were registered as unaffiliated.

== Political representation ==
District 11B is currently represented in the Maryland State Senate by Shelly L. Hettleman (D), and in the House of Delegates by Jon S. Cardin (D) and Dana M. Stein (D).

The district is represented by Lela Cambell, Noel Levy, Reece Peak, and Hannah Swird on the Democratic Central Committee, as well as Patti Fallon as Chair of the Baltimore County Republican Central Committee.

== Election history ==
Prior to 2022, district 11B did not exist as separate from district 11A. As with the rest of the districts for the Maryland House of Delegates, elections are held every four years during the United States Midterm Elections.

=== 2022 ===
Name	Party	Votes	Percentage	Result
Jim Simpson	Republican	10,640	16.77%	Lost
Tyler A. Stiff	Republican	9,072	14.30%	Lost
Jon S. Cardin	Democratic	22,115	34.86%	Won
Dana M. Stein	Democratic	21,536	33.95%	Won
Write Ins (other)		70	0.11%	All Lost

=== 2026 ===
In 2026, incumbents Jon Cardin and Dana Stein won re-election, defeating the single Republican, John Gordon.

Three of the four incumbents, Lela Cambell, Noel Levy, Reece Peak, as well as challengers Austin Brown, Prudence Henderson, and Alyssa Paradise ran for election to the Democratic Central Committee, with Cambell, Brown, Levy, and Paradise winning. Hannah Swird did not run for re-election.

==== Results ====
Party	Candidate	Votes	Percentage	Result
Democratic	Jon Cardin (incumbent)	24,250	42.62 %	Won
Democratic	Dana Stein (incumbent)	22,147	38.93%	Won
Republican	John Gordon	10,322	18.14%	Lost
Write-in		173	0.30%	All Lost
Total votes		56,892	100%	
