= Faye Martin Howell =

American politician (born 1953)

Member of the Maryland House of Delegates from the 24th district
- In office November 12, 2021 – January 11, 2023
- Preceded by: Erek Barron
- Succeeded by: Tiffany T. Alston

Personal details
- Born: January 22, 1953 (age 73)
- Party: Democratic

Faye Martin Howell (born January 22, 1953) is a Democratic politician from Maryland. Following the resignation of State Delegate Erek Barron to serve as the United States Attorney for the District of Maryland, Governor Larry Hogan appointed her to serve the remainder of his term. She served from November 12, 2021 to January 11, 2023 in the Maryland House of Delegates, representing district 24, based in Prince George's County. She previously worked as an information technology specialist at the U.S. Environmental Protection Agency until her retirement in 2009, and as the treasurer of the Prince George's County Democratic Central Committee.
