= Roxane L. Prettyman =

American politician (born 1957)

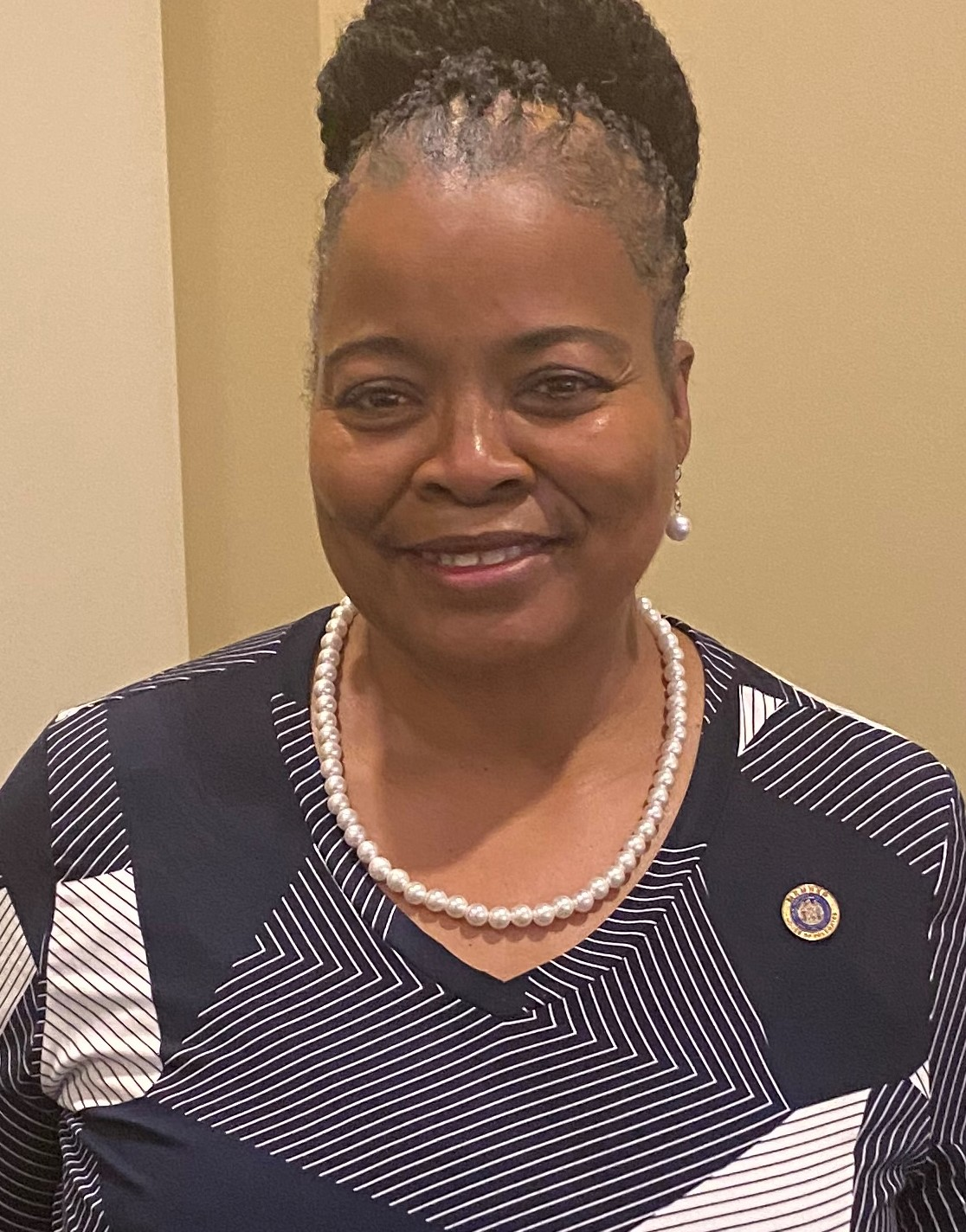

Member of the Maryland House of Delegates from the 44A district
- In office August 23, 2021 – January 11, 2023
- Preceded by: Keith E. Haynes
- Succeeded by: Eric Ebersole (redistricting)

Personal details
- Born: March 15, 1957 (age 69) Baltimore, Maryland, U.S.
- Party: Democratic

Roxane Lee Prettyman (born March 15, 1957) is a Democratic politician from Maryland. From 2021 to 2023, she served in the Maryland House of Delegates, representing district 44A, based in Baltimore.

== Early life ==
Prettyman was born in the Sandtown-Winchester neighborhood of Baltimore. Prior to holding office, she was a paralegal specialist for the Social Security Administration for 39 years before retiring in 2018. She currently serves as the community outreach and engagement director of First Mount Calvary Baptist Church and on other community boards. She has been an active member of the Baltimore City Democratic State Central Committee since 2015.

== In the legislature ==
Prettyman was appointed to the Maryland House of Delegates on August 23, 2021 to fill the vacancy when Keith Haynes resigned from the legislature. She has been assigned to the Environment and Transportation Committee and its Environment Subcommittee. She is also a member of the Local Government and Bi-County Agencies Subcommittee of the Environment and Transportation Committee. She is a member of the Legislative Black Caucus of Maryland.
