= Cathi Forbes =

American politician (born 1965)

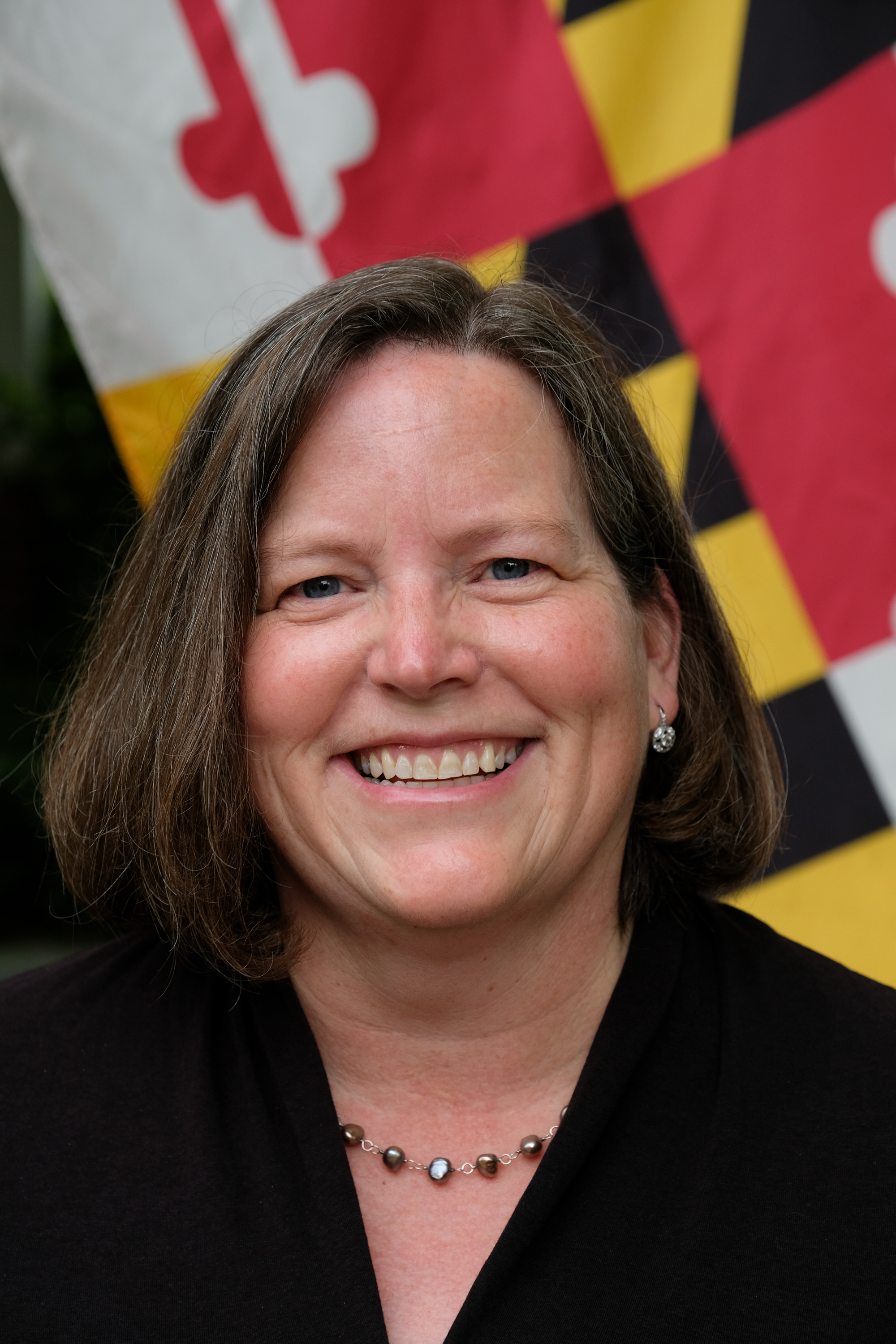

Member of the Maryland House of Delegates from the 43B district
- Incumbent
- Assumed office October 29, 2019
- Appointed by: Larry Hogan
- Preceded by: Stephen W. Lafferty

Personal details
- Born: June 15, 1965 (age 61) Cleveland, Ohio, U.S.
- Party: Democratic
- Spouse: John Patterson
- Children: 2

Cathi Forbes (born June 15, 1965) is an American politician of the Democratic Party who represents District 43B in the Maryland House of Delegates. Governor Larry Hogan first appointed her to succeed former state delegate Stephen Lafferty in 2019, in what was then District 42A. She was then elected to a four-year term in 2022, representing District 43B, which was drawn based on the 2020 Census.

== Early life and career ==
Forbes was born on June 15, 1965, in Cleveland, Ohio. She graduated from Charles F. Brush High School in Lyndhurst, Ohio and attended Allegheny College in Meadville, Pennsylvania, where she earned a B.A. degree in English language and art history in 1987. She worked in Washington, D.C. as an editorial assistant at a magazine and as administrative assistant with an advertising agency, where she met her husband, John Patterson.

In 1990, Forbes and Patterson moved to Baltimore, where she worked for Barton Cotton, a company that makes greeting cards. They moved to Towson in 2000.

In 2000, Forbes established the Coalition for Open Government to oppose a $75 million expansion of the Baltimore County Detention Center, the county's main jail center. She argued that county officials had decided to expand the jail without seeking public input. In addition, she pointed to a 1995 study that called for building a new jail on a much larger 40- to 50-acre plot to accommodate expansion.

In December 2007, Forbes and a few others formed Towson Families United, seeking to pressure school and county officials to either build a new school in Towson or reopen one of the three that closed in the late 1970s, a plan that was opposed by county executive James T. Smith Jr. In May 2008, the school board voted to build a new school on the campus of the Ridge Ruxton School.

In 2014, Forbes became a mediation coordinator for the Baltimore County Orphans' Court.

In September 2019, following the resignation of state delegate Stephen Lafferty, Forbes applied to fill his vacancy in the Maryland House of Delegates. The Baltimore County Democratic State Central Committee voted to recommend appointing Forbes to fill the vacancy on September 25, and Governor Larry Hogan appointed her to the House of Delegates on October 9, 2019.

== In the legislature ==
Forbes was sworn into the Maryland House of Delegates on October 29, 2019.

=== Committee assignments ===
- Member, Appropriations Committee, 2020–present
- Chair, Oversight Committee on Pensions, 2023–present
- Member, Capital Budget subcommittee, 2023–present
- Education & Economic Development subcommittee, 2020–present
- Member, Oversight Committee on Personnel, 2020–2022

=== Other memberships ===
- Member, Maryland Legislative Transit Caucus, 2019–present
- Member, Women Legislators of Maryland, 2019–present
- Member, Maryland Legislative Latino Caucus, 2021–present
- Honorary Lifetime Membership Award, Maryland PTA, 2012–present
- Member, Board of Directors, Children's Playhouse of Maryland, 2015–present
- Member, League of Women Voters
- Member, Sierra Club

== Political positions and legislation ==
=== Education ===
Forbes supports the Blueprint for Maryland's Future, a recommendation from the Kirwan Commission. She also supported legislation introduced in the 2020 legislative session that would provide $2.2 billion for local school construction.

Forbes has been a vocal advocate in favor of replacing Towson High School, the oldest and most overcrowded high school in the county. Two new high schools ware included in the 2022 budget.

=== Environment ===
Forbes introduced legislation in the 2020 legislative session that would require all state-owned buildings to install solar panels on their roofs. The bill did not receive a vote during the session. In January 2022, Forbes introduced legislation, HB1165, to require new state-funded construction or renovation projects—including new schools—to be high-performance “green” buildings.

=== Social Issues ===
After hearing about racist and anti-Semitic language that continues to exist on older property deeds, in the form of covenants, Forbes introduced HB1077 in 2020. It made such language easier to remove by homeowners, by waiving any fees associated with the removal. Her bill passed unanimously into law in 2020, and received national media attention.

=== Housing ===
In September 2020, Forbes resisted a planned 57-unit affordable housing complex, due to the possible loss of a historic Black neighborhood that was currently there.

=== Labor rights ===
Forbes introduced legislation in the 2021 legislative session that gave Baltimore County Public Library staff the right to form a union and receive collective bargaining rights. The bill passed and went into effect without Governor Hogan's signature. The employees voted in March 2022 to form a union.
