= Greenspring, Baltimore =

- neighborhood statistical area
- Location within Baltimore
- Coordinates: 39.33673°N 76.66384°W
- Country: United States
- State: Maryland
- City: Baltimore

Area
  - Total: 0.226 sq mi (0.59 km^{2})
  - Land: 0.226 sq mi (0.59 km^{2})

Population (2009)
  - Total: 4,030
  - Density: 17,800/sq mi (6,880/km^{2})
- Time zone: UTC-5 (Eastern)
  - Summer (DST): UTC-4 (EDT)
- ZIP code: 21215, 21209
- Area code: 410, 443, and 667

Greenspring is a neighborhood in the North District of Baltimore, located between the neighborhoods of Woodberry (east) and Central Park Heights (west). Its boundaries are marked by West Cold Spring Lane (north), Greenspring Avenue (east), and Springhill Avenue (south). The western edge of the neighborhood runs along Pimlico Road from West Cold Spring Lane to Park Heights Avenue, then along Park Heights Avenue to Springhill Avenue.

== Demographics ==
Greenspring's population is predominantly (97.5%) black. Median household income for the neighborhood was estimated at $26,828 for 2009, which was significantly less than the city median of $38,772.

== Public transportation ==
- CityLink Navy (BaltimoreLink) provides bus service between Sinai Hospital (north) and Downtown Baltimore (south) along Greenspring Avenue.
- LocalLink 28 (BaltimoreLink) runs from the Rogers Avenue Metro Station (west) to Moravia (east) along West Cold Spring Lane.
- LocalLink 85 (BaltimoreLink) operates along Park Heights Avenue from the Penn-North Metro Station (east) and Randallstown (west).
