= Constant Friendship, Maryland =

Unincorporated community in Maryland, U.S.

Coordinates: 39°28′13″N 76°18′39″W

Constant Friendship is an unincorporated community in Harford County, Maryland, United States.

== History ==
Constant Friendship took the name of the 18th-century farm of Thomas White, father of bishop William White.

Since the 1980s, Constant Friendship and the surrounding area has experienced large-scale commercial and residential development.
