= Lisa Belcastro =

American politician (born 1988)

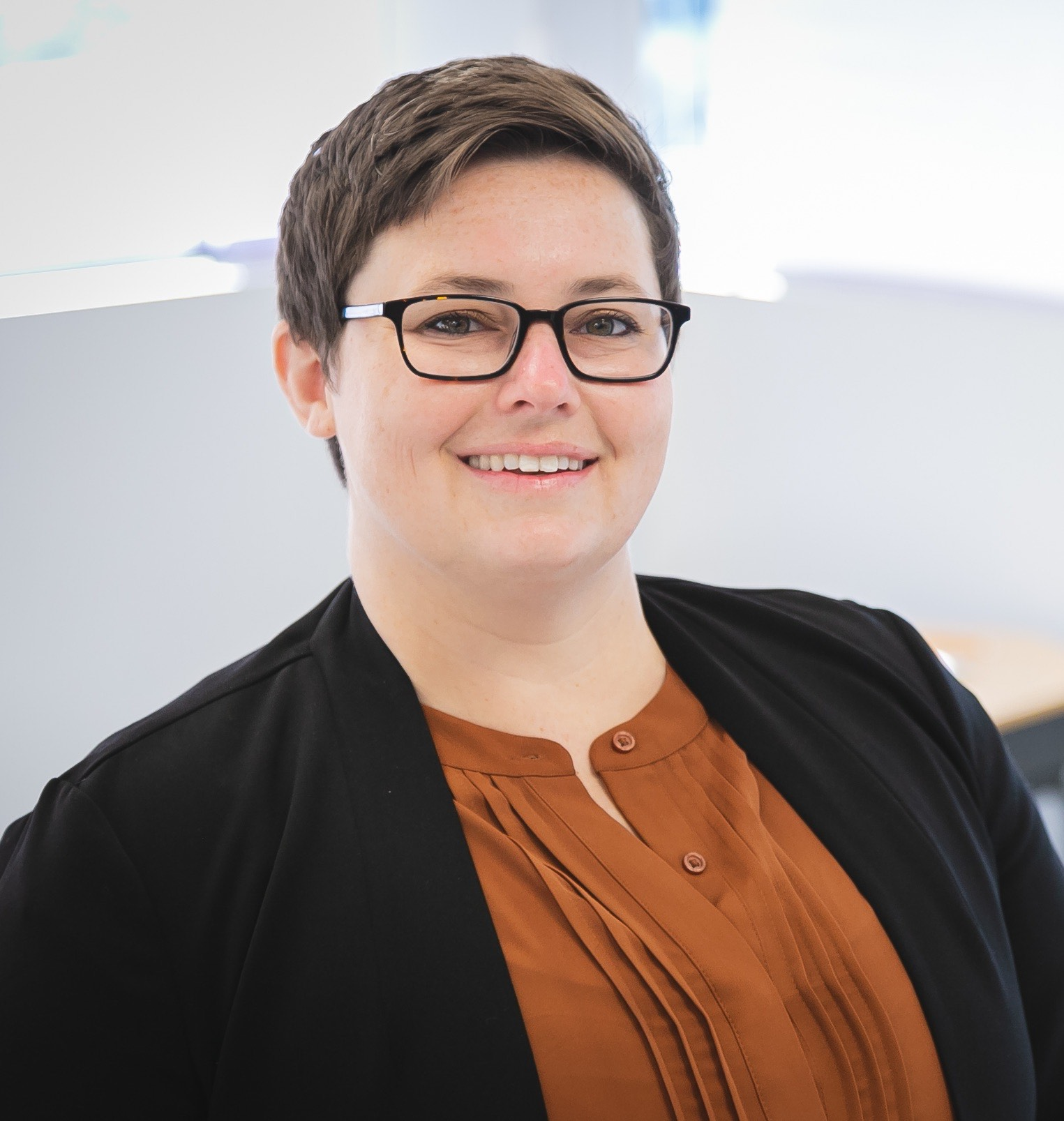
- Belcastro in 2021

Deputy Secretary of the Maryland Department of Disabilities
- Incumbent
- Assumed office May 31, 2023
- Governor: Wes Moore
- Secretary: Carol Beatty
- Preceded by: Christian Miele

Member of the Maryland House of Delegates from the 11th district
- In office March 10, 2020 – January 11, 2023 Serving with Jon Cardin and Dana Stein
- Preceded by: Shelly L. Hettleman
- Succeeded by: Cheryl Pasteur

Personal details
- Born: September 24, 1988 (age 37) Chicago, Illinois, U.S.
- Party: Democratic
- Education: Slippery Rock University (BS)
- Profession: Teacher

Lisa Marie Belcastro (born September 24, 1988) is an American politician who represented the 11th legislative district in the Maryland House of Delegates from 2020 to 2023. She was appointed to office in March 2020 by Governor Larry Hogan on the recommendation of the Baltimore County Democratic Central Committee. Belcastro took the seat vacated by Shelly L. Hettleman when Hettleman was appointed to the Senate seat vacated by Bobby Zirkin, who resigned in January.

== Early life and career ==
Belcastro was born in Chicago, Illinois, on September 24, 1988. She attended Slippery Rock University in Slippery Rock, Pennsylvania, earning a B.S. degree in science health and physical education in 2012. Since graduating, she has worked as an adapted physical education teacher for Prince George's County Public Schools and as an assistant field hockey coach for Goucher College from 2012 to 2017.

Belcastro became involved with politics in 2017 by working as a volunteer coordinator for the Baltimore County Council campaign of Izzy Patoka. From 2019 to 2020, she worked as a legislative aide to Patoka.

In 2020, after Delegate Shelly L. Hettleman was elevated to the Maryland Senate following the resignation of former Senator Robert Zirkin, Belcastro applied to fill the vacancy left by Hettleman in the Maryland House of Delegates. The Baltimore County Democratic Central Committee voted 4–1 to nominate her to fill the vacancy over four other applicants, including former Delegate Ted Levin. Governor Hogan appointed Belcastro to the Maryland House of Delegates on March 10, 2020; she was sworn in the same day.

== In the legislature ==
Belcastro was sworn into the Maryland House of Delegates on March 10, 2020.

Belcastro was defeated for election to her seat in the 2022 Democratic primary. Redistricting had placed the three 11th district incumbents in a 2-seat district; Belcastro placed third in the vote.

=== Committee assignments ===
- Member, Health and Government Operations Committee, 2020–2023 (government operations & health facilities subcommittee, 2020–2021; public health & minority health disparities subcommittee, 2020–2023; health occupations & long-term care subcommittee, 2022–2023)
- Study Group on Economic Stability, 2020–2023

=== Other memberships ===
- Member, Maryland Legislative Latino Caucus, 2020–2023
- Women Legislators of Maryland, 2020–2023

== State government ==
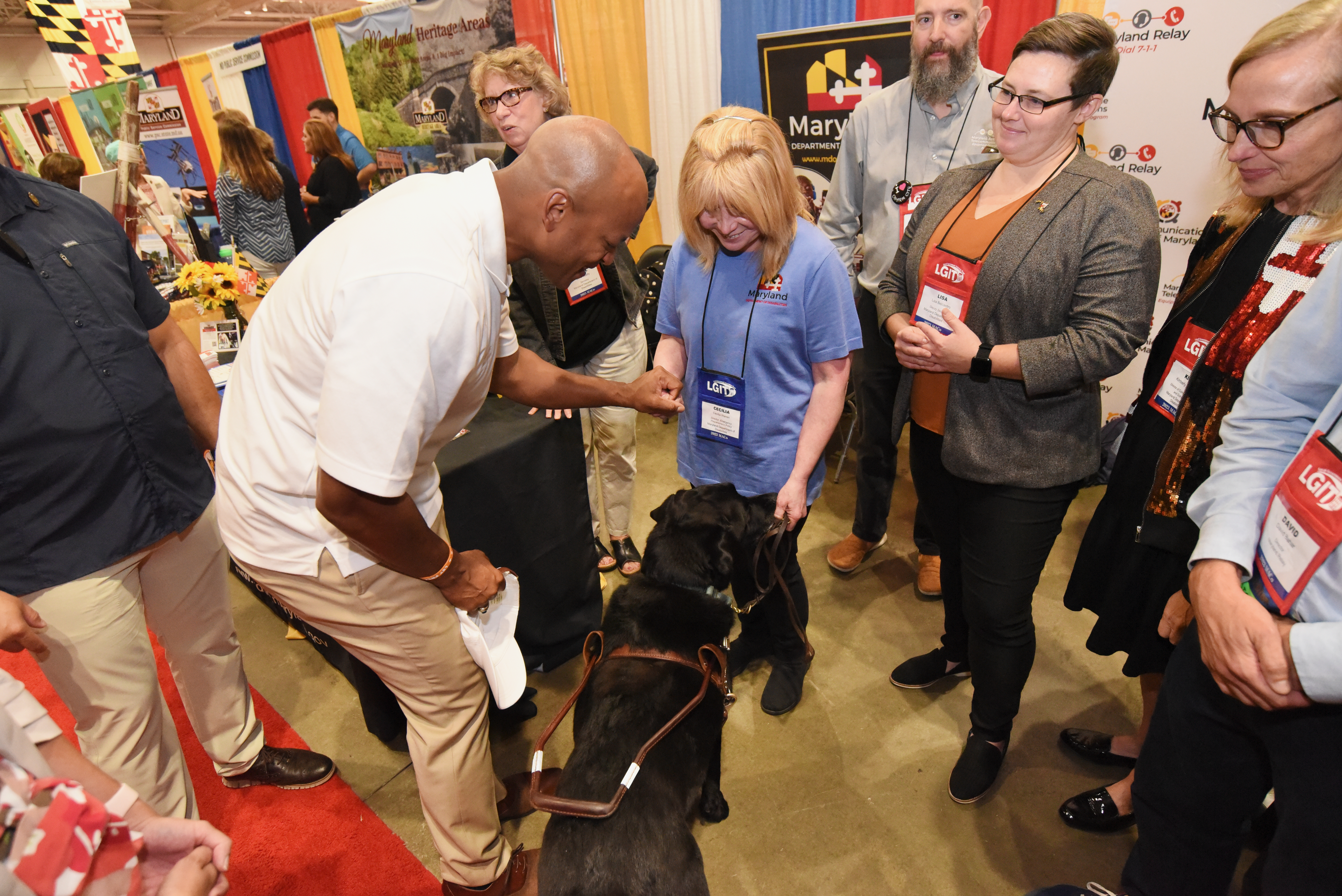
Belcastro with Maryland Department of Disabilities employees and Governor Wes Moore at the Maryland Association of Counties conference, 2023

In April 2023, Belcastro was appointed as the Deputy Secretary of the Maryland Department of Disabilities. She took office on May 31, 2023.

== Personal life ==
Belcastro is openly lesbian and is married to a woman. She lives in the Sudbrook Park neighborhood of Pikesville, Maryland.

== Political positions ==
=== Assisted living ===
Belcastro introduced legislation in the 2021 legislative session that would require updates to Maryland's assisted living facility regulations, with specific protections for memory care units at these facilities. The bill unanimously passed both chambers of the Maryland General Assembly and became law on May 30, 2021.

Belcastro introduced legislation in the 2022 legislative session that requires the Maryland Health Commission to assess standards of care at Maryland's assisted living facilities with 10 or fewer beds.

=== Education ===
In July 2020, Belcastro signed onto a letter calling on the Baltimore County Public Schools system to alter the Student Code of Conduct to explicitly ban wearing or displaying symbols, such as the swastikas and the Confederate flag, unless it is necessary for educational programming.

Belcastro introduced legislation in the 2022 legislative session that would ban the practice of seclusion in public schools. The bill unanimously passed the House of Delegates on March 15, 2022, and is currently on second reading in the Maryland Senate.

=== Guns ===
In April 2020, Belcastro signed onto a letter calling on Governor Larry Hogan to close the state's gun stores during the COVID-19 pandemic.
