= Shelly Hettleman =

American politician (born 1964)

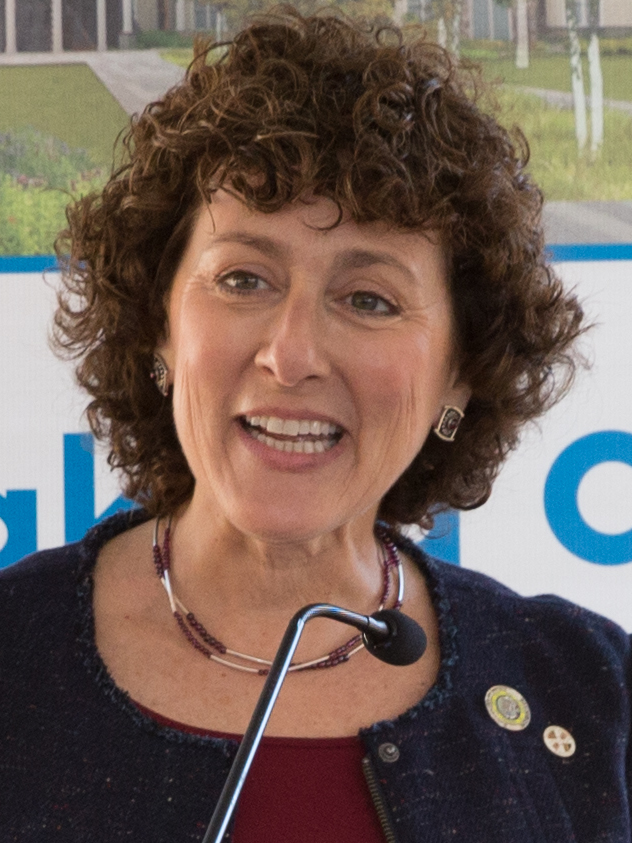

Member of the Maryland Senate from the 11th district
- Incumbent
- Assumed office February 3, 2020
- Appointed by: Larry Hogan
- Preceded by: Robert Zirkin

Member of the Maryland House of Delegates from the 11th district
- In office January 14, 2015 – February 3, 2020
- Preceded by: Jon S. Cardin
- Succeeded by: Lisa Belcastro

Personal details
- Born: August 26, 1964 (age 61) Houston, Texas, U.S.
- Party: Democratic
- Children: 2
- Education: Northwestern University (BA)
- Website: Official website

Michelle Laskin Hettleman (born August 26, 1964) is an American politician who has served in the Maryland Senate representing District 11 since 2020. A member of the Democratic Party, she previously represented the district in the Maryland House of Delegates from 2015 to 2020.

== Background ==
Hettleman was born in Houston, Texas, on August 26, 1964. She is Jewish. Her grandparents came to the United States as refugees to escape the Holocaust.

Hettleman spent her childhood moving between three different places before settling in the Baltimore area shortly before she turned seven years old. She graduated from Pikesville Senior High School and later attended Northwestern University, where she earned a Bachelor of Arts degree in political science in 1986. After graduating, Hettleman briefly moved to Washington, D.C. before moving back to downtown Baltimore, and eventually to Pikesville, Maryland.

Hettleman first became involved in politics while at Northwestern, where she campaigned for Paul Simon's 1984 U.S. Senate campaign. She worked as a scheduler for U.S. Representative Barbara Mikulski's 1986 U.S. Senate campaign. Afterwards, Hettleman worked as a legislative aide to U.S. Representative Ben Cardin until 1990, when she became the director of government relations for various Jewish organizations, including the Baltimore Jewish Council, the Jewish Women's Archive, and the Jewish Community Federation of Baltimore. She eventually worked as a campaign manager for Cardin's U.S. Senate campaigns in 2006 and 2012.

== In the legislature ==
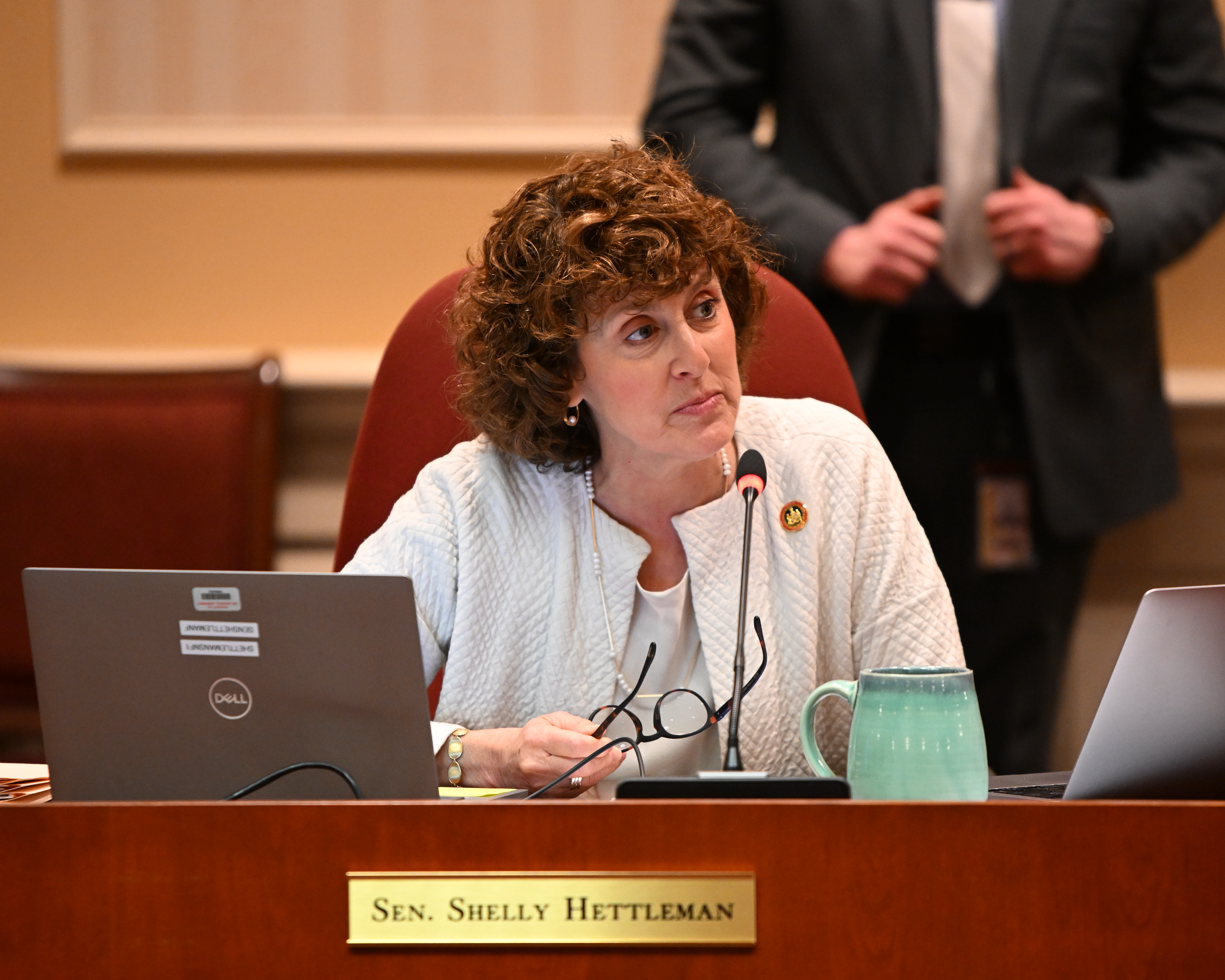
Hettleman in the Budget and Taxation Committee, 2023

Hettleman was sworn into the Maryland House of Delegates on January 14, 2015. She was a member of the Appropriations Committee during her entire tenure. In 2017, Hettleman said she considered challenging state senator Robert Zirkin in the 2018 elections, but instead ran for a second term.

During the 2016 Democratic Party presidential primaries, Hettleman endorsed Hillary Clinton and later served as a delegate to the Democratic National Convention, pledged to Clinton. She later served as a delegate to the 2020 Democratic National Convention, pledged to Joe Biden, and the 2024 Democratic National Convention, pledged to Kamala Harris.

In December 2019, following the resignation of state senator Robert Zirkin, Hettleman said that she would apply to serve the remainder of Zirkin's term in the Maryland Senate. Her candidacy was backed by the Baltimore County Democratic Party. In January 2020, the Baltimore County Democratic Central Committee unanimously voted to nominate her to fill the vacancy, defeating state delegate Jon Cardin and community activist Alan Zukerberg. Governor Larry Hogan appointed her to the seat a few days later, and she was sworn in on February 3.

Hettleman was a member of the Judicial Proceedings Committee until 2023, and has since served on the Budget and Taxation Committee. In October 2023, following the resignation of Melony G. Griffith, Senate President Bill Ferguson appointed her to serve as the chair of the Rules Committee.

In January 2024, Hettleman, along with state delegate Jared Solomon and 20 other Jewish lawmakers, created the Maryland Jewish Legislative Caucus.

== Political positions ==
=== Abortion ===
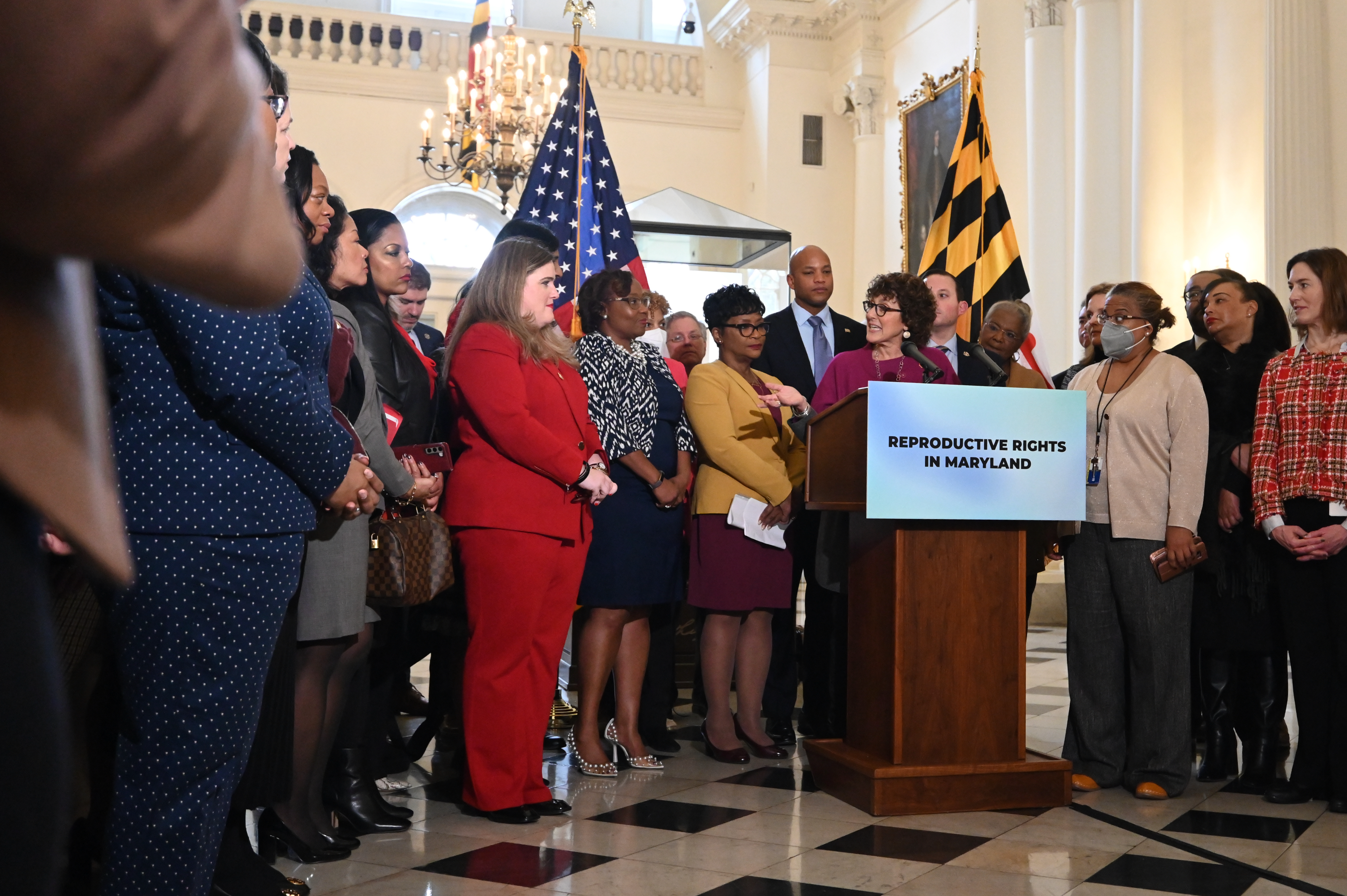
Hettleman speaks at a press conference on reproductive rights, 2023

During the 2017 legislative session, Hettleman introduced legislation that would allow pharmacists to provide patients with oral contraceptives without a prescription, which passed and became law. In 2023, amid the U.S. Supreme Court's decision in Dobbs v. Jackson Women's Health Organization, she introduced legislation that would require patients to provide consent before their records about reproductive health care could cross state lines. The bill passed and was signed into law by Governor Wes Moore.

In January 2019, Hettleman was one of nine Maryland lawmakers to add their names to a manifesto signed by 326 state legislators to reaffirm their commitment to protecting abortion rights.

=== Agriculture ===
During the 2020 legislative session, Hettleman introduced legislation to prohibit hemp farming near residential communities. She later said that she supported hemp expansion, but said that health concerns separated it from right-to-farm laws.

=== Education ===
During the 2016 legislative session, Hettleman introduced legislation to establish the Maryland Corps, which would enable high school graduates to do a gap year in exchange for job training, a $15 minimum wage, and a $6,000 educational grant. The bill passed and became law.

In March 2019, Hettleman joined House Republicans in voting for an amendment to restore budget cuts to the Broadening Options and Opportunities for Students Today (BOOST) program, which provides state-funded scholarships to low-income students to attend private schools. In October, she penned a letter to the Maryland State Department of Education calling for an expansion of its curriculum on the Holocaust.

During her candidacy for the Maryland Senate in December 2019, Hettleman said she would support increasing school construction and implementing the Blueprint for Maryland's Future.

=== Gun policy ===
During the 2023 legislative session, Hettleman introduced a bill that would allow people to opt into a "do not sell" registry that would prohibit gun dealerships from selling them firearms.

=== Health care ===
During the 2019 legislative session, Hettleman voted for the End-of-Life Option Act, which would have provided palliative care to terminally ill adults.

In 2020, Hettleman introduced legislation to allow the state to open supervised injection sites.

In February 2022, Hettleman spoke in support of the Time to Care Act, which would create a state paid family leave program.

=== Housing ===
During the 2021 legislative session, Hettleman introduced legislation that would provide low-income tenants with a right to counsel in eviction cases. In 2022, she introduced bills that would require judges to delay eviction proceedings if a tenant applies for rent assistance, which passed and was vetoed by Governor Larry Hogan.

=== Immigration ===
During the 2026 legislative session, Hettleman introduced a bill that would prohibit federal law enforcement from stopping, detaining, or arresting people for certain offenses near or inside a courthouse.

=== Israel ===
During the 2017 legislative session, Hettleman supported legislation that would ban the state from contracting with companies that support the Boycott, Divestment and Sanctions movement.

=== Labor ===
In 2018, Hettleman supported a bill to raise the state's minimum wage to $15 an hour. During debate on legislation to do so in 2019, she considered introducing an amendment to index the state's minimum wage to inflation, but ultimately decided against doing so, saying it "wasn't the right opportunity" to introduce floor amendments.

During the 2021 legislative session, Hettleman introduced legislation that would provide Baltimore County librarians with collective bargaining rights. The bill passed and became law without Governor Larry Hogan's signature. In January 2020, Baltimore County library employees voted to unionize under the International Association of Machinists and Aerospace Workers.

=== Redistricting ===
In February 2026, Hettleman said she supported pursuing mid-decade redistricting in Maryland and supported holding a vote on a bill that would redraw Maryland's congressional districts to improve the Democratic Party's chances of winning the 1st congressional district, the only congressional district held by Republicans in the state, though she deferred that there are other, more pressing issues the Senate should prioritize over redistricting.

=== Social issues ===
During the 2017 legislative session, Hettleman introduced legislation that would require state police to keep rape kits for 20 years, which passed and became law. She also introduced a bill requiring kits to be tested within 150 days, which died in committee. In 2019, she introduced legislation requiring police to test previously untested rape kits, which passed and became law. The bill's implementation was delayed after Governor Larry Hogan declined to distribute the $3 million in funding to assist with kit testing, which Hettleman condemned. In 2023, she introduced a bill that would require hospitals to extend the time police need to keep rape kits to 75 years and would allow patients and their representatives to track the progress of kit testing. The bill passed and was signed into law by Governor Wes Moore.

During the 2021 legislative session, Hettleman introduced a bill to allow transgender people to change their names without advertising it in newspapers. The bill passed and became law without Governor Larry Hogan's signature.

== Personal life ==
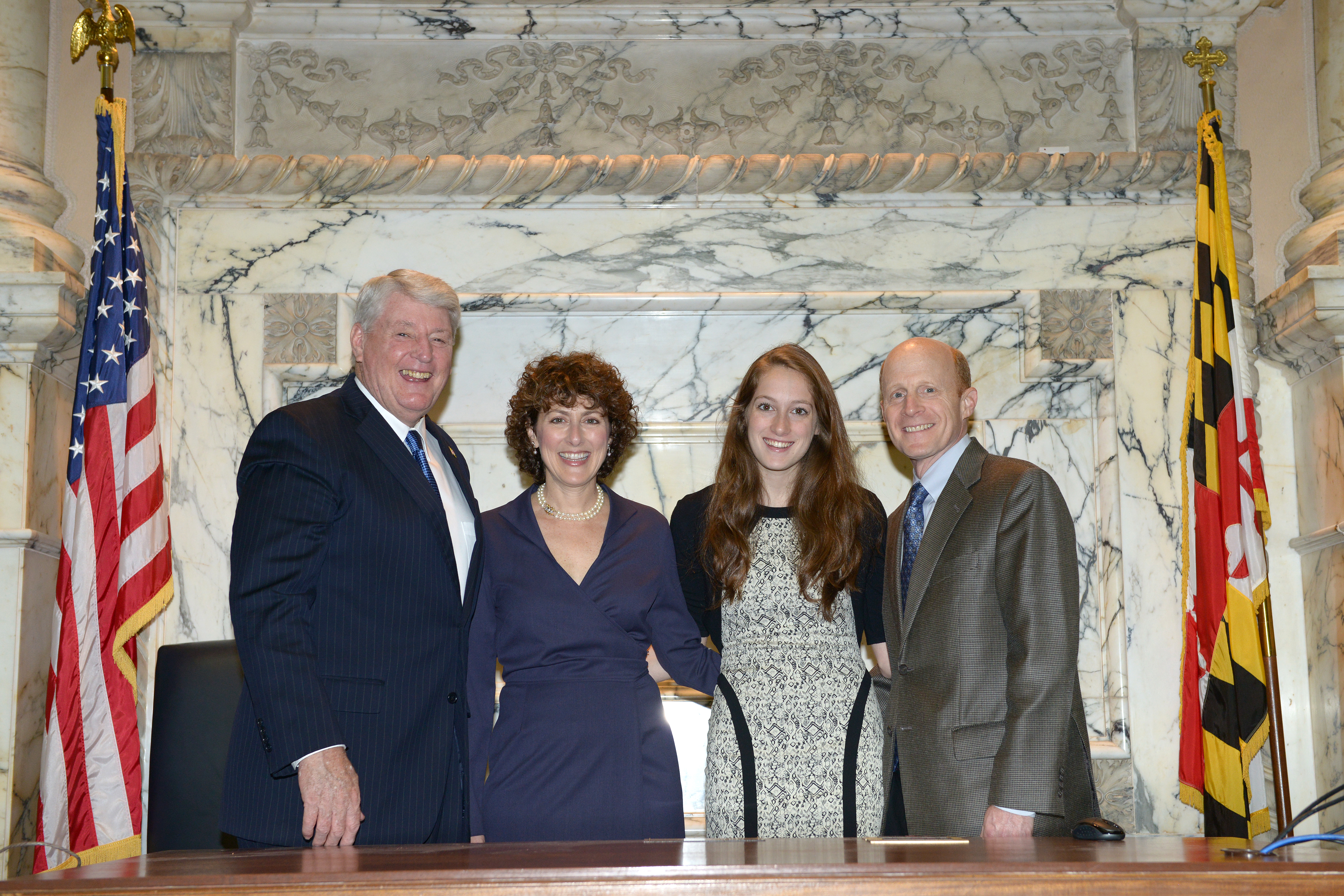
Hettleman with her husband and daughter during her swearing into the Maryland House of Delegates, 2015

Hettleman is married to her husband, Jeffrey. Together, they have two adult children and belong to the Chizuk Amuno Congregation. Kalman "Buzzy" Hettleman, who was the state Secretary of Human Resources under Governor Harry Hughes, is her father-in-law.

== Electoral history ==
Maryland House of Delegates District 11 Democratic primary election, 2014
Party	Candidate	Votes	%
Democratic	Shelly Hettleman	9,923	26.4
Democratic	Dana Stein (incumbent)	9,221	24.5
Democratic	Dan Morhaim (incumbent)	9,049	24.1
Democratic	Theodore Levin	3,998	10.6
Democratic	Don Engel	3,982	10.6
Democratic	Alex B. Leikus	1,434	3.8

Maryland House of Delegates District 11 election, 2014
Party	Candidate	Votes	%
Democratic	Shelly Hettleman	24,197	27.6
Democratic	Dana Stein (incumbent)	23,241	26.5
Democratic	Dan Morhaim (incumbent)	22,991	26.2
Republican	Laura Harkins	16,947	19.3
Write-in		308	0.4

Maryland House of Delegates District 11 election, 2018
Party	Candidate	Votes	%
Democratic	Jon S. Cardin	33,077	29.3
Democratic	Shelly Hettleman (incumbent)	31,957	28.3
Democratic	Dana Stein (incumbent)	30,364	26.9
Republican	Jonathan Porter	16,852	14.9
Write-in		521	0.5

Maryland Senate District 11 Democratic primary election, 2022
Party	Candidate	Votes	%
Democratic	Shelly Hettleman (incumbent)	16,863	100.0

Maryland Senate District 11 election, 2022
Party	Candidate	Votes	%
Democratic	Shelly Hettleman (incumbent)	33,409	71.5
Republican	Ruth Goetz	13,310	28.5
Write-in		34	0.1
