= Pikesville High School =

Public high school in Maryland, US

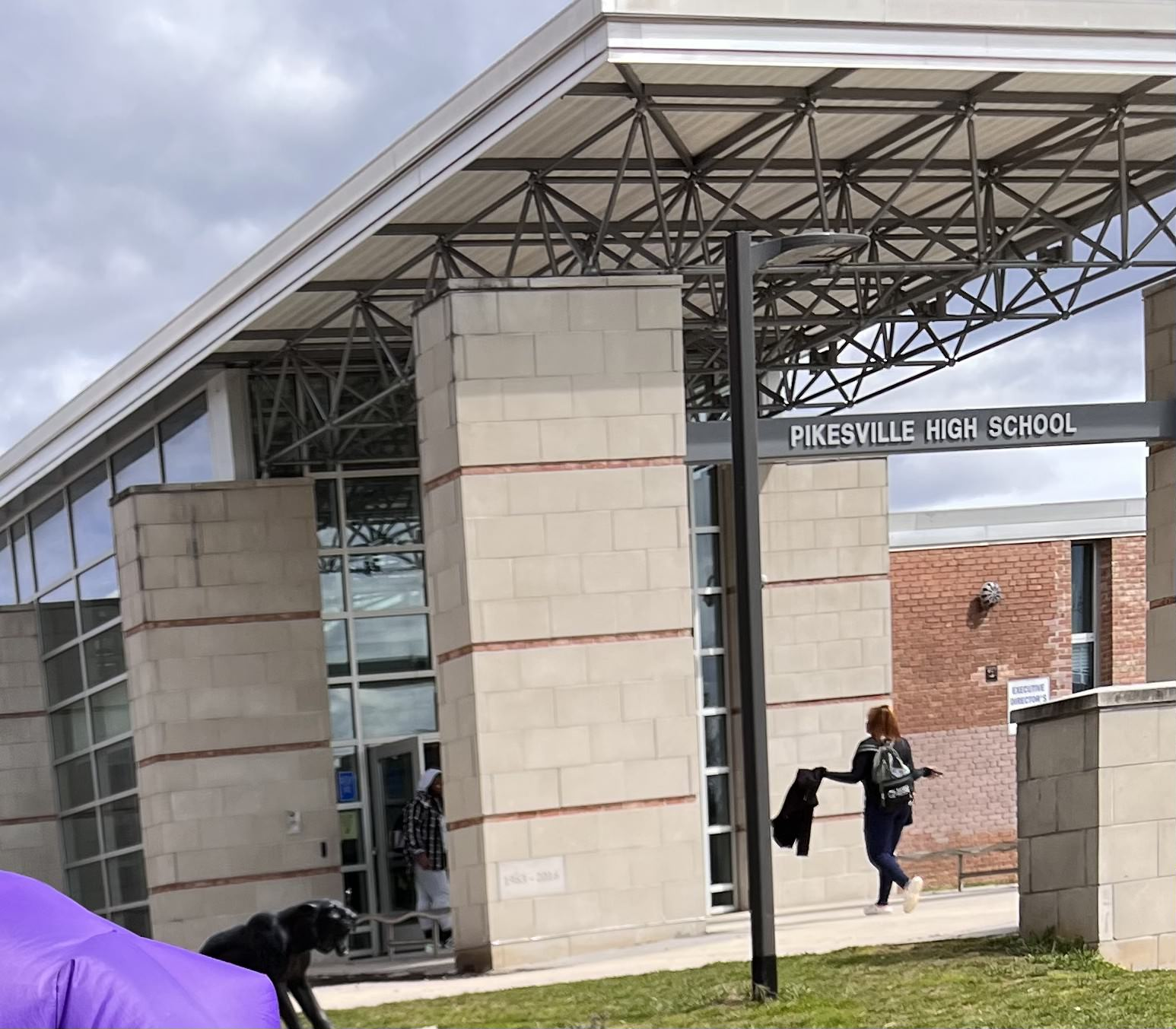
- (2023)

Location
- 7621 Labyrinth Road; Pikesville, Maryland 21208; United States; 39°22′38″N 76°41′55″W

Information
- School type: Public high school Public
- Opened: 1964
- School district: Baltimore County Public Schools
- Superintendent: Darryl Williams
- Principal: April Franklin
- Grades: 9–12
- Hours in school day: 6½
- Campus: Suburban
- Colours: Purple and white
- Slogan: Pride. Honor. Success.
- Mascot: Panthers
- Nickname: The Ville
- Team name: Panthers
- Newspaper: Pipeline
- Yearbook: Pinnacle
- Website: pikesvillehs.bcps.org

Pikesville High School (PHS) is a four-year public high school in Baltimore County, Maryland, United States. It is part of the Baltimore County Public Schools consolidated school district. The school is located in the community of Pikesville, just inside Baltimore County to the northwest of Baltimore City. It is located on the corner of Smith Avenue and Labyrinth Road. The school's district borders Towson High School, Dulaney High School, Owings Mills High School, New Town High School, Randallstown High School, Milford Mill High School, and Woodlawn High School.

== History ==
The school was opened in 1964 as Pikesville Senior High School with grades 9–11 and was renamed in the mid-1980s as part of a countywide grade realignment.

The school received a $40 million renovation, including a math wing and science wing that replaced a single hallway of rooms and adjacent courtyard. The other courtyard was filled with more learning spaces. The cafeteria was expanded along with asbestos removal.

On July 8, 2023, 45-year-old Lakisha Wheeler was fatally shot in the Pikesville High parking lot and was pronounced dead on arrival.

In April 2024, athletic director Dazhon Darien was arrested for using artificial intelligence (A.I.) to impersonate a principal on an audio recording that included racist and antisemitic comments. Darien faced charges that include theft, disrupting school activities, stalking and retaliating against a witness. He accepted a plea deal on the charge of disrupting school activities and was sentenced to 4 months jail.

== Students ==
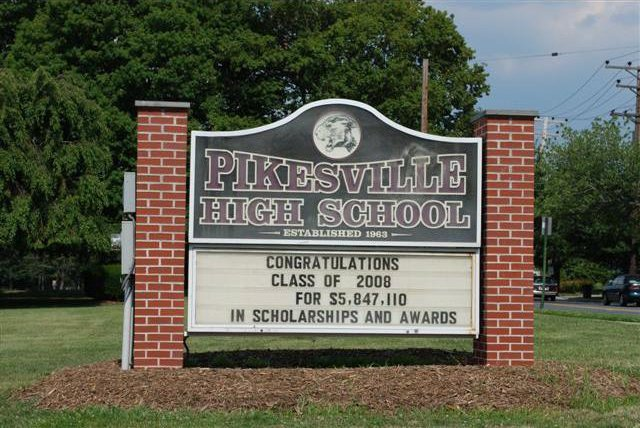
Sign (2008)

The 2023–2024 enrollment at Pikesville High School was 901 students.

== Extracurricular activities ==
Clubs and teams at the school include Spanish club, Jewish Culture Club, Christian Club, Interact, Key Club, Young Democrats and Republicans, National Honor Society, and Science Club. Many of the teams include Model UN, Model OAS, It's Academic, Mock Trial, and Model Congress.

== Athletics ==
=== State championships ===
Golf

- 1A/2A 2000, 2001

Boys Soccer

- 1A 2016

Girls Basketball

- 1A 2019, 2022, 2023, 2024

Girls Indoor Track

- 1A 2014

Boys Indoor Track

- 1A 2013

Baseball

- Class B 1986

Boys Lacrosse

- 2A-1A 2001, 2004, 2009
- Ron Belinko Sportsmanship Award 2002

Softball

- Eugene Robertson Sportsmanship Award 2017

Boys Track and Field

- 1A 2014

== Notable alumni ==
- Miša Aleksić - bass guitarist for Riblja Čorba
- Mark Elliott Brecher - retired chief medical officer LabCorp, Emeritus Professor University of North Carolina
- Elise Burgin - professional tennis player
- Gary Gensler - named CFO of Hillary Clinton's presidential campaign 2015; served in the United States Department of the Treasury as assistant secretary for financial institutions from 1997 to 1999
- Karen Hesse - author
- Shelly L. Hettleman - member of the Maryland Senate
- Hellin Kay - filmmaker and photographer
- Jeffrey Kluger - author of Lost Moon: the Perilous Voyage of Apollo 13, the basis of the movie Apollo 13
- Daniel Lipman - Emmy Award-winning television writer of An Early Frost and Queer as Folk
- Ken Mehlman - former chairman of the Republican National Committee (2005 to 2007)
- Jeff Pinkner - television writer and producer known for his work on Alias and Lost
- Marc Platt - producer of Legally Blonde.
- Mike Sager - best-selling author
- Jesse Schwartzman - professional lacrosse player
- Wendy Sherman - former United States deputy secretary of state
- Ryan Spiegel - member of the Maryland House of Delegates and former member of the Gaithersburg, Maryland city council
- Bert Vogelstein - oncologist at The Johns Hopkins Medical School and Sidney Kimmel Comprehensive Cancer Center
- Ellis Weiner - author
- Bobby Zirkin - former member of the Maryland Senate

Fictional Alumni

- John Munch - detective on Homicide: Life on the Street and Law & Order: Special Victims Unit

== See also ==
- List of Schools in Baltimore County, Maryland
