= Paula Hollinger =

American politician (1940–2026)

Paula C. Hollinger

Member of the Maryland Senate from the 11th district
- In office January 14, 1987 – January 10, 2007
- Succeeded by: Robert Zirkin

Member of the Maryland House of Delegates from the 12th and 11th district
- In office January 1979 – January 1987

Personal details
- Born: December 30, 1940 Washington, D.C., U.S.
- Died: March 25, 2026 (aged 85) Florida, U.S.
- Party: Democratic
- Spouse: Paul
- Children: 3
- Occupation: Politician; nurse; educator

Paula C. Hollinger (December 30, 1940 – March 25, 2026) was an American politician who was a member of the Maryland Senate representing the 11th district from 1987 to 2007. A member of the Democratic Party, she represented the 11th and 12th districts in the Maryland House of Delegates from 1979 to 1987.

== Life and career ==
Hollinger served as the associate director for health workforce in the Maryland Department of Health and Mental Hygiene, retiring in 2015. Until 2007, she served in the Maryland State Senate as a Senate Committee Chair, and was a candidate for Maryland's third congressional district in 2006. The seat was being vacated by Ben Cardin, who was seeking the Democratic nomination for the United States Senate seat being vacated by Senator Paul Sarbanes. She came in third place in a field of eight other Democrats, garnering 21.3% of the vote.

She was in the General Assembly for 28 years. She was elected as a delegate in 1979, and became a state senator in 1986.

Hollinger chaired the Senate Education, Health, and Environmental Affairs Committee in the Maryland General Assembly, serving as the only woman to chair one of the four standing senate committees.

She worked as a nurse, teacher and lecturer. Hollinger was a delegate for then Georgia Governor Jimmy Carter at the 1976 Democratic Convention, she also attended the 2000 Democratic Convention as a delegate for former Vice President Al Gore.

Hollinger married her husband, Paul, in 1962. The couple had three children and seven grandchildren. She died at her home in Florida on March 25, 2026, from leukemia. Hollinger was 85. She was Jewish.
