= Robert Zirkin =

American politician (born 1971)

Bobby Zirkin
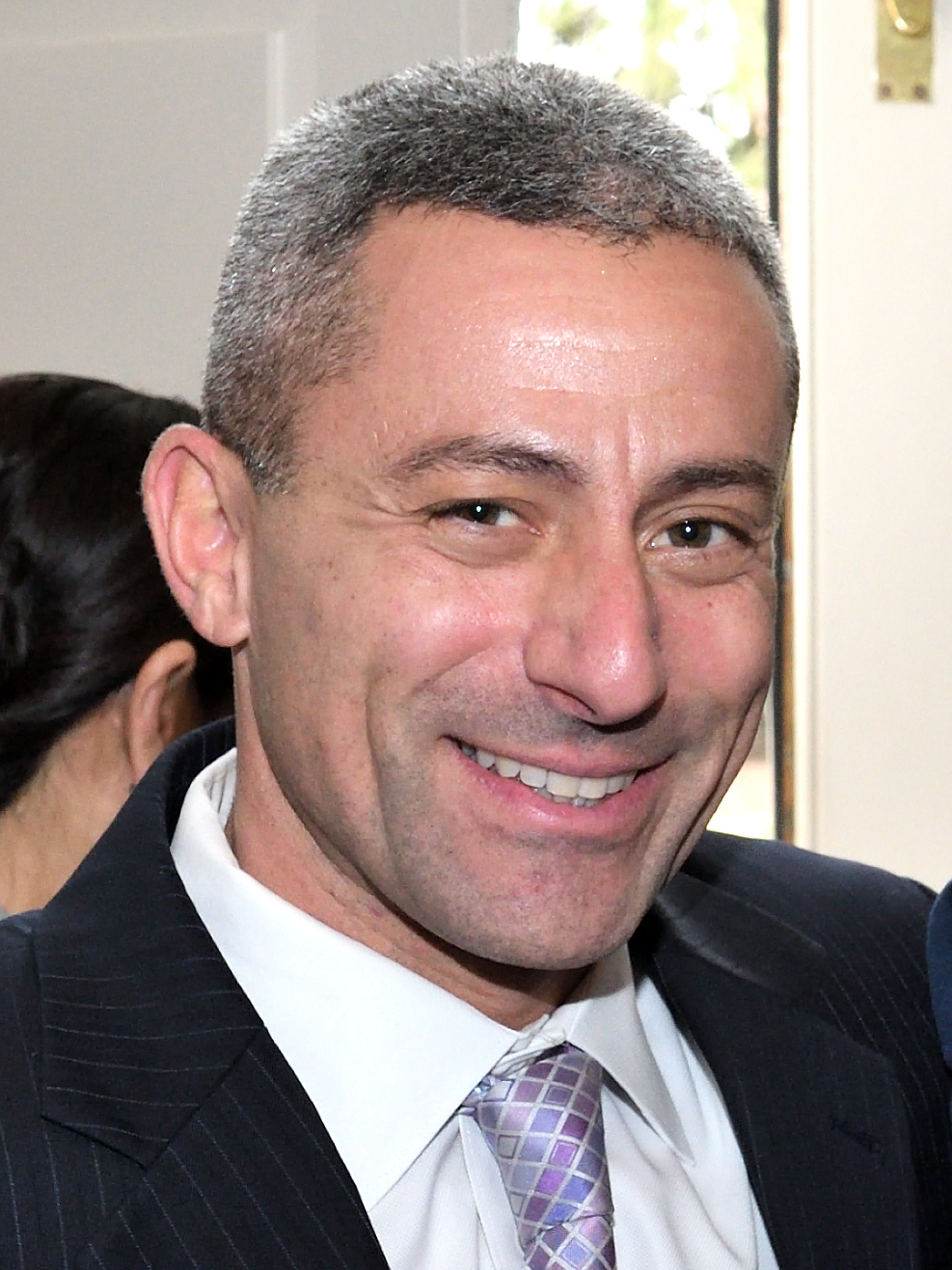
- Zirkin in 2019

Member of the Maryland Senate from the 11th district
- In office January 10, 2007 – January 1, 2020
- Preceded by: Paula Hollinger
- Succeeded by: Shelly L. Hettleman

Member of the Maryland House of Delegates from the 11th district
- In office January 13, 1999 – January 10, 2007
- Preceded by: Robert L. Frank
- Succeeded by: Dana Stein

Personal details
- Born: Robert Alan Zirkin; April 24, 1971 (age 55) Davis, California, U.S.
- Party: Democratic
- Spouse: Tina
- Children: 2
- Education: Johns Hopkins University (BA); Georgetown University (JD)

Robert Alan Zirkin (born April 24, 1971) is an American politician who was a member of the Maryland Senate from the 11th district from 2007 to 2020. A member of the Democratic Party, he previously represented the district in the Maryland House of Delegates from 1999 to 2007.

== Early life and education ==
Zirkin was born in Davis, California, on April 24, 1971, to Barry and Barbara Zirkin. He grew up in Pikesville, Maryland and graduated from Pikesville High School. He later attended the London School of Economics through American University in 1992 and graduated from Johns Hopkins University with a Bachelors of Arts degree in political science with honors in 1993, and Georgetown University, where he earned his Juris Doctor degree in 1998. He was admitted to the Maryland Bar in 2000.

== Career ==
Zirkin says he has been involved in politics since he was in elementary school, when his parents would take him canvassing while volunteering for local campaigns, including for the Smith-Greenspring Association. After graduating from Johns Hopkins, he served as the president of Young Democrats of Maryland from 1994 to 1995 and spoke at the 1996 Democratic National Convention.

Zirkin operated his own solo practice from 2008 to 2015, afterwards opening the Zirkin and Schmerling Law firm, which focuses on personal injury, criminal law, family law, medical malpractice, and workers' compensation.

=== Maryland General Assembly ===
Zirkin was elected to the Maryland House of Delegates in 1998 and sworn in on January 13, 1999. He was a member of the Judiciary Committee during his entire tenure, including as the chair of its juvenile law subcommittee from 2003 to 2007, and was a member of the Baltimore County Delegation.

On July 18, 2005, Zirkin announced that he would run for the Maryland Senate in District 11, seeking to succeed Paula Hollinger, who retired to run for the U.S. House of Representatives in Maryland's 3rd congressional district. He won the September 2006 Democratic primary with 71.3 percent of the vote, and defeated Republican Jeffrey Yablon in the general election.

Zirkin was sworn into the Maryland Senate on January 10, 2007. He was a member of the Budget and Taxation Committee during his first term from 2007 to 2010, afterwards serving in the Judicial Proceedings Committee for the remainder of his tenure. Media outlets described Zirkin as a centrist and political moderate who frequently clashed with progressive groups, legislators, and activists. After state senator Brian Frosh was elected Attorney General of Maryland in November 2014, Senate President Thomas V. Miller Jr. appointed Zirkin as the chair of the Judicial Proceedings Committee.

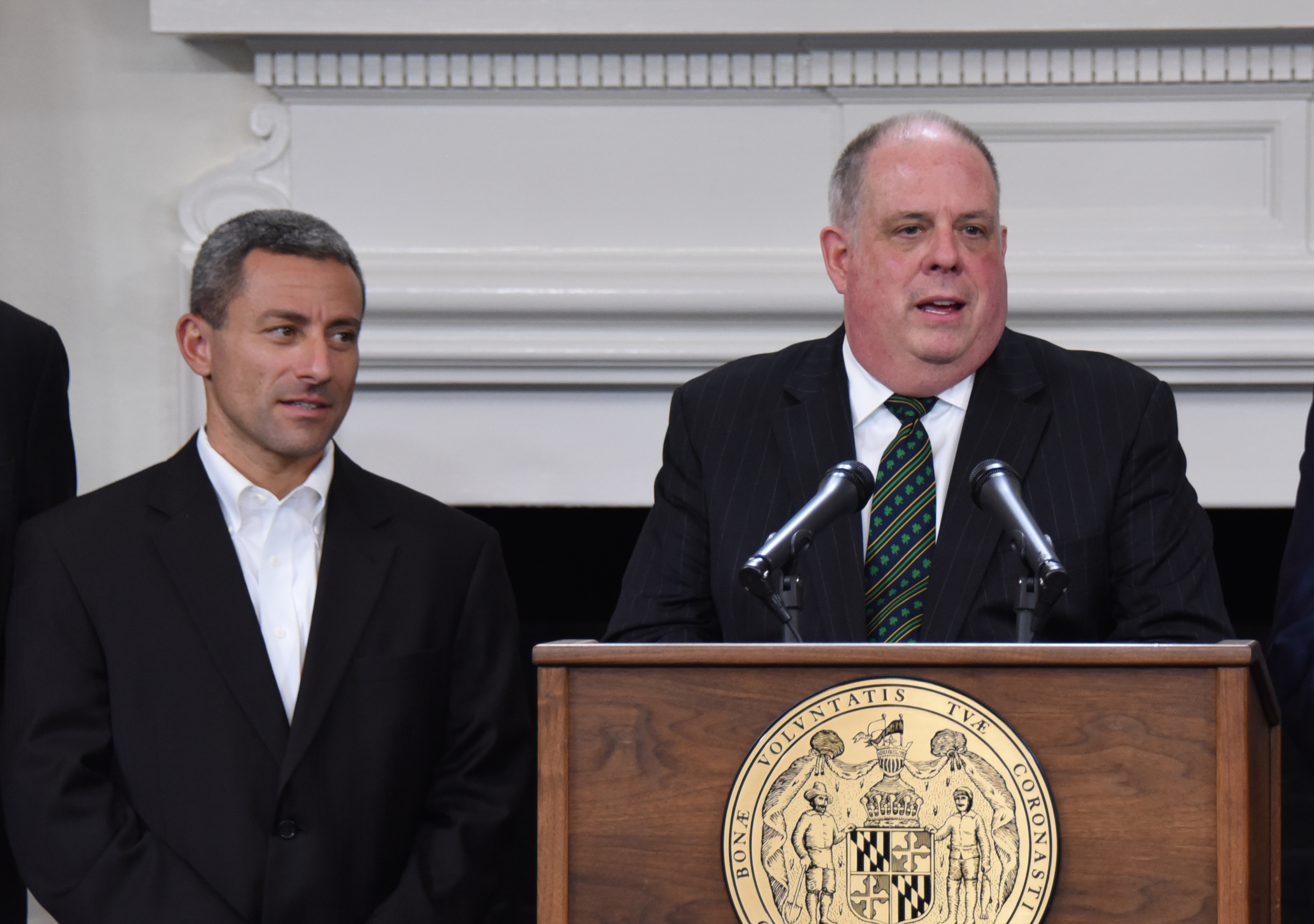
Zirkin with Governor Larry Hogan during his press conference on fracking, 2017

Zirkin has a history of ingratiating himself with Republicans in the General Assembly and Governor Larry Hogan. During his tenure in the legislature, Zirkin attended Hogan's 2017 press conference where he announced his support for Zirkin's bill to ban fracking in Maryland; endorsed Republicans in competitive county executive elections; and appeared at several fundraisers held by Republican members of the Judicial Proceedings committee. During an August 2018 interview with the Daily Record, Zirkin accused Ben Jealous, the Democratic nominee for governor in the 2018 Maryland gubernatorial election, of attempting to politicize judicial appointments in Maryland, which he considered out of character for the state, and criticized his criminal justice platform as being unrealistic. Despite this, Zirkin did not endorse either candidate in the general election.

Zirkin became less focused on his legislative career after his mother died from cancer in June 2019, prompting rumors that he would resign. Zirkin resigned from the Senate effective January 1, 2020, saying that politics had become too divisive and driven by special interests and social media. He was succeeded by state delegate Shelly L. Hettleman.

=== Post-legislative career ===
In December 2020, a year after his resignation, Zirkin started his own lobbying firm, Zirkin & Schmerling Government Relations. He lobbied on behalf of the Catholic Church in opposition to the Maryland Child Victims Act, which would extend the statute of limitations for child sex abuse cases. After the bill passed during the 2023 legislative session, Zirkin was reported to be advertising services to abuse survivors.

In May 2024, former Republican Governor Larry Hogan announced that Zirkin would co-chair the "Democrats for Hogan" organization supporting his 2024 U.S. Senate campaign. In interviews with The Washington Post and Maryland Matters, Zirkin said that he was supporting Hogan in part because of his positions on Israel, noting that Alsobrooks had been endorsed by U.S. senator Chris Van Hollen, who has been critical of U.S. support for Israel's military amid the Gaza war. In August 2025, Zirkin criticized Alsobrooks for voting for resolutions to block U.S. arms sales to Israel amid increasing warnings about the famine in Gaza, saying that she had "absolutely broken" the promises she made to Jewish voters during her 2024 campaign.

In June 2026, Zirkin started his own podcast, Across the Aisle, through The Baltimore Sun.

== Political positions ==
=== Crime ===
During the 2009 legislative session, Zirkin amended a bill partially repealing the death penalty to require a murderer's conviction to be based on DNA evidence to be eligible for the death sentence. He was considered to be the swing vote for a bill to repeal the death penalty in Maryland in 2013, which he ultimately supported, but later said that he had no moral qualms with seeing "horrible monsters" being put to death.

During the 2014 legislative session, Zirkin opposed a bill to reform the state's bail-setting practices to use computers instead of District Court commissioners to determine who should go free pending trial, instead supporting a bill that would add an amendment to the Constitution of Maryland to overturn the Maryland Court of Appeals' unanimous 2017 decision that prohibits judges from setting bails that defendants are unable to pay.

During the 2018 legislative session, Zirkin introduced an omnibus crime bill that would increase the maximum penalties for using a gun while committing a violent felony from 20 to 40 years in prison, provide $21 million to violence prevention programs over four years, and repeal a law that allows defendants charged with or serving a sentence for a violent crime to be transferred from jail for drug treatment. Many of the bill's provisions were taken from proposals by Republican Governor Larry Hogan, who introduced them as part of a package of bills to combat street violence and reimplement mandatory minimum sentencing. The bill was opposed by Progressive Maryland, who called it "racially bigoted injustice" written by white supremacists that is designed for mass incarceration of Black people and "genocide". In response, Zirkin spoke on the Senate floor against Progressive Maryland, calling the group's members "lint" and "crazies" and condemning the group's use of the term genocide as it evoked memories of the Holocaust. Zirkin's bill passed the Senate, but was rejected by the House of Delegates.

During the 2019 legislative session, Zirkin introduced Grace's Law 2.0, which increased the state's penalties for cyber harassment from a maximum penalty of a year in jail and a $500 fine to three years in prison and a $10,000 fine. The bill was named for Grace McComas, a 15-year-old who took their own life in 2012 following online taunts and hate speech. The bill unanimously passed the General Assembly and was signed into law by Governor Larry Hogan.

=== Environment ===
Zirkin repeatedly introduced bills to ban fracking in Maryland, including in 2017, which passed and was signed into law by Governor Larry Hogan. During the 2015 legislative session, he introduced a bill to hold energy companies financially liable for injury, death, or loss of property caused by fracking.

=== Gun control ===
During the 2013 legislative session, Zirkin amended the Firearm Safety Act to add a provision banning patients admitted to a hospital for emergency mental health evaluations on the recommendation of a doctor from purchasing a firearm. In 2016, he supported a bill to ban guns from college campuses. In 2019, Zirkin voted for a bill to repeal Maryland's Handgun Permit Review Board.

=== Immigration ===
During the 2017 legislative session, Zirkin opposed the Trust Act, which would prohibit local authorities from cooperating with U.S. Immigration and Customs Enforcement (ICE). After the bill failed to pass that year, state delegate Joseline Peña-Melnyk criticized Zirkin as a "Democrat In Name Only" and called on his constituents to vote against him in the Democratic primaries that year. During a Jews United for Justice meeting in July 2017, he said that he supported "nine out of ten provisions in the bill", but opposed the provision that would prohibit detainee fingerprints from going to ICE, which he worried would protect people on the Terrorist Screening Database.

=== Israel ===
During the 2017 legislative session, Zirkin introduced a bill that would prohibit the state from contracting with companies that support the Boycott, Divestment and Sanctions movement. After the bill failed to pass, Governor Larry Hogan signed an executive order codifying it into law.

In October 2025, Zirkin wrote an op-ed for The Baltimore Sun criticizing U.S. senator Chris Van Hollen for his criticism of Israel and for endorsing Zohran Mamdani, the Democratic nominee in the 2025 New York City mayoral election, accusing both of spreading Hamas propaganda.

=== Marijuana ===
During the 2013 legislative session, Zirkin introduced a bill to decriminalize the possession of small amounts of marijuana and reduce fines for possession to a maximum of $100. He reintroduced the bill in 2014, during which it passed and was signed into law by Governor Martin O'Malley.

=== Paid sick leave ===
Zirkin voted against a bill that would require employers to pay sick leave during the 2017 legislative session, but voted in January 2018 to override Governor Larry Hogan's veto on the bill.

=== Social issues ===
In 2006, Zirkin opposed attempts to force a vote on an amendment to the Constitution of Maryland to ban gay marriage in 2006. He was a co-sponsor of the Civil Marriage Protection Act, which legalized same-sex marriage in Maryland in 2012, and of a 2014 bill to prohibit discrimination against transgender people in housing, employment, and public accommodations.

During the 2013 legislative session, Zirkin introduced a bill that would ban smoking in cars when there is a passenger younger than eight years old. The bill passed the Senate, but died in the House of Delegates.

During the 2016 legislative session, Zirkin pushed for an amendment to weaken Alex and Calvin's Law—a bill to increase penalties for people who provide alcohol to someone younger than 21 years old—by only allowing jail time and higher fines only if the adult in question "knew or should have known" that an underage drinker would drive, and if the driver caused "serious injury or death to the individual or another." He also sought to introduce an amendment to Noah's Law—a bill expanding the use of ignition locks on drunk drivers' vehicles—that would allow punitive damages in civil lawsuits involving drunk drivers.

In March 2016, Zirkin supported a bill to limit when the Maryland Transit Administration could use devices to record the conversations of passengers, calling it "indiscriminate mass surveillance" and an encroachment of people's privacy rights.

During the 2017 legislative session, Zirkin expressed concerns with a bill that would allow a woman who becomes pregnant during a rape to terminate the attacker's parental rights, saying that he was troubled with the idea of a man losing his parental rights without being convicted of sexual assault. After the Senate Judicial Proceedings committee made changes to the bill following its passage in the House of Delegates, Zirkin appointed himself, bill sponsor William C. Smith Jr., and Michael Hough to a conference committee to negotiate the final wording of the bill. The committee appeared to reach an agreement, but could not get the bill's new text printed before the legislature adjourned sine die at midnight.

During the 2019 legislative session, Zirkin voted for the End-of-Life Option Act, which would provide terminally ill patients with medical aid in dying, after adding amendments to the bill to raise the age limit, require mental health assessments, and remove immunity clauses for doctors who offer the prescriptions.

=== Taxes ===
During the 2012 legislative session, Zirkin opposed a bill to raise taxes on Marylanders that earn at least half a million dollars a year, accusing legislators of singling out a certain class.

== Personal life ==
Zirkin is married to his wife Tina. Together, they have two daughters and live in Pikesville, Maryland. He is Jewish and a member of the Chizuk Amuno Congregation in Stevenson, Maryland.

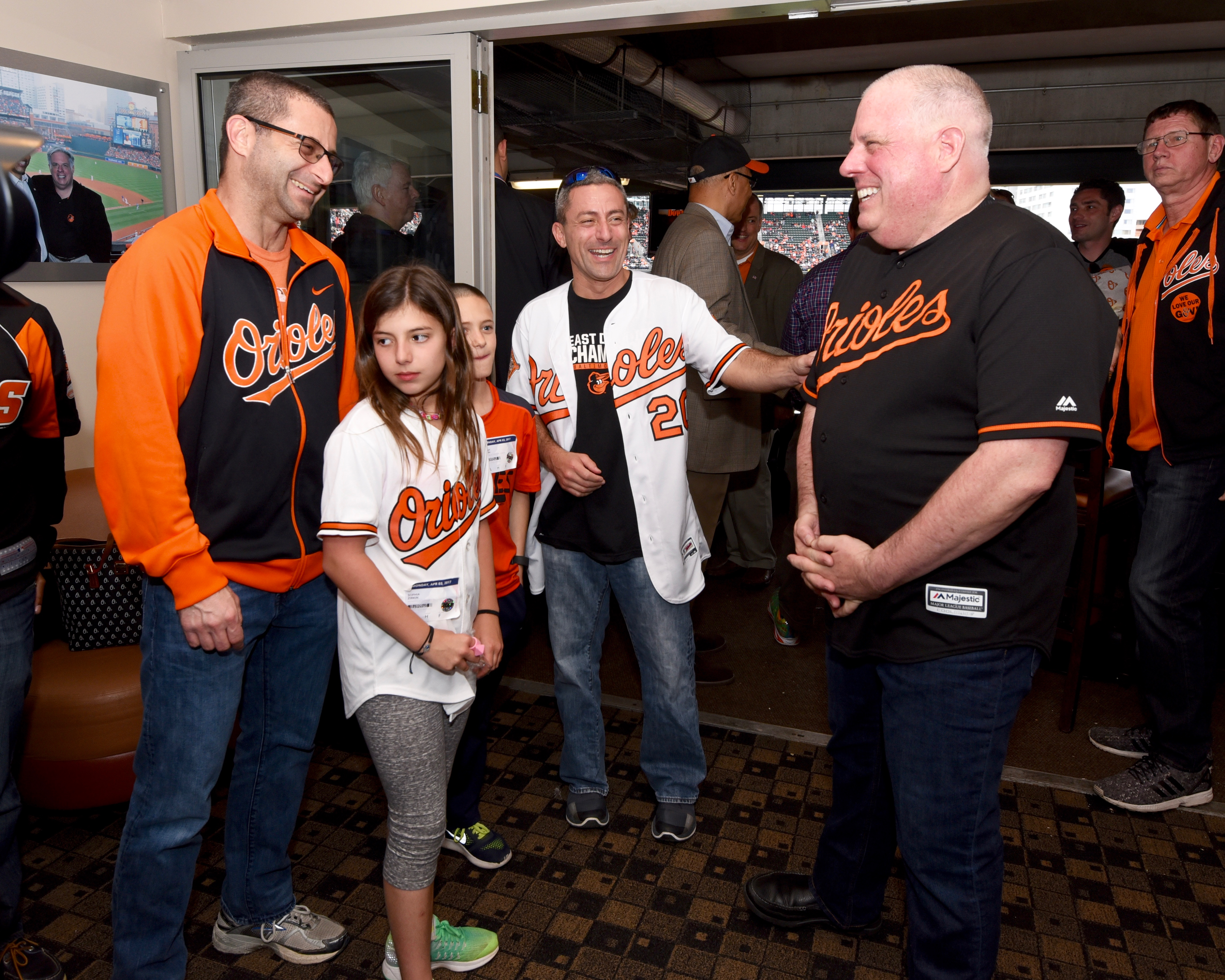
Zirkin at the Orioles' 2017 Opening Day game with Governor Hogan

In April 2017, Zirkin threw the first pitch at Oriole Park at Camden Yards on Opening Day.

== Electoral history ==
Maryland House of Delegates District 11 Democratic primary election, 1998
Party	Candidate	Votes	%
Democratic	Michael J. Finifter	7,350	24.6
Democratic	Dan K. Morhaim	5,656	18.9
Democratic	Robert Zirkin	5,178	17.3
Democratic	Robert L. Frank (incumbent)	5,082	17.0
Democratic	Robyn I. Stevens	3,693	12.4
Democratic	Theodore Levin	2,900	9.7

Maryland House of Delegates District 11 general election, 1998
Party	Candidate	Votes	%
Democratic	Michael J. Finifter	26,823	21.5
Democratic	Dan K. Morhaim	26,452	21.2
Democratic	Robert Zirkin	24,231	19.4
Republican	Virginia G. Schuster	17,825	14.3
Republican	Christian Cavey	15,574	12.5
Republican	Grant Harding	13,710	11.0
Independent	William T. Newton (write-in)	64	0.1

Maryland House of Delegates District 11 general election, 2002
Party	Candidate	Votes	%
Democratic	Robert Zirkin (incumbent)	30,467	23.5
Democratic	Jon Cardin	29,480	22.7
Democratic	Dan K. Morhaim (incumbent)	28,098	21.7
Republican	J. Michael Collins Sr.	14,601	11.3
Republican	Betty L. Wagner	13,483	10.4
Republican	Grant Harding	13,411	10.3
Write-in		130	0.1

Maryland Senate District 11 Democratic primary election, 2006
Party	Candidate	Votes	%
Democratic	Robert Zirkin	14,362	71.3
Democratic	Scott Rifkin	5,779	28.7

Maryland Senate District 11 general election, 2006
Party	Candidate	Votes	%
Democratic	Robert Zirkin	34,782	70.8
Republican	Jeffrey S. Yablon	14,312	29.1
Write-in		46	0.1

Maryland Senate District 11 general election, 2010
Party	Candidate	Votes	%
Democratic	Robert Zirkin (incumbent)	38,730	98.4
Write-in		644	1.6

Maryland Senate District 11 general election, 2014
Party	Candidate	Votes	%
Democratic	Robert Zirkin (incumbent)	30,201	97.5
Write-in		765	2.5

Maryland's 11th Senate district general election, 2018
Party	Candidate	Votes	%
Democratic	Robert Zirkin (incumbent)	40,472	96.9
Write-in		1,299	3.1
