= Hellin Kay =

Hellin Kay (born October 5, 1972) is a filmmaker and photographer based in New York City.

Born in Moscow, Russia, she moved to the United States when she was seven years old. She attended Pikesville High School in Baltimore, Maryland and then Bard College in New York where she graduated with a BA and MFA in film.

== Career ==
She entered the fashion publishing world in 1998 as assistant to American fashion editor Polly Mellen, who was then creative director of Allure magazine.

She has been a freelance contributor to magazines such as L'Uomo Vogue, British Vogue, i-D, Elle, Nylon, French, Blackbook, Glamour and Teen Vogue. She was also a staff fashion director at Spoon Paris and the Russian editions of Vogue, Harper's Bazaar and Elle.

She debuted her photography work in a solo show at Bronwyn Keenan Gallery in New York in 2002. Other solo exhibitions were held at the Red October Gallery in Moscow, Russia, and the Rubin Chapelle Gallery in New York. She has been featured in group shows including "Benefit for 911" at the Lexington Armory in 2002, the "iD Anniversary Show" at Milk Studios in 2005, and "No Money Down" at Gallery Aferro in 2006.

Her autobiographical short film Was Once A Girl, based on her immigration to the United States, was screened at the International Feature Film Market in 1997. The film won Best Short at the San Diego Film Festival.

Other works in her filmography include the music video for New York-based musician Reni Lane's 2006 release "Choices". She also directed two music videos for Taryn Manning.

She has worked on advertising campaigns and consulted for brands such as Club Monaco, Shoemint, Anthropologie, Guess, Enza Costa, Selfridges London and Joe's Jeans.
