= Dana Stein =

American politician (born 1958)

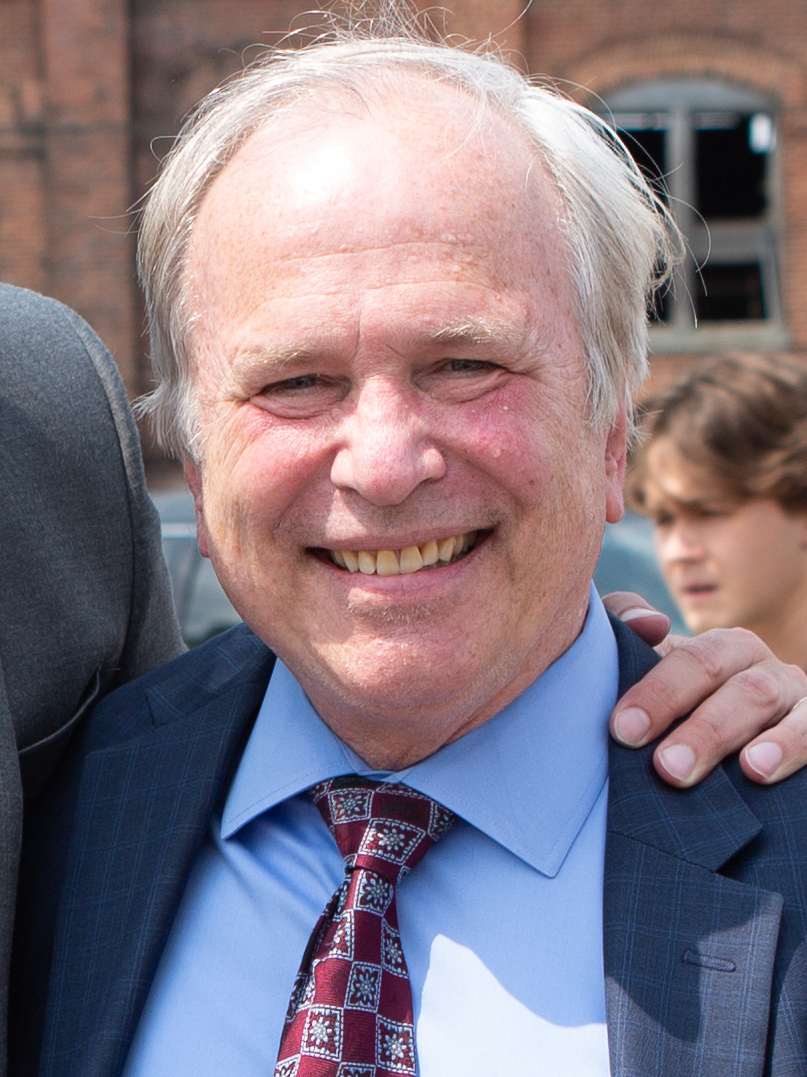
- Stein in 2023

Speaker of the Maryland House of Delegates
- Acting
- In office December 4, 2025 – December 16, 2025
- Preceded by: Adrienne A. Jones
- Succeeded by: Joseline Peña-Melnyk

Speaker pro tempore of the Maryland House of Delegates
- In office January 10, 2024 – January 14, 2026
- Preceded by: Sheree Sample-Hughes
- Succeeded by: Luke Clippinger

Member of the Maryland House of Delegates
- Incumbent
- Assumed office January 10, 2007 Serving with Jon Cardin
- Preceded by: Robert Zirkin
- Constituency: District 11 (2007–2023); District 11B (2023–present)
- In office June 25, 2002 – January 8, 2003 Serving with Dan K. Morhaim, Robert Zirkin
- Appointed by: Parris Glendening
- Preceded by: Michael Finifter
- Succeeded by: Jon Cardin
- Constituency: District 11

Personal details
- Born: Dana Max Stein; September 19, 1958 (age 68) Baltimore, Maryland, U.S.
- Party: Democratic
- Spouse: Margaret Presley
- Children: 3
- Education: Harvard University (BA); Princeton University (MPA); Columbia University (JD)
- Website: Campaign website

Dana Max Stein (born September 19, 1958) is an American politician who has served as a member of the Maryland House of Delegates, representing District 11B in Baltimore County, since 2007. A member of the Democratic Party, he served as the speaker pro tempore of the Maryland House of Delegates from 2024 to 2026, and as the acting speaker of the Maryland House of Delegates in December 2025.

== Early life and education ==
Stein was born in Baltimore and attended public schools in Baltimore County, later graduating from Milford Mill High School. He later attended Harvard College, where he earned a B.A. degree in government, the Woodrow Wilson School of Public and International Affairs at Princeton University, where he earned a Master of Public Affairs degree, and Columbia University School of Law, where he earned a Juris Doctor degree in 1985.

After graduating, Stein worked as an attorney for the Washington, D.C.–based law firm Squire, Sanders & Dempsey until 1992, when he founded Grassroots Recycling, a local recycling group. Later that year, he and eventual Maryland lieutenant governor Kathleen Kennedy Townsend founded Civic Works, a nonprofit organization that supported Baltimore-based urban service projects, including the restoration of the Clifton Mansion.

Stein first became involved in politics in 1994, when he unsuccessfully ran for the Baltimore County Council in District 2, challenging incumbent councilmember Kevin Kamenetz. In 1996, he became the president of the Baltimore County Central Committee. Stein was later the committee's treasurer from 1996 to 2002 and its chair from 2001 to 2002.

== In the legislature ==
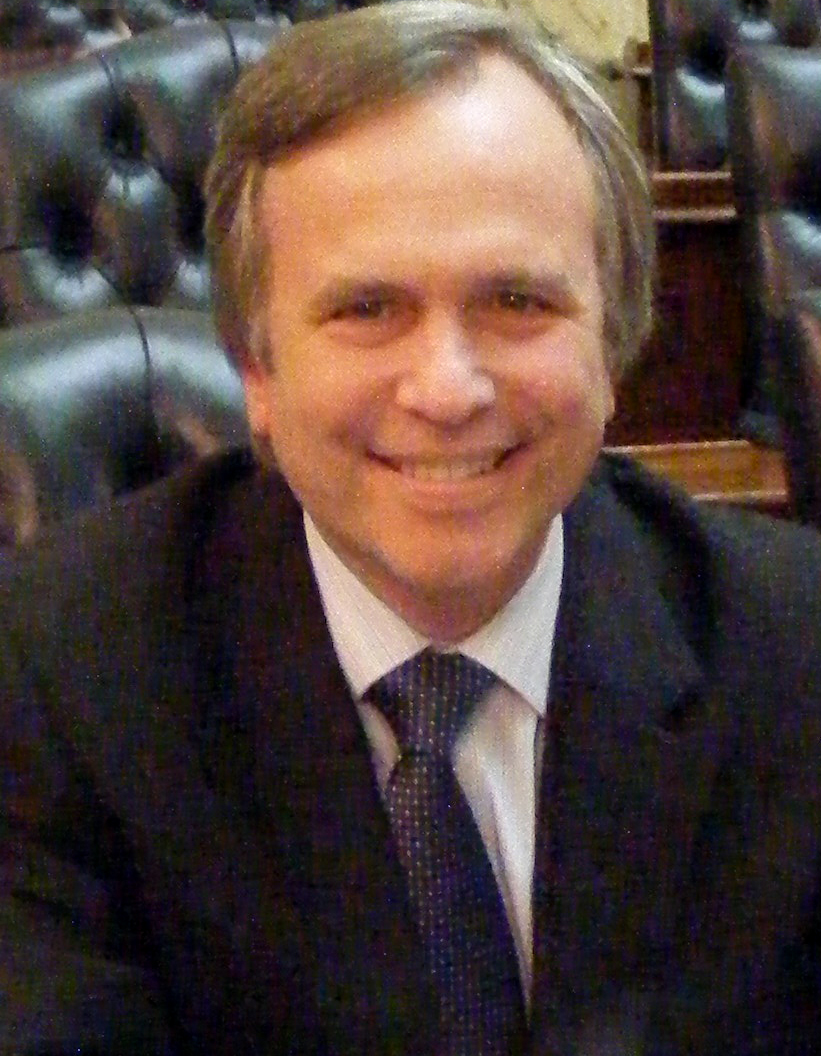
Stein in 2007

In May 2002, following Governor Parris Glendening's appointment of state delegate Michael Finifter to the Baltimore County Circuit Court, he applied to serve the remainder of Finifter's term in the Maryland House of Delegates. The Baltimore County Central Committee voted to nominate Stein in June, and he was appointed by Glendening and sworn in on June 25, 2002. Stein ran for a full term in the 2002 Maryland House of Delegates election, in which he was defeated in the Democratic primary by Jon Cardin.

In 2006, Stein ran for the Maryland House of Delegates, seeking to succeed state delegate Robert Zirkin, who ran for the Maryland Senate. He won the general election on November 8, and was sworn in on January 10, 2007. In 2022, Stein was redrawn into District 11B, in which he ran for re-election.

Stein was the deputy majority whip from 2011 to 2015. In May 2023, the house speaker, Adrienne A. Jones, nominated Stein to be speaker pro tempore of the Maryland House of Delegates, succeeding Sheree Sample-Hughes. In December 2025, Stein became the acting speaker of the Maryland House of Delegates after Jones announced that she would step down the role. He declined to seek his party's nomination for speaker.

=== Committee assignments ===
- Vice-Chair, Environment and Transportation Committee, 2015–present (local government & bi-county agencies subcommittee, 2015–2018; motor vehicle & transportation subcommittee, 2015–2019; chair, natural resources, agriculture & open space subcommittee, 2015–2019, member, 2020–present; chair, environment subcommittee, 2020–present)
- Joint Subcommittee on Program Open Space and Agricultural Land Preservation, 2011–present
- Rules and Executive Nominations Committee, 2015–present
- House Chair, Joint Committee on the Chesapeake and Atlantic Coastal Bays Critical Area, 2015–present
- Joint Committee on Legislative Ethics, 2022–present
- Ways and Means Committee, 2002–2003 (finance resources subcommittee, 2002–2003)
- Environmental Matters Committee, 2007–2015 (ground rent work group, 2007; local government & bi-county subcommittee, 2007–2009; land use & ethics subcommittee, 2007–2010; motor vehicles & transportation subcommittee, 2007–2015; environment subcommittee, 2008–2012; housing & real property subcommittee, 2013–15)

== Political positions ==
=== Agriculture ===
During the 2018 legislative session, Stein introduced legislation to ban the use of chlorpyrifos, a harmful pesticide used on food crops. The bill was watered down to a bill to study banning the pesticide amid concerns over a possible spotted lanternfly invasion. He reintroduced the chlorpyrifos ban in 2020, during which it passed, but was vetoed by Governor Hogan.

During the 2019 legislative session, Stein introduced legislation to prohibit hemp farming in residential areas. The bills were voted down in committee.

=== Environment ===
During the 2011 legislative session, Stein introduced legislation that would enforce the International Green Construction Code on all commercial buildings taller than three stories. The bill passed and was signed into law by Governor Martin O'Malley.

During the 2015 legislative session, after Governor Larry Hogan revoked a Maryland Department of the Environment rule to regulate nitrogen oxide emissions in the state, Stein introduced a bill to codify the regulations into law.

During the 2018 legislative session, Stein introduced a bill to require the Maryland Department of Natural Resources and Department of Transportation to develop a plan to address the impact of sea level rise on state and local projects by July 2019. The bill passed and was signed into law by Governor Hogan. In 2019, he introduced legislation to push back the deadline to October 2020, and required all jurisdictions that regularly flood during high tide to come up with sea level rise plans, which passed and was signed into law by Governor Hogan. During the 2022 legislative session, Stein introduced legislation that would assign "environmental justice scores" to permits issued by the Maryland Department of the Environment.

Also in 2018, Stein introduced legislation that would prohibit Maryland from withdrawing from the Paris Agreement without the legislature's approval.

In 2021, Stein introduced the Climate Solutions Now Act, a sweeping environment reform bill that would increase the state's goal of cutting carbon emissions from a 40 percent reduction from its 2006 levels to a 60 percent cut by 2030. The bill failed to pass after negotiations between the House and Senate broke down in the final weeks of the legislative session. Stein reintroduced the bill during the 2022 legislative session, during which it passed and became law without Governor Hogan's signature.

In September 2022, Stein co-signed a letter to U.S. Energy Secretary Jennifer Granholm in support of a proposal rule that would increase the efficiency level of gas furnaces to 95% Annual Fuel Utilization Efficiency.

In January 2023, Stein testified in support of the Bring Your Own Bag Act in Baltimore County, which would ban grocery stores from using plastic bags.

=== Gun control ===
During the 2021 legislative session, Stein introduced "Jaelynn's Law", which would require guns to be safely stored and inaccessible for children below the age of 18. The bill was named for 16-year-old Jaelynn Willey, who was fatally shot in 2018 by a boy who had his father's Glock.

=== Health care ===
During his 2006 House of Delegates campaign, Stein said he supported universal health care.

=== Immigration ===
During the 2021 legislative session, Stein introduced the Maryland Driver Privacy Act, which would prohibit federal agencies from accessing state databases unless it had a warrant and blocked the state from providing agencies with photos of individuals for immigration investigations. The bill passed, but was vetoed by Governor Larry Hogan. The Maryland General Assembly overrode Hogan's veto during the special legislative session later that year.

=== Social issues ===
As executive director of Civic Works, Stein supported the passage of National and Community Service Trust Act of 1993, which created and provided funding for AmeriCorps.

During his 2006 House of Delegates campaign, Stein said he supported legislation to encourage competition in the energy industry.

During the 2012 legislative session, Stein introduced legislation that would require the Maryland State Police to compile a list of people convicted of animal abuse or neglect.

In 2013, Stein introduced legislation that would require girls lacrosse players to wear protective headgear.

In July 2020, Stein cosigned a letter calling on Governor Larry Hogan to extend the state's COVID-19 pandemic eviction moratorium, which was set to expire at the end of the month, until January 2021.

During the 2021 legislative session, Stein introduced legislation that would ban "faithless electors" by requiring that the state's Electoral College members cast their votes for the candidate who won the majority of the vote.

=== Taxes ===
In 2011, Stein introduced legislation to eliminate the state's tax break for bullion sales.

During the 2017 legislative session, Stein introduced the Taxpayer Protection Act, which gave the Comptroller of Maryland's investigators the ability to enforce income tax fraud cases involving tobacco and motor fuel. The bill passed and was signed into law by Governor Hogan in May 2017.

== Personal life ==
Stein is married to his wife, Margaret Presley-Stein. Together, they have three children and live in Pikesville, Maryland. He is partially of Irish descent.

== Electoral history ==
Maryland House of Delegates District 11 Democratic primary election, 2002
Party	Candidate	Votes	%
Democratic	Robert Zirkin (incumbent)	10,198	22.9
Democratic	Dan K. Morhaim (incumbent)	7,922	17.8
Democratic	Jon Cardin	7,776	17.4
Democratic	Dana Stein (incumbent)	6,576	14.8
Democratic	Melvin Mintz	6,311	14.2
Democratic	Theodore Levin	3,349	7.5
Democratic	Barney J. Wilson	2,438	5.5

Maryland House of Delegates District 11 Democratic primary election, 2006
Party	Candidate	Votes	%
Democratic	Jon Cardin (incumbent)	11,815	22.5
Democratic	Dan K. Morhaim (incumbent)	10,146	19.3
Democratic	Dana Stein	6,824	13.0
Democratic	Rick Yaffe	6,634	12.6
Democratic	Sharon H. Bloom	4,436	8.4
Democratic	Jason A. Frank	3,300	6.3
Democratic	Julian Earl Jones	3,291	6.3
Democratic	Theodore Levin	2,271	4.3
Democratic	Noel Levy	1,075	2.0
Democratic	Stephen Knable	979	1.9
Democratic	Zhanna Anapolsky-Maydanich	672	1.3
Democratic	V. Michael Koyfman	526	1.0

Maryland House of Delegates District 11 election, 2006
Party	Candidate	Votes	%
Democratic	Jon Cardin (incumbent)	32,747	25.8
Democratic	Dan K. Morhaim (incumbent)	31,185	24.6
Democratic	Dana Stein	30,481	24.0
Republican	Patrick Abbondandolo	12,822	10.1
Green	Dave Goldsmith	5,435	4.3
Write-in		181	0.1

Maryland House of Delegates District 11 election, 2010
Party	Candidate	Votes	%
Democratic	Jon Cardin (incumbent)	32,211	24.3
Democratic	Dan K. Morhaim (incumbent)	28,129	21.2
Democratic	Dana Stein (incumbent)	28,034	21.2
Republican	J. Michael Collins	13,971	10.6
Republican	Carol C. Byrd	13,952	10.5
Republican	Steven J. Smith	13,647	10.3
Libertarian	Brandon Brooks	2,341	1.8
Write-in		115	0.1

Maryland House of Delegates District 11 election, 2014
Party	Candidate	Votes	%
Democratic	Shelly L. Hettleman	24,197	27.6
Democratic	Dana M. Stein (incumbent)	23,241	26.5
Democratic	Dan Morhaim (incumbent)	22,991	26.2
Republican	Laura Harkins	16,947	19.3
Write-in		308	0.4

Maryland House of Delegates District 11 election, 2018
Party	Candidate	Votes	%
Democratic	Jon Cardin (incumbent)	33,077	29.3
Democratic	Shelly Hettleman (incumbent)	31,957	28.3
Democratic	Dana Stein (incumbent)	30,364	26.9
Republican	Jonathan Porter	16,852	14.9
Write-in		521	0.5

Maryland House of Delegates District 11B election, 2022
Party	Candidate	Votes	%
Democratic	Jon Cardin (incumbent)	22,115	34.9
Democratic	Dana M. Stein (incumbent)	21,536	34.0
Republican	Jim Simpson	10,640	16.8
Republican	Tyler A. Stiff	9,072	14.3
Write-in		70	0.1

Maryland House of Delegates
Preceded by Sheree Sample-Hughes	Speaker pro tempore of the Maryland House of Delegates; 2024–2026	Succeeded by Luke Clippinger
Political offices
Preceded by Adrienne A. Jones	Speaker of the Maryland House of Delegates; Acting; 2025	Succeeded by Joseline Peña-Melnyk
