= Jon Cardin =

American politician (born 1970)

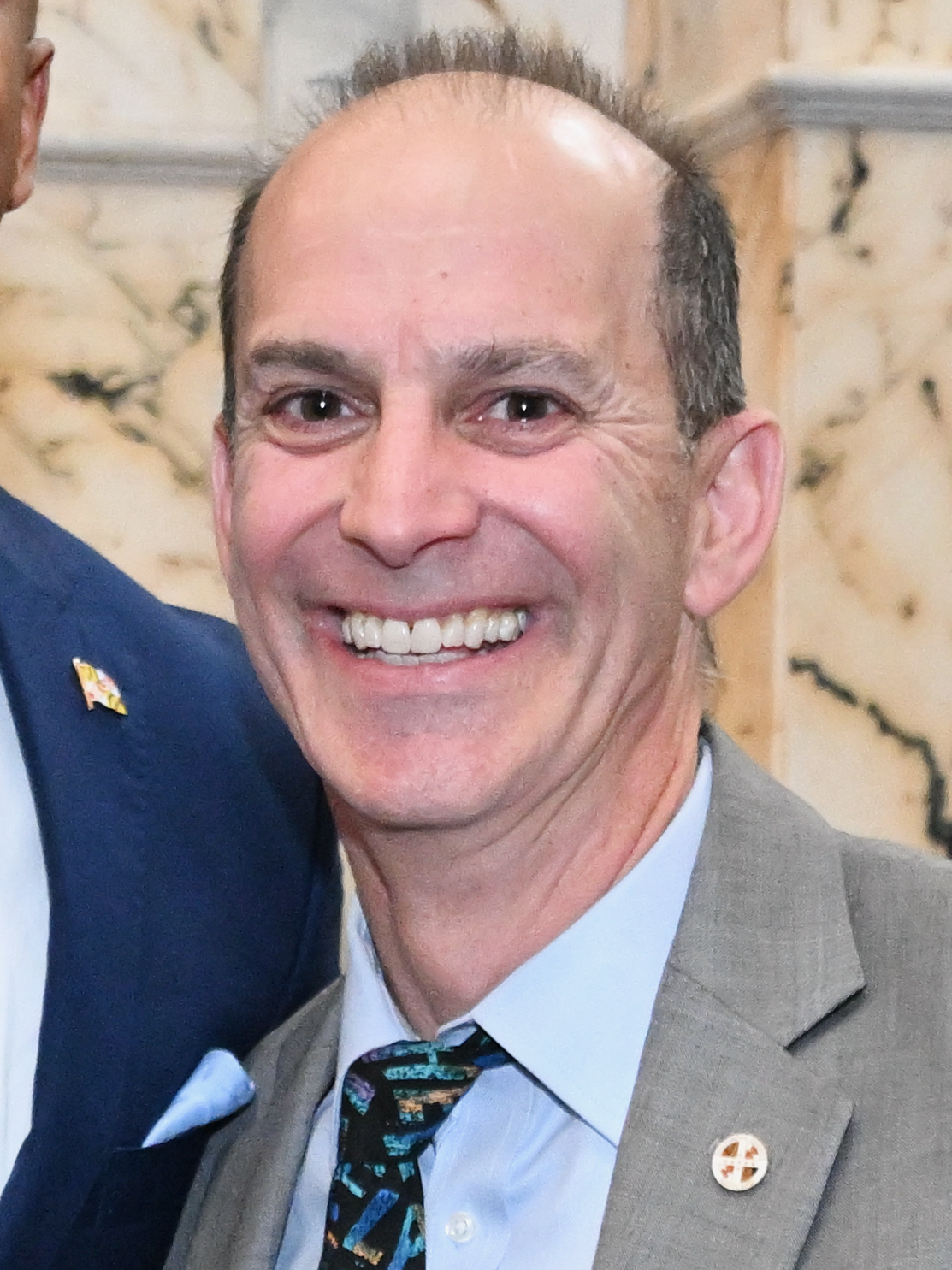
- Cardin in 2024

Member of the Maryland House of Delegates
- Incumbent
- Assumed office January 9, 2019 Serving with Dana Stein
- Preceded by: Dan K. Morhaim
- Constituency: District 11 (2019–2023); District 11B (2023–present)
- In office January 8, 2003 – January 14, 2015
- Preceded by: Dana Stein
- Succeeded by: Shelly L. Hettleman
- Constituency: District 11

Personal details
- Born: Jon Steven Cardin; January 12, 1970 (age 56) Baltimore, Maryland, U.S.
- Party: Democratic
- Spouse: Megan Homer
- Children: 2
- Relatives: Ben Cardin (uncle); Meyer Cardin (grandfather)
- Education: Tufts University (BA); University of Maryland, Baltimore County (MPP); Towson University (MA); University of Maryland, Baltimore (JD)
- Website: Official website

Jon Steven Cardin (born January 12, 1970) is an American politician who has served as a member of the Maryland House of Delegates representing District 11 since 2019, and previously from 2003 to 2015. A member of the Democratic Party, he unsuccessfully ran for Attorney General of Maryland in 2014. Cardin is the nephew of U.S. Senator Ben Cardin.

== Early life and education ==
Cardin was born in Baltimore on January 12, 1970. He graduated from the Park School of Baltimore and attended Tufts University, where he received a Bachelor of Arts degree in international relations in 1992; the University of Maryland, Baltimore County, where he earned a Master of Public Service degree in policy sciences in 1996; Baltimore Hebrew University, where he earned a Master of Arts degree in Judaic studies with honors in 1996; and the University of Maryland, Baltimore, where he earned his Juris Doctor degree with honors in 2001.

== Career ==
After Cardin was admitted to the Maryland Bar in 2001, he clerked for Baltimore City Circuit Court Judge William D. Quarles Jr. until 2002. Afterwards, he started his own law firm, Jon S. Cardin, P.A.

=== Maryland House of Delegates ===
In 2002, Cardin filed to run for the Maryland House of Delegates in District 11, seeking to succeed delegate Michael Finifter, who resigned to serve as a state circuit court judge.

Cardin was first sworn into the Maryland House of Delegates on January 8, 2003, and was a member of the Ways and Means Committee during his entire first stint in office. During the 2014 legislative session, Cardin missed 75 percent of committee votes, which he attributed to him leaving early to recognize Shabbat and to spend time with his daughter and pregnant wife.

In February 2018, Cardin filed to run for the Maryland House of Delegates in District 11, seeking to succeed retiring state delegate Dan K. Morhaim. He won the Democratic primary election on June 26, 2018, placing third with 23.6 percent of the vote. During the general election, Cardin was targeted by the Republican State Leadership Committee, who sent out flyers attacking him for voting for tax increases under the Martin O'Malley administration. He won the general election on November 6, defeating Republican challenger Jonathan Porter with 29.3 percent of the vote.

Cardin was sworn in for his second stint in the legislature on January 9, 2019, during which he has served on the Judiciary Committee.

In December 2019, following the resignation of state senator Robert Zirkin, Cardin said that he would apply to serve the remainder of Zirkin's term in the Maryland Senate. In January 2020, the Baltimore County Democratic Central Committee voted to nominate Shelly Hettleman to fill the vacancy over Cardin.

In August 2024, after Johnny Olszewski won the Democratic nomination in the 2024 U.S. House of Representatives election in Maryland's 2nd congressional district, Cardin expressed interest in serving the remainder of Olszewski's term as Baltimore County Executive. Cardin applied to succeed Olszewski, but withdrew from the race in late November 2024.

=== Baltimore Police marriage proposal incident ===
In August 2009, Cardin was criticized for using Baltimore Police Department resources to perform a marriage proposal prank. Cardin was using a friend's boat when police boarded the boat as a Foxtrot helicopter hovered above the boat. According to the Baltimore Sun, Cardin's girlfriend thought she was going to be arrested when Cardin proposed to her. After the issue became public, Delegate Cardin promised to reimburse the City of Baltimore for the costs incurred. Cardin paid $300 to the Baltimore Police Department to cover the costs and donated $1,000 to the city's mounted unit. The Baltimore Police Department launched an internal affairs investigation into the marriage proposal incident. In November 2009, a police sergeant was charged with misconduct in connection with the prank.

=== 2014 Maryland Attorney General campaign ===
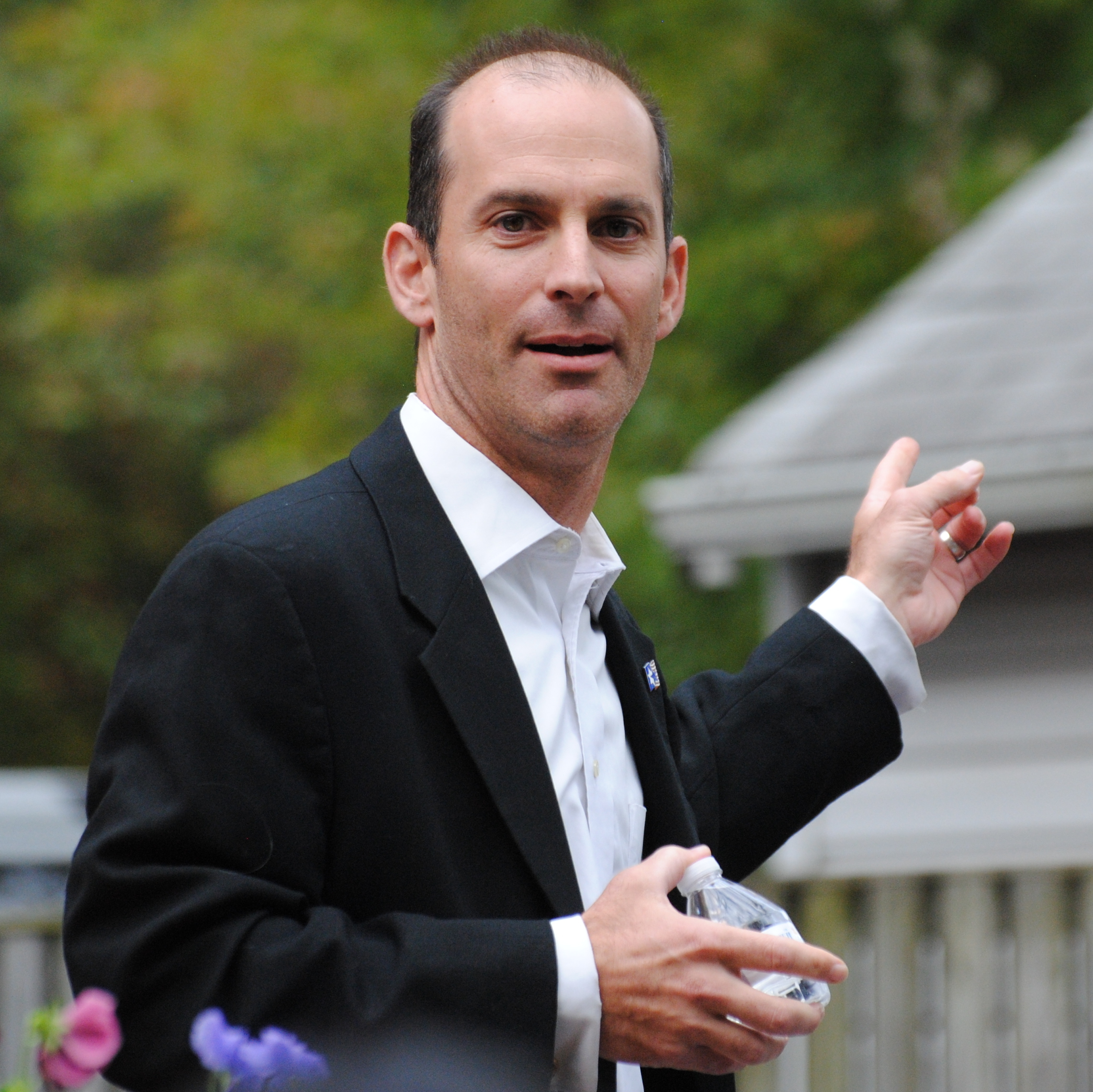
Cardin campaigning in 2013

In November 2012, Cardin formed an exploratory committee into a potential run for attorney general of Maryland in 2014. He officially announced his candidacy on July 22, 2013, becoming the first candidate to enter the race. Cardin ran on a platform that involved focusing on cyber fraud, identity theft, and public safety.

During the Democratic primary, Cardin was criticized for benefiting from political nepotism after campaigning with his uncle Ben Cardin, for misusing Baltimore Police Department resources in a stunt wedding proposal, missing 75 percent of committee votes during the 2014 legislative session, and touting an endorsement from Ski Money, a Baltimore-based rapper who had been indicted on human trafficking charges in Baltimore County. Following the Democratic primary election, he called these criticisms "the most negative smear campaign in a Democratic Party primary in Maryland's modern history".

In June 2014, Cardin filed a report with the Maryland State Board of Elections against state senator Lisa Gladden and state delegate Maggie McIntosh, both supporters of Brian Frosh, accusing the lawmakers of "verbally harassing" one of his campaign volunteers. Both legislators denied Cardin's accusations, with McIntosh saying that she had not confronted any Cardin supports while canvassing and Gladden saying that she was never at the polling place described in the report.

Polling ahead of the primary election showed Cardin leading other Democratic challengers Frosh and Aisha Braveboy, but with a majority of voters saying that they were undecided. He was defeated in the Democratic primary by state senator Brian Frosh on June 24, 2014, and conceded to Frosh the day after the election. Following his defeat, Cardin worked as a lobbyist.

== Political positions ==
=== Crime and policing ===
During the 2013 legislative session, Cardin voted to repeal the death penalty in Maryland. He also introduced a bill that would fine speed camera vendors who issue erroneous tickets.

In 2014, Cardin introduced a bill that would make revenge porn punishable by a five-year jail term and a $25,000 fine.

During the 2022 legislative session, Cardin introduced legislation to expand the state's Good Samaritan law to protect people suffering from an overdose from arrest or prosecution.

=== Education ===
During the 2007 legislative session, Cardin introduced a bill requiring elementary schools to have 150 minutes of physical education classes a week. The bill received an unfavorable report in the House Ways and Means Committee.

=== Electoral reform ===
During the 2011 legislative session, Cardin introduced a bill that would allow campaign contributions to Maryland political candidates by text message. The bill passed and became law.

In 2021, Cardin introduced a bill that would require the state to send mail-in ballots to all registered voters. He also introduced a bill that would amend the Constitution of Maryland to appointed state judges serve 12-year terms before running in a retention election.

=== Gun policy ===
During the 2013 legislative session, Cardin introduced legislation that would levy taxes on bullet sales and impose a $25 gun registration fee, with revenues earned from the excises going toward mental health services in the state. He also introduced bills to ban assault weapons, and another requiring background checks for weapon sales.

=== Health care ===
During the 2005 legislative session, Cardin voted to override Governor Bob Ehrlich's veto on a bill limiting increases on malpractice insurance premiums and to levy a premium tax on health maintenance organizations.

=== Marijuana ===
During a committee hearing on legislation creating a statewide referendum on legalizing recreational cannabis in 2022, Cardin expressed concerns about the health impacts of long-term cannabis use and with drivers using cannabis while driving, but nevertheless voted to pass the referendum bill.

=== Social issues ===
During the 2012 legislative session, Cardin voted for the Civil Marriage Protection Act, a bill to legalize same-sex marriage in Maryland. In 2014, he introduced a bill to ban conversion therapy for LGBT teens.

In 2013, Cardin introduced Grace's Law, which would make harassing a child with the intent of encouraging them to commit suicide punishable by a fine and jail time. The bill was named for Grace McComas, a 15-year-old who took their own life in 2012 following online taunts and hate speech. The bill passed and was signed into law by Governor Martin O'Malley. In 2019, he introduced legislation to increase the penalties under Grace's Law to up to 10 years in prison. The bill passed and was signed into law by Governor Larry Hogan.

=== Taxes ===
During the 2013 legislative session, Cardin voted for a bill to index the state's fuel taxes to inflation to pay for state transportation projects.

== Personal life ==
Cardin is married to his wife, Megan (née Homer). Together, they have two children and live in Owings Mills, Maryland.

== Electoral history ==
Maryland House of Delegates District 11 Democratic primary election, 2002
Party	Candidate	Votes	%
Democratic	Robert Zirkin (incumbent)	10,198	22.9
Democratic	Dan K. Morhaim (incumbent)	7,922	17.8
Democratic	Jon S. Cardin	7,776	17.4
Democratic	Dana Stein (incumbent)	6,576	14.8
Democratic	Melvin Mintz	6,311	14.2
Democratic	Theodore Levin	3,349	7.5
Democratic	Barney J. Wilson	2,438	5.5

Maryland House of Delegates District 11 election, 2002
Party	Candidate	Votes	%
Democratic	Robert Zirkin (incumbent)	30,467	23.5
Democratic	Jon S. Cardin	29,480	22.7
Democratic	Dan K. Morhaim (incumbent)	28,098	21.7
Republican	J. Michael Collins Sr.	14,601	11.3
Republican	Betty L. Wagner	13,483	10.4
Republican	Grant Harding	13,411	10.3
Write-in		130	0.1

Maryland House of Delegates District 11 election, 2006
Party	Candidate	Votes	%
Democratic	Jon S. Cardin (incumbent)	32,747	25.8
Democratic	Dan K. Morhaim (incumbent)	31,185	24.6
Democratic	Dana Stein	30,481	24.0
Republican	Patrick Abbondandolo	12,822	10.1
Green	Dave Goldsmith	5,435	4.3
Write-in		181	0.1

Maryland House of Delegates District 11 election, 2010
Party	Candidate	Votes	%
Democratic	Jon Cardin (incumbent)	32,211	24.3
Democratic	Dan K. Morhaim (incumbent)	28,129	21.2
Democratic	Dana Stein (incumbent)	28,034	21.2
Republican	J. Michael Collins	13,971	10.6
Republican	Carol C. Byrd	13,952	10.5
Republican	Steven J. Smith	13,647	10.3
Libertarian	Brandon Brooks	2,341	1.8
Write-in		115	0.1

Maryland Attorney General Democratic primary election, 2014
Party	Candidate	Votes	%
Democratic	Brian Frosh	228,360	49.6
Democratic	Jon S. Cardin	139,582	30.3
Democratic	Aisha Braveboy	92,664	20.1

Maryland House of Delegates District 11 Democratic primary election, 2018
Party	Candidate	Votes	%
Democratic	Shelly Hettleman (incumbent)	11,158	26.8
Democratic	Dana Stein	9,893	23.7
Democratic	Jon S. Cardin	9,830	23.6
Democratic	Amy Blank	6,252	15.0
Democratic	Linda Dorsey-Walker	3,325	8.0
Democratic	Kate Skovron	1,200	2.9

Maryland House of Delegates District 11 election, 2018
Party	Candidate	Votes	%
Democratic	Jon S. Cardin (incumbent)	33,077	29.3
Democratic	Shelly Hettleman (incumbent)	31,957	28.3
Democratic	Dana Stein (incumbent)	30,364	26.9
Republican	Jonathan Porter	16,852	14.9
Write-in		521	0.5

Maryland House of Delegates District 11B election, 2022
Party	Candidate	Votes	%
Democratic	Jon S. Cardin (incumbent)	22,115	34.9
Democratic	Dana M. Stein (incumbent)	21,536	34.0
Republican	Jim Simpson	10,640	16.8
Republican	Tyler A. Stiff	9,072	14.3
Write-in		70	0.1
