= Maryland Legislative District 11 =

American legislative district

Maryland's legislative district 11
- Represents part of Baltimore County
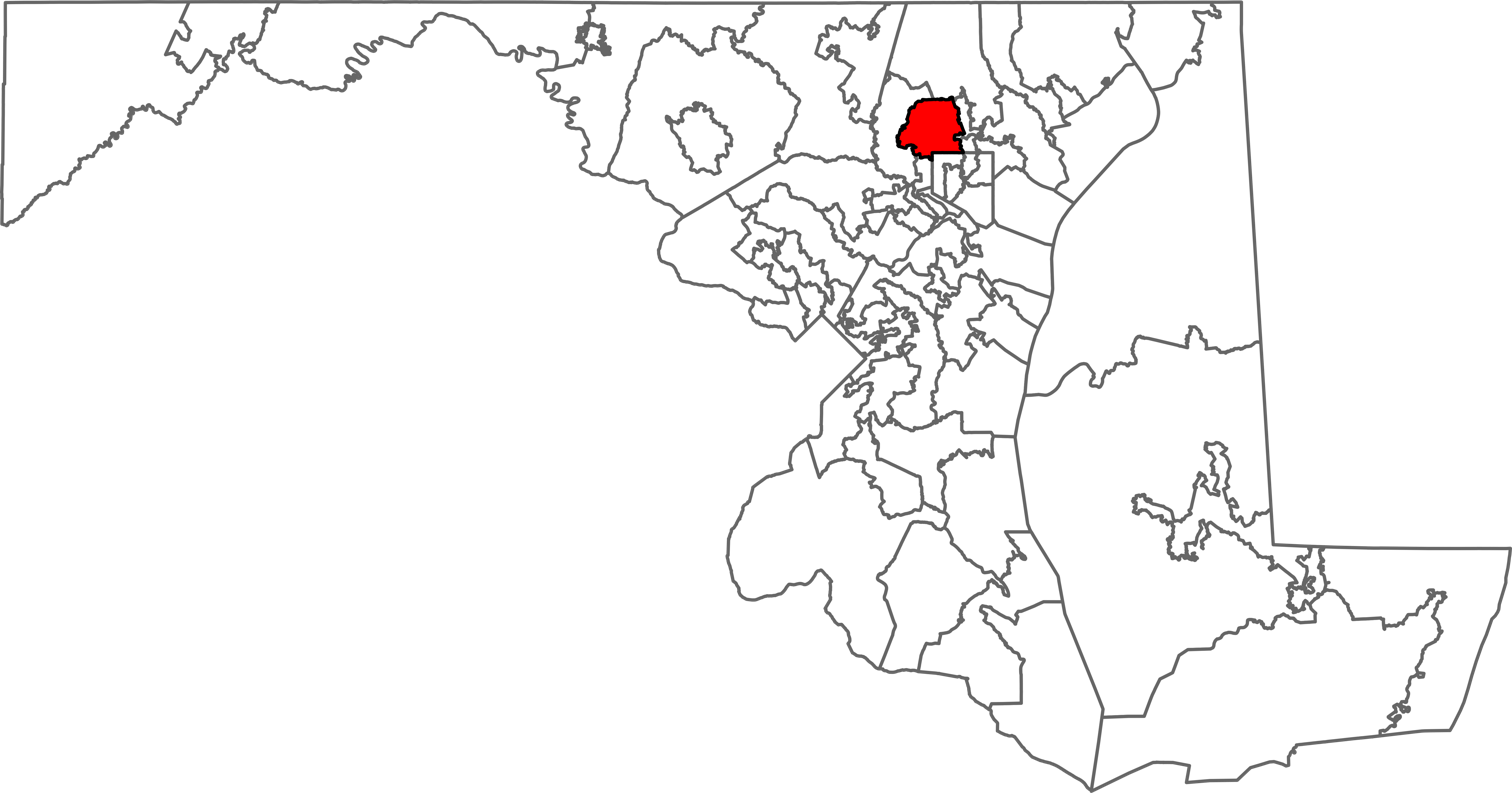
- Senator: Shelly L. Hettleman (D)
- Delegate(s): Cheryl Pasteur (D) (District 11A); Dana M. Stein (D) (District 11B); Jon S. Cardin (D) (District 11B)
- Registration: 60.6% Democratic; 21.1% Republican; 16.9% unaffiliated
- Demographics: 54.0% White; 28.7% Black/African American; 0.3% Native American; 7.4% Asian; 0.0% Hawaiian/Pacific Islander; 3.9% Other race; 5.7% Two or more races; 7.3% Hispanic
- Population (2020): 127,808
- Voting-age population: 99,934
- Registered voters: 86,284

Maryland Legislative District 11 is one of 47 districts in the state for the Maryland General Assembly. It covers part of Baltimore County.

== Demographic characteristics ==
As of the 2020 United States census, the district had a population of 127,808, of whom 99,934 (78.2%) were of voting age. The racial makeup of the district was 68,981 (54.0%) White, 36,640 (28.7%) African American, 416 (0.3%) Native American, 9,434 (7.4%) Asian, 22 (0.0%) Pacific Islander, 5,042 (3.9%) from some other race, and 7,242 (5.7%) from two or more races. Hispanic or Latino of any race were 9,335 (7.3%) of the population.

The district had 86,284 registered voters as of October 17, 2020, of whom 14,542 (16.9%) were registered as unaffiliated, 18,171 (21.1%) were registered as Republicans, 52,312 (60.6%) were registered as Democrats, and 805 (0.9%) were registered to other parties.

== Political representation ==
The district is represented for the 2023–2027 legislative term in the State Senate by Shelly L. Hettleman (D) and in the House of Delegates by Cheryl Pasteur (D, District 11A), Jon S. Cardin (D, District 11B) and Dana M. Stein (D, District 11B).

== Election history ==
=== Multi-member Senate district (1967–1975) ===
Years	Senator	Party	Electoral history	Years	Senator	Party	Electoral history
January 2, 1963 – December 17, 1968	Paul Dorf	Democratic	Redistricted from Baltimore City's 5th district and re-elected in 1966. Retired to run for judge of the Supreme Bench of Baltimore City.	January 18, 1967 – January 8, 1975	Carl L. Friedler	Democratic	Elected in 1966. Retired to run for U.S. representative in Maryland's 7th congressional district.
December 19, 1968 – December 17, 1968	Edward Azrael	Democratic	Appointed to finish Dorf's term. Lost renomination.	January 18, 1967 – January 8, 1975	Carl L. Friedler	Democratic	Elected in 1966. Retired to run for U.S. representative in Maryland's 7th congressional district.
January 13, 1971 – January 8, 1975	Rosalie Silber Abrams	Democratic	Elected in 1970. Redistricted to the 42nd district.	January 13, 1971 – January 8, 1975	Clarence W. Blount	Democratic	Elected in 1970. Redistricted to the 41st district.

=== Single-member Senate district (1975–present) ===
Years	Senator	Party	Electoral history
January 8, 1975 – January 12, 1983	Robert E. Stroble	Republican	Elected in 1974. Re-elected in 1978. Retired.
January 12, 1983 – January 14, 1987	Melvin Steinberg	Democratic	Redistricted from the 12th district and re-elected in 1982. Retired to run for lieutenant governor of Maryland.
January 14, 1987 – January 10, 2007	Paula Hollinger	Democratic	Elected in 1986. Re-elected in 1990. Re-elected in 1994. Re-elected in 1998. Re-elected in 2002. Retired to run for U.S. representative in Maryland's 3rd congressional district.
January 10, 2007 – January 1, 2020	Robert Zirkin	Democratic	Elected in 2006. Re-elected in 2010. Re-elected in 2014. Re-elected in 2018. Resigned.
February 3, 2020 – present	Shelly L. Hettleman	Democratic	Appointed to finish Zirkin's term. Elected in 2022. Re-elected in 2026.
