= Cheryl Pasteur =

American politician

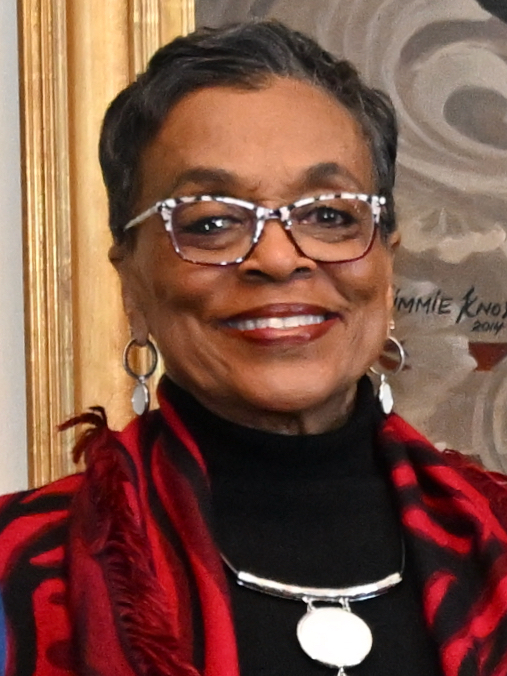
- Pasteur in 2024

Member of the Maryland House of Delegates from the 11A district
- Incumbent
- Assumed office January 11, 2023
- Preceded by: Lisa Belcastro

Personal details
- Born: 1948 or 1949 (age 77–78)
- Party: Democratic
- Education: University of Maryland, College Park (BA); Morgan State University (MS)
- Profession: Teacher
- Website: Campaign website

Cheryl E. Pasteur (born 1948/1949) is an American politician. She is a member of the Maryland House of Delegates for District 11A in Baltimore County. She previously served on the Baltimore County Board of Education from 2018 to 2022.

== Education and career ==
Pasteur graduated from the University of Maryland, College Park with a Bachelor of Arts degree in English education in 1971. She later attended Morgan State University, where she earned a Master of Science in urban education in 1975.

Pasteur is a former teacher at Lake Clifton Eastern High School and Old Court Middle School as well as a former principal for Old Court Middle School and Randallstown High School. From 1983 to 1988, she worked for the Federal Bureau of Investigation. Pasteur retired from teaching in 2012.

== Involvement in politics ==
In November 2018, Pasteur was elected to the Baltimore County School Board in Councilmanic District 2, receiving 66.1 percent of the vote in the general election. In December 2019, Pasteur challenged incumbent board chair Kathleen Causey in the election for chair of the Baltimore County School Board. Pasteur received six votes for the chair position, while Causey received five. Despite this, Causey continued to serve as the board's chair, as board policy requires a candidate to receive seven votes to become chair. In December 2021, the school board selected Pasteur to serve as its vice chair.

In June 2019, Maryland Senate President Thomas V. Miller Jr. and House Speaker Adrienne A. Jones named Pasteur to serve on the Blueprint for Maryland's Future Funding Formula Workgroup. In January 2020, the Baltimore County School Board voted to endorse the recommendations of the Kirwan Commission.

In February 2022, Pasteur filed a declaration supporting a lawsuit challenging Baltimore County's new council districts for diluting the power of Black voters.

Pasteur resigned from the school board on February 11, 2022, to run for the Maryland House of Delegates in District 11A. In June 2022, Governor Larry Hogan appointed retired middle school teacher Felicia Stolusky to serve the rest of her term. Pasteur was the only candidate to run for the district.

=== In the legislature ===
Pasteur was sworn into the Maryland House of Delegates on January 11, 2023. She is a member of the House Judiciary Committee. In November 2026, House Speaker Joseline Peña-Melnyk named Pasteur as the deputy speaker pro tempore.

== Controversy ==
In 2012, the Maryland State Department of Education opened an investigation into Randallstown High School, where Pasteur was a principal at the time of the investigation, after two anonymous sources reported cheating on state testing. A confidential report obtained by Project Baltimore in May 2020 found "improbable gains" on the state assessments of sixteen students at the school, resulting in two school employees being banned from future state assessments. Pasteur says in the report that she was "unaware of any testing improprieties", but two witnesses told state investigators that she was aware of the cheating. Pasteur announced her retirement weeks after Randallstown High School was reported for allegedly cheating on state testing, and she officially left the school weeks before the results of the investigation were released. Pasteur responded to the Project Baltimore report in a radio interview in June 2020, confirming some of the reported details but denying that she was connected to the alleged cheating or that she retired to "slip out" of the investigation.

== Electoral history ==
Baltimore County School Board District 2 Election, 2018
Candidate	Votes	%
Cheryl E. Pasteur	23,584	66.1
Anthony Miles Glasser	11,770	33.0
Write-in	306	0.9

2022 Maryland House of Delegates District 11A Democratic primary results
Party	Candidate	Votes	%
Democratic	Cheryl E. Pasteur	4,556	100.0

Maryland House of Delegates District 11A election, 2022
Party	Candidate	Votes	%
Democratic	Cheryl E. Pasteur	10,290	98.34%
Write-in		174	1.66%
