= Dan K. Morhaim =

American politician and physician

Dan Koenig Morhaim
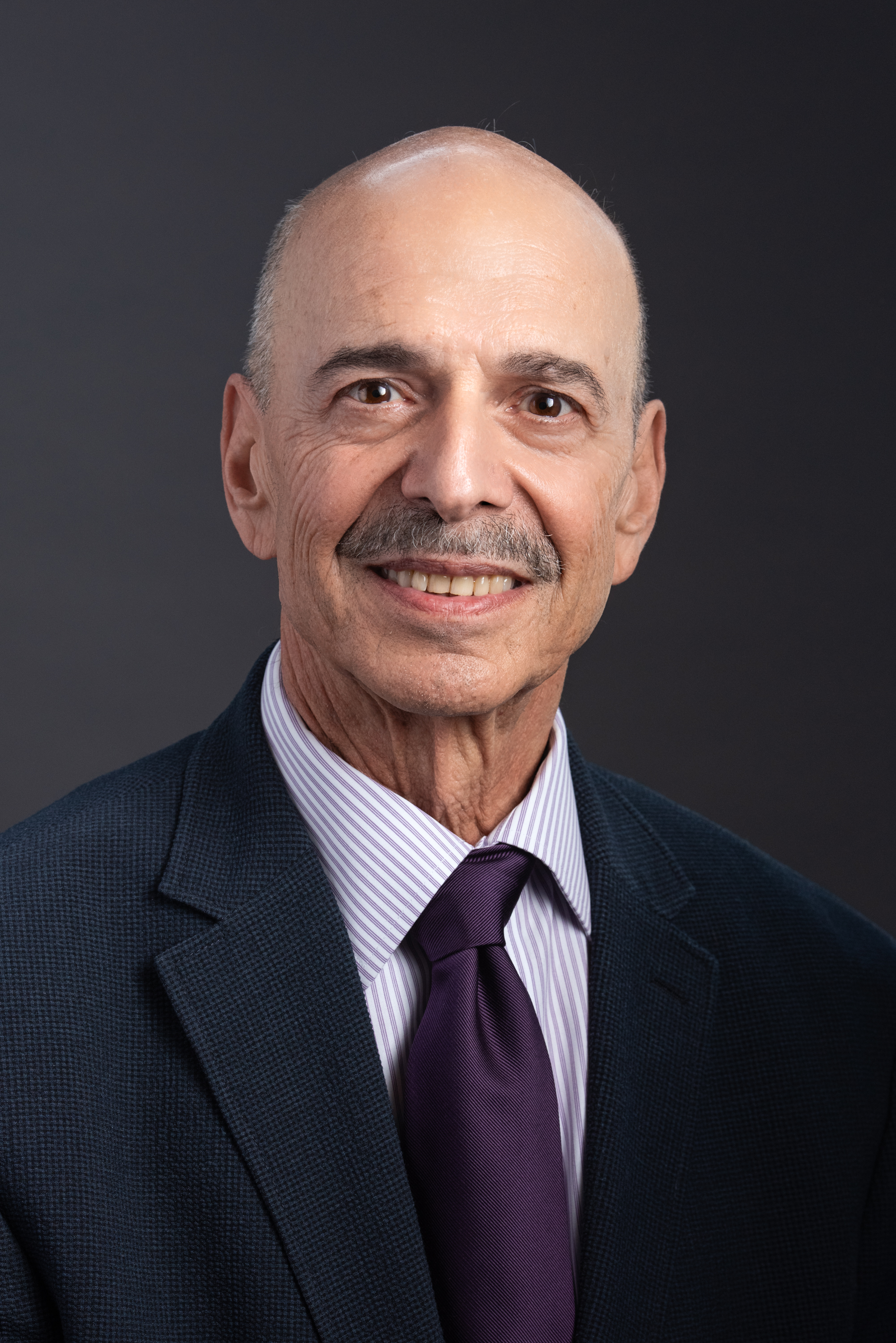
- Morhaim in 2024

Member of the Maryland House of Delegates from the 11th district
- In office January 11, 1995 – January 9, 2019
- Preceded by: New district
- Succeeded by: Jon S. Cardin
- Constituency: Northwest Baltimore County

Personal details
- Born: December 27, 1948 (age 77) Los Angeles, California, U.S.
- Party: Democratic
- Spouse: Shelley Cole Morhaim
- Profession: Politician, physician, author

Dan Koenig Morhaim (born on December 27, 1948) is an American politician, physician, and author. He was a member of the Maryland House of Delegates representing northwest Baltimore County from 1995 to 2019. He sponsored legislation concerning healthcare, the environment, and streamlining government operations. As an author, Morhaim has written articles for medical publications and the general media at large.

== Background ==
Born in Los Angeles, California, United States, in December 1948, Morhaim graduated from Fairfax High School in Los Angeles and earned a Bachelor of Arts in history from the University of California, Berkeley in 1970. Morhaim received his Doctor of Medicine from New York Medical College in 1975 and is board certified in internal and emergency medicine.

== Career ==
Morhaim was first elected to the Maryland House of Delegates in 1994 and was re-elected in 1998, 2002, 2006, 2010, and 2014. In 2018, Morhaim announced, after 24 years of service in the Maryland General Assembly, that he would not seek re-election.

In the legislature, Morhaim served on committees including the Environmental Matters Committee (1995–2003), the Health and Government Operations Committee (2003–17), the Judiciary Committee (2017-19), Joint Committee on Administrative, Executive, and Legislative Review (2003–19), the Joint Committee on Health Care Delivery and Financing (2007–14), the Joint Information Technology and Biotechnology Committee (2009–14), the Joint Committee on Transparency and Open Government (2011–14), the Joint Committee on Cybersecurity, Information Technology, and Biotechnology (2014–19), the Joint Committee on Legislative Information Technology and Open Government (2015–19), and the Joint Committee on Behavioral Health and Opioid Use Disorders (2015–19). Morhaim sponsored numerous bills focusing on health care, the environment, and procurement reform.

In 2017, the House reprimanded Morhaim for paid consulting work performed for a company seeking a medical cannabis license. This was part of a broader push for ethical oversight after multiple corruption scandals, including the second indictment of Nathaniel Oaks, had surfaced in the state's legislature.

In 2019, he was selected as Chair of the Baltimore County Behavioral Healthcare Council, which helps people with substance abuse and/or mental health problems.

He is on the faculty at the George Washington University School of Medicine.

He was appointed to the Maryland Behavioral Healthcare Council in 2023, and then reappointed by Governor Wes Moore for a 4-year term starting in 2024.

Morhaim was selected to serve on the Maryland ER Wait Time Commission in 2024 for a 3-year term. He was appointed to the Maryland Parole Commission in April 2025.

Morhaim is board-certified in Internal Medicine and Emergency Medicine, and has over 40 years of front-line clinical experience. From 1981 to 1994, he chaired the Department of Emergency Medicine at Franklin Square Hospital (Baltimore) while building a 90-doctor, 120-employee group at six Maryland hospitals. He is on staff at Sinai and Northwest Hospitals, part of the Lifebridge Health System. Other clinical experiences include the State of Maryland's medical mission to Kuwait following the first Gulf War, the Indian Health Service (Navajo area), Health Care for the Homeless (Baltimore), medical director for local ambulance companies, and medical director for the 1993 Major League Baseball All-Star Game at Oriole Park. Morhaim is a volunteer physician with Remote Area Medical. Morhaim is a member of the Maryland State Medical Association and serves on its legislative committee.

Morhaim was on the faculty at Johns Hopkins Bloomberg School of Public Health for 16 years, where he taught graduate students, did public health research, and wrote articles for both peer-reviewed and general media publications.

Morhaim has served on the boards of several organizations, including the University of Maryland Biotechnology Institute (UMBI), Western Indemnity Insurance Company, Maritime Medical Systems, Brick Mental Health Foundation, Unified Community Connections (formerly United Cerebral Palsy), Baltimore Humane Society, Health Care for the Homeless, the State's Task Force on Recycling, Region III medical director for the State Emergency Medical System, and on the Executive Committees at Franklin Square and Sinai Hospital.

He served as co-chair of the Alliance for Patient Access, a bipartisan national organization of physicians elected to state office, and as co-chair of the Innovations in Health Care Task Force for the National Conference of State Legislators (NCSL).

He has been recognized for his medical, academic, and legislative work by numerous organizations, including receiving the AMA's Dr. Nathan Davis Award for Public Service in 2011 and awards from Maryland nurses, physicians, architects, retailers, minority business groups, and others.

Morhaim has written two books with his wife Shelley, including “Preparing for a Better End” (Johns Hopkins Press, 2020). These books have earned endorsements from Maya Angelou, US Senator Ben Cardin, US Senator Chris Van Hollen and Benjamin Carson.

=== Legislative notes ===
A list of key votes (Note: Vote Smart used the following criteria to select key votes: Portrays how the delegate stands on an issue; Easy to understand; Received media attention; The vote was passed or defeated by a very close margin; Vote Smart received repeated inquiries about a particular vote) on legislation introduced by Morhaim as the primary or co-sponsor:

- 2018:HB 115: Prescription medications listed on state's Health Information Exchange.
- 2017: HB 81: Removes archaic sexist term “confinement” from estate law.
- 2015: HB 216: Clean water: Microbead pollutant phase out and became national model.
- 2011: HB 456: Minority-Women Business Enterprise program extension.
- 2008:HB 906: Organ donation program revised and made operational
- 2004: HB 556: Health Care Decisions, preferences, communication.

== Selected bibliography ==
- Dan Morhaim, M. D.; Morhaim, Shelley (2020). Preparing for a Better End. Johns Hopkins University Press. ISBN 978-1-4214-3916-7.
- Morhaim, Dan (2012). The better end: surviving (and dying) on your own terms in today's modern medical world. Baltimore, Md: Johns Hopkins University Press. p. 160. ISBN 978-1421404189.

== Personal life ==
Morhaim is married to Shelley Cole Morhaim (writer, film producer, former Chair and current member of the Maryland State Arts Council, and President of the Pikesville ArmoryFoundation). They have 3 adult children and 4 grandchildren.
