= Karen Simpson (politician) =

American politician (born 1967)

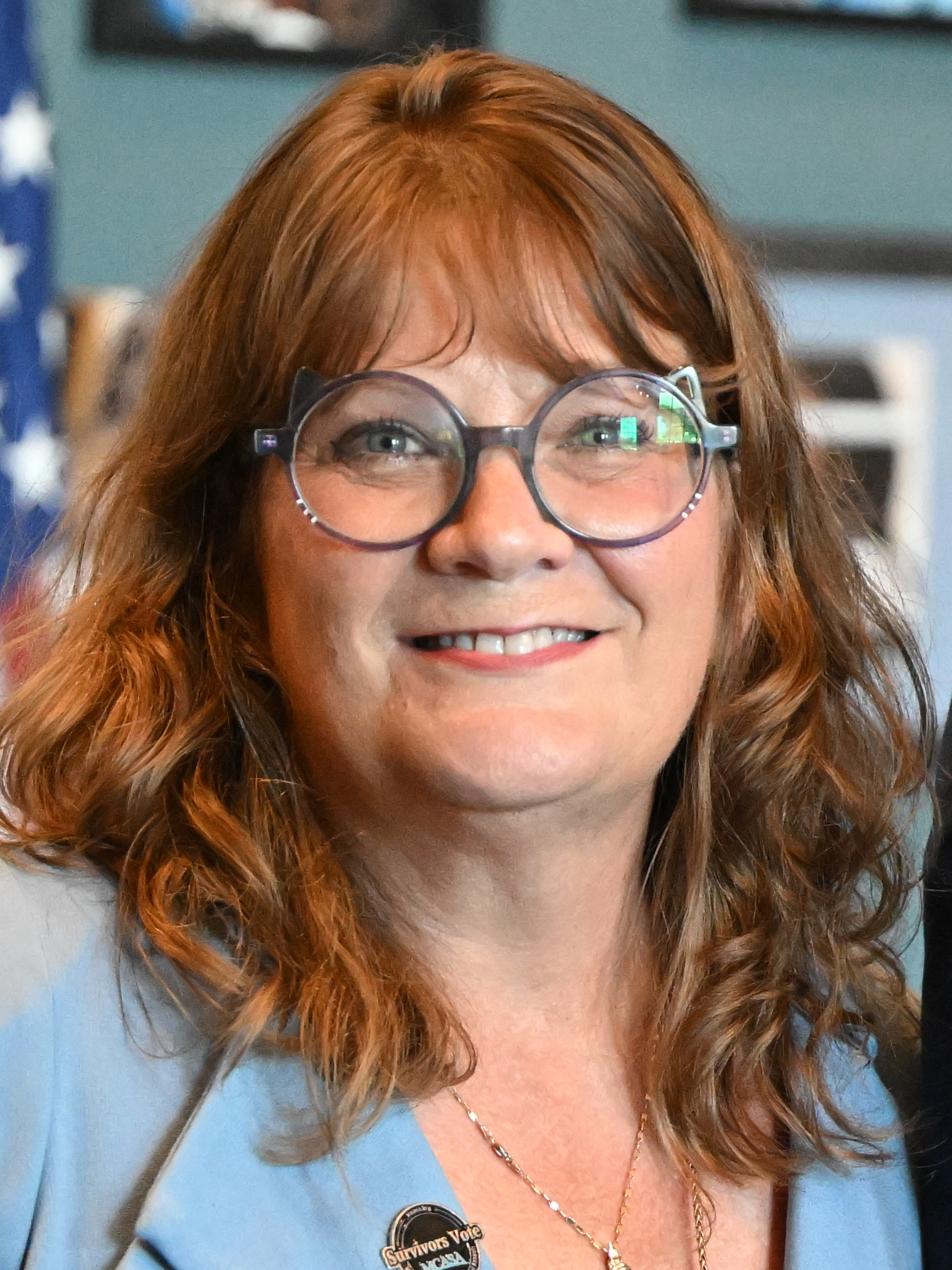
- Simpson in 2026

Member of the Maryland House of Delegates from the 3rd district
- Incumbent
- Assumed office January 11, 2023 Serving with Ken Kerr and Kris Fair
- Preceded by: Carol L. Krimm

Personal details
- Born: August 28, 1967 (age 58) Baltimore, Maryland, U.S.
- Party: Democratic
- Children: 2
- Education: Radford University (BA); Towson University (MA)
- Website: Campaign website

Karen Patricia Simpson (born August 28, 1967) is an American politician who is a member of the Maryland House of Delegates for District 3 in Frederick County, Maryland.

== Background ==
Simpson graduated from Paint Branch High School in 1985. She later attended Radford University, where she earned a Bachelor of Arts degree in psychology in 1989, and Towson University, where she earned a Master of Arts degree in community counseling in 1996.

Simpson first ran for the Maryland House of Delegates in District 31B in 2018. She was defeated in the general election by Republicans Brian Chisholm and state delegate Nic Kipke. She moved to Frederick, Maryland after her husband got a job as a pastor there.

== In the legislature ==
Simpson was sworn into the Maryland House of Delegates on January 11, 2023. She is a member of the House Judiciary Committee.

== Political positions ==
In May 2022, Simpson signed a Chesapeake Climate Action Network resolution to move Maryland to 100 percent carbon-free electricity by 2035 and to remove trash incineration from the state's "clean energy" classification.

In a September 2022 interview with The Frederick News-Post, Simpson said she would support strengthening protections for domestic violence victims, including removing the statute of limitations on reporting workplace sexual harassment and creating a state registry for people convicted of domestic violence-related offenses.

== Personal life ==
Simpson is married to her husband, who is a Lutheran pastor. They have two children. She has survived domestic violence by her first husband. She attends religious services at the Trinity Evangelical Lutheran Church in Boonsboro, Maryland.

== Electoral history ==
Maryland House of Delegates District 31B Democratic primary election, 2018
Party	Candidate	Votes	%
Democratic	Karen Patricia Simpson	3,184	52.4
Democratic	Harry E. Freeman	2,894	47.6

Maryland House of Delegates District 31B election, 2018
Party	Candidate	Votes	%
Republican	Brian Chisholm	20,573	33.2
Republican	Nic Kipke (incumbent)	20,434	33.0
Democratic	Karen Patricia Simpson	11,257	18.2
Democratic	Harry E. Freeman	9,602	15.5
Write-in		49	0.1

Maryland House of Delegates District 3 Democratic Primary Election, 2022
Party	Candidate	Votes	%
Democratic	Kenneth P. Kerr	5,628	19.8
Democratic	Kris Fair	5,598	19.7
Democratic	Karen Simpson	4,450	15.6
Democratic	Josh Bokee	3,618	12.7
Democratic	Tarolyn C. Thrasher	3,489	12.3
Democratic	William "Billy" Reid	3,295	11.6
Democratic	Stephen Slater	2,364	8.3

Maryland House of Delegates District 3 election, 2022
Party	Candidate	Votes	%
Democratic	Kenneth P. Kerr	26,270	24.91
Democratic	Karen Simpson	25,945	24.60
Democratic	Kris Fair	25,602	24.27
Republican	Kathy Diener	13,699	12.99
Republican	Justin Wages	13,535	12.83
Write-in		429	0.41
