= Kris Fair =

American politician (born 1984)

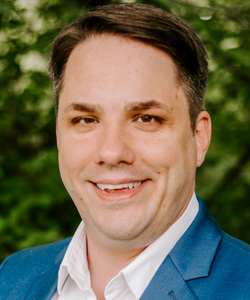

Member of the Maryland House of Delegates from the 3rd district
- Incumbent
- Assumed office January 11, 2023 Serving with Ken Kerr and Karen Simpson
- Preceded by: Karen Lewis Young

Personal details
- Born: Kristopher G. Fair; August 19, 1984 (age 42) Mount Airy, Maryland, U.S.
- Party: Democratic
- Spouse: Dominick Francis Barretta
- Education: Frederick Community College (AA); Hood College (BA)
- Website: Campaign website

Kristopher Goddard Fair (born August 19, 1984) is an American politician who is a member for the Maryland House of Delegates in District 3 in Frederick County, Maryland.

== Background ==
Fair grew up in Mount Airy, Maryland, and graduated from Linganore High School in 2002. He later attended Frederick Community College, where he received an associate's degree in general studies in 2008, and Hood College, where he earned a Bachelor of Arts degree in political science and history in 2013. Fair was the manager of New York, New York Salon in Frederick for 17 years until he left in 2021. Fair was also the chair of the Student Homelessness Initiative Partnership in 2021.

Fair first got involved with politics in 2012, serving as a Frederick County campaign coordinator for Question 6. He later served as the vice-chair of the Frederick County Democratic Central Committee, and as the Frederick County Democratic Party campaign manager in 2014. In January 2017, Fair announced that he would run for the Frederick City Board of Aldermen. His candidacy was backed by county executive Jan Gardner, state senator Ron Young, and various county council members and city aldermen. His platform included improving the city's infrastructure, providing equitable services, and supporting a responsive government. He came in sixth place in the nonpartisan primary, receiving 10.2 percent of the vote.

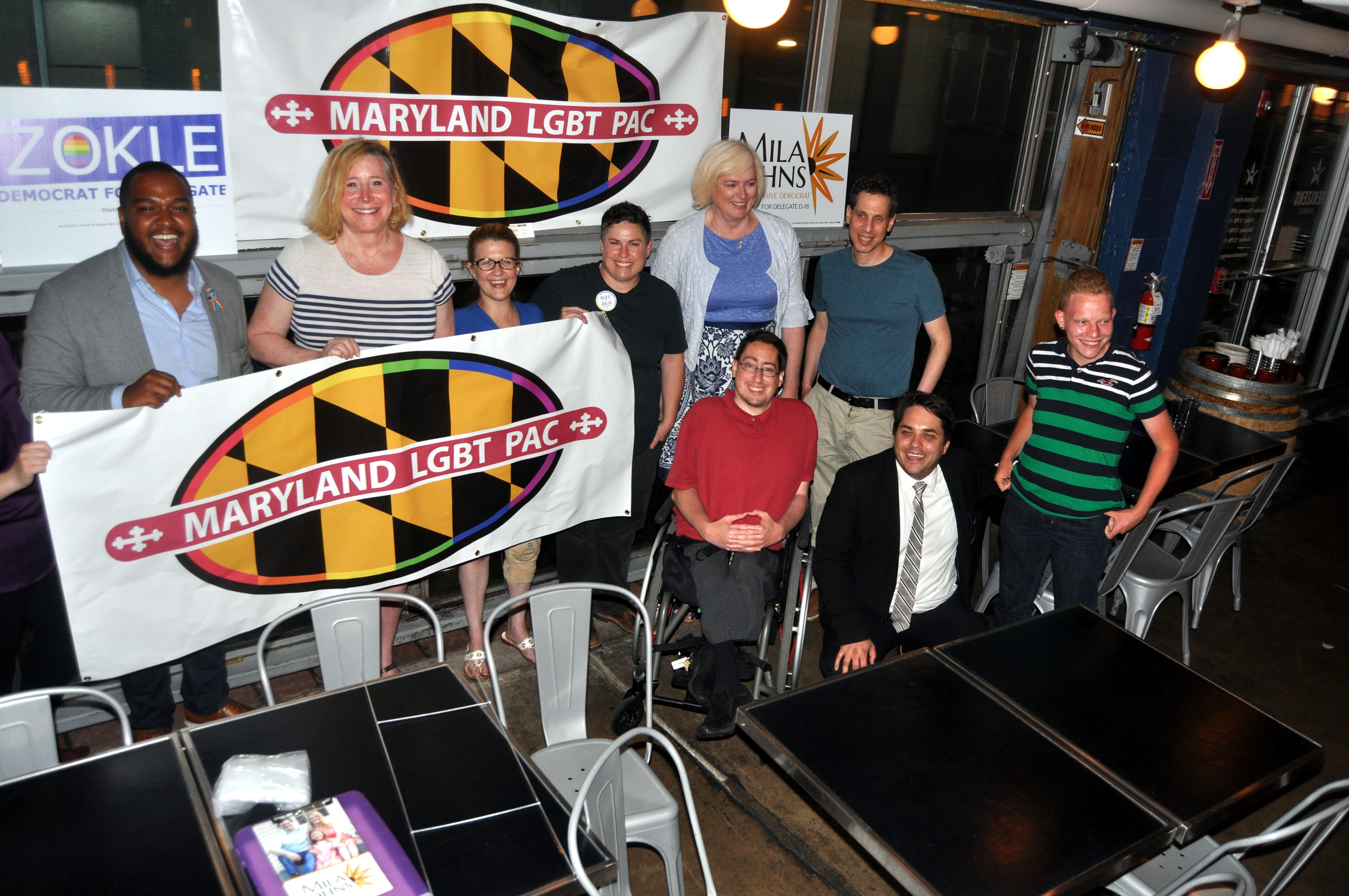
Fair (center bottom) at a Maryland LGBT PAC campaign event, 2018

In May 2018, Fair launched the Maryland LGBT PAC, a political action committee that seeks to support openly-LGBT candidates. He currently serves as the executive director of The Frederick Center, a local advocacy group for LGBTQ individuals.

During the 2021 legislative session, Fair worked as a legislative director for state delegate Karen Lewis Young. He stepped down from the position in January 2022 to run for the Maryland House of Delegates, seeking to succeed Young. During the primary, he was endorsed by Young and her husband, Ron Young, the Maryland State Teachers Association, and half a dozen local elected officials. Kris won the Democratic primary, coming in second place behind incumbent state Delegate Ken Kerr with 19.7 percent of the vote.

== In the legislature ==
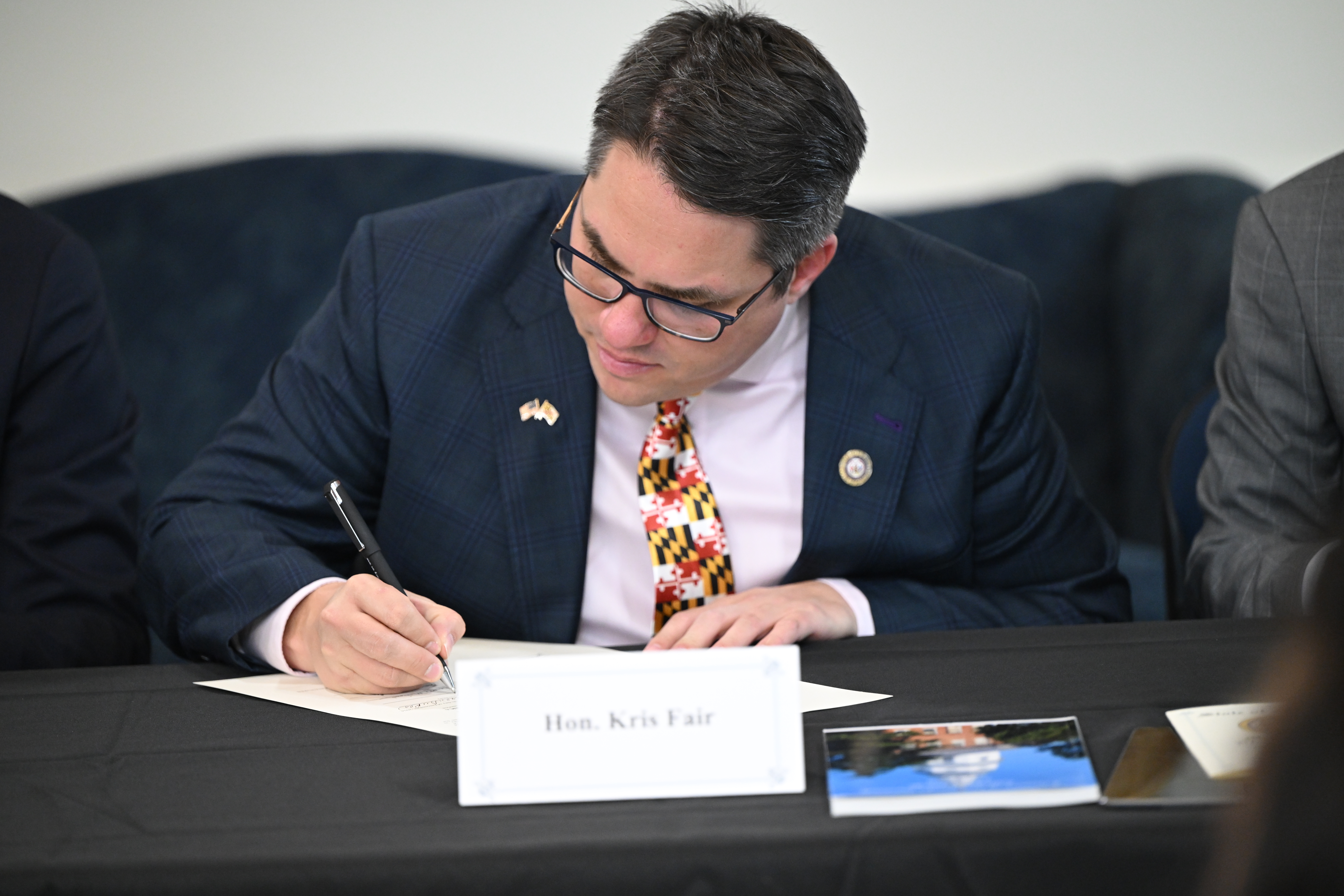
Fair as a member of the electoral college, 2024

Fair was sworn into the Maryland House of Delegates on January 11, 2023. He is the first openly gay lawmaker from western Maryland, and is a member of the House Ways and Means Committee. Fair was appointed the chair of Maryland's LGBTQ+ Caucus during the 2023 session. In the 2024 presidential election, Fair voted as an elector pledged to Kamala Harris.

== Political positions ==
=== Climate change ===
During his House of Delegates campaign, Fair called climate change the "[number one] threat to our humanity". He ran on a platform that included advancing the Climate Solutions Now Act, an omnibus bill passed by the Maryland General Assembly during the 2022 legislative session that would reduce greenhouse gas emissions by 60 percent by 2030, while also advocating for the state to provide agricultural workers with resources to implement regenerative farming techniques and increase biodiversity in their fields.

=== Education ===
Fair supports the Blueprint for Maryland's Future, a sweeping education reform bill passed in 2021, and says he would work to ensure that the funding provided through the Blueprint is spent as legislators intended.

=== Electoral reform ===
During the 2026 legislative session, Fair introduced a bill that would allow unaffiliated voters to change their party affiliation at the polls to vote in partisan primary elections.

In March 2026, during debate on a bill that would replace the party central committee appointment process used to fill vacancies in the Maryland General Assembly with special elections held at the same time as regular state primary elections, Fair amended the bill to include language clarifying language around how Maryland's congressional districts could be drawn.

=== Immigration ===
In October 2025, Fair said he supported repealing the 287(g) program, which allows U.S. Immigration and Customs Enforcement (ICE) to train law enforcement officers to ask the immigration status of arrested individuals, calling the program an "unnecessary redundancy" that undermines residents' faith in local law enforcement. In September 2026, following a violent ICE confrontation with protesters in Frederick, Maryland, Fair called on Congress to "utilize their unilateral power that they have to rein in these out-of-control federal agents".

=== Social issues ===
Fair supported a bill introduced by Delegate Karen Lewis Young during the 2020 legislative session that would prohibit hospitals and related institutions from discriminating against admitting or providing care to people on the basis of "sex, sexual orientation, gender identity, religion or creed, citizenship, age, physical or mental disability, [or] genetic information". In January 2024, he spoke against proposed bills to ban transgender students from competing on girls' sports teams in schools and another that would ban sexually explicit materials from school libraries. During the 2025 legislative session, Fair introduced the Carlton R. Smith Act, a bill to remove a criminal penalty for intentionally transferring HIV to another person, which passed and was signed into law by Governor Wes Moore. During the 2026 legislative session, he introduced a bill that would require insurers to cover a 12-month refill period for hormone replacement therapy and birth control prescriptions.

=== Transportation ===
Fair does not support proposals to widen Interstate 270 and the Capital Beltway, instead supporting efforts to make the state's mass transportation options, such as MARC Trains, more accessible in the state. He also supports expanding the Red Line to Urbana. In May 2026, he supported expanding U.S. Route 15 through the city of Frederick and changes to Interstate 270, but also supported expanding mass transit options to move more people and put fewer cars on the road.

== Personal life ==
Fair is openly gay and married to his husband Dominick Fair (née Barretta) as of August 2013.

== Electoral history ==
Frederick City Board of Aldermen Democratic Primary Election, 2017
| Party | Candidate | Votes | % |
|---|---|---|---|
| Democratic | Donna Kuzemchak | 1,795 | 14.8 |
| Democratic | Kelly Russell | 1,794 | 14.7 |
| Democratic | Roger Wilson | 1,652 | 13.6 |
| Democratic | Ben MacShane | 1,412 | 11.6 |
| Democratic | Derek Shackelford | 1,378 | 11.3 |
| Democratic | Kris Fair | 1,235 | 10.2 |
| Democratic | Todd Anderson | 1,019 | 8.4 |
| Democratic | Kim L Williams | 737 | 6.1 |
| Democratic | Antonio Bowens | 627 | 5.2 |
| Democratic | Jeannette Bartelt | 521 | 4.3 |

Maryland House of Delegates District 3 Democratic Primary Election, 2022
| Party | Candidate | Votes | % |
|---|---|---|---|
| Democratic | Kenneth P. Kerr | 5,628 | 19.8 |
| Democratic | Kris Fair | 5,598 | 19.7 |
| Democratic | Karen Simpson | 4,450 | 15.6 |
| Democratic | Josh Bokee | 3,618 | 12.7 |
| Democratic | Tarolyn C. Thrasher | 3,489 | 12.3 |
| Democratic | William "Billy" Reid | 3,295 | 11.6 |
| Democratic | Stephen Slater | 2,364 | 8.3 |

Maryland House of Delegates District 3 election, 2022
| Party | Candidate | Votes | % |
|---|---|---|---|
| Democratic | Kenneth P. Kerr | 26,270 | 24.91 |
| Democratic | Karen Simpson | 25,945 | 24.60 |
| Democratic | Kris Fair | 25,602 | 24.27 |
| Republican | Kathy Diener | 13,699 | 12.99 |
| Republican | Justin Wages | 13,535 | 12.83 |
| Write-in | | 429 | 0.41 |
