= Carol L. Krimm =

American politician (born 1951)

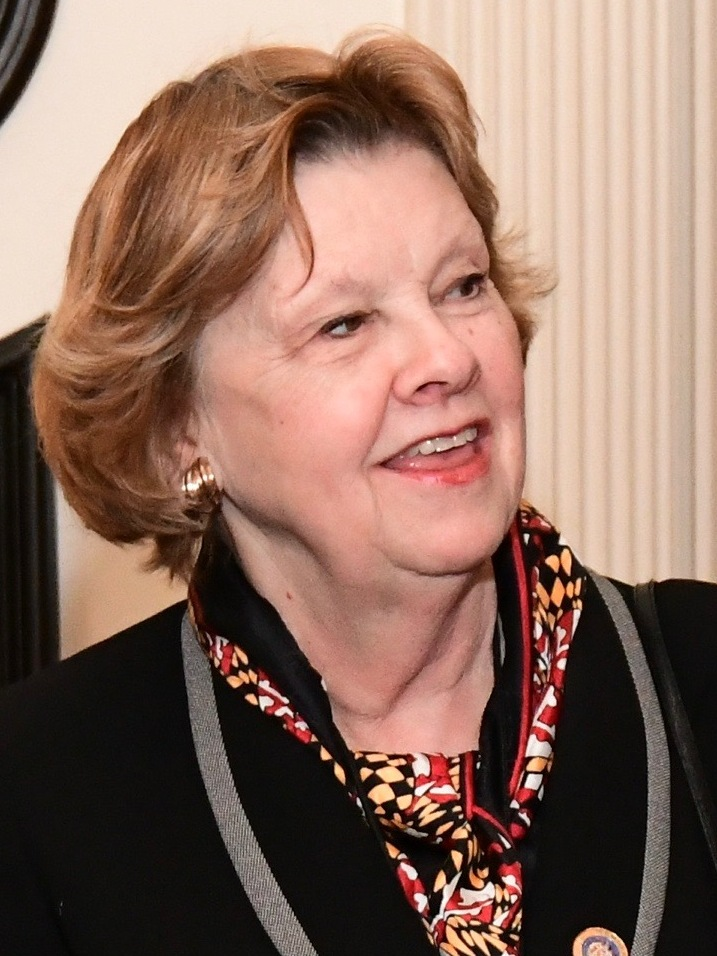
- Krimm in 2019

Member of the Maryland House of Delegates from the 3A district
- In office January 14, 2015 – January 11, 2023 Serving with Karen Lewis Young
- Preceded by: Patrick N. Hogan
- Succeeded by: Karen Simpson

Personal details
- Born: January 5, 1951 (age 75) Cumberland, Maryland, U.S.
- Party: Democratic

Carol L. Krimm (born January 5, 1951) is an American politician who served in the Maryland House of Delegates from district 3A from 2015 to 2023.

== Early life and career ==
Krimm was born in Cumberland, Maryland on January 5, 1951, where she attended Bishop Walsh School. She later graduated from the University of Maryland, where she earned a paralegal certificate, and from Frostburg State University, where she earned a B.A. degree, and later an M.B.A. degree, in political science. She entered politics in 2007 by becoming a member of the Maryland Democratic Party. From 2009 to 2013, she served as a legislative aide to delegates C. Sue Hecht and Galen R. Clagett, who both represented District 3A in the Maryland House of Delegates.

In 2009, Krimm was elected to the Frederick Board of Aldermen. During her term, she served on the city's Airport Commission and Taxicab Commission.

In January 2014, Krimm announced her candidacy for the Maryland House of Delegates. She received 36.3 percent of the vote in the Democratic primary and 28.0 percent of the vote in the general election.

== In the legislature ==
Krimm was sworn into the Maryland House of the Delegates on January 14, 2015.

=== Committee assignments ===
- Appropriations Committee, 2015–2023 (oversight committee on pensions, 2015–2023; vice-chair, transportation & the environment subcommittee, 2019–2023, member, 2015–2023; member, capital budget subcommittee, 2020–2023)
- Joint Committee on Ending Homelessness, 2015–2023
- Special Joint Committee on Pensions, 2015–2023
- House Chair, Joint Audit and Evaluation Committee, 2020–2023
- Work Group to Study Shelter and Supportive Services for Unaccompanied Homeless Minors, 2019–2020

=== Other memberships ===
- Maryland Legislative Latino Caucus, 2015–2023
- Maryland Military Installation Legislative Caucus, 2017–2023
- Maryland Legislative Transit Caucus, 2019–2023
- President, Women Legislators of Maryland, 2020–2021 (member, 2015–2023; 2nd vice-president, 2016–2018; 1st vice-president, 2018–2019; vice-president, 2019–2020)
- Maryland Veterans Caucus, 2022–2023 (house executive board, 2022–2023)

== Political positions ==
=== Housing ===
In 2020, Krimm co-sponsored House Bill 206, which provided government aid to unaccompanied minors. The bill unanimously passed both chambers of the Maryland General Assembly and became law. She also introduced legislation that would require real estate agents or homeowners to disclose that a property is prone to sinkholes. The bill unanimously passed the Maryland House of Delegates, but did not receive a vote in the Maryland Senate. Krimm reintroduced the bill during the 2021 session, where it passed both chambers and became law.

=== Economy and jobs ===
Krimm introduced legislation during the 2019 legislative session that would have loosened franchise restrictions on small brewers. The bill passed both chambers of the Maryland General Assembly with unanimous support and was signed into law by Governor Larry Hogan.

Krimm is an advocate of remote work. In July 2020, Krimm urged Maryland Transportation Secretary Gregory Slater to investigate ways to increase remote work and other alternative work techniques to reduce traffic congestion. In August 2020, she suggested the immediate creation of a blue ribbon commission to take advantage of the increase in remote work during the COVID-19 pandemic. During the 2021 session, Krimm introduced legislation that would require state and local governments to develop plans for remote working and to encourage private businesses to adopt remote working practices. The bill passed and became law.

=== Environment ===
During the 2020 session, Krimm sponsored legislation that would increase funding for the Maryland Healthy Soils Program.

== Electoral history ==
- 2014 Race for Maryland House of Delegates – 3A District (Democratic Primary)

Voters to choose two:

Name	Votes	Percent	Outcome
Carol L. Krimm, Democratic	3,087	36.3%	Won
Karen Lewis Young, Democratic	2,938	34.5%	Won
Roger Wilson, Democratic	1,938	22.8%	
Nicholas Bouquet, Democratic	549	6.4%	

- 2014 Race for Maryland House of Delegates – 3A District (General Election)

Voters to choose two:

Name	Votes	Percent	Outcome
Carol L. Krimm, Democratic	11,654	28.0%	Won
Karen Lewis Young, Democratic	10,944	26.3%	Won
Paul Smith, Republican	9,930	23.9%	
Victoria Wilkins, Republican	8,981	21.6%	
Other write-ins	47	0.1%	

- 2018 Race for Maryland House of Delegates – 3A District (Democratic Primary)

Voters to choose two:

Name	Votes	Percent	Outcome
Karen Lewis Young, Democratic	5,393	45.4%	Won
Carol L. Krimm, Democratic	4,460	37.5%	Won
Ryan Trout, Democratic	2,034	17.1%	

- 2018 Race for Maryland House of Delegates – 3A District (General Election)

Voters to choose two:

Name	Votes	Percent	Outcome
Karen Lewis Young, Democratic	18,725	31.4%	Won
Carol L. Krimm, Democratic	18,705	31.3%	Won
Mike Bowersox, Republican	11,157	18.7%	
James Dvorak, Republican	9,568	16.0%	
Jeremy Harbaugh, Libertarian	1,492	2.5%	
Other write-ins	64	0.1%	
