= Ronald N. Young =

American politician

Ronald Young
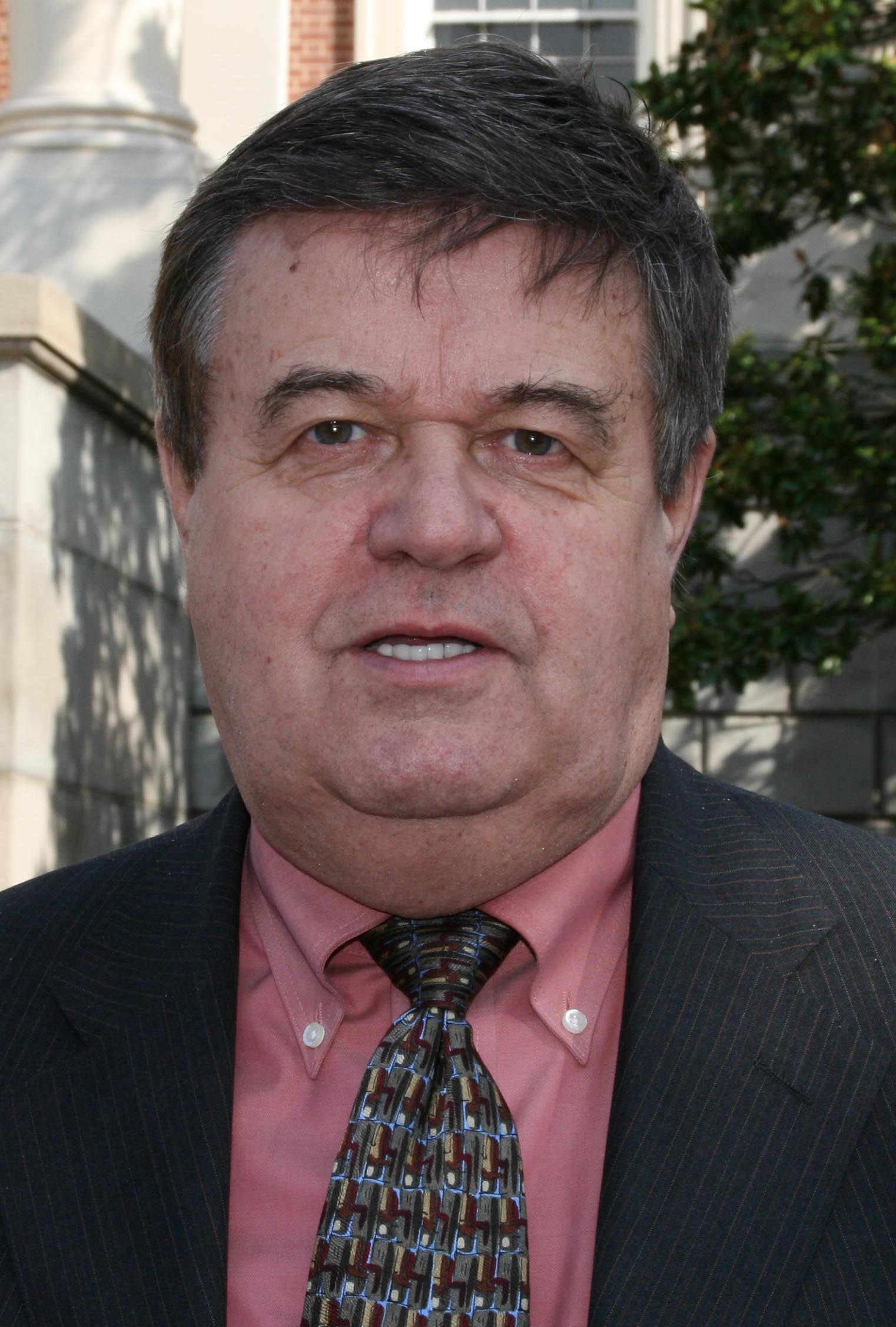

Member of the Maryland Senate from the 3rd district
- In office January 12, 2011 – January 11, 2023
- Preceded by: Alex Mooney
- Succeeded by: Karen Lewis Young

Mayor of Frederick
- In office 1974–1990
- Preceded by: Paul Magaha
- Succeeded by: Paul Gordon

Personal details
- Born: Ronald Nelson Young; October 19, 1940 (age 85) Frederick, Maryland, U.S.
- Party: Democratic
- Spouse: Karen Lewis (m. 2006)
- Children: 5
- Education: Frederick Community College; University of Maryland, College Park (BA); McDaniel College (MEd)

Ronald Nelson Young (born October 19, 1940) is an American consultant, teacher, and politician. He was a member of the Maryland State Senate from 2011 to 2023 and previously served as a mayor of Frederick, Maryland, serving from 1974 to 1990.

== Background ==
Ronald Young was born in Frederick, Maryland and was raised in Frederick. He attended and graduated from Frederick High School. Young attended Frederick Community College and graduated with an Associate in Arts degree. He then attended the University of Maryland, College Park in College Park, Maryland and received a Bachelor of Arts degree in history and government.

Young completed his formal education by earning a Masters of Education degree in administration and supervision from Western Maryland College (later McDaniel College) in Westminster, Maryland.

== Public office ==
Young became involved in local politics in the late 1960s, primarily in the Frederick County Young Democrats organization along with several friends, among them Galen R. Clagett. Young and Clagett both ran for the Frederick City Board of Aldermen in 1969, and Young was elected and served on the Board of Aldermen from 1970 to 1974 during mayor E. Paul Magaha's administration.

=== Mayor of Frederick ===
In 1973, Young ran for mayor of Frederick. He defeated former mayor and serving alderman Donald B. Rice in the Democratic primary and then defeated serving alderman Glenmore Rice in the general election. Young assumed the role of mayor in 1974 at the age of 34. Young was re-elected as mayor in 1977, 1981 and 1985. In 1989, he was defeated by Paul P. Gordon in the general election in a contested election, ending sixteen years of service as Frederick's mayor.

During Young's years as mayor, he pursued various projects, including the Carroll Creek flood control project, the Market Street underground wiring project, the Weinberg Center for the Arts, Harry Grove Stadium, Clustered Spires Golf Course, and the revitalization of downtown Frederick.

== Later years ==
Young worked in commercial real estate, as a part-time college instructor at Frederick Community College, and as a consultant in the years immediately following his defeat as mayor.

In 1991, he worked for the State of Maryland in the Maryland Department of Planning. Young later served under Governor Parris Glendening as the Deputy Secretary of the Maryland Department of Natural Resources and served as the Deputy Secretary of the Maryland Department of Planning until leaving in 2000 after a dispute with Glendening.

In 2001, Young accepted the position of town manager of Indian Head, Maryland. He served until 2005, when he decided to make one more run for mayor of Frederick.

After his defeat for the mayoralty of Frederick City by William J. Holtzinger, Young maintained a semi-retired lifestyle. He is still involved in commercial real estate, consulting, novel-writing, and painting.

== In the Senate ==
In 2010, Young decided to run for Maryland State Senator for District 3. He defeated Don DeArmon in the Democratic primary in September 2010, and defeated incumbent Senator Alex X. Mooney in the general election in November 2010. Young was sworn in on January 12, 2011 and appointed to the Senate's Education, Health and Environmental Affairs Committee. Senator Young also serves on the Alcoholic Beverages, Environment, and Labor, Licensing, and Regulations Subcommittees.

In the 2012 legislative session his social media bill (SB 434) provided the model language for the federal legislation on the same issue.

Senator Young has voted in favor of gay marriage, the Maryland Dream Act, congressional redistricting, prohibiting smoking in a car where children are present, and to expand gambling.

During the 2013 legislative session Young introduced a bill that asks drivers who are renewing or obtaining a driver’s license if they want to opt out of the organ donor program, a change from the current system that asks drivers if they’d like to become a donor.

In 2014, Young was re-elected to the State Senate. Senator Young sits on the Education, Health, and Environmental Affairs Committee and is Chair of the Comptrollers Issues Subcommittee which deals with Alcohol, Labor, Licensing, and Regulations. He also serves on the Education Subcommittee as well as the Joint Committee on Program Open Space and Agricultural Preservation. Senator Young is a Senate Representative to the Financial Education and Capability Commission and serves on the National Conference of State Legislation's Natural Resource and Infrastructure Committee.

In 2021, Young announced that he would not seek another term on the State Senate. He endorsed his wife, Karen Lewis Young, to succeed him in representing Maryland's 3rd legislative district.

== Affiliations ==
Young is a member of a number of organizations: 1968–Present he helped create and serves on the board of the Frederick Community Action Agency, 2006–present he is on the board of directors for Goodwill Industries, 2008–present he is on the advisory board for Maryland Shakespeare Theater, the president of East Frederick Rising from 2006-2010, and a member of the following organizations: Rotary Club of Carroll Creek, 1000 Friends of Maryland, American Planning Association, American Legion, Chesapeake Bay Foundation, Benevolent and Protective Order of Elks, Fraternal Order of Owls, National Association for the Advancement of Colored People (NAACP), U.S. Tennis Association, and the Urban Land Institute. Ron Young is also the former President of Delaplaine Visual Arts Center, the Frederick Arts Council, and the Frederick Festival of the Arts. He is a former trustee for the Maryland Art Place and a former member of the Forum for Rural Maryland, Rural Legacy Board, board of directors, and the Way Station.
