= Karen Lewis Young =

American politician (born 1951)

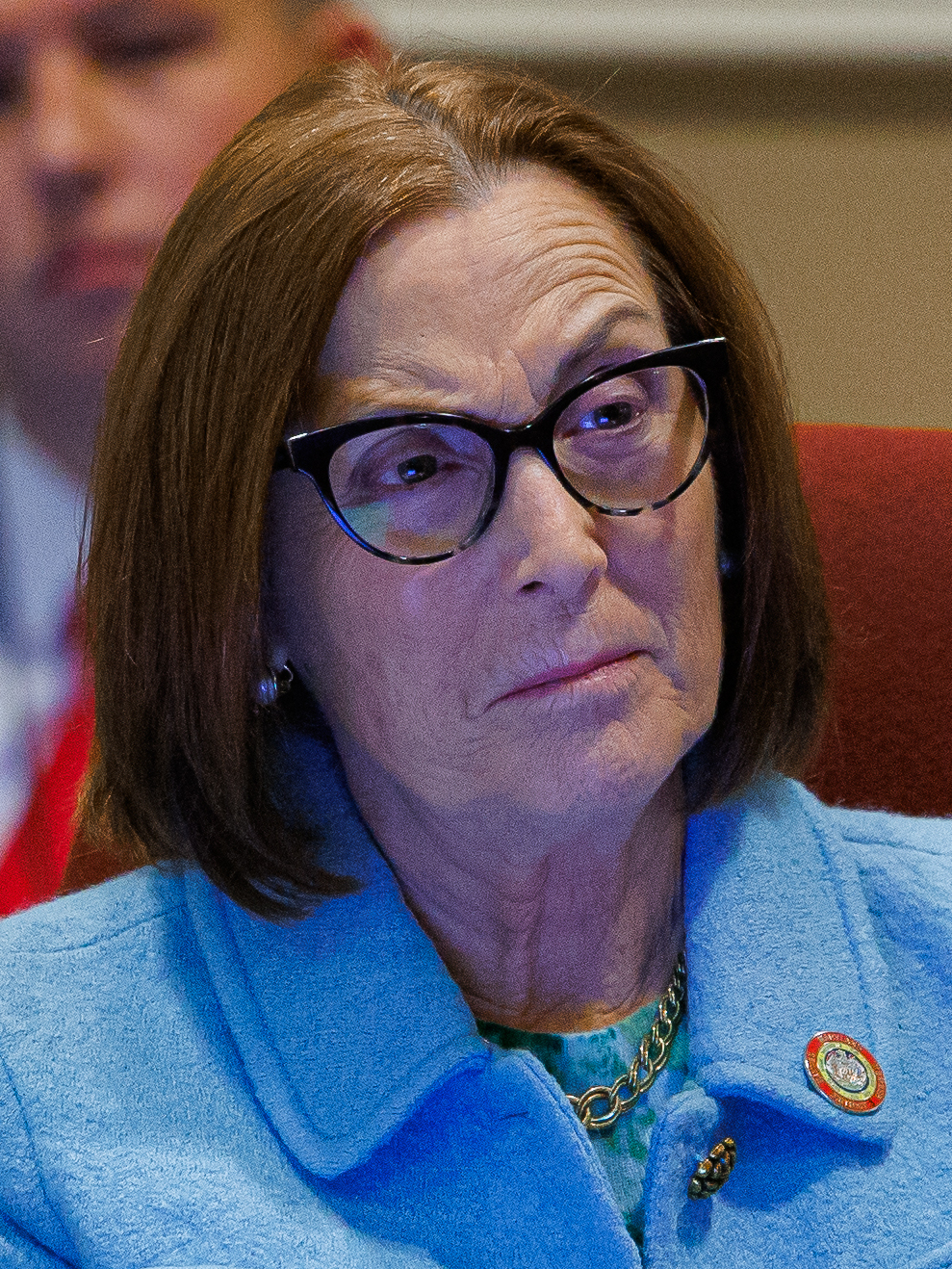
- Young in 2025

Member of the Maryland Senate from the 3rd district
- Incumbent
- Assumed office January 11, 2023
- Preceded by: Ronald N. Young

Member of the Maryland House of Delegates from the 3A district
- In office January 14, 2015 – January 11, 2023 Serving with Carol L. Krimm
- Preceded by: Galen R. Clagett
- Succeeded by: Kris Fair

Personal details
- Born: June 21, 1951 (age 75) New York City, New York, U.S.
- Party: Democratic
- Spouse: Ronald N. Young (m. 2006)
- Children: 5
- Education: Franklin & Marshall College (BA); Columbia University (MA, MBA)
- Occupation: Financial services executive

Karen Lewis Young (born June 21, 1951) is an American politician who has served in the Maryland Senate from District 3 since 2023. She previously served as a member of the Maryland House of Delegates from District 3A from 2015 to 2023.

== Early life and career ==
Lewis Young was born to a Jewish family in The Bronx on June 21, 1951, and was raised in Montoursville, Pennsylvania. She attended Franklin & Marshall College, where she earned a Bachelor of Arts degree in history in 1973, and Columbia University, where she earned a Master of Arts degree in American history in 1974 and a Master of Business Administration degree in marketing in 1977. She worked at a variety of financial firms, including Citibank, Capital One, Chase Manhattan Bank, and American Express, from 1996 to 2008 and operated her own consulting business, Karen Lewis Market Research, from 2004 to 2006.

Lewis Young moved to Frederick, Maryland in 1996 to do direct marketing for Farmers and Mechanics National Bank.

In May 2009, Lewis Young announced that she would run for a seat on the Frederick Board of Aldermen, motivated by the 2008 United States presidential election and her community involvement. She earned 14.34 percent of the vote in the Democratic primaries and 11.57 percent of the vote in the general election.

In 2013, Lewis Young unsuccessfully ran for mayor of Frederick, earning 31.10 percent of the vote in the general election.

== In the legislature ==
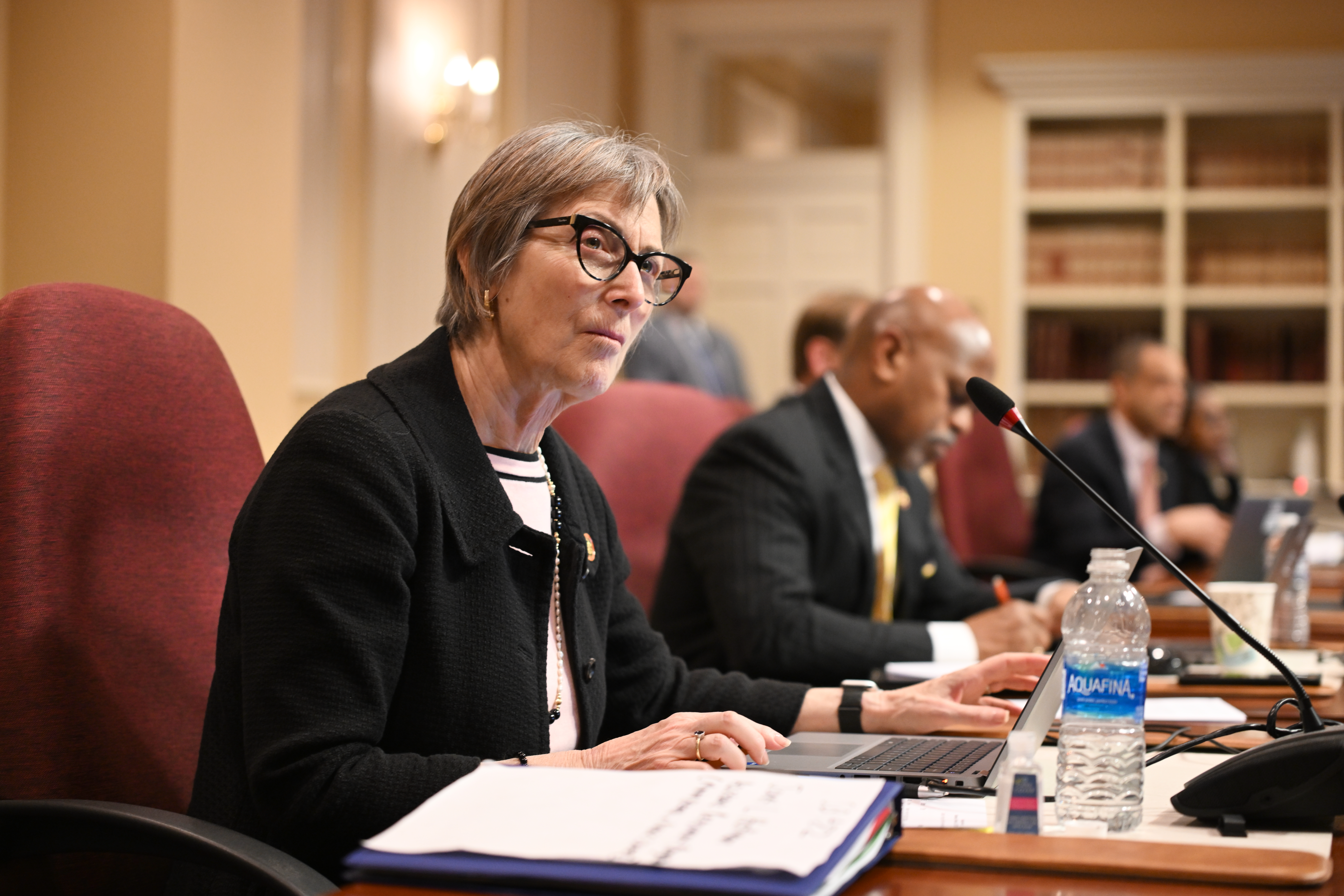
Lewis Young in the Education, Energy, and the Environment Committee, 2023

In February 2014, Lewis Young announced that she would run for the Maryland House of Delegates, seeking to succeed delegate Galen R. Clagett, who was retiring that year. She received 34.5 percent of the vote in the Democratic primary election and defeated Republican challengers Victoria Wilkins and county commissioner Paul Smith in the general election with 26.3 percent of the vote.

Lewis Young was sworn into the Maryland House of Delegates on January 14, 2015. She was a member of the Health and Government Operations Committee. Upon her swearing in, she and her husband Ronald N. Young became the first husband and wife to simultaneously serve together in the Maryland General Assembly. Lewis Young was subsequently re-elected to a second term in 2018.

Lewis Young participated in the Women's March in Frederick following the inauguration of Donald Trump. During the 2020 Democratic Party presidential primaries, she served as a delegate to the Democratic National Convention, pledged to Joe Biden.

In June 2021, Lewis Young announced that she would run for Maryland Senate in 2022, seeking to succeed her husband, Ronald, who later endorsed her campaign. Lewis Young won the Democratic primary on July 19, 2022, defeating county school board member Jay Mason with 68.3 percent of the vote, and later defeated Republican Angela Ariel McIntosh in the general election with 66.5 percent of the vote.

Lewis Young was sworn into the Maryland Senate on January 11, 2023, becoming the first woman elected to represent western Maryland in the Senate. She is a member of the Education, Energy, and Environment Committee. Lewis Young was a delegate to the 2024 Democratic National Convention, pledged to Kamala Harris.

== Political positions ==
=== Development initiatives ===
Lewis Young supports requiring data centers to generate their own energy on-site using clean energy. In March 2026, she called on Governor Wes Moore and other state leaders to enforce stricter requirements on data centers in Maryland.

=== Education ===
In December 2015, Lewis Young said she disagreed with Governor Larry Hogan's decision to withhold funding from Maryland's costliest public school systems.

During the 2017 legislative session, Lewis Young supported a bill to give the student member of the Frederick County Board of Education partial voting rights. She criticized Republican members of the Frederick County Delegation for filibustering the bill and, following the bill dying in the Frederick County Delegation, introduced the bill in the General Assembly. The bill was reintroduced in 2020.

In April 2026, Lewis Young supported many of the programs prescribed by the Blueprint for Maryland's Future, but described the costs associated with its mandates on local governments as "not necessarily realistic".

=== Environment ===
During the 2023 legislative session, Lewis Young introduced legislation to strengthen the state's EmPOWER energy efficiency program by expanding its scope to include greenhouse gas emissions reductions. The bill, which was opposed by state electric utilities companies, died in committee.

=== Health care ===
During the 2015 legislative session, Lewis Young introduced a bill to encourage the prescription of abuse-deterrent painkillers to combat the heroin epidemic. The bill passed and was signed into law by Governor Larry Hogan. In 2016, she introduced a bill criminalizing the improper prescribing of certain drugs, which died in committee. In 2019, she supported a bill to create supervised injection sites to prevent drug overdoses.

During the 2016 legislative session, Lewis Young introduced a "right to try" bill that would allow terminally ill patients to try medication approved by the Food and Drug Administration but not available to the general public. The bill was reintroduced in 2017, during which it passed and became law.

During the 2018 legislative session, Lewis Young introduced a bill to ask the federal government to divert money to Maryland used to offset the cost of high-risk patients on the Affordable Care Act's insurance pool, instead using it under a new "reinsurance program" under the Maryland Health Benefit Exchange. The bill passed and became law with Governor Hogan's signature, and the plan was approved by federal regulators in August 2018.

In 2019, Lewis Young introduced a bill to establish a Patients' Bill of Rights. The bill passed and was signed into law by Governor Hogan.

In March 2019, Lewis Young voted for the End-of-Life Option Act, which would have provided palliative care to terminally ill adults.

During the 2022 legislative session, Lewis Young introduced a bill to protect public health officials and hospital workers from threats, citing harassment directed toward health officials following the COVID-19 pandemic.

During the 2026 legislative session, Lewis Young introduced a bill that would eliminate state tax deductions for pharmaceutical advertising.

=== Immigration ===
During the 2025 legislative session, Lewis Young supported the Maryland Values Act, which would have prohibited counties from entering into 287(g) programs with U.S. Immigration and Customs Enforcement.

=== Minimum wage ===
During the 2017 legislative session, Lewis Young introduced a bill requiring companies to include salary information in job postings and limit employers' ability to ask job applicants about their salary history.

=== Redistricting ===
In November 2015, Lewis Young said she supported using an independent redistricting commission to draw Maryland's congressional districts, but said she preferred a "national solution" to gerrymandering. In November 2025, she said she was leaning against mid-decade redistricting in Maryland but "keeping an open mind". In February 2026, Young said opposed holding a vote on a bill that would redraw Maryland's congressional districts to improve the Democratic Party's chances of winning the 1st congressional district, the only congressional district held by Republicans in the state, saying that she believed the proposed map was unconstitutional and would confuse voters.

=== Social issues ===
Lewis Young supported efforts to repeal "Maryland, My Maryland" as the official state song, noting in 2021 that the song was adopted during "one of the most racist periods in Maryland". She also supported the relocation of the Roger B. Taney Monument at the Maryland State House.

During the 2015 legislative session, Lewis introduced a bill to prevent people convicted of animal abuse from adopting or buying a pet.

In 2017, Lewis Young introduced a bill requiring the Maryland State Police to create a statewide sexual assault tracking system.

In January 2019, Lewis Young was one of nine Maryland lawmakers to add their names to a manifesto signed by 326 state legislators to reaffirm their commitment to protecting abortion rights.

During the 2022 legislative session, Lewis Young introduced legislation to start a pilot program for court-ordered mental health treatment.

=== Transportation ===
Lewis Young supports expanding Interstate 270 and increasing public transit options in Maryland.

== Personal life ==
Lewis Young met her future husband Ronald N. Young in 2003, when she was working as the Weinberg Center's chairwoman. The couple married in 2006. Together, they have five sons, including Blaine Young, a former Republican member of the Frederick County Board of Commissioners; Brad Young, the president of the Frederick County Council as of 2023; and Brian Young, a former member of the Frederick County Democratic Central Committee.

== Electoral history ==
Frederick Board of Alderman Democratic primary election, 2009
Party	Candidate	Votes	%
Democratic	Karen Lewis Young	1,563	14.3
Democratic	Donna Kuzemchak (incumbent)	1,535	14.1
Democratic	Michael C. O'Connor	1,417	13.0
Democratic	Carol L. Krimm	1,563	12.9
Democratic	Kelly Russell	1,386	12.7
Democratic	Josh Bokee	1,237	11.4
Democratic	David "Kip" Koontz	1,103	10.1
Democratic	John Daniels	913	8.4
Democratic	Andrew Kotkin	344	3.2

Frederick Board of Alderman election, 2009
Party	Candidate	Votes	%
Democratic	Karen Lewis Young	3,765	11.6
Democratic	Michael C. O'Connor	3,573	11.0
Republican	Shelley M. Aloi	3,481	10.7
Democratic	Carol L. Krimm	3,418	10.5
Democratic	Kelly Russell	3,393	10.4
Republican	C. Paul Smith	3,325	10.2
Democratic	Donna Kuzemchak (incumbent)	3,235	9.9
Republican	Alan E. Imhoff	3,229	9.9
Republican	Amanda K. Haddaway	2,824	8.7
Republican	W. C. Huckenpoehler	2,267	7.0
Write-in		30	0.1

Frederick mayoral Democratic primary election, 2013
Party	Candidate	Votes	%
Democratic	Karen Lewis Young	1,247	50.2
Democratic	Galen R. Clagett	991	39.9
Democratic	Carol A. Hirsch	248	10.0

Frederick mayoral election, 2013
Party	Candidate	Votes	%
Republican	Randy McClement (incumbent)	4,121	49.6
Democratic	Karen Lewis Young	2,586	31.1
Independent	Jennifer Dougherty	1,588	19.1
Write-in		20	0.2

Maryland House of Delegates District 3A Democratic primary election, 2014
Party	Candidate	Votes	%
Democratic	Carol L. Krimm	3,087	36.3
Democratic	Karen Lewis Young	2,938	34.5
Democratic	Roger Wilson	1,938	22.8
Democratic	Nicholas Bouquet	549	6.4

Maryland House of Delegates District 3A election, 2014
Party	Candidate	Votes	%
Democratic	Carol L. Krimm	11,654	28.0
Democratic	Karen Lewis Young	10,944	26.3
Republican	Paul Smith	9,930	23.9
Republican	Victoria Wilkins	8,981	21.6
Write-in		47	0.1

Maryland House of Delegates District 3A election, 2018
Party	Candidate	Votes	%
Democratic	Karen Lewis Young (incumbent)	18,725	31.4
Democratic	Carol L. Krimm (incumbent)	18,705	31.3
Republican	Mike Bowersox	11,157	18.7
Republican	James Dvorak	9,568	16.0
Libertarian	Jeremy Harbaugh	1,492	2.5
Write-in		64	0.1

Maryland Senate District 3 Democratic primary election, 2022
Party	Candidate	Votes	%
Democratic	Karen Lewis Young	8,128	71.0
Democratic	Jay Mason	3,327	29.0

Maryland Senate District 3 election, 2022
Party	Candidate	Votes	%
Democratic	Karen Lewis Young	8,128	66.5
Republican	Angela Ariel McIntosh	13,774	33.4
Write-in		67	0.2
