= Sue Hecht =

American politician (1947–2025)

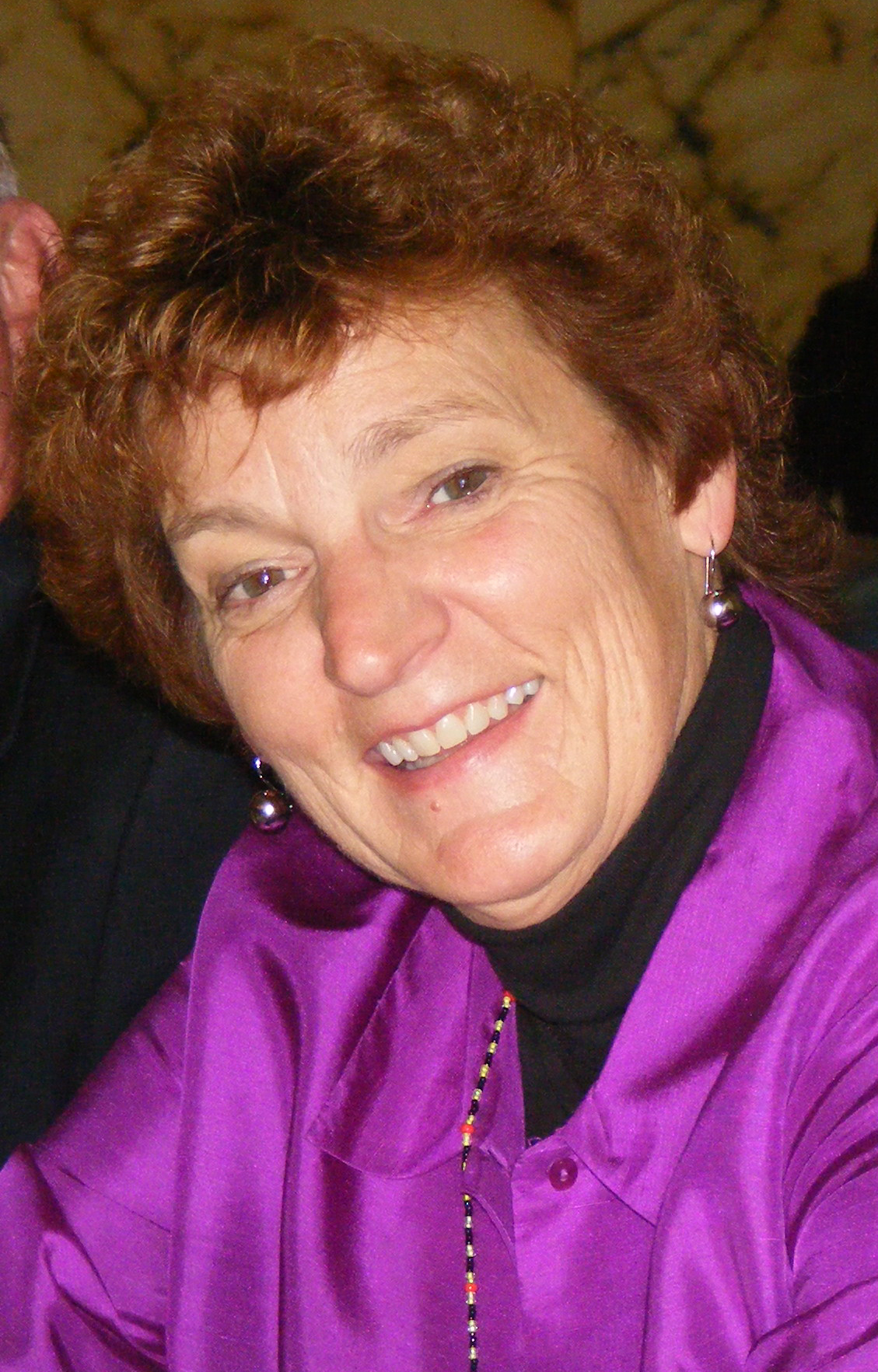
- Hecht in 2008

Member of the Maryland House of Delegates
- In office January 10, 2007 – January 12, 2011
- Preceded by: Patrick N. Hogan
- Succeeded by: Patrick N. Hogan
- Constituency: District 3A
- In office January 11, 1995 – January 8, 2003
- Preceded by: Bruce Poole
- Succeeded by: Galen R. Clagett
- Constituency: District 3

Personal details
- Born: December 7, 1947 Takoma Park, Maryland, U.S.
- Died: September 23, 2025 (aged 77)
- Party: Democratic
- Education: Frostburg State University (MBA)
- Occupation: Educator; writer; non-profit manager

Sue Hecht (December 7, 1947 – September 23, 2025) was an American politician from Maryland and a member of the Democratic Party. She retired in 2011 after serving three terms in the Maryland House of Delegates, representing Maryland's District 3A in Frederick County. She was known for her campaign slogan "Hecht Yes!".

== Life and career ==
Hecht was born in Takoma Park, Maryland, on December 7, 1947. She attended Frederick Community College, Hood College, and Frostburg State University, where she earned her MBA before becoming an adjunct professor at Frostburg State University, a freelance writer, and executive director of a non-profit organization. Hecht has received numerous awards for her work, including being included in a list of Maryland's top 100 women.

Hecht died on September 23, 2025, at the age of 77.

== Election results ==
- 2006 Race for Maryland House of Delegates – District 3A

Voters to choose two:

Name	Votes	Percent	Outcome
Galen R. Clagett, Dem.	12,422	25.7%	Won
Sue Hecht, Dem.	13,900	28.7%	Won
Patrick N. Hogan, Rep.	12,163	25.1%	Lost
Linda Naylor, Rep.	9,873	20.4%	Lost
Other Write-Ins	32	0.1%	Lost

- 2002 Race for Maryland State Senate – District 3

Name	Votes	Percent	Outcome
Alex X. Mooney, Rep.	21,617	55.0%	Won
C. Sue Hecht, Dem.	17,654	44.9%	Lost
Other Write-Ins	66	0.2%	Lost

- 1998 election for Maryland House of Delegates – District 3

Voters to choose three:

Name	Votes	Percent	Outcome
Louise Virginia Snodgrass, Rep.	19,196	21%	Won
C. Sue Hecht, Dem.	17,968	19%	Won
Joseph R. Bartlett, Rep.	15,784	17%	Won
William M. Castle, Rep.	15,251	17%	Lost
Richard L. Stup, Dem.	13,191	14%	Lost
David P. Koontz, Dem.	10,858	12%	Lost

- 1994 election for Maryland House of Delegates – District 3

Voters to choose three:

Name	Votes	Percent	Outcome
J. Anita Stup, Rep.	20,262	25%	Won
Louise Virginia Snodgrass, Rep.	14,071	17%	Won
C. Sue Hecht, Dem.	12,700	15%	Won
Ronald L. Sundergill, Dem.	12,466	15%	Lost
Melvin L. Castle, Rep.	12,227	15%	Lost
Royd Smith, Dem.	10,810	13%	Lost

== Legislative Notes ==
- voted for the Maryland Gang Prosecution Act of 2007 (HB713), subjecting gang members to up to 20 years in prison and/or a fine of up to $100,000
- voted for Jessica's Law (HB 930), eliminating parole for the most violent child sexual predators and creating a mandatory minimum sentence of 25 years in state prison, 2007
- voted for Public Safety – Statewide DNA Database System – Crimes of Violence and Burglary – Post conviction (HB 370), helping to give police officers and prosecutors greater resources to solve crimes and eliminating a backlog of 24,000 unanalyzed DNA samples, leading to 192 arrests, 2008
- voted for Vehicle Laws – Repeated Drunk and Drugged Driving Offenses – Suspension of License (HB 293), strengthening Maryland's drunk driving laws by imposing a mandatory one year license suspension for a person convicted of drunk driving more than once in five years, 2009
- voted for HB 102, creating the House Emergency Medical Services System Workgroup, leading to Maryland's budgeting of $52 million to fund three new Medevac helicopters to replace the State's aging fleet, 2009

For four years, Delegate Hecht annually voted to support classroom teachers, public schools, police and hospitals in Frederick County. Since 2002, funding to schools across the State has increased 82%, resulting in Maryland being ranked top in the nation for K-12 education.
