= Maryland House of Delegates District 31B =

American legislative district

Maryland's legislative district 31B
- Represents part of Anne Arundel County
- Registration: 42.8% Republican; 33.8% Democratic; 22.1% unaffiliated
- Demographics: 77.4% White; 9.6% Black/African American; 0.3% Native American; 3.0% Asian; 0.0% Hawaiian/Pacific Islander; 2.3% Other race; 7.4% Two or more races; 5.4% Hispanic
- Population (2020): 94,575
- Voting-age population: 74,051
- Registered voters: 68,617

Maryland House of Delegates District 31B was a former district of the Maryland House of Delegates between 2015 and 2023. Along with subdistrict 31A, it made up the 31st district of the Maryland Senate. District 31B included part of Anne Arundel County, and was represented by two delegates.

== Demographic characteristics ==
As of the 2020 United States census, the district had a population of 94,575, of whom 74,051 (78.3%) were of voting age. The racial makeup of the district was 73,156 (77.4%) White, 9,076 (9.6%) African American, 302 (0.3%) Native American, 2,875 (3.0%) Asian, 42 (0.0%) Pacific Islander, 2,139 (2.3%) from some other race, and 6,960 (7.4%) from two or more races. Hispanic or Latino of any race were 5,137 (5.4%) of the population.

The district had 68,617 registered voters as of October 17, 2020, of whom 15,160 (22.1%) were registered as unaffiliated, 29,386 (42.8%) were registered as Republicans, 23,168 (33.8%) were registered as Democrats, and 428 (0.6%) were registered to other parties.

== Past Election Results ==
=== 2014 ===
| Name | Party | Votes | Percent | Outcome |
|---|---|---|---|---|
| Nic Kipke | Republican | 20,858 | 39.9% | Won |
| Meagan Simonaire | Republican | 19,555 | 37.4% | Won |
| Jeremiah Chiappelli | Democratic | 6,332 | 12.1% | Lost |
| Doug Morris | Democratic | 5,394 | 10.3% | Lost |
| Other Write-Ins | | 88 | 0.2% | |

=== 2018 ===
| Name | Party | Votes | Percent | Outcome |
|---|---|---|---|---|
| Brian Chisholm | Republican | 20,573 | 33.2% | Won |
| Nic Kipke | Republican | 20,434 | 33.0% | Won |
| Karen Patricia Simpson | Democratic | 11,257 | 18.2% | Lost |
| Harry E. Freeman | Democratic | 9,602 | 15.5% | Lost |
| Other Write-Ins | | 49 | 0.1% | |
