= Maryland House of Delegates District 31A =

American legislative district

Maryland's legislative district 31A
- Represents part of Anne Arundel County
- Registration: 49.8% Democratic; 26.9% Republican; 21.6% unaffiliated
- Demographics: 52.1% White; 25.0% Black/African American; 0.7% Native American; 4.4% Asian; 0.0% Hawaiian/Pacific Islander; 8.4% Other race; 9.3% Two or more races; 14.2% Hispanic
- Population (2020): 46,036
- Voting-age population: 35,500
- Registered voters: 27,682

Maryland House of Delegates District 31A was a former district of the Maryland House of Delegates between 2015 and 2023. Along with subdistrict 31B, it made up the 31st district of the Maryland Senate. District 31A included part of Anne Arundel County, and was represented by one delegate.

== Demographic characteristics ==
As of the 2020 United States census, the district had a population of 46,036, of whom 35,500 (77.1%) were of voting age. The racial makeup of the district was 23,967 (52.1%) White, 11,505 (25.0%) African American, 304 (0.7%) Native American, 2,033 (4.4%) Asian, 22 (0.0%) Pacific Islander, 3,888 (8.4%) from some other race, and 4,302 (9.3%) from two or more races. Hispanic or Latino of any race were 6,552 (14.2%) of the population.

The district had 27,682 registered voters as of October 17, 2020, of whom 5,977 (21.6%) were registered as unaffiliated, 7,445 (26.9%) were registered as Republicans, 13,792 (49.8%) were registered as Democrats, and 249 (0.9%) were registered to other parties.

== Past Election Results ==
=== 2014 ===
Name	Party	Votes	Percent	Outcome
Ned Carey	Democratic	5,221	52.6%	Won
Terry Lynn DeGraw	Republican	4,698	47.3%	Lost
Other Write-Ins		9	0.1%	

=== 2018 ===
Name	Party	Votes	Percent	Outcome
Ned Carey	Democratic	6,976	56.8%	Won
Brooks Bennett	Republican	5,278	43.0%	Lost
Other Write-Ins		24	0.2%	
