= Maryland House of Delegates District 3A =

American legislative district

Maryland's legislative district 3A
- Represents part of Frederick County
- Registration: 49.1% Democratic; 26.5% Republican; 23.1% unaffiliated
- Demographics: 55.8% White; 17.2% Black/African American; 0.6% Native American; 5.7% Asian; 0.0% Hawaiian/Pacific Islander; 9.6% Other race; 11.0% Two or more races; 18.9% Hispanic
- Population (2020): 94,029
- Voting-age population: 72,483
- Registered voters: 59,013

Maryland House of Delegates District 3A was a former district of the Maryland House of Delegates. Along with subdistrict 3B, it made up the 3rd district of the Maryland Senate. District 3A included part of Frederick County and was represented by two delegates. During the 2020 United States redistricting cycle, the district was absorbed into the 3rd district.

== Demographic characteristics ==
As of the 2020 United States census, the district had a population of 94,029, of whom 72,483 (77.1%) were of voting age. The racial makeup of the district was 52,465 (55.8%) White, 16,152 (17.2%) African American, 582 (0.6%) Native American, 5,324 (5.7%) Asian, 32 (0.0%) Pacific Islander, 9,044 (9.6%) from some other race, and 10,377 (11.0%) from two or more races. Hispanic or Latino of any race were 17,778 (18.9%) of the population.

The district had 59,013 registered voters as of October 17, 2020, of whom 13,643 (23.1%) were registered as unaffiliated, 15,651 (26.5%) were registered as Republicans, 28,983 (49.1%) were registered as Democrats, and 297 (0.5%) were registered to other parties.

== Past Election Results ==
=== 1982 ===
Name	Party	Outcome
Paul D. Muldowney	Democratic	Won
D. Michael Auldridge	Republican	Lost

=== 2002 ===
Name	Party	Votes	Percent	Outcome
Patrick N. Hogan	Republican	12,066	26.4%	Won
Galen R. Clagett	Democratic	11,434	25.0%	Won
Dick Zimmerman	Democratic	11,288	24.7%	Lost
Timothy W. Brooks	Republican	10,782	23.6%	Lost
Ron Bird	Democratic	4	0.0%	Lost
Other Write-Ins		168	0.4%	

=== 2006 ===
Name	Party	Votes	Percent	Outcome
Sue Hecht	Democratic	13,900	28.7%	Won
Galen R. Clagett	Democratic	12,422	25.7%	Won
Patrick N. Hogan	Republican	12,163	25.1%	Lost
Linda Naylor	Republican	9,873	20.4%	Lost
Other Write-Ins		32	0.1%	

=== 2010 ===
Name	Party	Votes	Percent	Outcome
Galen R. Clagett	Democratic	13,341	27.5%	Won
Patrick N. Hogan	Republican	12,617	26.0%	Won
Scott Rolle	Republican	11,312	23.3%	Lost
Candy O. Greenway	Democratic	11,203	23.1%	Lost
Other Write-Ins		61	0.1%	

=== 2014 ===
Name	Party	Votes	Percent	Outcome
Carol L. Krimm	Democratic	11,654	28.0%	Won
Karen Lewis Young	Democratic	10,944	26.3%	Won
Paul Smith	Republican	9,930	23.9%	Lost
Victoria Wilkins	Republican	8,981	21.6%	Lost
Other Write-Ins		47	0.1%	

=== 2018 ===
Name	Party	Votes	Percent	Outcome
Karen Lewis Young	Democratic	18,725	31.4%	Won
Carol L. Krimm	Democratic	18,705	31.3%	Won
Mike Bowersox	Republican	11,157	18.7%	Lost
James Dvorak	Republican	9,568	16.0%	Lost
Jeremy Harbaugh	Libertarian	1,492	2.5%	Lost
Other Write-Ins		64	0.1%	
