= Patrick N. Hogan =

American politician (born 1979)

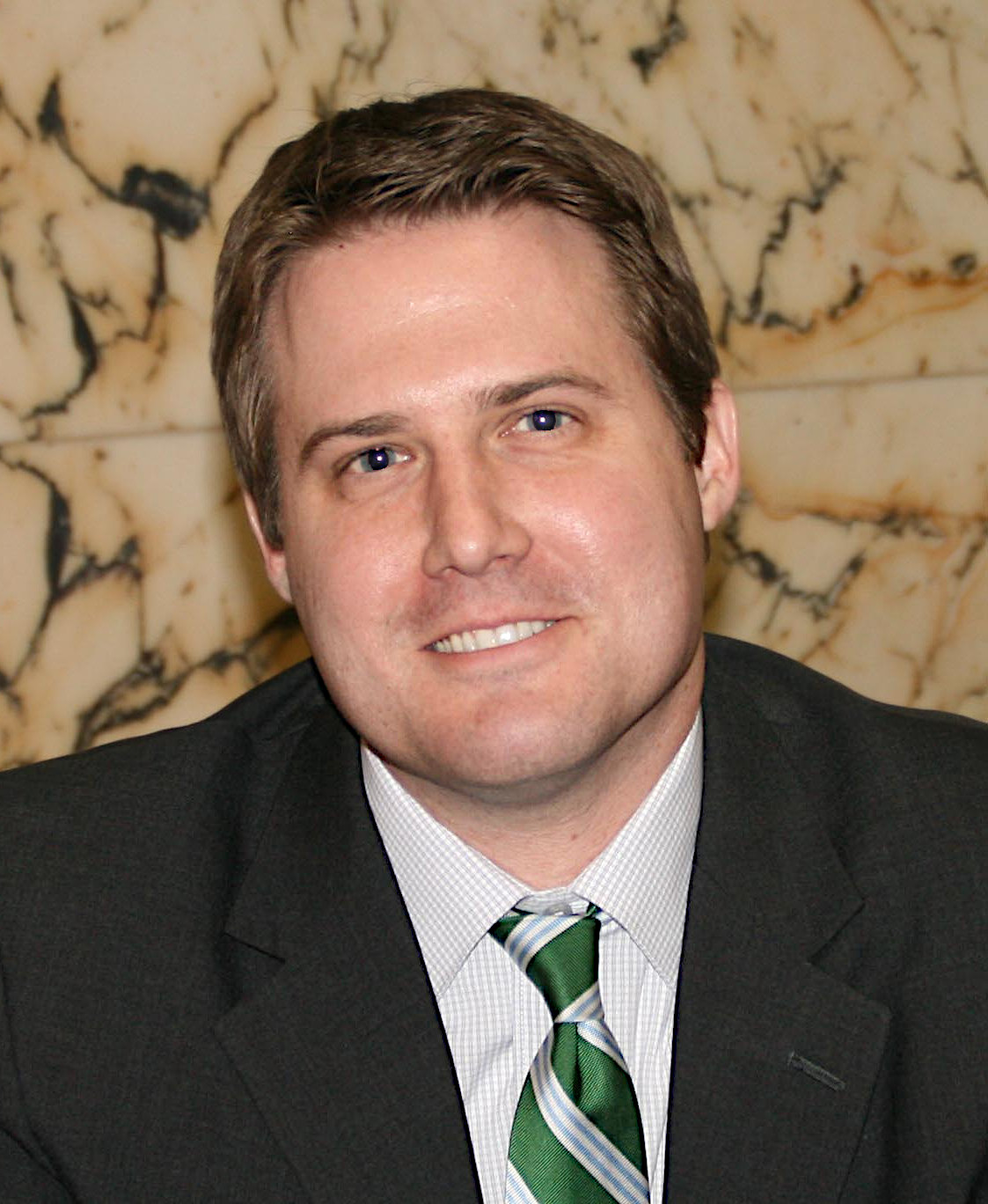

Member of the Maryland House of Delegates from the 3A district
- In office January 12, 2011 – January 14, 2015
- Preceded by: Sue Hecht
- Succeeded by: Carol L. Krimm
- In office January 8, 2003 – January 10, 2007
- Preceded by: redistricted
- Succeeded by: Sue Hecht

Personal details
- Born: Patrick Nicholas Hogan; February 15, 1979 (age 47) Silver Spring, Maryland, U.S.
- Party: Republican
- Parent(s): Lawrence Hogan; Ilona Modly
- Relatives: Larry Hogan (half-brother)
- Education: University of Maryland, College Park (BA)

Patrick Nicholas Hogan (born February 15, 1979) is an American politician and academic administrator who served as a member of the Maryland House of Delegates for District 3A from 2003 to 2007 and again from 2011 to 2015. He is son of former congressman Lawrence Hogan and the younger half-brother of the 62nd Governor of Maryland, Larry Hogan.

== Early life and education ==
Hogan was born in Silver Spring, Maryland. He attended Gonzaga College High School in Washington, D.C. After high school, he graduated from the University of Maryland, College Park in 2002 with his Bachelor of Arts degree in government and politics.

== Career ==
Delegate Hogan was first elected to the Maryland House of Delegates in 2002. He was defeated for re-election in 2006 but re-elected to his old seat in 2010. He did not run for reelection in the 2014 Maryland General Election. During his tenure, Hogan served as a member of the Environmental Matters Committee and several subcommittees.

In addition to his legislative work, Hogan was a member of the steering committee for the Frederick County Drug Treatment Court in 2003. He was on the board of directors of the Metropolitan Washington Council of Governments in 2003, and a member of the Task Force on Business-Owner Compensation in Condemnation Proceedings from 2004 until 2005.

Between his separated terms as a delegate, Hogan was director of development for the YMCA of Frederick County. After his second term, he was vice president of business development for the Hogan Companies and a deputy legislative officer for Maryland's Office of the Governor. Hogan was appointed as the University System of Maryland's vice chancellor for government relations in November 2015, a position he left in October 2023 to join a lobbying firm in Annapolis.

== Personal life ==
Hogan's father is Lawrence Hogan, who represented Maryland's 5th congressional district from 1969 to 1975 and later served as the county executive of Prince George's County. His older half-brother is Larry Hogan, the former governor of Maryland.

== Election results ==
- 2010 Race for Maryland House of Delegates – District 3A

Voters to choose two:

Name	Votes	Percent	Outcome
Galen R. Clagett, Dem.	13,341	27.5%	Won
Patrick N. Hogan, Rep.	25,617	26.0%	Won
Scott L. Rolle, Rep.	11,312	23.3%	Lost
Candy O. Greenway, Dem.	11,203	23.1%	Lost
Other Write-Ins	61	0.1%	Lost

- 2006 Race for Maryland House of Delegates – District 3A

Voters to choose two:

Name	Votes	Percent	Outcome
Sue Hecht, Dem.	13,900	28.7%	Won
Galen R. Clagett, Dem.	12,422	25.7%	Won
Patrick N. Hogan, Rep.	12,163	25.1%	Lost
Linda Naylor, Rep.	9,873	20.4%	Lost
Other Write-Ins	32	0.1%	Lost

- 2002 Race for Maryland House of Delegates – District 3A

Voters to choose two:

Name	Votes	Percent	Outcome
Patrick N. Hogan, Rep.	12,066	26.38%	Won
Galen R. Clagett, Dem.	11,434	25.00%	Won
Dick Zimmerman, Dem.	11,288	24.68%	Lost
Timothy W. Brooks, Rep.	10,782	23.57%	Lost
Other Write-Ins	168	0.37%	Lost
Ron Bird, Dem. (write-in)	4	0.01%	Lost
