= LaToya Nkongolo =

American politician (born 1978)

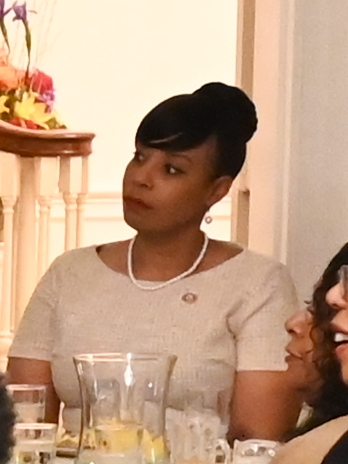

Member of the Maryland House of Delegates from the 31st district
- Incumbent
- Assumed office January 10, 2025 Serving with Nic Kipke and Brian Chisholm
- Appointed by: Wes Moore
- Preceded by: Rachel Muñoz

Personal details
- Born: August 8, 1978 (age 48) Wilmington, Delaware, U.S.
- Party: Republican
- Spouse: Bamoyo (m. 2002)
- Children: 2
- Education: Delaware State University (BA); University of Maryland, Baltimore (MA); Springfield College (MA)
- Occupation: Mental health professional

LaToya Nkongolo (born August 8, 1978) is an American politician who is a member of the Maryland House of Delegates from the 31st district. A member of the Republican Party, she unsuccessfully ran for the Anne Arundel County Board of Education in 2024, losing to incumbent school board member Dana Schallheim.

== Early life and education ==
Nkongolo was born in Wilmington, Delaware, on August 8, 1978. She graduated from Christiana High School, afterwards attending Delaware State University, where she earned a Bachelor of Arts degree in social work, Springfield College, where she earned a master's in organizational management, and the University of Maryland, Baltimore, where she earned a Master of Arts degree in social work.

== Career ==
=== Mental health work ===
Nkongolo has been a licensed therapist for over 25 years and runs her own mental health facility, Work Life Behavioral Health. She previously worked as the family program supervisor for Anne Arundel Medical Center until 2014, when she was hired as the deputy executive director of Nick's Place, a drug and alcohol treatment center. She was involved with many of Anne Arundel County Executive Steve Schuh's opioid abuse prevention campaigns and served on the transition team of Anne Arundel County Executive Steuart Pittman in 2018. As of 2024, Nkongolo is an adjunct professor at Anne Arundel Community College and operates a family wellness workshop at Anne Arundel Medical Center.

=== 2024 Anne Arundel County Board of Education campaign ===
In 2024, Nkongolo ran for the Anne Arundel County Board of Education. During her campaign, she aligned herself closely with Moms for Liberty, supporting initiatives to restrict books in school libraries, increase parental control over school curriculum in areas regarding gender identity and sex education, and ban transgender students from using the bathroom that matches their gender identity. At a fundraiser in June, Nkongolo characterized the school system as an "institution of grooming" and that its pro-LGBTQ policies are "causing mental illness", also voicing opposition to gender neutral bathrooms and transgender athletes. In October 2024, she accused her opponent, Dana Schalleheim, who is Jewish, of using Yom Kippur as an excuse to avoid attending a candidate forum; Schallheim rejected Nkongolo's accusations, saying that she told forum moderators weeks in advance that she would not attend the forum and calling Nkongolo's claims "antisemitic". Ngokgolo lost to Schallheim in the general election on November 5, 2024, and conceded the night of the election.

== Maryland House of Delegates ==
=== 2022 campaign ===
In 2022, Nkongolo ran for the Maryland House of Delegates in District 31 on a platform of "Christian, conservative values" that included support for children's mental health following the COVID-19 pandemic and opposition to school shutdowns and COVID-19 pandemic-related mandates. She was defeated in the Republican primary election by Nic Kipke, Brian Chisholm, and Rachel Muñoz. Following her defeat, Nkongolo helped organize a "Unite the Right" rally with Kimberly Klacik to support statewide Republican candidates, including Dan Cox, but withdrew from the event after the Baltimore Jewish Council said that the event's name marked the first time the name "Unite the Right" was used for an event since the Unite the Right rally in 2017.

=== Tenure ===
In December 2024, after Rachel Muñoz announced that she would resign from the Maryland House of Delegates, Nkongolo applied to fill the remainder of her term in the Maryland House of Delegates. The Anne Arundel County Republican Central Committee voted to nominate Nkongolo to the seat on January 3, 2025. She was appointed by Governor Wes Moore and sworn in on January 10, 2025. Nkongolo has served as a member of the Judiciary Committee since 2025, and as a deputy minority whip since 2026.

During the 2026 elections, Nkongolo was involved with the Maryland Republican Party's efforts to reach out to Black voters.

== Political positions ==
During the 2026 legislative session, Nkongolo introduced a bill that would require private health insurers to provide coverage for scalp cooling for cancer patients. In March 2026, during debate on the Utility RELIEF Act, Nkongolo introduced an amendment that would have eliminated the EmPOWER Maryland program, which gives utility customers access to free and reduced-price smart thermostats.

== Personal life ==
Nkongolo married her husband, Bamoyo, on February 14, 2002. Together, they have two children and live in Severna Park, Maryland. Nkongolo's ancestors were enslaved in the United States.

On January 28, 2024, Nkongolo was arrested and charged with driving while under the influence of alcohol, driving while impaired by alcohol, as well as several vehicle-related charges due to the damaged condition of her car. She pleaded guilty to negligent driving while all alcohol-related charges were later dropped by state prosecutors.

== Electoral history ==
Maryland House of Delegates District 31 Republican primary election, 2022
Party	Candidate	Votes	%
Republican	Nic Kipke (incumbent)	8,764	33.0
Republican	Brian Chisholm (incumbent)	8,261	31.1
Republican	Rachel Muñoz (incumbent)	7,067	26.6
Republican	LaToya Nkongolo	2,465	9.3

Anne Arundel County Board of Education District 5 primary election, 2024
Candidate	Votes	%
Dana Schallheim (incumbent)	9,699	63.96%
LaToya Nkongolo	3,853	25.41%
Tareque O. Farruk	1,612	10.63%

Anne Arundel County Board of Education District 5 election, 2024
Candidate	Votes	%
Dana Schallheim (incumbent)	26,293	60.70%
LaToya Nkongolo	16,664	38.47%
Write-in	356	0.82%
