= Brian Chisholm (politician) =

American politician (born 1970)

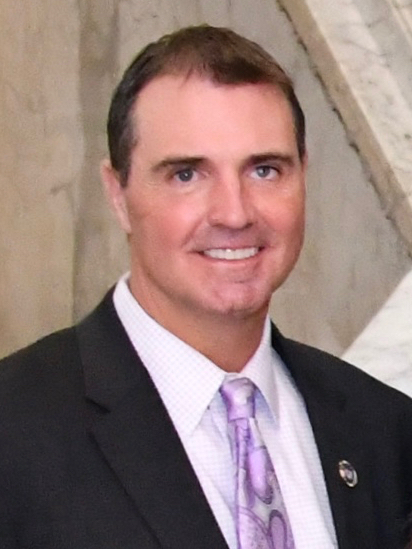

Member of the Maryland House of Delegates
- Incumbent
- Assumed office January 9, 2019 Serving with Nic Kipke and LaToya Nkongolo
- Preceded by: Meagan Simonaire
- Constituency: District 31B (2019–2023); 31st district (2023–present)

Personal details
- Born: Brian Alan Chisholm; November 7, 1970 (age 55) Madison, Wisconsin, U.S.
- Party: Republican
- Spouse: Kristie
- Children: 1
- Education: Clemson University
- Occupation: Mortgage Banker

Brian Alan Chisholm (born November 7, 1970) is an American politician who represents northern Anne Arundel County in the Maryland House of Delegates. A member of the Republican Party, he represented District 31B from 2019 to 2023, afterwards representing the 31st district.

== Early life and education ==
Chisholm was born in Madison, Wisconsin, on November 7, 1970. He graduated from Severna Park High School in Severna Park, Maryland, where he played on the school's football team as a guard and the school's baseball team as a catcher. Chisholm holds a Bachelor of Arts degree in marketing from Clemson University.

== Political career ==
Chisholm was a member of the Pension Oversight Commission of Anne Arundel County, Maryland from 2015 to 2018. He was vice-chair of the commission from 2017 to 2018.

In 2014, Chisholm ran for election to one of two District 31B seats in the Maryland House of Delegates, but came in fourth in a field of eight candidates in the Republican primary. On October 19, 2017, he announced that he would again run for the House of Delegates, and, together with incumbent and fellow Republican Nic Kipke, won. Chisholm was sworn into the Maryland House of Delegates om January 9, 2019, and has served as a member of the Health and Government Operations Committee during his entire tenure. He is also a member of the Maryland Freedom Caucus.

In May 2026, House Speaker Joseline Peña-Melnyk wrote to Chisholm and state delegate Mark N. Fisher to apologize and remove an episode of Fisher's "Dumbest Bill in America" video series in which the lawmakers accused Chinese-born state delegate Chao Wu of being a "Chinese communist spy", frequently using the derogatory term "Chicom", and questioned his motive for introducing a bill to require data transparency in AI training. Chisholm also mocked Wu's accent, responding to a 10-second clip of Wu providing testimony during the bill's hearing by mimicking an Asian accent, and called Wu's job history, which included stints at the Food and Drug Administration and defense contractor Maryland Aerospace, "scary as hell". The legislators' comments were also condemned by the Legislative Black Caucus of Maryland, the Maryland Asian American and Pacific Islander Caucus, and House minority leader Jason Buckel. In response, the Maryland Freedom Caucus released a statement criticizing Peña-Melnyk for "sending private letters policing podcasts and using CCP-style speech tactics" against caucus members. A spokesperson for Peña-Melnyk dismissed the Freedom Caucus's statement, calling it a "deflection tactic to avoid taking accountability for their deeply troubling comments". In a follow-up statement, Chisholm said that his discussion with Fisher was not about Wu's race, ethnicity, or background, and that the conversation should not be whether the lawmakers "should be scolded for asking questions" but rather if Wu is "willing to answer them". In the 2026 elections, the Maryland Legislative Asian American and Pacific Islander Caucus targeted Chisholm and Fisher, citing their xenophobic comments toward Wu.

== Political positions ==
=== COVID-19 pandemic ===
In April 2020, Chisholm sent a letter to the Maryland Department of Health asking the agency to publicly release more information about COVID-19 outbreaks in elder care facilities.

In May 2020, Chisholm attended a Reopen Maryland rally to protest COVID-19 restrictions put into place through executive orders by Governor Larry Hogan.

During the 2021 legislative session, Chisholm introduced a bill that would provide a property tax credit to businesses in Anne Arundel County that were affected by the state's COVID-19 emergency declarations. The bill received a favorable report from the Anne Arundel County Delegation, but stalled in committee.

=== Criminal justice ===
In July 2020, Chisholm organized a "Back the Blue" rally in Annapolis, which he said was separate from the Black Lives Matter movement.

In 2021, Chisholm opposed legislation that would remove the governor of Maryland from the Maryland Parole Commission, and introduced an amendment that would require inmates serving a life sentence to get "unanimous agreement" from the state's parole board to be released. His amendment was rejected in a 91–41 vote.

=== Education ===
In April 2023, Chisholm sent a letter to State Superintendent Mohammed Choudhury accusing the Maryland State Department of Education of hiding scores from failing schools by altering data files available on the department's website. An investigation conducted by the state inspector general found no evidence of these claims.

=== Energy ===
In February 2026, during debate on a bill that would prohibit investor-owned utilities from paying employee bonuses and supervisor compensation with ratepayer dollars, Chisholm introduced two amendments, that would given the Maryland Public Service Commission the ability to allow utilities to continue paying salaries with ratepayer money after a public evidentiary proceeding or if it was needed to ensure system reliability or the utility's response to storms. The amendments were rejected. Later that month, he introduced several bills aimed at lowering electricity prices in Maryland, including the repeal of the Climate Solutions Now Act, withdraw Maryland from the Regional Greenhouse Gas Initiative (RGGI), and repealing certain EmPOWER Maryland fees. In March 2026, during debate on the Utility RELIEF Act, Chisholm introduced an amendment to the bill to withdraw Maryland from RGGI, referring to the program as a "grift".

=== Electoral reform ===
In 2021, Chisholm opposed legislation that would allow registered voters to opt-in to an absentee ballot list instead of reapplying for mail-in ballots before statewide elections, introducing an amendment that would require voters to have a government-issued ID to vote. His amendment was rejected.

During the 2026 legislative session, Chisholm opposed the congressional redistricting map proposed by the Governor's Redistricting Advisory Commission, which would redraw Maryland's 1st congressional district to improve the Democratic Party's chances of winning it, saying that the map would "disenfranchise one million Republicans".

=== National politics ===
In May 2024, Chisholm signed onto a letter condemning the jury's guilty verdict in the Trump hush money trial, calling the ruling a "political prosecution from a kangaroo court and left-leaning prosecutor" that is turning the U.S. justice system into a "third world parody of law and order".

=== Taxes ===
In 2021, Chisholm opposed legislation that would allow Maryland counties to set up a progressive income tax, introducing an amendment that would have required counties to lower the tax on lower income brackets if officials opt to increase the tax for higher income brackets. His amendment was rejected.

== Personal life ==
Chisholm currently lives in Severna Park, Maryland and works as a mortgage banker. He is married and has one child.

Chisholm co-owns, with former state delegate Sid Saab, a fitness gym in Severna Park. In February 2021, a former employee filed a lawsuit against the two lawmakers, alleging that she was retaliated against for reporting sexual harassment by another co-worker. A federal jury ruled for the employee in September 2023.

== Electoral history ==
Maryland House of Delegates District 31B Republican Primary Election, 2014
Party	Candidate	Votes	%
Republican	Nicholaus R. Kipke	3,920	31.0
Republican	Meagan C. Simonaire	3,075	24.3
Republican	Gus Kurtz	1,779	14.1
Republican	Brian A. Chisholm	1,607	12.7
Republican	Faith M. Loudon	1,017	8.1
Republican	Don Dwyer, Jr.	890	7.0
Republican	Paul William Drgos, Jr.	230	1.8
Republican	David Lee Therrien	111	0.9

Maryland House of Delegates District 31B Republican Primary Election, 2018
Party	Candidate	Votes	%
Republican	Nicholaus R. Kipke	4,579	43.2
Republican	Brian Chisholm	4,119	38.9
Republican	John R. Leopold	1,030	9.7
Republican	David Therrien	863	8.1

Maryland House of Delegates District 31B Election, 2018
Party	Candidate	Votes	%
Republican	Brian Chisholm	20,573	33.2
Republican	Nicholaus R. Kipke	20,434	33.0
Democratic	Karen Patricia Simpson	11,257	18.2
Democratic	Harry E. Freeman	9,602	15.5
Write-in	Others	49	0.1
