= Kenneth P. Kerr =

American politician (born 1957)

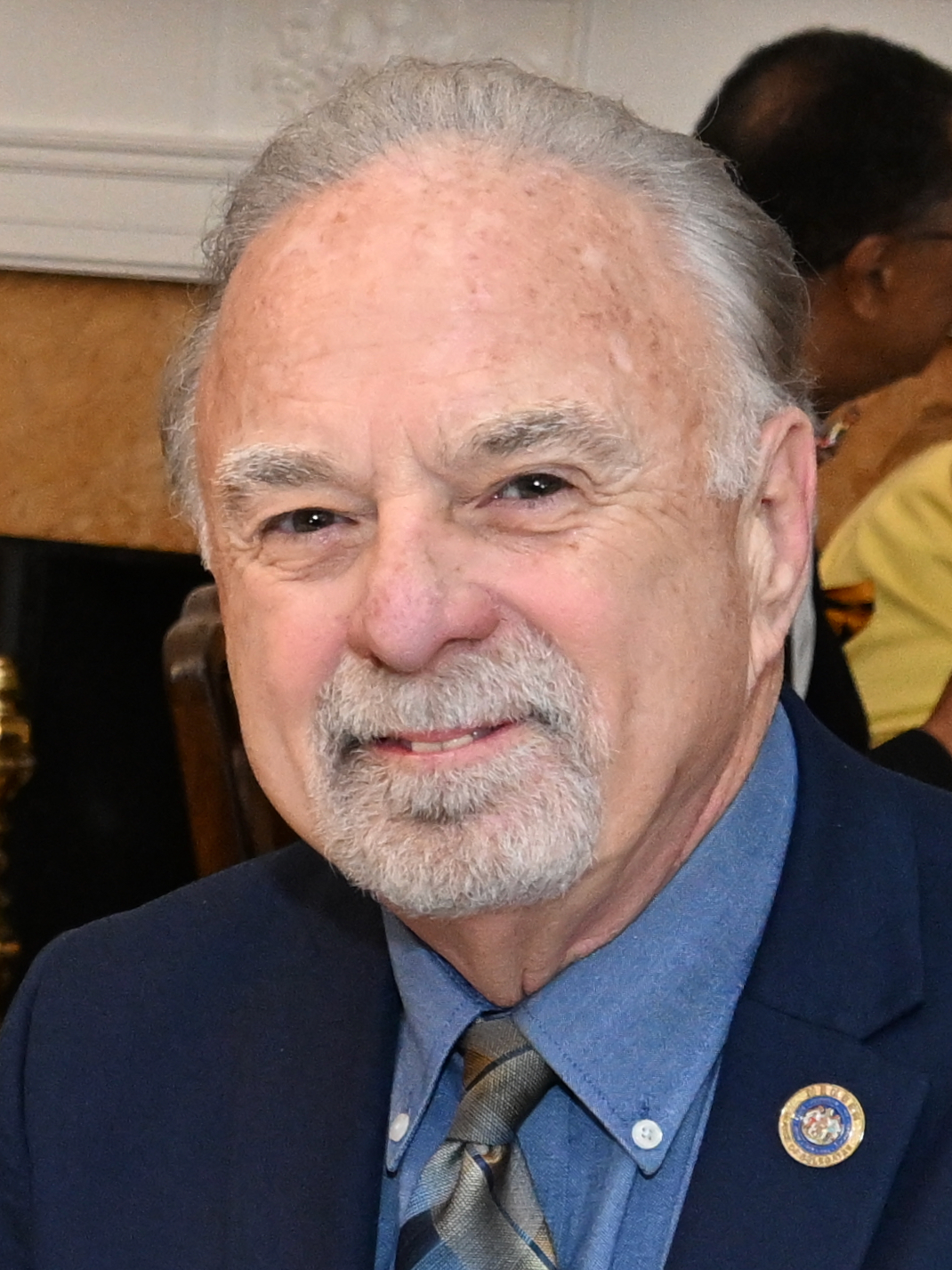
- Kerr in 2025

Member of the Maryland House of Delegates
- Incumbent
- Assumed office January 9, 2019
- Preceded by: William Folden
- Constituency: District 3B (2019–2023); 3rd district (2023–present)

Member of the Frederick County Board of Education
- In office December 7, 2016 – December 28, 2018
- Succeeded by: Lois Jarman

Personal details
- Born: January 28, 1957 (age 69) Boston, Massachusetts, U.S.
- Party: Democratic
- Children: 2
- Education: Frederick Community College (AA); Hood College (BA); Towson University (MS); Morgan State University (EdD)

Kenneth P. Kerr (born January 28, 1957) is an American politician. He is a Democratic member of the Maryland House of Delegates. He represents District 3B, which covers parts of Frederick County. He was previously a member of the Frederick County Board of Education from 2016 to 2018.

== Early life and career ==
Kerr was born in Boston, Massachusetts on January 28, 1957. He attended Frederick Community College, where he earned an A.A. degree in general studies in 1976. While at Frederick Community College, he met his wife in a philosophy class, who he married in 1984. He also attended Hood College, where he earned a B.A. degree in music in 1981. After graduating from Hood College, he worked as a fourth grade teacher for Frederick County Public Schools from 1983 to 1986. After teaching, Kerr worked in the information technology field for 10 years, working various jobs including computer repair and writing software manuals. Writing manuals made him return to Towson State University, where he earned a M.S. degree in professional writing in 1995. After graduating from Towson, Kerr worked as an English professor at Cecil College, Frederick Community College, Hagerstown Community College, Harford Community College, and Wor–Wic Community College. Since 1999, he has worked as an English professor at Frederick Community College, serving as the chair of the English department from 2011 to 2017. He later attended Morgan State University, where he earned a Ed.D. in 2003.

In 2014, Kerr unsuccessfully ran for the Frederick County Board of Education, seeking to replace board member Brad Young. He lost to incumbent April Miller in the general election by a margin of 43 votes. He declined to request a recount, saying that he trusted the proficiency of the elections officials in tallying absentee and provisional ballots.

In April 2016, Kerr again ran for the Frederick County Board of Education. During the general election, Kerr teamed up with candidates Michael Bunitsky and incumbent school board member Joy Schaefer to campaign and fundraise together and to pool funds. Kerr was victorious in the general election, receiving 25.7 percent of the vote. He was sworn in on December 7, 2016.

In January 2018, Kerr announced his candidacy for the Maryland House of Delegates, seeking to challenge Delegate William Folden. He ran unopposed in the Democratic primary. Kerr defeated Folden in the general election, earning 52.4 percent of the vote. After his general election win, Kerr resigned from the Frederick County Board of Education. The Frederick County Council voted to appoint Lois Jarman to fill his seat.

== In the legislature ==
Kerr was sworn into the Maryland House of Delegates on January 9, 2019. He served as a member of the Health and Government Operations Committee from 2019 to 2025, afterwards serving as the vice chair of the Labor, Elections, and Government Committee. Kerr is also an associate member of the Maryland Legislative Latino Caucus, as well as the Veterans Caucus.

In 2024, Kerr applied to run as a delegate to the Democratic National Convention pledged to Joe Biden, but was denied by the Maryland Democratic Party.

== Political opinions ==
=== Agriculture ===
Kerr introduced legislation in the 2020 legislative session that would allow farmers who grew malting barley and rye as cover crops to combine harvest their crops while still earning a stipend. The bill received an unfavorable report from the Environment and Transportation Committee.

=== Alcohol ===
Kerr introduced legislation in the 2021 legislative session that would allow some restaurants, bars, and taverns to continue selling alcoholic beverages that could be consumed off-site. The bill passed and became law with Governor Larry Hogan's signature on May 18, 2021.

=== Drugs ===
Kerr introduced legislation in the 2020 legislation session that would categorize kratom as among the most dangerous controlled substances in Maryland.

=== Education ===
Kerr supported legislation introduced by Delegate Kathy Afzali during the 2017 legislative session that would require schools be open for at least 1,080 hours a year, or roughly 155 full school days.

During the 2018 election, Kerr ran as "a champion for public education."

In January 2019, Kerr testified in support of a bill that would classify teachers at the Maryland School for the Deaf as state employees, rather than "at will" employees.

Kerr introduced legislation in the 2020 legislative session that would prove funding for a teacher apprenticeship program for the Frederick County Public Schools system. He also introduced a bill that would allow students to attend a nonprofit institution of higher learning at the same cost as an average four-year rate for tuition and fees for public colleges and universities through Maryland's higher education system.

Kerr introduced legislation in the 2022 legislative session that would require seizure training for teachers and other school employees. It received a favorable subcommittee report.

=== Environment ===
In March 2019, Kerr voted in favor of legislation that would ban foam takeout containers.

=== Guns ===
In February 2020, Kerr was one of seven Democrats who voted against a bill that would mandate background checks on private sales and transfers of shotguns and rifles.

=== Healthcare ===
Kerr introduced legislation in the 2019 legislative session that aims to reduce the amount that young people pay for insurance through the Maryland Health Benefit Exchange. The bill passed and went into effect without Governor Larry Hogan's signature on May 30, 2021.

In March 2019, Kerr voted in favor of a bill that would allow physicians to prescribe medication to terminally ill people, at the patient's request, to aid in their death.

=== Marijuana ===
Kerr supports the legalization of recreational marijuana. During the 2018 election, Kerr received an A-plus rating from the Maryland Cannabis Policy Coalition for his support of legalizing marijuana.

=== National politics ===
In July 2019, Kerr endorsed Joe Biden in the 2020 Democratic presidential primary. He ran as an uncommitted delegate for the 2020 Democratic National Convention.

=== Social issues ===
In October 2017, Kerr voted in favor of legislation that would allow students to use bathrooms and locker rooms according to their gender identity and provides alternatives for students uncomfortable for any reason.

=== Transportation ===
During his 2018 campaign, Kerr said that people should look at the impact that technology such as autonomous vehicles could have before building more lanes on Interstate 270.

== Electoral history ==
Frederick County Board of Education Primary Election, 2014
Party	Candidate	Votes	%
Non-Partisan	Liz Barrett	16,235	15.3%
Non-Partisan	Brad W. Young	15,830	14.9%
Non-Partisan	Colleen E. Cusimano	13,765	12.9%
Non-Partisan	April Fleming Miller	13,044	12.3%
Non-Partisan	Kenneth Kerr	12,942	12.2%
Non-Partisan	Millicent Hall	10,131	9.5%
Non-Partisan	Mike Ferrell	9,250	8.7%
Non-Partisan	Richard S. Vallaster, III	8,967	8.4%
Non-Partisan	Jonathan C. Carothers	6,270	5.9%

Frederick County Board of Education General Election, 2014
Party	Candidate	Votes	%
Non-Partisan	Liz Barrett	35,673	15.5%
Non-Partisan	Brad W. Young	32,632	14.2%
Non-Partisan	Colleen E. Cusimano	31,147	13.6%
Non-Partisan	April Fleming Miller	29,700	12.9%
Non-Partisan	Kenneth Kerr	29,657	12.9%
Non-Partisan	Mike Ferrell	26,104	11.4%
Non-Partisan	Millicent Hall	23,984	10.4%
Non-Partisan	Richard S. Vallaster, III	20,470	8.9%
Non-Partisan	Other Write-Ins	422	0.2%

Frederick County Board of Education Primary Election, 2016
Party	Candidate	Votes	%
Non-Partisan	Joy Schaefer	21,934	17.4%
Non-Partisan	Cindy Rose	18,796	14.9%
Non-Partisan	Michael G. Bunitsky	18,467	14.7%
Non-Partisan	Ken Kerr	17,337	13.8%
Non-Partisan	Shirley A. McDonald	15,270	12.1%
Non-Partisan	Lois Jarman	12,294	9.8%
Non-Partisan	Zakir Bengali	11,117	8.8%
Non-Partisan	Jay Mason	10,791	8.6%

Frederick County Board of Education General Election, 2016
Party	Candidate	Votes	%
Non-Partisan	Joy Schaefer	65,734	27.6%
Non-Partisan	Ken Kerr	61,172	25.7%
Non-Partisan	Michael G. Bunitsky	59,431	25.0%
Non-Partisan	Cindy Rose	50,157	21.1%
Non-Partisan	Other Write-Ins	1,470	0.6%

Maryland House of Delegates District 3B Democratic Primary Election, 2018
Party	Candidate	Votes	%
Democratic	Ken Kerr	2,873	100.0%

Maryland House of Delegates District 3B General Election, 2018
Party	Candidate	Votes	%
Democratic	Ken Kerr	10,091	52.4%
Republican	William "Bill" Folden	9,168	47.6%
	Other Write-Ins	13	0.1%
