= Galen R. Clagett =

American politician (born 1942)

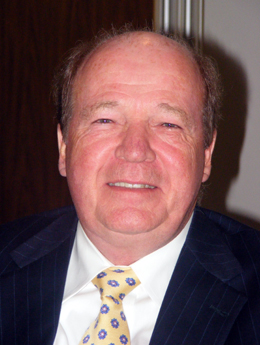

Member of the Maryland House of Delegates from the 3A district
- In office January 8, 2003 – January 14, 2015
- Preceded by: Sue Hecht
- Succeeded by: Karen Lewis Young
- Constituency: Frederick County

Frederick County Commissioner
- In office 1978–1986

Personal details
- Born: Galen Ronald Clagett; February 9, 1942 (age 84) Brunswick, Maryland
- Party: Democratic
- Education: Frostburg State University
- Occupation: Real estate

Galen R. Clagett (born February 9, 1942) is an American politician from Maryland and a member of the Democratic Party. He served three terms in the Maryland House of Delegates, representing Maryland's District 3A in Frederick County. During his tenure he was a member of the Appropriations Committee.

== Early life ==
Galen Ronald Clagett was born in Brunswick, Maryland on February 9, 1942. He attended Frostburg State University before becoming a real estate agent and President of the property management firm Clagett Enterprises, Inc.

== Legislative notes ==
- voted for the Clean Indoor Air Act of 2007 (HB359)
- voted in favor of increasing the sales tax whilst simultaneously reducing income tax rates for some income brackets - Tax Reform Act of 2007(HB2)
- voted to support in-state tuition for all graduates of a Maryland public high school, 2007(HB6)
- voted for the Maryland Gang Prosecution Act of 2007 (HB713), subjecting gang members to up to 20 years in prison and/or a fine of up to $100,000
- voted for Jessica's Law (HB 930), eliminating parole for the most violent child sexual predators and creating a mandatory minimum sentence of 25 years in state prison, 2007
- voted for Public Safety – Statewide DNA Database System – Crimes of Violence and Burglary – Post conviction (HB 370), helping to give police officers and prosecutors greater resources to solve crimes and eliminating a backlog of 24,000 unanalyzed DNA samples, leading to 192 arrests, 2008
- voted for Vehicle Laws – Repeated Drunk and Drugged Driving Offenses – Suspension of License (HB 293), strengthening Maryland's drunk driving laws by imposing a mandatory one year license suspension for a person convicted of drunk driving more than once in five years, 2009
- voted for HB 102, creating the House Emergency Medical Services System Workgroup, leading to Maryland's budgeting of $52 million to fund three new Medevac helicopters to replace the State's aging fleet, 2009
- voted to raise income taxes on single filers earning more than $100,000 and joint filers earning more than $150,000, 2012

== Election results ==
- 2006 Race for Maryland House of Delegates – District 3A

Voters to choose two:

Name	Votes	Percent	Outcome
Galen R. Clagett, Dem.	12,422	25.7%	Won
Sue Hecht, Dem.	13,900	28.7%	Won
Patrick N. Hogan, Rep.	12,163	25.1%	Lost
Linda Naylor, Rep.	9,873	20.4%	Lost
Other Write-Ins	32	0.1%	Lost

- 2002 Race for Maryland House of Delegates – District 3A

Voters to choose two:

Name	Votes	Percent	Outcome
Patrick N. Hogan, Rep.	12,066	26.4%	Won
Galen R. Clagett, Dem.	11,434	25.0%	Won
Dick Zimmerman, Dem.	11,288	24.7%	Lost
Timothy W. Brooks, Rep.	10,782	23.6%	Lost
Other Write-Ins	168	0.4%	Lost
Ron Bird, Dem.	4	0.0%	Lost
