= Maryland Legislative District 3 =

American legislative district

Maryland's legislative district 3
- Represents part of Frederick County
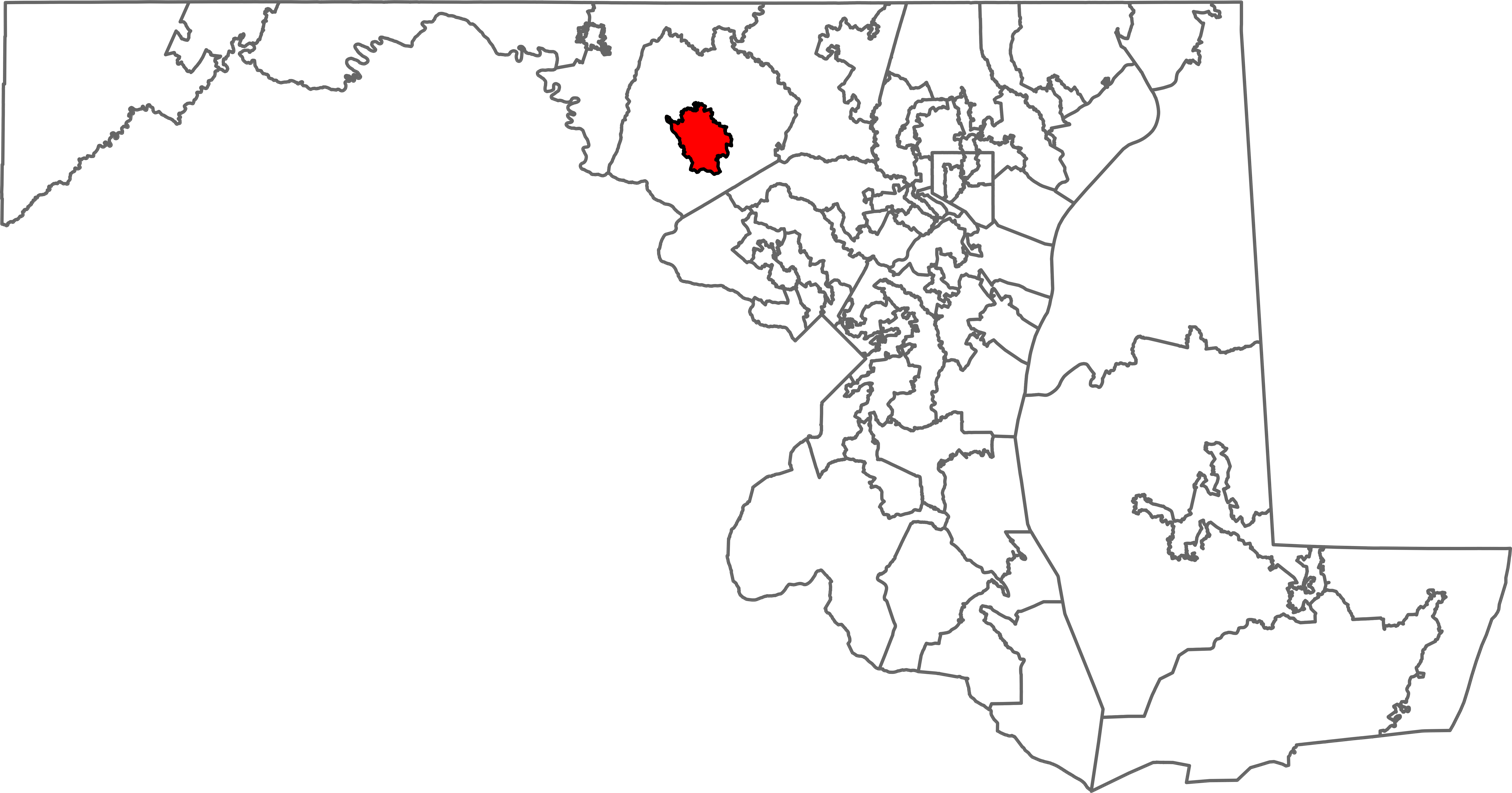
- Senator: Karen Lewis Young (D)
- Delegate(s): Kenneth P. Kerr (D); Kris Fair (D); Karen Simpson (D)
- Registration: 46.3% Democratic; 29.3% Republican; 23.3% unaffiliated
- Demographics: 59.0% White; 15.5% Black/African American; 0.6% Native American; 6.0% Asian; 0.0% Hawaiian/Pacific Islander; 8.1% Other race; 10.7% Two or more races; 16.6% Hispanic
- Population (2022): 143,766
- Voting-age population: 110,187
- Registered voters: 98,230

Maryland Legislative District 3 is one of 47 districts in the state for the Maryland General Assembly. It covers part of Frederick County. Three delegates represent the district in the Maryland House of Delegates. Up until the 2020 United States redistricting cycle, the district was divided into two sub-districts for the Maryland House of Delegates: District 3A and District 3B.

== Demographic characteristics ==
As of the 2020 United States census, the district had a population of 143,766, of whom 110,187 (76.6%) were of voting age. The racial makeup of the district was 84,892 (59.0%) White, 22,308 (15.5%) African American, 809 (0.6%) Native American, 8,652 (6.0%) Asian, 53 (0.0%) Pacific Islander, 11,644 (8.1%) from some other race, and 15,341 (10.7%) from two or more races. Hispanic or Latino of any race were 23,875 (16.6%) of the population.

The district had 93,691 registered voters as of October 17, 2020, of whom 21,788 (23.3%) were registered as unaffiliated, 27,442 (29.3%) were registered as Republicans, 43,356 (46.3%) were registered as Democrats, and 425 (0.5%) were registered to other parties.

== Political representation ==
The district is represented for the 2023–2027 legislative term in the State Senate by Karen Lewis Young (D) and in the House of Delegates by Kris Fair (D), Karen Simpson (D) and Kenneth P. Kerr (D).

== Election history ==
=== Multi-member Senate district (1967–1975) ===
Year	District 3-A		District 3-B		District 3-C
1967	Thomas M. Anderson Jr.	Louise Gore	Blair Lee III	Margaret Schweinhaut	James Clark Jr.
1968	Thomas M. Anderson Jr.	Louise Gore	Blair Lee III	Margaret Schweinhaut	James Clark Jr.
1969	Thomas M. Anderson Jr.	Louise Gore	Victor Crawford	Margaret Schweinhaut	James Clark Jr.
1970	Thomas M. Anderson Jr.	Louise Gore	Victor Crawford	Margaret Schweinhaut	James Clark Jr.
1971	James S. McAuliffe Jr.	Newton Steers	Victor Crawford	Margaret Schweinhaut	James Clark Jr.
1972	James S. McAuliffe Jr.	Newton Steers	Victor Crawford	Margaret Schweinhaut	James Clark Jr.
1973	James S. McAuliffe Jr.	Newton Steers	Victor Crawford	Margaret Schweinhaut	James Clark Jr.
1974	James S. McAuliffe Jr.	Newton Steers	Victor Crawford	Margaret Schweinhaut	James Clark Jr.

=== Single-member Senate district (1975–present) ===
Years	Senator	Party	Electoral history
January 13, 1971 – March 1, 1983	Edward P. Thomas Jr.	Republican	Redistricted from the 2nd district and re-elected in 1974. Re-elected in 1978. Re-elected in 1982. Died.
March 26, 1983 – January 13, 1999	John W. Derr	Republican	Appointed to finish Thomas's term. Elected in 1986. Re-elected in 1990. Re-elected in 1994. Lost renomination.
January 13, 1999 – January 12, 2011	Alex Mooney	Republican	Elected in 1998. Re-elected in 2002. Re-elected in 2006. Lost re-election.
January 12, 2011 – January 11, 2023	Ronald N. Young	Democratic	Elected in 2010. Re-elected in 2014. Re-elected in 2018. Retired.
January 11, 2023 – present	Karen Lewis Young	Democratic	Elected in 2022. Re-elected in 2026.
