= Meagan Simonaire =

American politician from Maryland

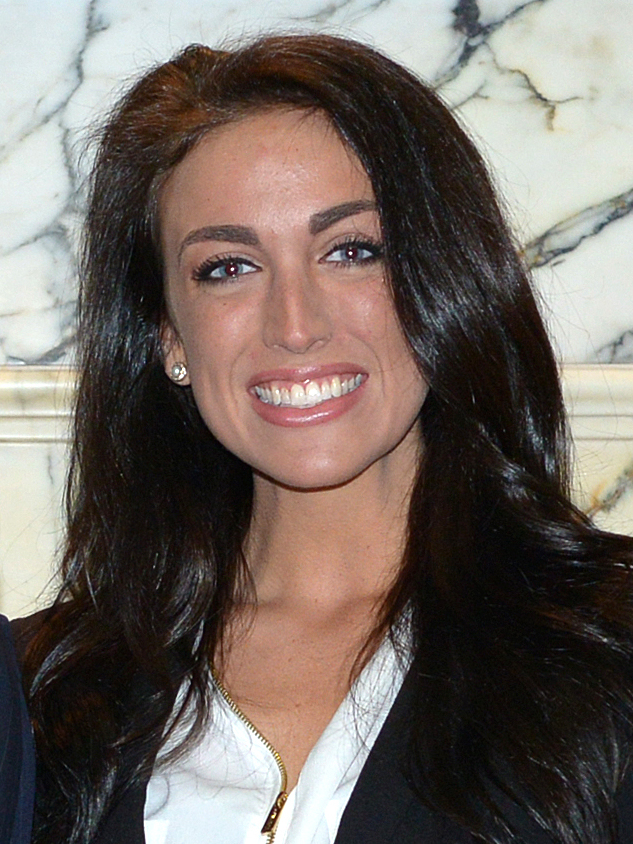
- Simonaire in 2015

Member of the Maryland House of Delegates from the 31B district
- In office January 14, 2015 – January 9, 2019
- Preceded by: Don H. Dwyer Jr.
- Succeeded by: Brian Chisholm

Personal details
- Born: August 18, 1990 (age 36) Pasadena, Maryland
- Party: Democratic (since 2018)
- Other political affiliations: Republican (before 2018)
- Parent: Bryan Simonaire (father)
- Education: Bob Jones University

Meagan C. Simonaire (born August 8, 1990) is a former American politician from Maryland and was the youngest member of the Maryland General Assembly. She represented House District 31B (which includes Pasadena and portions of Glen Burnie, Millersville and Severna Park) in the Maryland House of Delegates from 2014 to 2018. She is the daughter of Maryland State Senator Bryan Simonaire.

== Early life ==
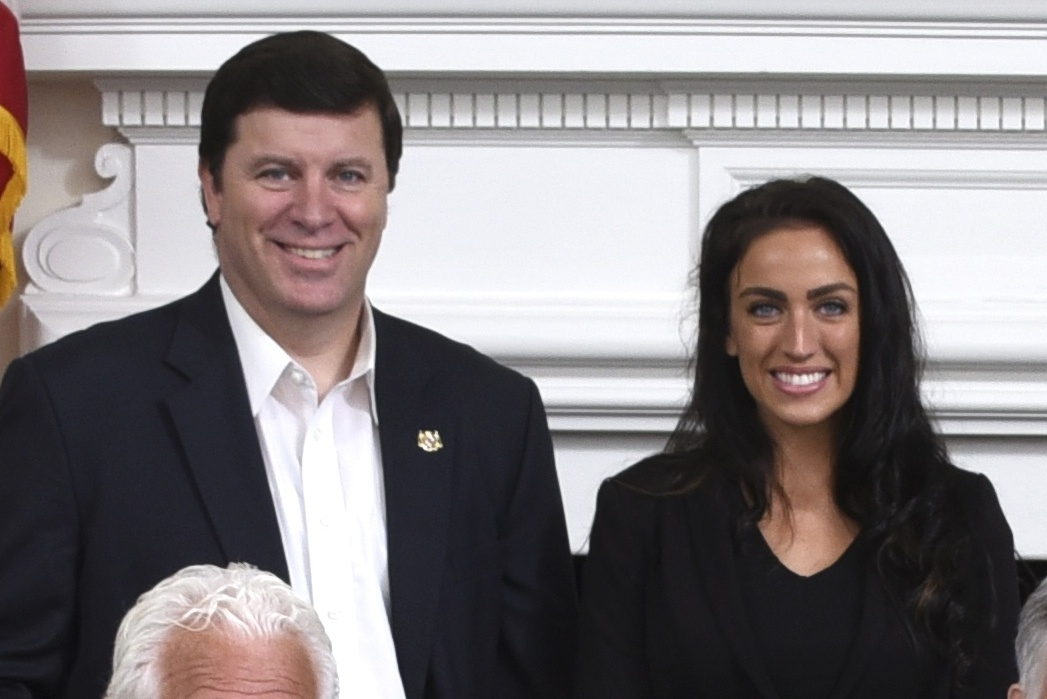
Meagan and her father in the legislature, 2015

Simonaire is the third of seven brothers and sisters, and spent most of her childhood in the Middle East where her father worked as an engineer for Northrop Grumman.

After she moved to the U.S., she attended Bob Jones University in South Carolina to study cosmetology.

== Political career ==
=== Maryland House of Delegates ===
Simonaire was elected to the House of Delegates in 2014 to one of the two seats in House District 31B. After a competitive primary, Simonaire beat out several other candidates to win a seat alongside then House Minority Leader Nic Kipke, replacing incumbent Don Dwyer who was defeated after a string of legal issues.

==== Views on conversion therapy ====
Simonaire publicly came out as bisexual in April 2018 while supporting a bill banning conversion therapy for LGBT teens. In a speech on the House floor, she claimed her parents suggested conversion therapy after she came out to them in January 2015. Her father, Senator Bryan Simonaire, disputed her story and continued to oppose the bill. The bill was ultimately passed by both the House of Delegates and Senate.

Elected as a Republican, Simonaire joined the Democratic Party on October 15, 2018.

== Personal life ==
Simonaire chose not to run for reelection in 2018 and retired from elected office due to her changing views. She is working as a cosmetic tattoo artist, specializing in eyebrow tattooing. She provides free services to burn patients, cancer patients, domestic violence survivors, and human trafficking survivors.

== Electoral history ==
- 2014 Republican Primary Election for Maryland House of Delegates – District 31B

Voters to choose two:

Name	Votes	Percent	Outcome
Nic Kipke, Rep.	3,920	31.00%	Won
Meagan Simonaire, Rep.	3,075	24.30%	Won
Gus Kurtz, Rep.	1,779	14.10%	Lost
Brian A. Chisholm, Rep.	1,607	12.70%	Lost
Faith M. Loudon, Rep.	1,017	8.10%	Lost
Don Dwyer, Jr., Rep.	890	7.00%	Lost
Paul William Drgos, Jr., Rep.	230	1.80%	Lost
David Lee Therrien, Rep.	111	0.90%	Lost

- 2014 Race for Maryland House of Delegates – 31B District

Voters to choose two:

Name	Votes	Percent	Outcome
Nic Kipke, Republican	20,858	39.9%	Won
Meagan C. Simonaire, Republican	19,555	37.4%	Won
Jeremiah Chiappelli, Democratic	6,332	12.1%	Lost
Doug Morris, Democratic	5,394	10.3%	Lost
Other Write-Ins	88	0.2%	
