= Frederick Community College =

Community college in Frederick, Maryland, U.S.

- Motto: Avec progres marchons en avant
- Motto in English: Let us move forward with progress
- Type: Public community college
- Established: 1957; 69 years ago
- Accreditation: MSCHE
- President: Annesa Cheek
- Students: 5,389
- Location: Frederick, Maryland, United States; 39°27′8″N 77°25′3″W
- Campus: 97 acres (39 ha)
- Newspaper: The Commuter
- Colors: Green and gold
- Sporting affiliations: MD JUCO
- Mascot: Cougar
- Website: www.frederick.edu

Frederick Community College (FCC) is a public community college in Frederick, Maryland.

== Presidents ==
Years of Service	Name	Title
2022–present	Annesa Cheek	President
2021–2022	Thomas Powell	Interim President
2014–2021	Elizabeth Burmaster	President
2013–2014	Douglas Browning	President
2012–2013	Frederico "F.J." Talley	President
2005–2011	Carol Eaton	President
1998–2005	Patricia Stanley	President
1986–1997	Lee J. Betts	President
1979–1986	Jack B. Kussmaul	President
1978–1979	Lewis O. Turner	President
1967–1978	Lewis Stephens	President
1957–1967	Duval W. Sweadner	President

== Campus ==
The FCC campus has moved several times over the years. Originally the campus was within what is now Frederick High School. It was moved to its current 97 acre location (7932 Opossumtown Pike, Frederick MD 21702) in 1970.

FCC has campus security on campus 24 hours a day.

The Jack B. Kussmaul Theater – Arts Center is a cultural resource center that hosts music performances, art exhibitions, and educational programs for the college and the community.

=== Library ===
The Frederick Community College library is part of the Bess and Frank Gladhill Learning Commons, opened in January 2016 as a flexible research and learning space that provides library resources, academic support services, study spaces, and technology to students and community members.

=== Early College ===
Graduates of Early College at FCC will earn an associate degree and high school diploma simultaneously by attending FCC full-time during their junior and senior years. The program was created to increase participation and completion of students from historically underrepresented populations in higher education, and is open to all FCPS high school students.

== Academics ==
FCC has over 85 different degree and continuing education programs.

=== Emergency Management ===
FCC offers Letters of Recognition, a Certificate, and an Associate of Applied Science degree in Emergency Management supported by FEMA's Emergency Management Institute Independent Study courses.

== Athletics ==
The athletic department offers eight intercollegiate sports including men's baseball, basketball, golf and soccer and women's basketball, volleyball, softball and soccer.
