= 2022 Maryland Senate election =

- November 8, 2022

All 47 seats of the Maryland Senate 24 seats needed for a majority
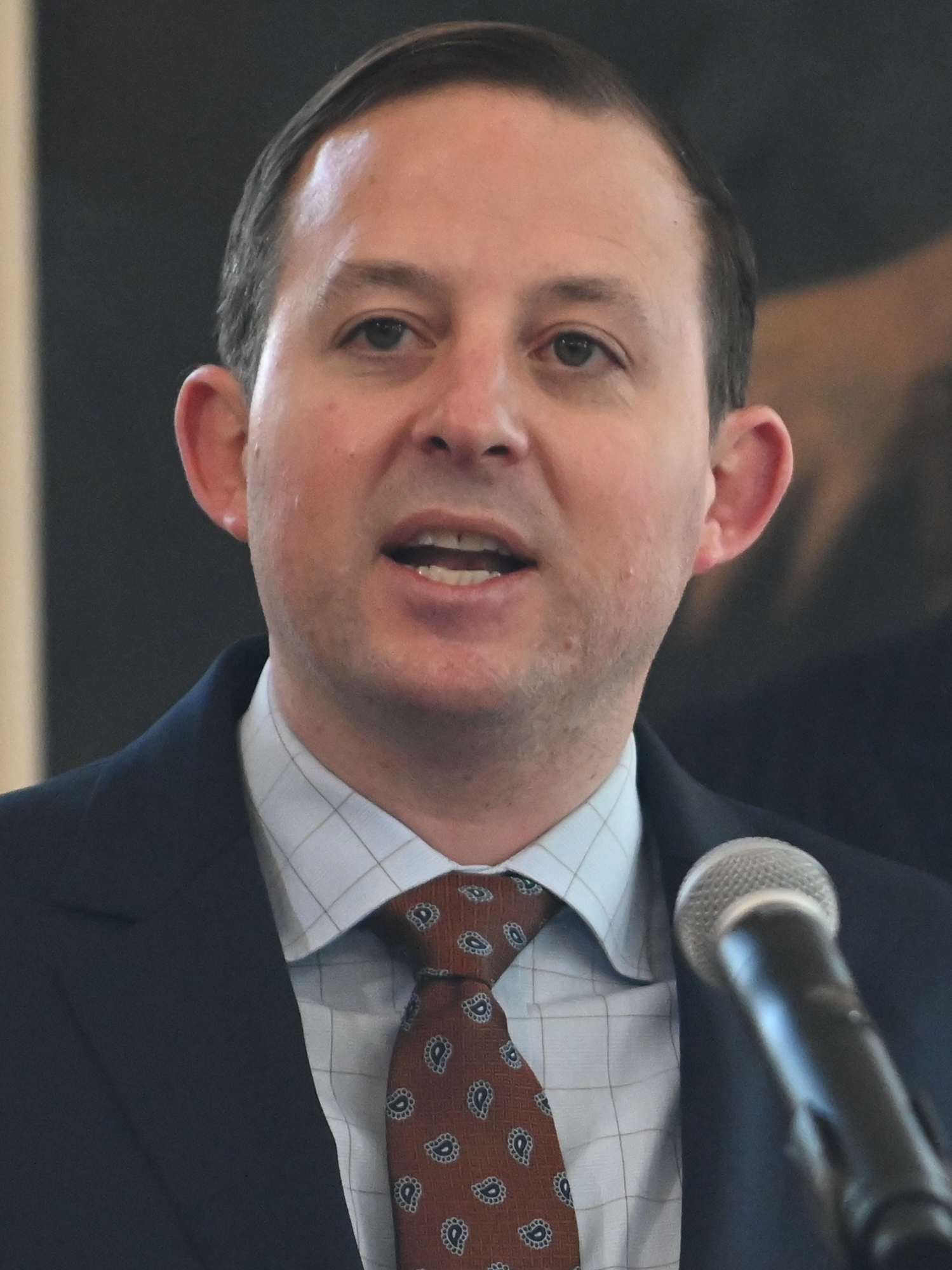

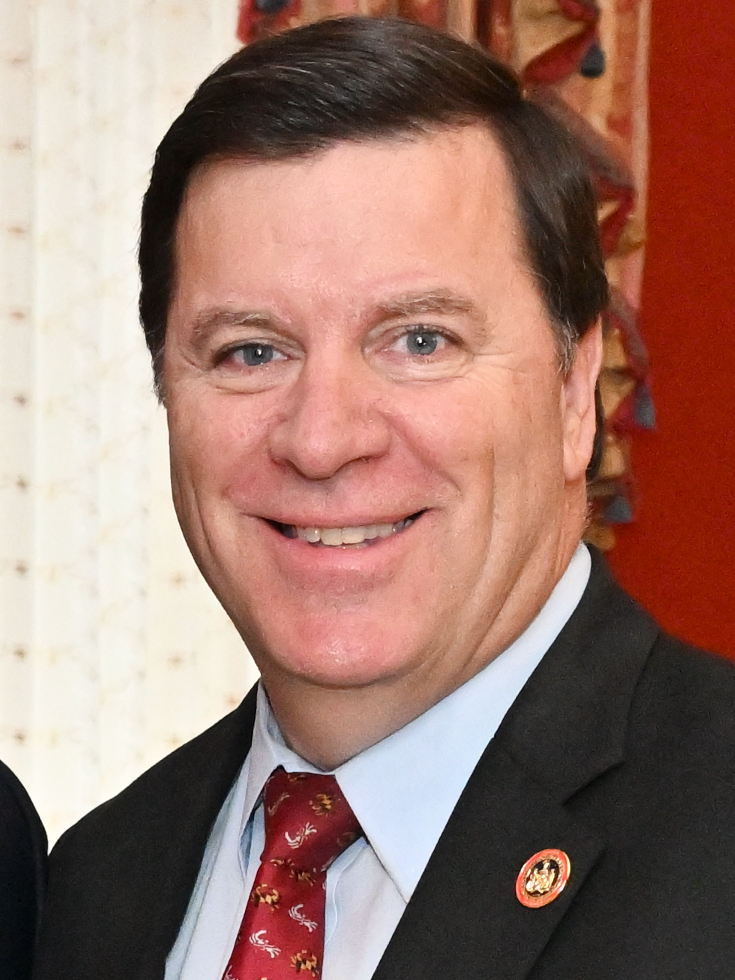
	Majority party	Minority party
Leader	Bill Ferguson	Bryan Simonaire
Party	Democratic	Republican
Leader since	January 8, 2020	October 10, 2020
Leader's seat	46th district	31st district
Seats before	32	15
Seats won	34	13
Seat change	▲2	▼2
Popular vote	1,120,385	692,099
Percentage	60.54%	37.40%
Swing	▼4.36%	▲4.10%
- Democratic gain Democratic hold Republican hold Democratic: 50–60% 60-70% 70–80% 80–90% >90% Republican: 50–60% 60–70% 70–80% >90%
President before election
Bill Ferguson
Democratic
President
Bill Ferguson
Democratic

The 2022 Maryland Senate election were held on November 8, 2022, to elect senators in all 47 districts of the Maryland Senate. Members were elected in single-member constituencies to four-year terms. These elections were held concurrently with various federal and state elections, including for governor of Maryland. The Democratic and Republican primaries were held on July 19, 2022.

Democrats gained two seats, increasing their supermajority to 34 out of 47 seats. Simultaneously with gains in the state house and Wes Moore's win in the gubernatorial race, Democrats won a trifecta in the state for the first time since 2010.

== Background ==
The Democratic Party had held majority control of the Senate since the beginning of the 20th century. The closest that the Republican Party had come to gaining control since then was in 1918, when Democrats held a thin 14 to 13 majority. Although Republicans had controlled the governorship since 2015, Democrats maintained a veto-proof supermajority of three-fifths in the 2014 and 2018 elections.

In the 2022 elections, Governor Larry Hogan was term-limited and Democrats assembled a large field of candidates to reclaim the office. The party retained its majority in the General Assembly, successfully retook the governor's office, and re-established a government trifecta.

== Predictions ==
Source	Ranking	As of
Sabato's Crystal Ball	Safe D	May 19, 2022

== Overview ==
Party	Candidates	Votes		Seats		
Party	Candidates	No.	%	Before	After	+/–
Democratic	61	1,120,385	60.54%	32	34	▲2
Republican	51	692,099	37.40%	15	13	▼2
Libertarian	2	15,657	0.85%	0	0	
Green	2	4,305	0.23%	0	0	
Total		1,850,511	100.00	47	47	

=== Summary by district ===
District	Incumbent	Party	Elected Senator	Party
1st	George C. Edwards	Rep	Mike McKay	Rep
2nd	Paul D. Corderman (Note: Corderman was appointed on September 1, 2020, to succeed Republican Andrew A. Serafini, who resigned on August 1, 2020.)	Rep	Paul D. Corderman	Rep
3rd	Ronald N. Young	Dem	Karen Lewis Young	Dem
4th	Michael Hough	Rep	William Folden	Rep
5th	Justin Ready	Rep	Justin Ready (Note: Running unopposed in the general election.)	Rep
6th	Johnny Ray Salling	Rep	Johnny Ray Salling	Rep
7th	J. B. Jennings	Rep	J. B. Jennings	Rep
8th	Kathy Klausmeier	Dem	Kathy Klausmeier	Dem
9th	Katie Fry Hester	Dem	Katie Fry Hester	Dem
10th	Delores G. Kelley	Dem	Benjamin Brooks	Dem
11th	Shelly L. Hettleman (Note: Hettleman was appointed on January 3, 2020, to succeed Democrat Robert Zirkin, who resigned on January 1, 2020.)	Dem	Shelly L. Hettleman	Dem
12th	Clarence Lam	Dem	Clarence Lam	Dem
13th	Guy Guzzone	Dem	Guy Guzzone	Dem
14th	Craig Zucker	Dem	Craig Zucker	Dem
15th	Brian Feldman	Dem	Brian Feldman	Dem
16th	Susan C. Lee	Dem	Susan C. Lee	Dem
17th	Cheryl Kagan	Dem	Cheryl Kagan	Dem
18th	Jeff Waldstreicher	Dem	Jeff Waldstreicher	Dem
19th	Benjamin F. Kramer	Dem	Benjamin F. Kramer	Dem
20th	William C. Smith Jr.	Dem	William C. Smith Jr.	Dem
21st	James Rosapepe	Dem	James Rosapepe	Dem
22nd	Paul G. Pinsky	Dem	Paul G. Pinsky	Dem
23rd	Ron Watson (Note: Watson was appointed on August 31, 2021, to succeed Democrat Douglas J. J. Peters, who resigned on July 31, 2021, after he was appointed to the University System of Maryland Board of Regents.)	Dem	Ron Watson	Dem
24th	Joanne C. Benson	Dem	Joanne C. Benson	Dem
25th	Melony G. Griffith	Dem	Melony G. Griffith	Dem
26th	Obie Patterson	Dem	C. Anthony Muse	Dem
27th	Michael A. Jackson (Note: Jackson was appointed on January 13, 2021, to succeed Democrat Thomas V. Miller Jr., who resigned on December 23, 2020.)	Dem	Michael A. Jackson	Dem
28th	Arthur Ellis	Dem	Arthur Ellis	Dem
29th	Jack Bailey	Rep	Jack Bailey	Rep
30th	Sarah Elfreth	Dem	Sarah Elfreth	Dem
31st	Bryan Simonaire	Rep	Bryan Simonaire	Rep
32nd	Pamela Beidle	Dem	Pamela Beidle	Dem
33rd	Edward R. Reilly	Rep	Dawn Gile	Dem
34th	Robert Cassilly	Rep	Mary-Dulany James	Dem
35th	Jason C. Gallion	Rep	Jason C. Gallion	Rep
36th	Steve Hershey	Rep	Steve Hershey	Rep
37th	Adelaide C. Eckardt	Rep	Johnny Mautz	Rep
38th	Mary Beth Carozza	Rep	Mary Beth Carozza	Rep
39th	Nancy J. King	Dem	Nancy J. King	Dem
40th	Antonio Hayes	Dem	Antonio Hayes	Dem
41st	Jill P. Carter	Dem	Jill P. Carter	Dem
42nd	Chris West	Rep	Chris West	Rep
43rd	Mary L. Washington	Dem	Mary L. Washington	Dem
44th	Charles E. Sydnor III (Note: Sydnor was appointed on January 8, 2020, to succeed Democrat Shirley Nathan-Pulliam, who resigned on December 1, 2019.)	Dem	Charles E. Sydnor III	Dem
45th	Cory V. McCray	Dem	Cory V. McCray	Dem
46th	Bill Ferguson	Dem	Bill Ferguson	Dem
47th	Malcolm Augustine	Dem	Malcolm Augustine	Dem

=== Closest races ===
Seats where the margin of victory was under 10%:

1. State Senate district 34, 1.31% (gain)

== Retiring incumbents ==
=== Democrats ===
1. District 3: Ronald N. Young retired.
2. District 10: Delores G. Kelley retired.
3. District 26: Obie Patterson retired.

=== Republicans ===
1. District 1: George C. Edwards retired.
2. District 4: Michael Hough retired to run for Frederick County executive.
3. District 33: Edward R. Reilly retired.
4. District 34: Robert Cassilly retired to run for Harford County executive.

== Incumbents defeated ==
=== In primary elections ===
==== Republicans ====
1. District 37: Adelaide Eckardt lost renomination to Johnny Mautz.

== Detailed results ==
=== District 1 ===
2022 Maryland Senate 1st District election
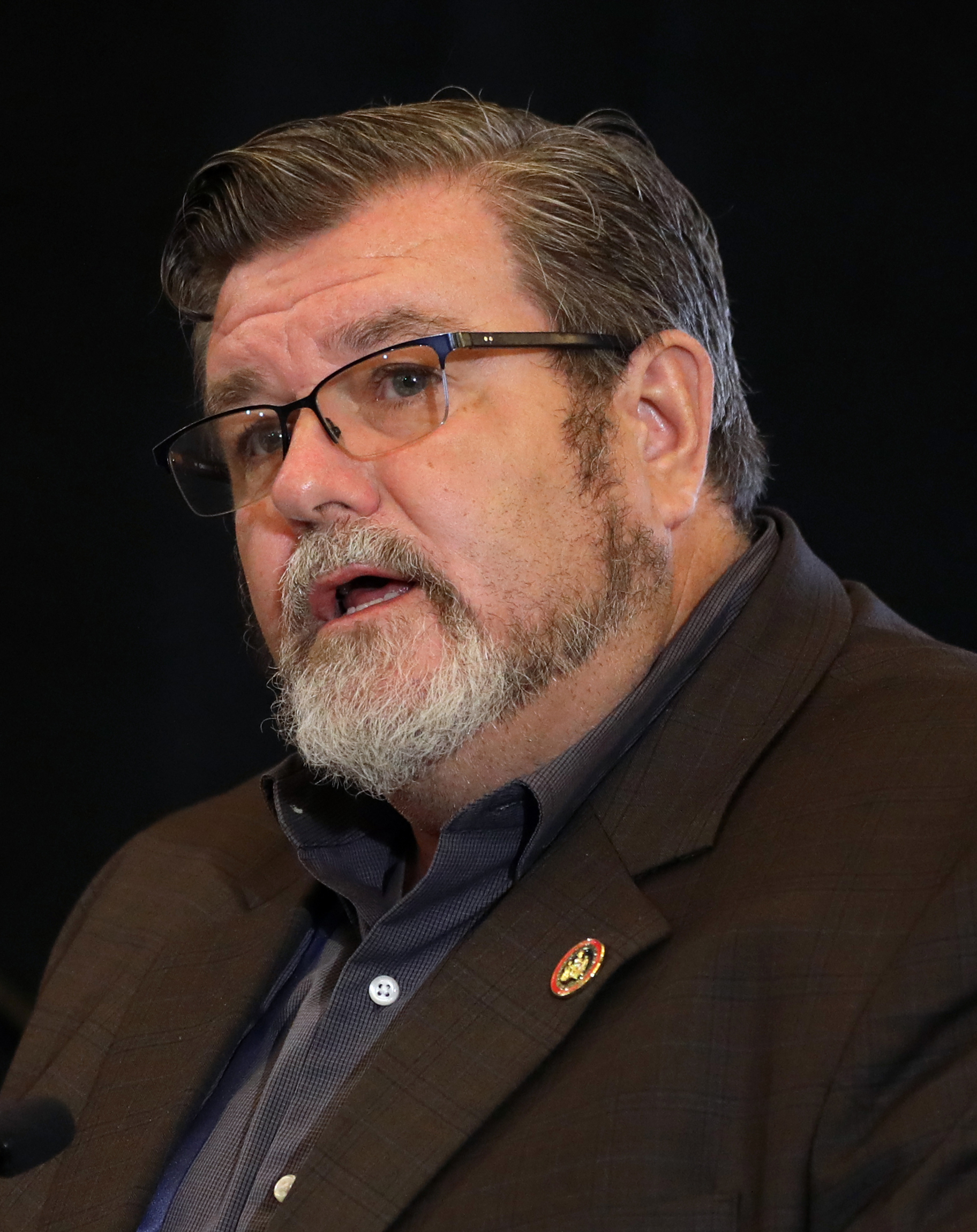

Candidate	Mike McKay	Michael Dreisbach
Party	Republican	Democratic
Popular vote	33,258	11,995
Percentage	73.4%	26.5%
- Precinct results McKay: 50–60% 60–70% 70–80% 80–90% Dreisbach: 40–50%
State senator before election
George C. Edwards
Republican
Elected State senator
Mike McKay
Republican

The new 1st district encompasses all of Garrett and Allegany counties and west Washington County. Four-term Republican incumbent George C. Edwards, who was re-elected in 2018 with 98.3% of the vote, announced on July 14, 2021, that he would not run for re-election to a fifth term.

==== Republican primary ====
Maryland Matters identified the Republican primary election in District 1 as a "race to watch".

Republican primary results
Party	Candidate	Votes	%
Republican	Mike McKay	9,265	55.0
Republican	Jake Shade	7,581	45.0
Total votes		16,846	100.0

==== General election ====
2022 Maryland's 1st Senate district election
Party	Candidate	Votes	%	±%
Republican	Mike McKay	33,258	73.37%	−24.96%
Democratic	Michael Dreisbach	11,995	26.46%	N/A
Write-in		78	0.17%	-1.50%
Total votes		45,331	100.00%	
Republican hold				

=== District 2 ===
2022 Maryland Senate 2nd District election
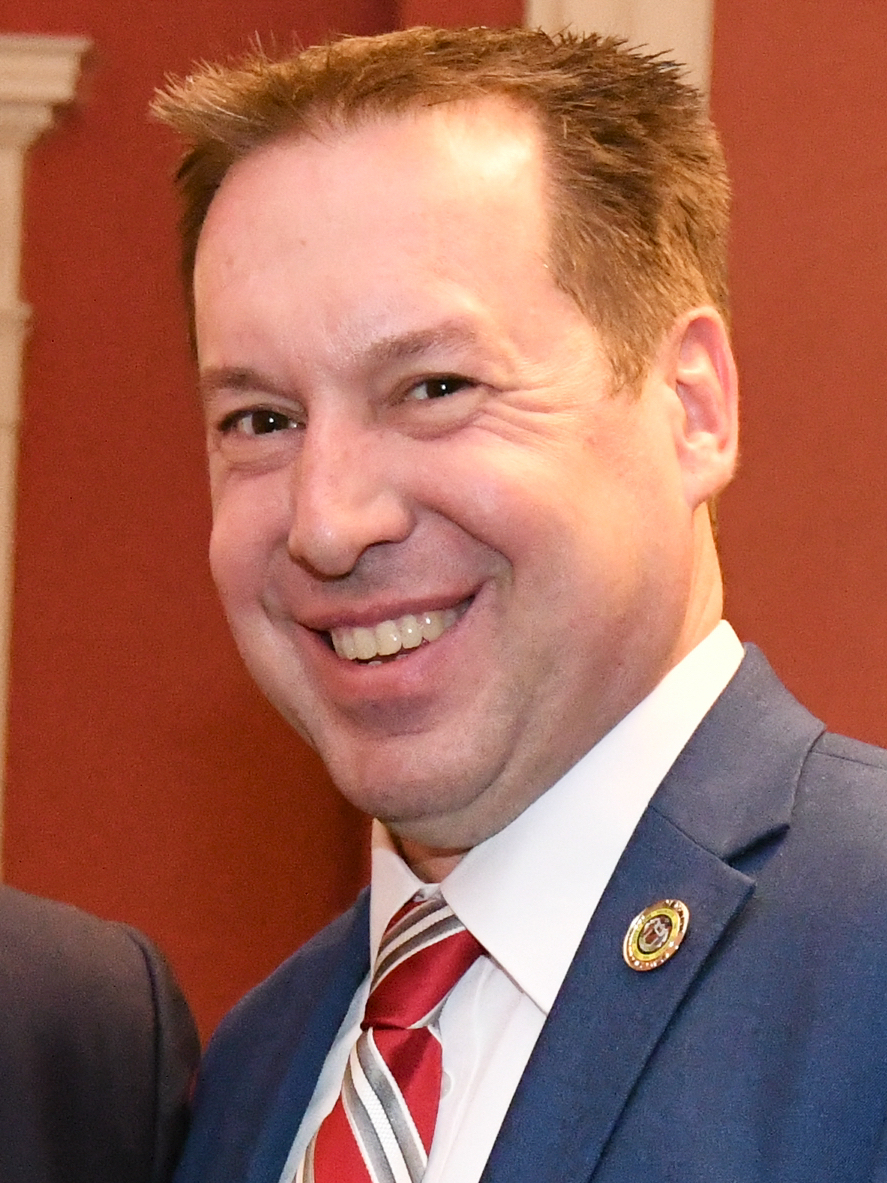

Candidate	Paul D. Corderman	Shawn Demetrious Perry
Party	Republican	Democratic
Popular vote	25,881	14,629
Percentage	63.8%	36.1%
- Precinct results Corderman: 50–60% 60–70% 70–80% Perry: 50–60% 60–70% 70–80%
State senator before election
Paul D. Corderman
Republican
Elected State senator
Paul D. Corderman
Republican

The new 2nd district encompasses east Washington County, including Hagerstown, and north Frederick County. Republican incumbent Paul D. Corderman ran for a full term after being appointed to the seat on September 1, 2020, following the resignation of Andrew A. Serafini, who was re-elected in 2018 with 71.7% of the vote.

2022 Maryland's 2nd Senate district election
Party	Candidate	Votes	%	±%
Republican	Paul D. Corderman (incumbent)	25,881	63.84%	−7.81%
Democratic	Shawn Demetrious Perry	14,629	36.08%	N/A
Write-in		32	0.08%	-0.30%
Total votes		40,542	100.00%	
Republican hold				

=== District 3 ===
2022 Maryland Senate 3rd District election
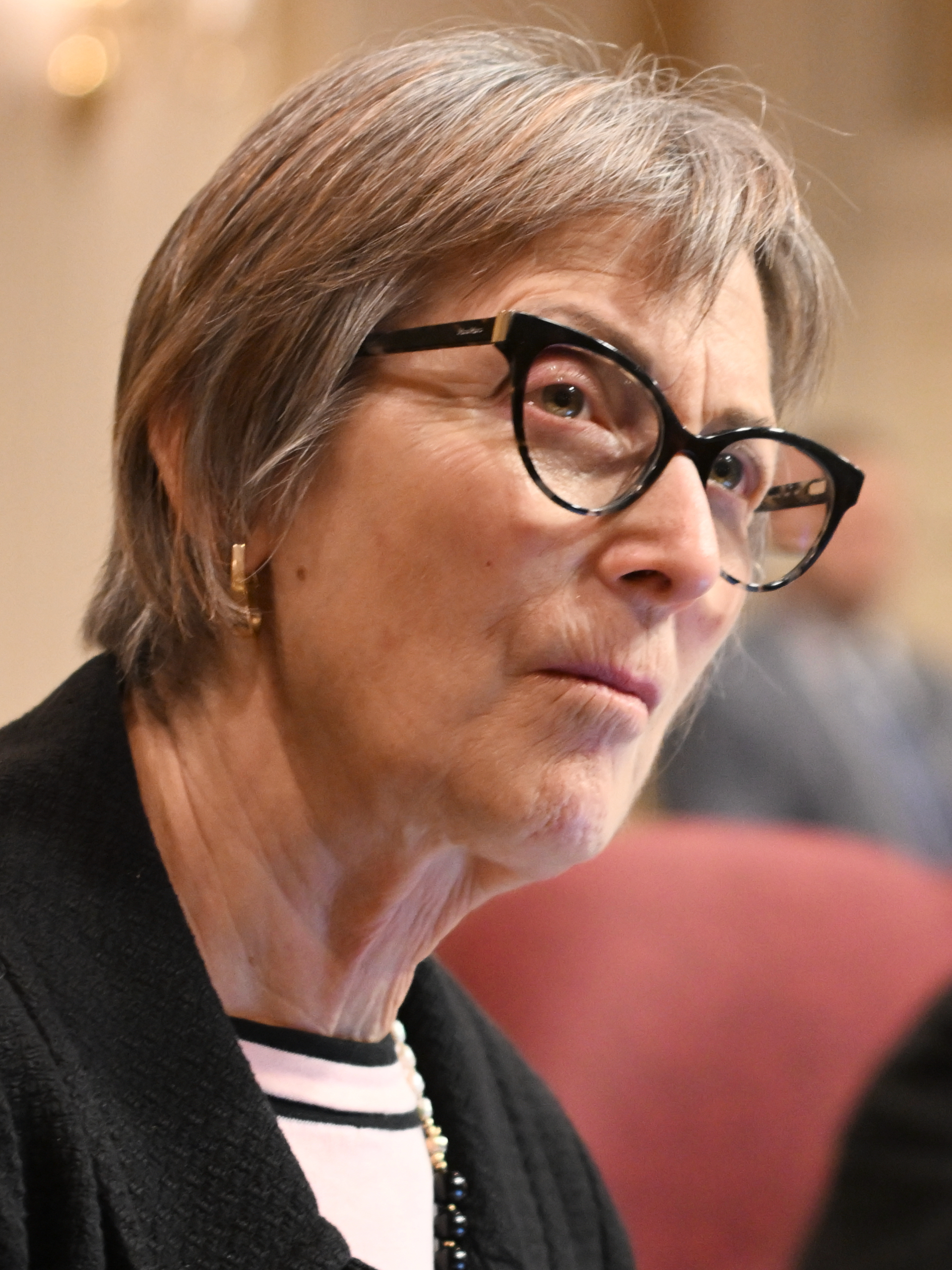

Candidate	Karen Lewis Young	Angela McIntosh
Party	Democratic	Republican
Popular vote	27,446	13,774
Percentage	66.5%	33.4%
- Precinct results Young: 50–60% 60–70% 70–80% McIntosh: 60–70% 70–80% Tie: 50%
State senator before election
Ronald N. Young
Democratic
Elected State senator
Karen Lewis Young
Democratic

The new 3rd district encompasses the city of Frederick. Three-term Democratic incumbent Ronald N. Young, who was re-elected in 2018 with 58.5% of the vote, announced on November 8, 2021, that he would not run for re-election to a fourth term.

==== Democratic primary ====
Maryland Matters identified the Democratic primary election in District 3 as a "race to watch".

Democratic primary results
Party	Candidate	Votes	%
Democratic	Karen Lewis Young	8,128	71.0
Democratic	Jay Mason	3,327	29.0
Total votes		11,455	100.0

==== General election ====
2022 Maryland's 3rd Senate district election
Party	Candidate	Votes	%	±%
Democratic	Karen Lewis Young	27,446	66.48%	+8.01%
Republican	Angela Ariel McIntosh	13,774	33.36%	−7.95%
Write-in		67	0.16%	-0.06%
Total votes		41,287	100.00%	
Democratic hold				

=== District 4 ===
2022 Maryland Senate 4th District election
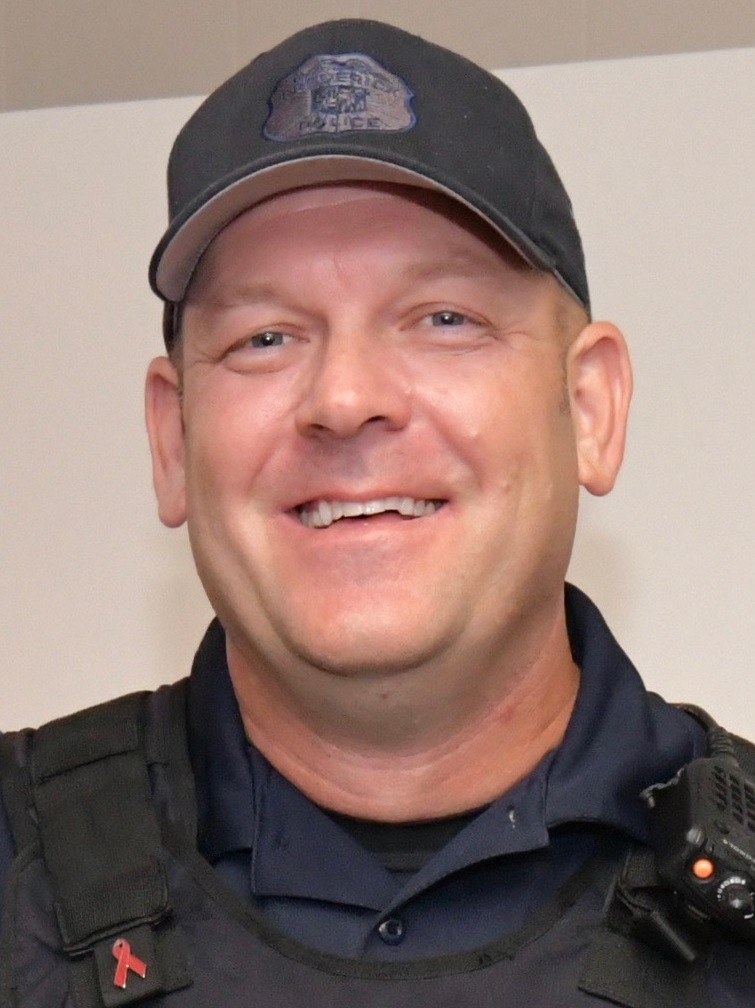

Candidate	William Folden	Carleah Summers
Party	Republican	Democratic
Popular vote	27,446	23,967
Percentage	57.5%	42.4%
- Precinct results Folden: 50–60% 60–70% 70–80% Summers: 40–50% 50–60% 60–70% >90% Tie: 50%
State senator before election
Michael Hough
Republican
Elected State senator
William Folden
Republican

The new 4th district encompasses most of Frederick County. Two-term Republican incumbent Michael Hough, who was re-elected in 2018 with 59.1% of the vote, announced on May 17, 2021, that he would run for Frederick County executive instead of seeking a third term.

==== Republican primary ====
Republican primary results
Party	Candidate	Votes	%
Republican	William Folden	9,060	71.8
Republican	Stephen Barrett	3,553	28.2
Total votes		12,613	100.0

==== General election ====
2022 Maryland's 4th Senate district election
Party	Candidate	Votes	%	±%
Republican	William Folden	32,554	57.54%	−1.54%
Democratic	Carleah M. Summers	23,967	42.36%	+1.52%
Write-in		60	0.11%	+0.03%
Total votes		56,581	100.00%	
Republican hold				

=== District 5 ===
2022 Maryland Senate 5th District election
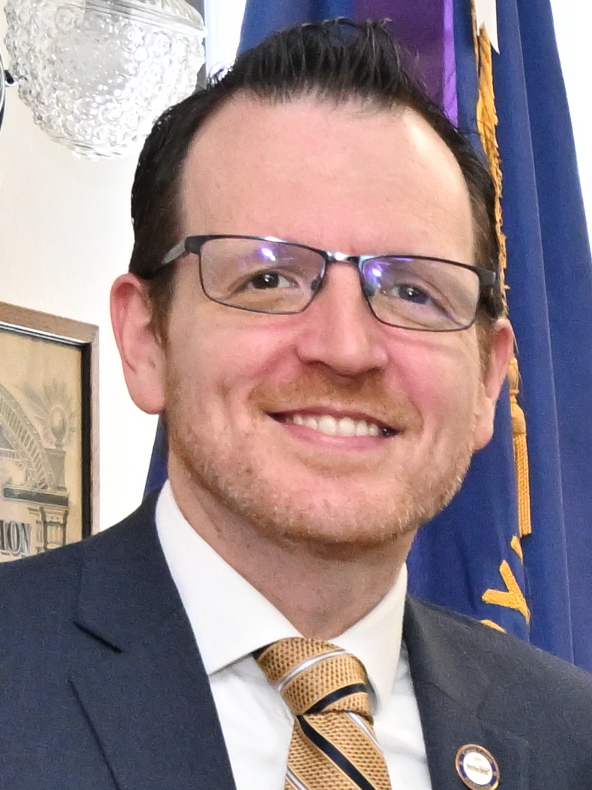
Candidate	Justin Ready
Party	Republican
Popular vote	39,484
Percentage	96.1%
- Precinct results Ready: >90%
State senator before election
Justin Ready
Republican
Elected State senator
Justin Ready
Republican

The new 5th district encompasses most of Carroll County, including Eldersburg and Westminster. Two-term Republican incumbent Justin Ready, who was re-elected in 2018 with 71.5% of the vote, ran for a third term, unopposed.

2022 Maryland's 5th Senate district election
Party	Candidate	Votes	%	±%
Republican	Justin Ready (incumbent)	39,484	96.11%	+24.65%
Write-in		1,598	3.89%	+3.78%
Total votes		41,082	100.00%	
Republican hold				

=== District 6 ===
2022 Maryland Senate 6th District election
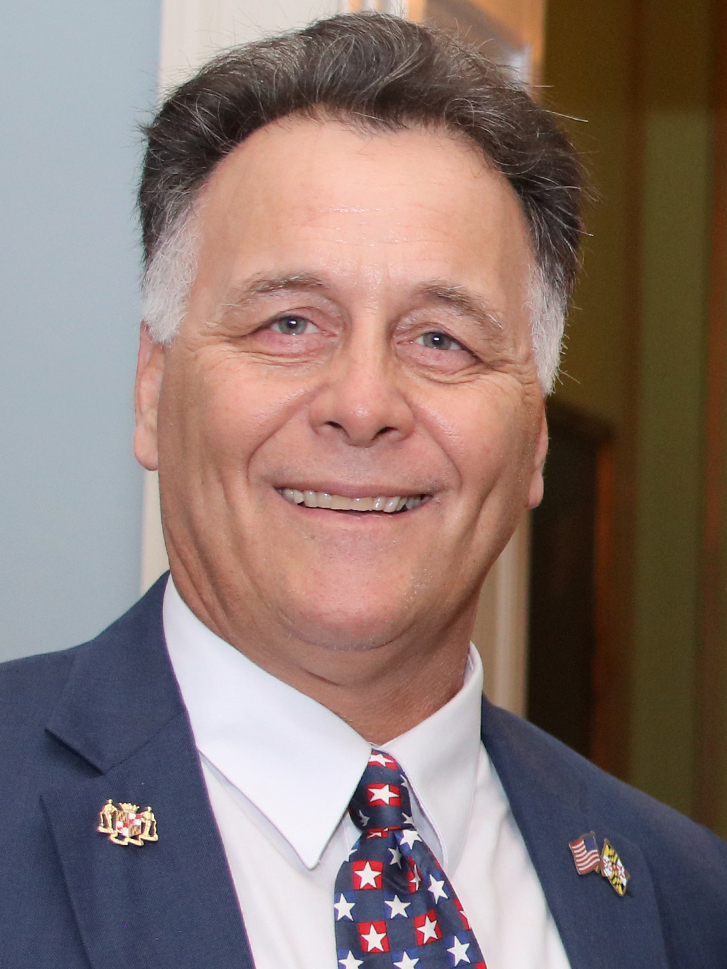

Candidate	Johnny Ray Salling	Cory Edwards
Party	Republican	Democratic
Popular vote	18,278	11,563
Percentage	61.2%	38.7%
- Precinct results Salling: 50–60% 60–70% 70–80% Edwards: 50–60% 60–70% 70–80% >90%
State senator before election
Johnny Ray Salling
Republican
Elected State senator
Johnny Ray Salling
Republican

The new 6th district encompasses southeast Baltimore County, including Dundalk, Essex, and Edgemere. Two-term Republican incumbent Johnny Ray Salling, who was re-elected in 2018 with 55.3% of the vote, ran for a third term.

==== Republican primary ====
Republican primary results
Party	Candidate	Votes	%
Republican	Johnny Ray Salling (incumbent)	4,308	72.5
Republican	Charles C. Collins	885	14.9
Republican	Michael S. Myers	748	12.6
Total votes		5,941	100.0

==== Democratic primary ====
Democratic primary results
Party	Candidate	Votes	%
Democratic	Cory D. Edwards	4,159	68.1
Democratic	No Tax Russ Mirabile	1,947	38.9
Total votes		6,106	100.0

==== General election ====
2022 Maryland's 6th Senate district election
Party	Candidate	Votes	%	±%
Republican	Johnny Ray Salling (incumbent)	18,278	61.16%	+5.85%
Democratic	Cory D. Edwards	11,563	38.69%	−1.31%
Write-in		44	0.15%	+0.08%
Total votes		29,885	100.00%	
Republican hold				

=== District 7 ===
2022 Maryland Senate 7th District election
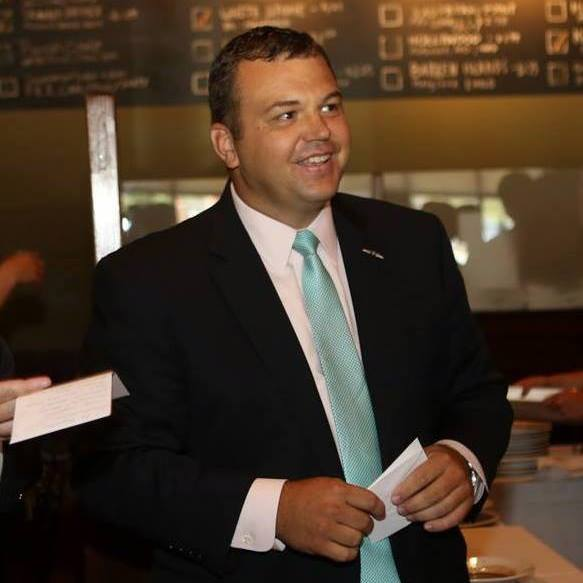
Candidate	J. B. Jennings
Party	Republican
Popular vote	37,513
Percentage	96.0%
- Precinct results Jennings: 80–90% >90%
State senator before election
J. B. Jennings
Republican
Elected State senator
J. B. Jennings
Republican

The new 7th district runs along the border of Baltimore and Harford counties. Three-term Republican incumbent J. B. Jennings, who was re-elected in 2018 with 66.9% of the vote, ran for a fourth term, unopposed.

2022 Maryland's 7th Senate district election
Party	Candidate	Votes	%	±%
Republican	J. B. Jennings (incumbent)	37,513	96.02%	+29.15%
Write-in		1,555	3.98%	+3.86%
Total votes		39,068	100.00%	
Republican hold				

=== District 8 ===
2022 Maryland Senate 8th District election
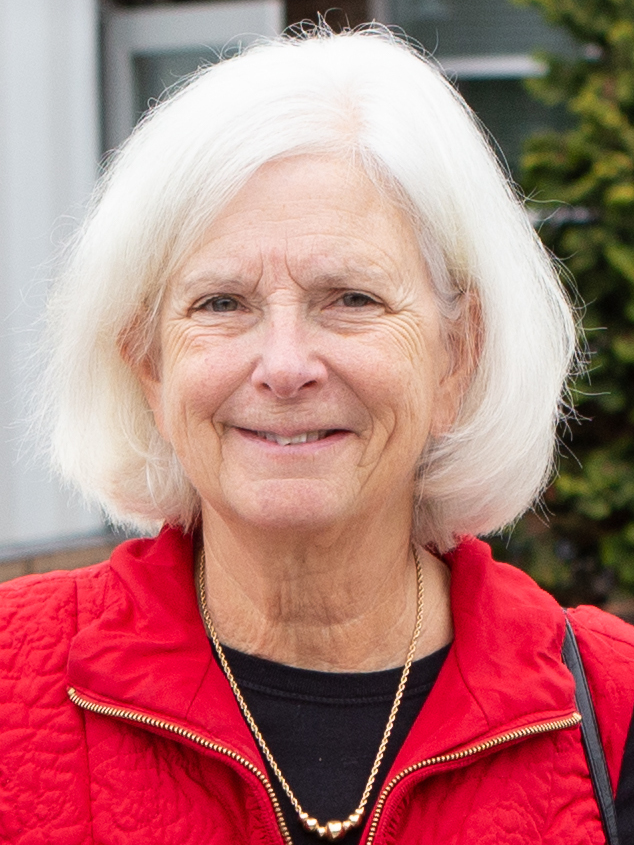

Candidate	Kathy Klausmeier	Ken Fitch
Party	Democratic	Republican
Popular vote	22,773	11,554
Percentage	66.3%	33.6%
- Precinct results Klausmeier: 50–60% 60–70% 70–80% 80–90% >90%
State senator before election
Kathy Klausmeier
Democratic
Elected State senator
Kathy Klausmeier
Democratic

The new 8th district consists of part of Baltimore County, including Perry Hall and Parkville. Five-term Democratic incumbent Kathy Klausmeier, who was re-elected in 2018 with 51.1% of the vote, ran for a sixth term.

==== Democratic primary ====
Democratic primary results
Party	Candidate	Votes	%
Democratic	Kathy Klausmeier (incumbent)	8,370	80.2
Democratic	Thomas Mwaura	2,062	19.8
Total votes		10,432	100.0

==== General election ====
2022 Maryland's 8th Senate district election
Party	Candidate	Votes	%	±%
Democratic	Kathy Klausmeier (incumbent)	22,773	66.26%	+15.19%
Republican	Ken Fitch	11,554	33.62%	−15.22%
Write-in		41	0.12%	+0.03%
Total votes		34,368	100.00%	
Democratic hold				

=== District 9 ===
2022 Maryland Senate 9th District election
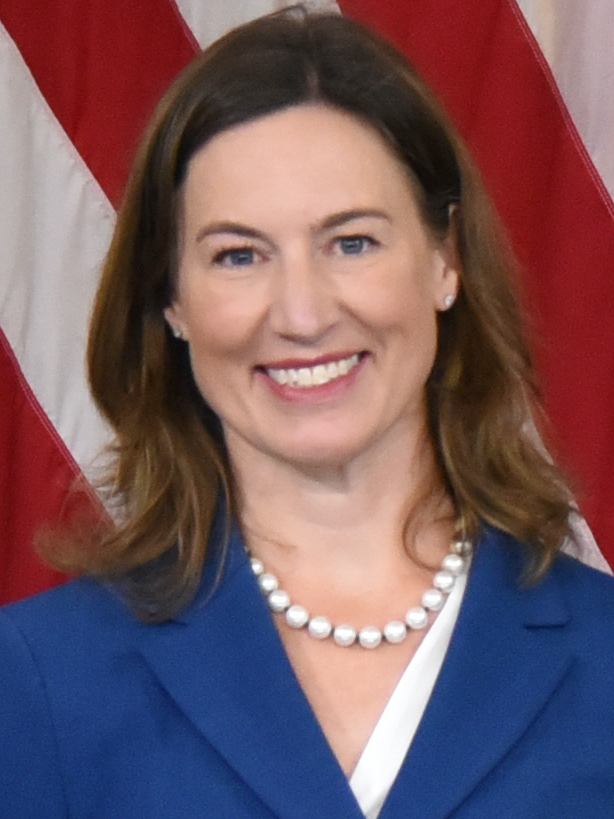

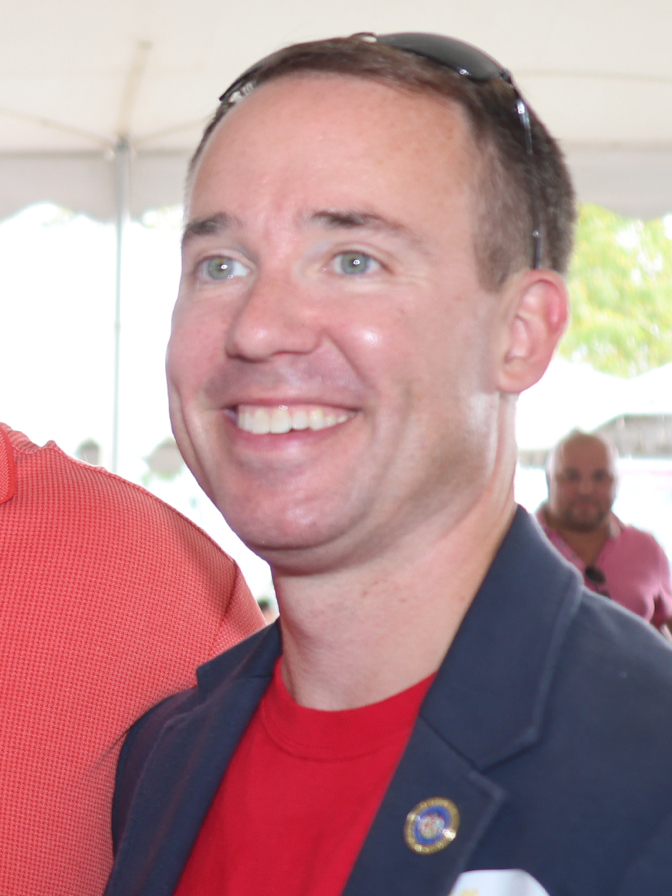
Candidate	Katie Fry Hester	Reid Novotny
Party	Democratic	Republican
Popular vote	31,214	22,637
Percentage	57.9%	42.0%
- Precinct results Hester: 50–60% 60–70% 70–80% 80–90% Novotny: 50–60% 60–70%
State senator before election
Katie Fry Hester
Democratic
Elected State senator
Katie Fry Hester
Democratic

The new 9th district encompasses north Howard county, including Ellicott City and Clarksville, and Damascus in Montgomery County. First-term Democratic incumbent Katie Fry Hester, who was elected in 2018 with 50.8% of the vote, ran for a second term.

2022 Maryland's 9th Senate district election
Party	Candidate	Votes	%	±%
Democratic	Katie Fry Hester (incumbent)	31,214	57.92	+7.09%
Republican	Reid Novotny	22,637	42.00	−7.09%
Write-in		42	0.08	0.00%
Total votes		53,893	100.00	
Democratic hold				

=== District 10 ===
2022 Maryland Senate 10th District election
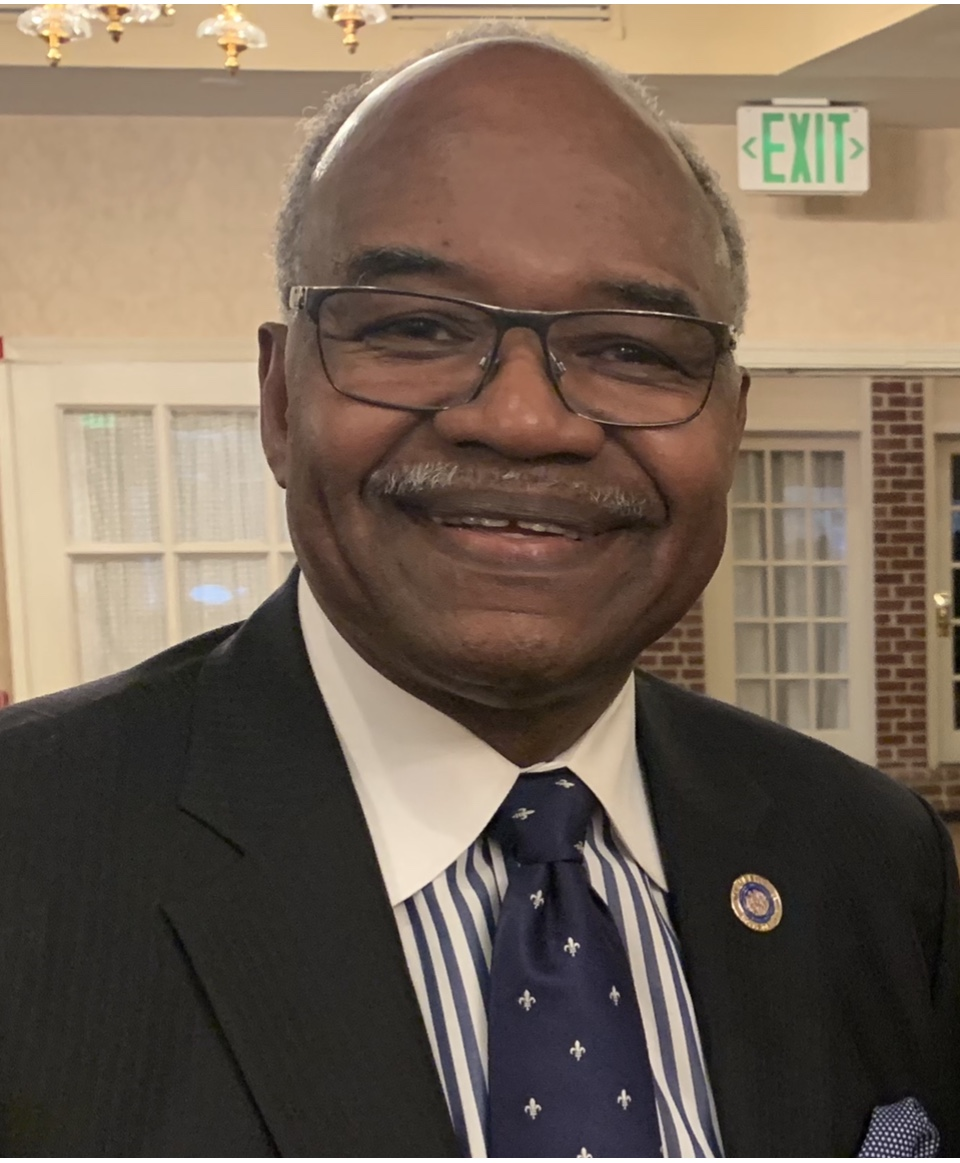

Candidate	Benjamin Brooks	William Newton
Party	Democratic	Republican
Popular vote	31,373	8,460
Percentage	78.6%	21.2%
- Precinct results Brooks: 50–60% 60–70% 70–80% 80–90% >90% Newton: 50–60%
State senator before election
Delores G. Kelley
Democratic
Elected State senator
Benjamin Brooks
Democratic

The new 10th district encompasses east Baltimore County, including Randallstown and Reisterstown. Seven-term Democratic incumbent Delores G. Kelley, who was re-elected in 2018 with 80.3% of the vote, announced on December 13, 2021, that she would not run for re-election to an eighth term.

==== Democratic primary ====
Maryland Matters identified the Democratic primary election in District 10 as a "race to watch".

Democratic primary results
Party	Candidate	Votes	%
Democratic	Benjamin Brooks	6,432	37.6
Democratic	Jay Jalisi	5,347	31.3
Democratic	Stephanie Boston	3,087	18.0
Democratic	Lawrence Williams	2,245	13.1
Total votes		17,111	100.0

==== General election ====
2022 Maryland's 10th Senate district election
Party	Candidate	Votes	%	±%
Democratic	Benjamin Brooks	31,373	78.63%	−1.70%
Republican	William Newton	8,460	21.20%	+1.70%
Write-in		65	0.16%	+0.01%
Total votes		39,898	100.00%	
Democratic hold				

=== District 11 ===
2022 Maryland Senate 11th District election
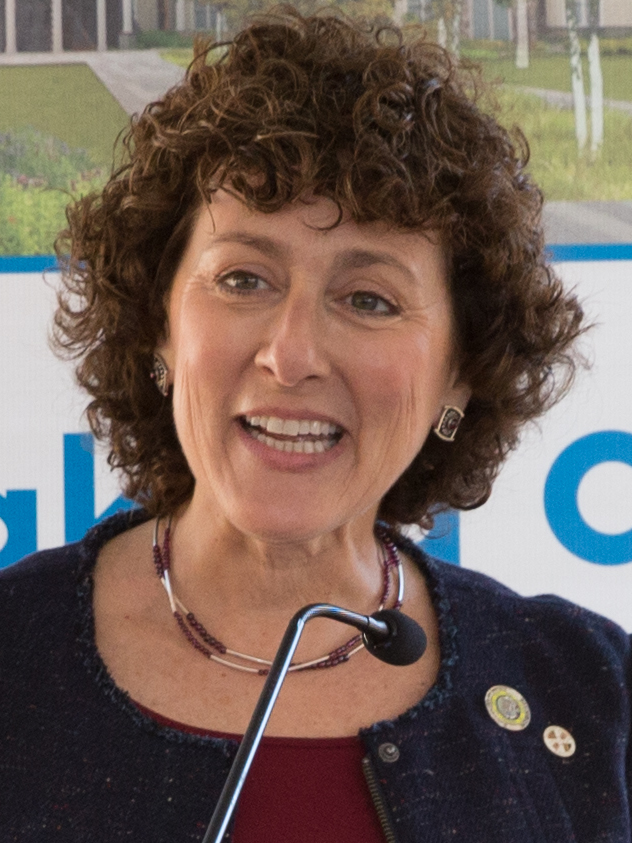

Candidate	Shelly Hettleman	Ruth Goetz
Party	Democratic	Republican
Popular vote	33,409	13,310
Percentage	71.5%	28.5%
- Precinct results Hettleman: 50–60% 60–70% 70–80% 80–90% >90% Goetz: 50–60%
State senator before election
Shelly Hettleman
Democratic
Elected State senator
Shelly Hettleman
Democratic

The new 11th district encompasses central Baltimore County, including Owings Mills, Pikesville, and Mays Chapel. Democratic incumbent Shelly L. Hettleman ran for a full term after being appointed to the seat on February 3, 2020, following the resignation of Robert Zirkin, who was re-elected in 2018 with 96.9% of the vote.

2022 Maryland's 11th Senate district election
Party	Candidate	Votes	%	±%
Democratic	Shelly L. Hettleman (incumbent)	33,409	71.46%	−25.43%
Republican	Ruth Goetz	13,310	28.47%	N/A
Write-in		34	0.07%	-3.04%
Total votes		46,753	100.00%	
Democratic hold				

=== District 12 ===
2022 Maryland Senate 12th District election
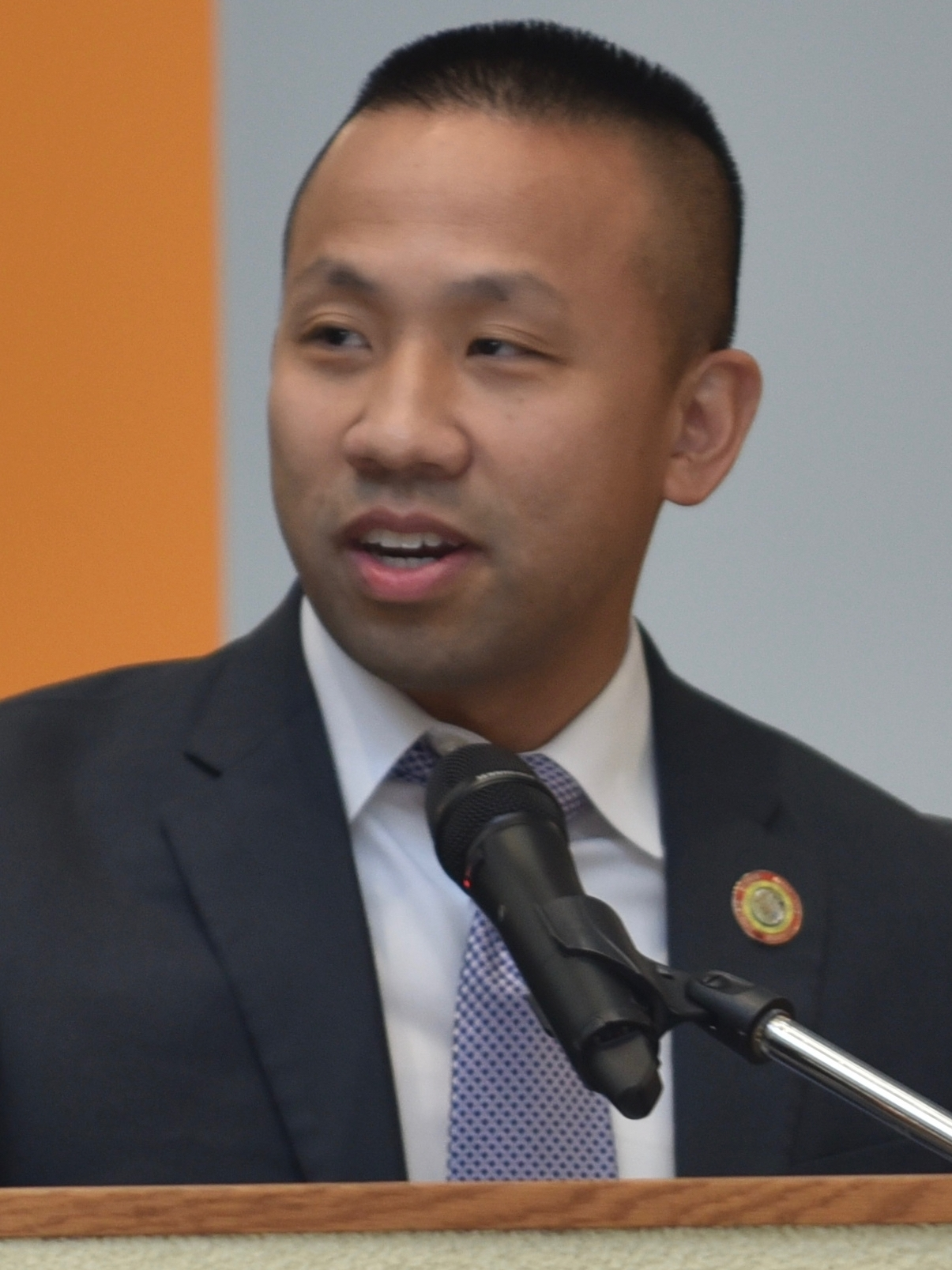

Candidate	Clarence Lam	Bob Cockey
Party	Democratic	Republican
Popular vote	30,570	13,078
Percentage	70.0%	29.9%
- Precinct results Lam: 50–60% 60–70% 70–80% 80–90% Cockey: 50–60%
State senator before election
Clarence Lam
Democratic
Elected State senator
Clarence Lam
Democratic

The new 12th district encompasses parts of Howard and Anne Arundel counties, including Columbia, Brooklyn Park, and part of Glen Burnie. First-term Democratic incumbent Clarence Lam, who was elected in 2018 with 66.1% of the vote, ran for a second term.

==== Republican primary ====
Republican primary results
Party	Candidate	Votes	%
Republican	Bob Cockey	2,917	75.5
Republican	Mavourene Robinson	947	24.5
Total votes		3,864	100.0

==== General election ====
2022 Maryland's 12th Senate district election
Party	Candidate	Votes	%	±%
Democratic	Clarence Lam (incumbent)	30,570	69.97%	+3.88%
Republican	Bob Cockey	13,078	29.93%	−3.88%
Write-in		44	0.10%	+0.01%
Total votes		43,692	100.00%	
Democratic hold				

=== District 13 ===
2022 Maryland Senate 13th District election
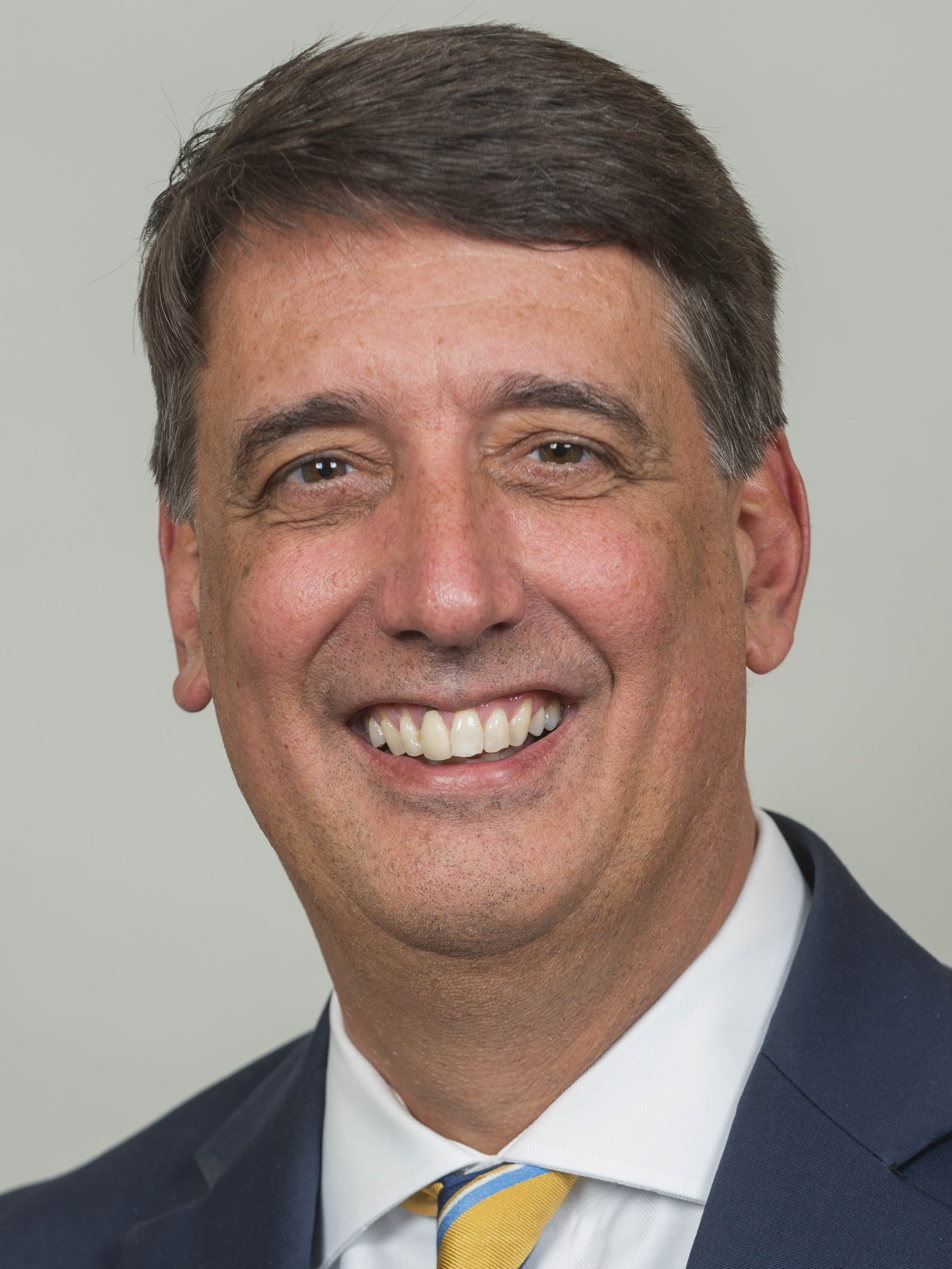
Candidate	Guy Guzzone
Party	Democratic
Popular vote	37,241
Percentage	97.1%
- Precinct results Guzzone: >90%
State senator before election
Guy Guzzone
Democratic
Elected State senator
Guy Guzzone
Democratic

The new 13th district encompasses south Howard County. Two-term Democratic incumbent Guy Guzzone, who was re-elected in 2018 with 97.4% of the vote, ran for a third term, unopposed.

2022 Maryland's 13th Senate district election
Party	Candidate	Votes	%	±%
Democratic	Guy Guzzone (incumbent)	37,241	97.14%	−0.25%
Write-in		1,095	2.86%	+0.25%
Total votes		38,336	100.00%	
Democratic hold				

=== District 14 ===
2022 Maryland Senate 14th District election
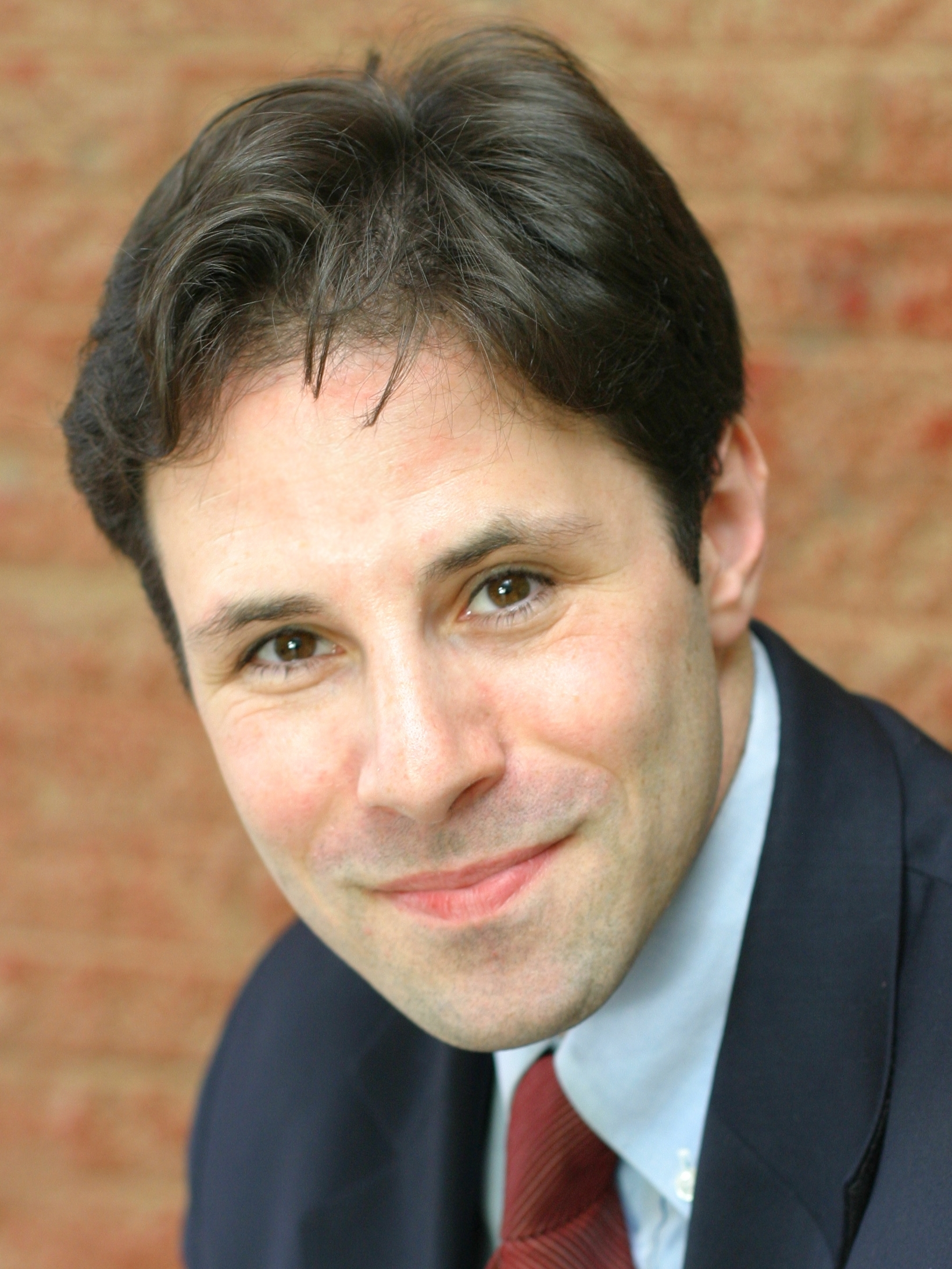

Candidate	Craig Zucker	Alex Bieber
Party	Democratic	Republican
Popular vote	33,334	12,099
Percentage	73.3%	26.6%
- Precinct results Zucker: 50–60% 60–70% 70–80% 80–90% >90% Bieber: 50–60%
State senator before election
Craig Zucker
Democratic
Elected State senator
Craig Zucker
Democratic

The new 14th district runs along the border of Howard and Montgomery counties, including Olney. First-term Democratic incumbent Craig Zucker, who was elected in 2018 with 72.6% of the vote, ran for a second term.

==== Democratic primary ====
Democratic primary results
Party	Candidate	Votes	%
Democratic	Craig Zucker (incumbent)	14,054	84.4
Democratic	Collins Odongo	2,600	15.6
Total votes		16,654	100.0

==== General election ====
2022 Maryland's 14th Senate district election
Party	Candidate	Votes	%	±%
Democratic	Craig Zucker (incumbent)	33,334	73.28	+0.72%
Republican	Alex Bieber	12,099	26.60	−0.75%
Write-in		55	0.12	+0.03%
Total votes		45,488	100.00	
Democratic hold				

=== District 15 ===
2022 Maryland Senate 15th District election
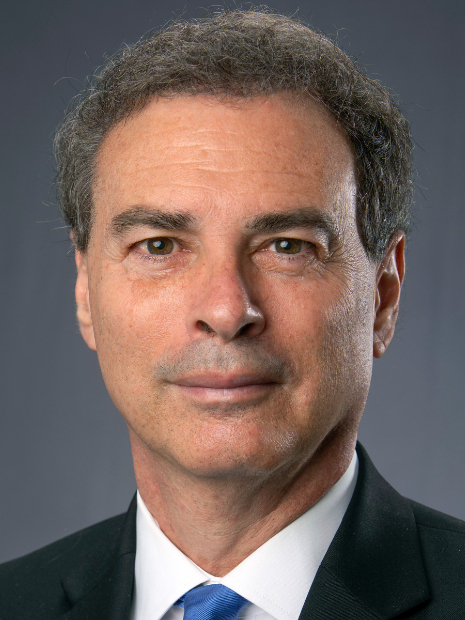

Candidate	Brian Feldman	David Wilson
Party	Democratic	Republican
Popular vote	33,264	12,231
Percentage	73.0%	26.9%
- Precinct results Lam: 50–60% 60–70% 70–80% 80–90%
State senator before election
Brian Feldman
Democratic
Elected State senator
Brian Feldman
Democratic

The new 15th district encompasses east Montgomery County, including North Potomac and parts of Germantown. Two-term Democratic incumbent Brian Feldman, who was re-elected in 2018 with 72.0% of the vote, ran for a third term.

2022 Maryland's 15th Senate district election
Party	Candidate	Votes	%	±%
Democratic	Brian Feldman (incumbent)	33,264	73.04	+1.00%
Republican	David Wilson	12,231	26.86	−1.02%
Write-in		46	0.10	+0.02%
Total votes		45,541	100.00	
Democratic hold				

=== District 16 ===
2022 Maryland Senate 16th District election
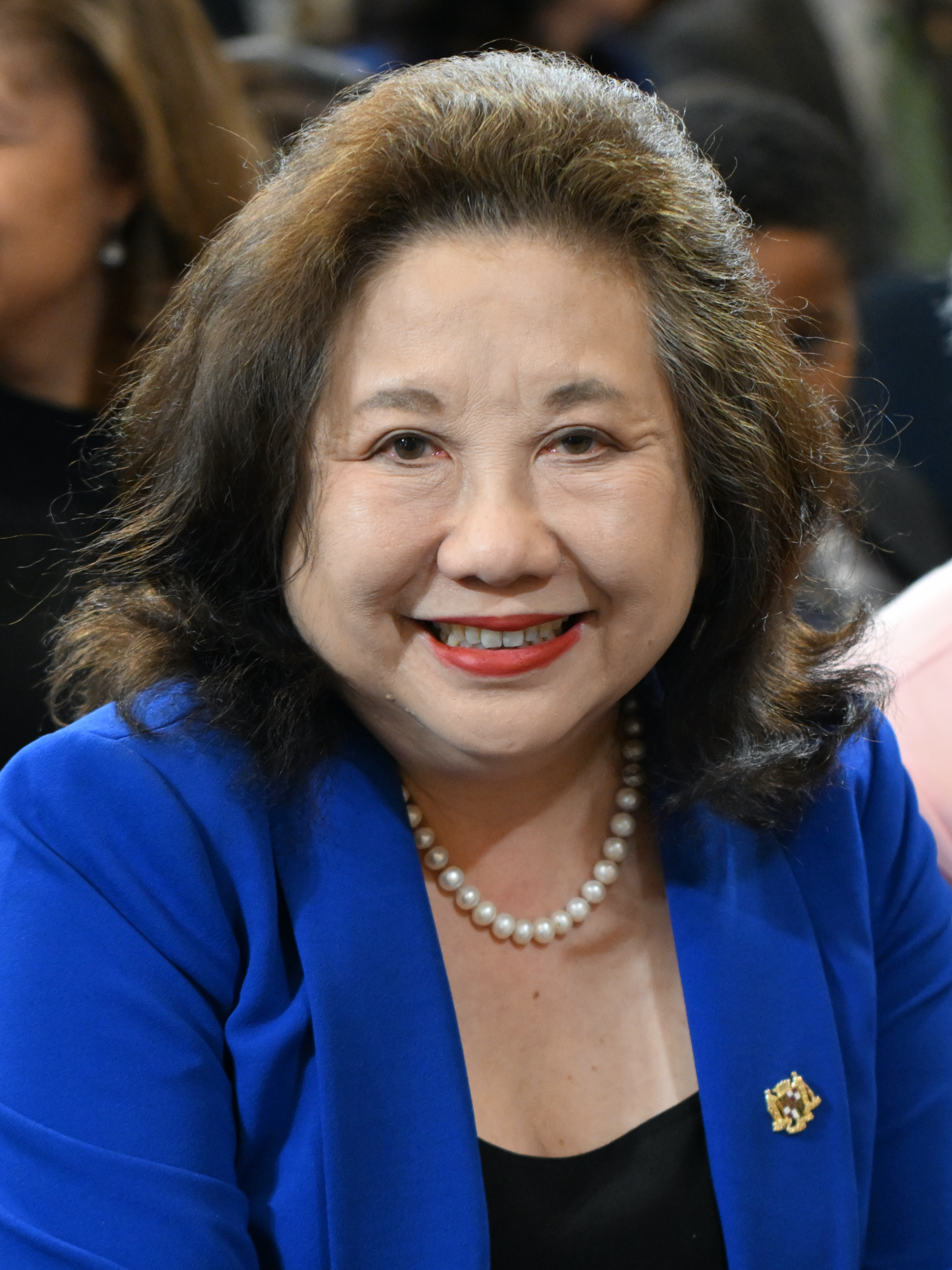
Candidate	Susan C. Lee
Party	Democratic
Popular vote	44,925
Percentage	97.8%
- Precinct results Lee: >90%
State senator before election
Susan C. Lee
Democratic
Elected State senator
Susan C. Lee
Democratic

The new 16th district consists of south Montgomery County, including Potomac and parts of Bethesda. Two-term Democratic incumbent Susan C. Lee, who was re-elected in 2018 with 80.1% of the vote, ran for a third term, unopposed.

2022 Maryland's 16th Senate district election
Party	Candidate	Votes	%	±%
Democratic	Susan C. Lee (incumbent)	44,925	97.80	+17.68%
Write-in		1,012	2.20	+2.10%
Total votes		45,937	100.00	
Democratic hold				

=== District 17 ===
2022 Maryland Senate 17th District election
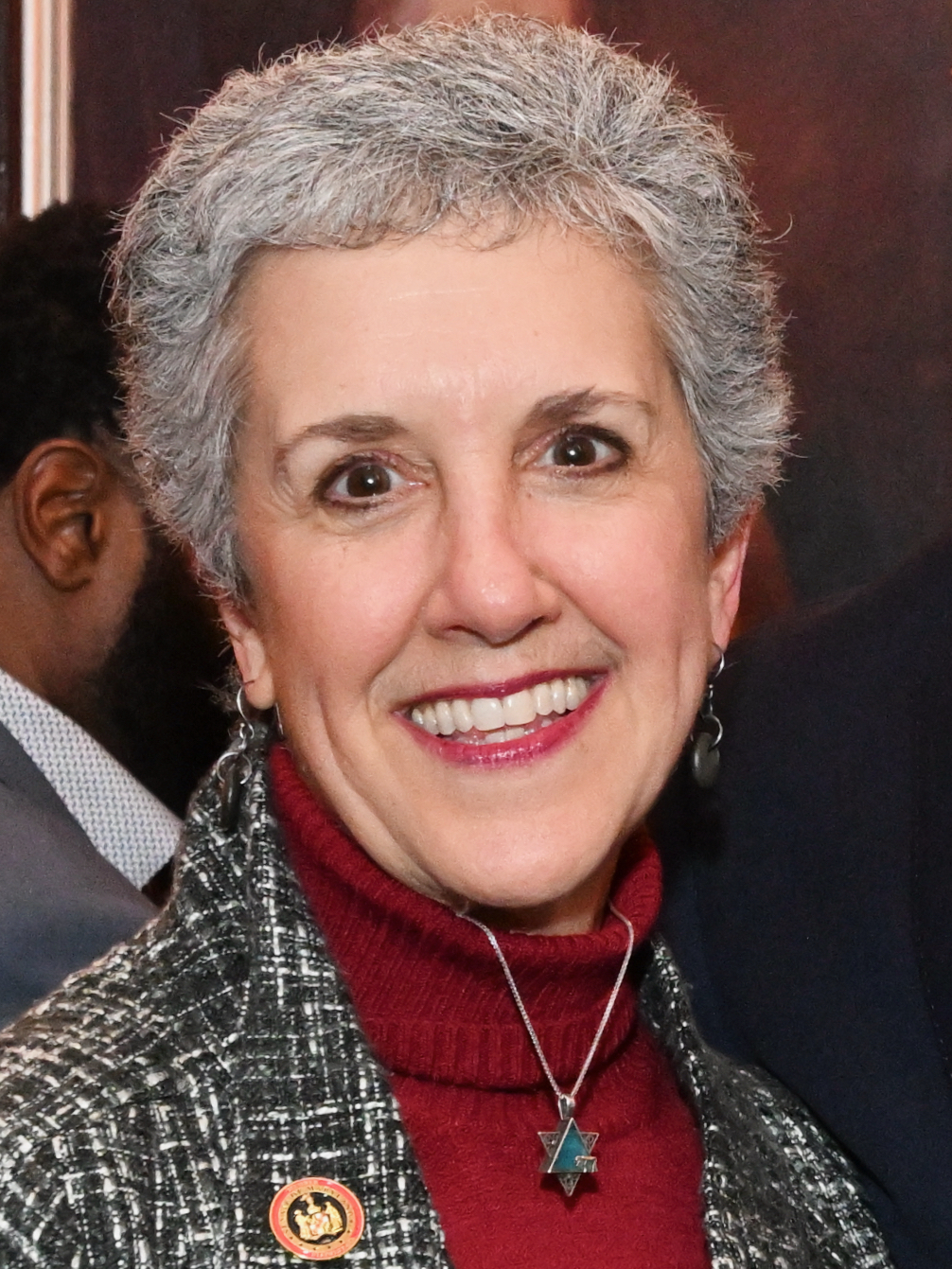
Candidate	Cheryl Kagan
Party	Democratic
Popular vote	44,925
Percentage	97.8%
- Precinct results Kagan: >90%
State senator before election
Cheryl Kagan
Democratic
Elected State senator
Cheryl Kagan
Democratic

The new 17th district consists of Rockville and Gaithersburg. Two-term Democratic incumbent Cheryl Kagan, who was re-elected in 2018 with 79.0% of the vote, ran for a third term.

2022 Maryland's 17th Senate district election
Party	Candidate	Votes	%	±%
Democratic	Cheryl Kagan (incumbent)	31,639	97.19	+18.16%
Write-in		915	2.81	+2.68%
Total votes		32,554	100.00	
Democratic hold				

=== District 18 ===
2022 Maryland Senate 18th District election

Candidate	Jeff Waldstreicher	Missy Carr
Party	Democratic	Republican
Popular vote	34,169	6,935
Percentage	82.8%	16.8%
- Precinct results Waldstreicher: 70–80% 80–90% >90%
State senator before election
Jeff Waldstreicher
Democratic
Elected State senator
Jeff Waldstreicher
Democratic

The new 18th district consists of Bethesda, Chevy Chase, Wheaton, and Kensington. First-term Democratic incumbent Jeff Waldstreicher, who was elected in 2018 with 97.6% of the vote, ran for a second term.

==== Democratic primary ====
Maryland Matters identified the Democratic primary election in District 18 as a "race to watch". During the Democratic primary, Waldstreicher faced a primary challenge from progressive activist Max Socol, who accused Waldstreicher of weakening the Maryland Police Accountability Act during the 2021 legislative session and of dodging candidate events during the primary. Waldstreicher responded to these accusations by saying he held two town halls during the Democratic primary and freely shares his personal cell phone number with constituents. Waldstreicher outraised Socol 4-to-1, was endorsed by the Montgomery County Education Association, the Maryland Sierra Club, and Service Employees International Union Local 500, and received support from the Maryland Democratic Senate Caucus Committee. He won the Democratic primary on July 19, 2022, defeating Socol with 63.8 percent of the vote to Socol's 36.2 percent.

Democratic primary results
Party	Candidate	Votes	%
Democratic	Jeff Waldstreicher (incumbent)	12,117	63.8
Democratic	Max Socol	6,883	36.2
Total votes		19,000	100.0

==== General election ====
2022 Maryland's 18th Senate district election
Party	Candidate	Votes	%	±%
Democratic	Jeff Waldstreicher (incumbent)	34,169	82.80	−14.82%
Republican	Missy Carr	6,935	16.81	N/A
Write-in		162	0.39	-1.99%
Total votes		41,266	100.00	
Democratic hold				

=== District 19 ===
2022 Maryland Senate 19th District election
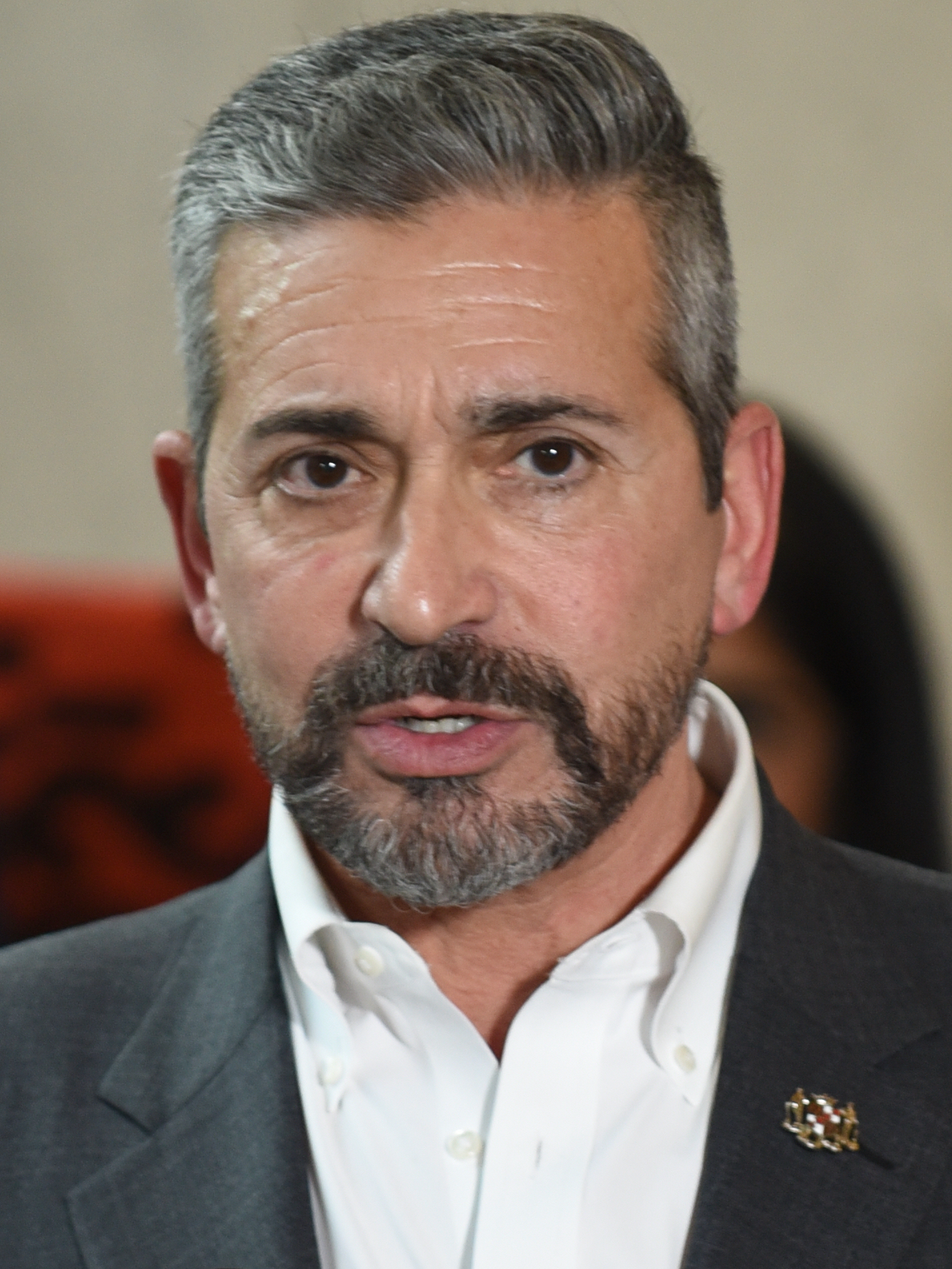

Candidate	Benjamin F. Kramer	Anita Cox
Party	Democratic	Republican
Popular vote	29,473	8,084
Percentage	75.5%	22.6%
- Precinct results Kramer: 50–60% 60–70% 70–80% 80–90% >90%
State senator before election
Benjamin F. Kramer
Democratic
Elected State senator
Benjamin F. Kramer
Democratic

The new 19th district includes Aspen Hill, Leisure World, and Redland. First-term Democratic incumbent Benjamin F. Kramer, who was elected in 2018 with 88.0% of the vote, ran for a second term.

Raul Ayala won the Republican primary, but declined the nomination. The Montgomery County Republican Central Committee consequently nominated Anita Cox to run against Kramer in the general election.

==== Republican primary ====
Republican primary results
Party	Candidate	Votes	%
Republican	Raul R. Ayala	1,315	50.6
Republican	Anita Mpambara Cox	1,287	49.4
Total votes		2,602	100.0

==== General election ====
2022 Maryland's 19th Senate district election
Party	Candidate	Votes	%	±%
Democratic	Benjamin F. Kramer (incumbent)	29,473	75.51	−12.50%
Republican	Anita Mpambara Cox	8,084	22.55	N/A
Green	David George Jeang	724	1.85	−8.86%
Write-in		34	0.09	-1.20%
Total votes		39,035	100.00	
Democratic hold				

=== District 20 ===
2022 Maryland Senate 20th District election
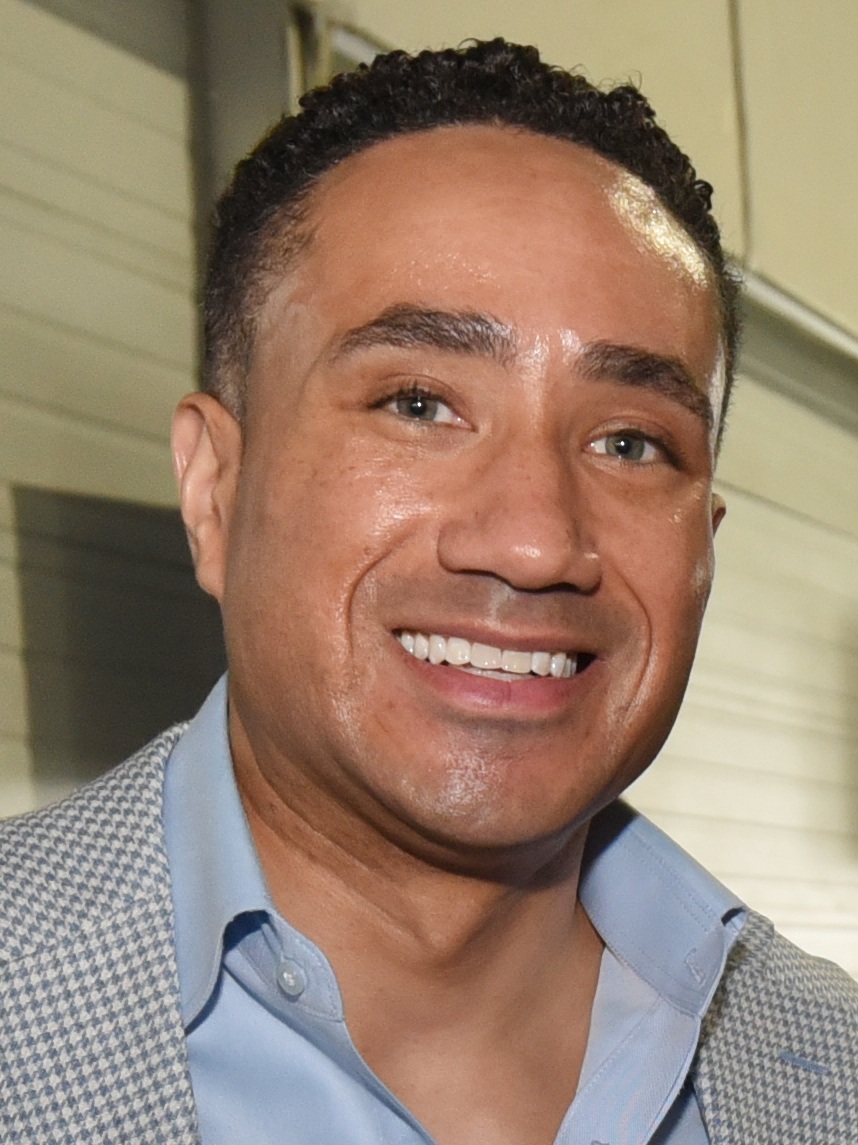
Candidate	William C. Smith Jr.
Party	Democratic
Popular vote	34,113
Percentage	98.8%
- Precinct results Smith: >90%
State senator before election
William C. Smith Jr.
Democratic
Elected State senator
William C. Smith Jr.
Democratic

The new 20th district includes Silver Spring, White Oak, and Takoma Park. First-term Democratic incumbent William C. Smith Jr., who was elected in 2018 with 90.8% of the vote, ran for a second term.

==== Democratic primary ====
Democratic primary results
Party	Candidate	Votes	%
Democratic	William C. Smith Jr. (incumbent)	17,121	89.0
Democratic	Enoch Bevel	2,124	11.0
Total votes		19,245	100.0

==== General election ====
2022 Maryland's 20th Senate district election
Party	Candidate	Votes	%	±%
Democratic	William C. Smith Jr. (incumbent)	34,113	98.78	+8.00%
Write-in		422	1.22	+1.14%
Total votes		34,535	100.00	
Democratic hold				

=== District 21 ===
2022 Maryland Senate 21st District election
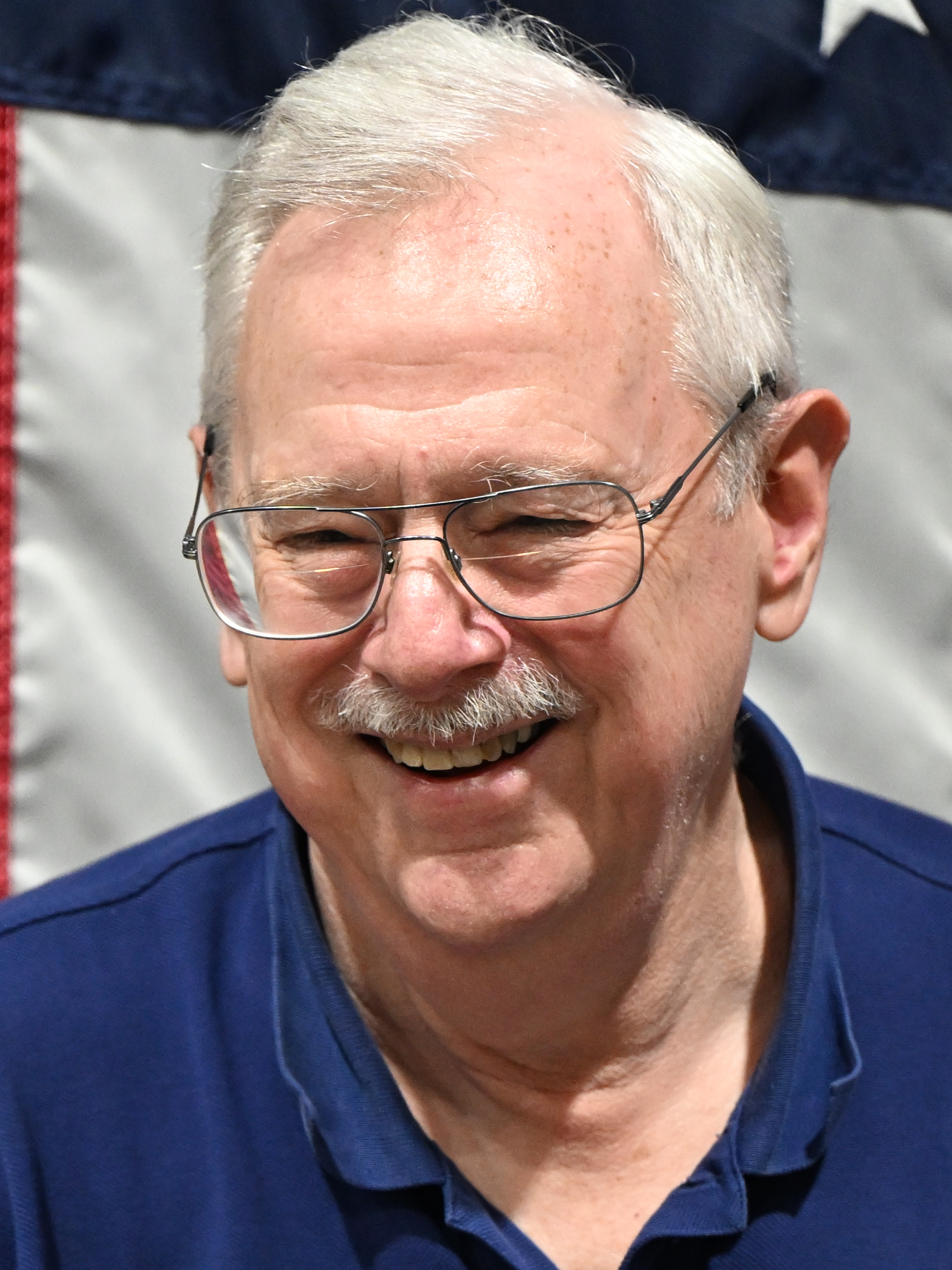

Candidate	James Rosapepe	Lee Havis
Party	Democratic	Republican
Popular vote	23,666	6,242
Percentage	79.0%	20.8%
- Precinct results Rosapepe: 50–60% 60–70% 70–80% 80–90% >90% Havis: 50–60%
State senator before election
James Rosapepe
Democratic
Elected State senator
James Rosapepe
Democratic

The new 21st district includes parts of Prince George's and Anne Arundel counties, including College Park, Laurel, and Beltsville. Four-term Democratic incumbent James Rosapepe, who was re-elected in 2018 with 77.5% of the vote, ran for a fifth term.

2022 Maryland's 21st Senate district election
Party	Candidate	Votes	%	±%
Democratic	James Rosapepe (incumbent)	23,666	79.01	+1.51%
Republican	Lee Havis	6,242	20.84	−1.53%
Write-in		46	0.15	+0.01%
Total votes		29,954	100.00	
Democratic hold				

=== District 22 ===
2022 Maryland Senate 22nd District election
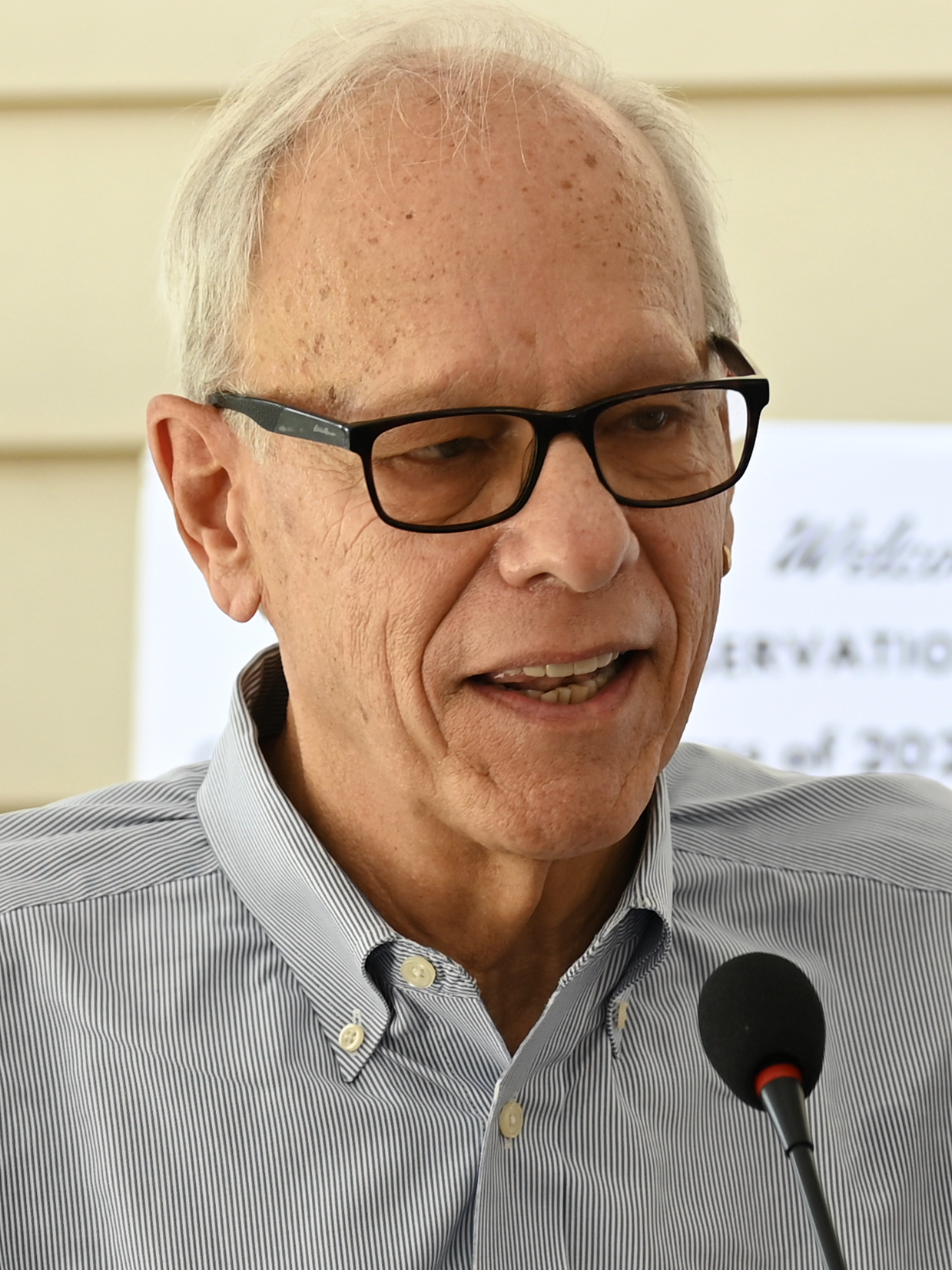
Candidate	Paul G. Pinsky
Party	Democratic
Popular vote	23,580
Percentage	98.6%
- Precinct results Pinsky: >90%
State senator before election
Paul G. Pinsky
Democratic
Elected State senator
Paul G. Pinsky
Democratic

The new 22nd district consists of Hyattsville, Greenbelt, and Riverdale Park. Seven-term Democratic incumbent Paul G. Pinsky, who was re-elected in 2018 with 92.4% of the vote, ran for an eighth term.

==== Democratic primary ====
Democratic primary results
Party	Candidate	Votes	%
Democratic	Paul G. Pinsky (incumbent)	9,201	74.6
Democratic	Rashad D. Lloyd	3,131	25.4
Total votes		12,332	100.0

==== General election ====
2022 Maryland's 22nd Senate district election
Party	Candidate	Votes	%	±%
Democratic	Paul G. Pinsky (incumbent)	23,580	98.57	+6.13%
Write-in		343	1.43	+1.06%
Total votes		23,923	100.00	
Democratic hold				

=== District 23 ===
2022 Maryland Senate 23rd District election
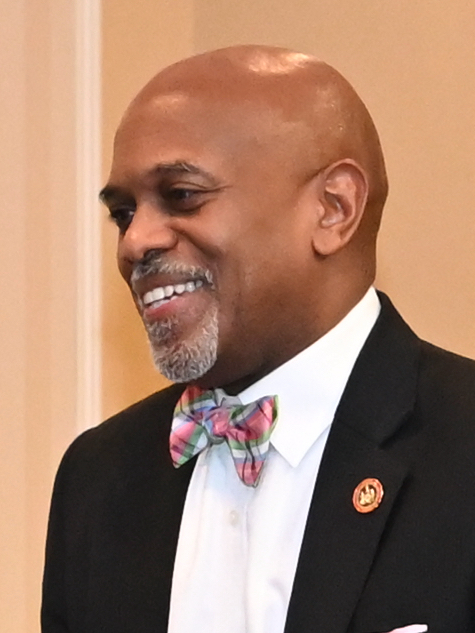

Candidate	Ron Watson	Jesse Peed
Party	Democratic	Republican
Popular vote	41,343	5,886
Percentage	87.4%	12.4%
- Precinct results Watson: 60–70% 70–80% 80–90% >90%
State senator before election
Ron Watson
Democratic
Elected State senator
Ron Watson
Democratic

The new 23rd district runs along the border of Prince George's and Anne Arundel counties, including Upper Marlboro, Bowie, and South Laurel. Democratic incumbent Ron Watson ran for a full term after being appointed to the seat on August 31, 2021, following the resignation of Douglas J. J. Peters, who was re-elected in 2018 with 98.6% of the vote.

==== Democratic primary ====
Maryland Matters identified the Democratic primary election in District 23 as a "race to watch".

Democratic primary results
Party	Candidate	Votes	%
Democratic	Ron Watson (incumbent)	10,359	42.6
Democratic	Raaheela Ahmed	9,415	38.7
Democratic	Sylvia Johnson	4,567	18.8
Total votes		24,341	100.0

==== General election ====
2022 Maryland's 23rd Senate district election
Party	Candidate	Votes	%	±%
Democratic	Ron Watson (incumbent)	41,343	87.37	−11.21%
Republican	Jesse Peed	5,886	12.44	N/A
Write-in		93	0.20	-1.23%
Total votes		47,322	100.00	
Democratic hold				

=== District 24 ===
2022 Maryland Senate 24th District election
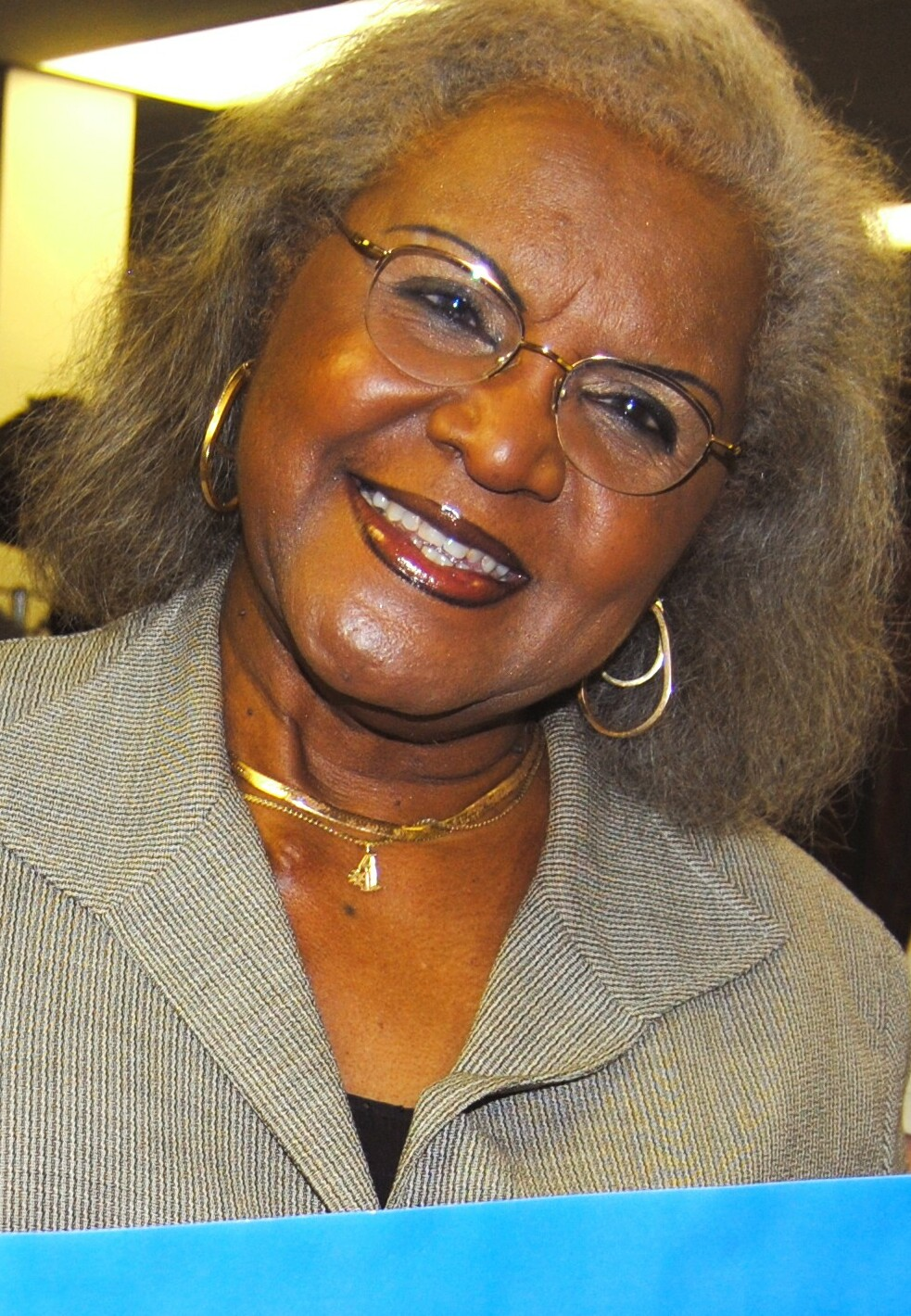
Candidate	Joanne C. Benson
Party	Democratic
Popular vote	33,668
Percentage	99.2%
- Precinct results Benson: >90%
State senator before election
Joanne C. Benson
Democratic
Elected State senator
Joanne C. Benson
Democratic

The new 24th district consists of Seat Pleasant, Springdale, and Lake Arbor. Three-term Democratic incumbent Joanne C. Benson, who was re-elected in 2018 with 99.2% of the vote, ran for a fourth term, unopposed.

2022 Maryland's 24th Senate district election
Party	Candidate	Votes	%	±%
Democratic	Joanne C. Benson (incumbent)	33,668	99.19	−0.05%
Write-in		274	0.81	+0.05%
Total votes		33,942	100.00	
Democratic hold				

=== District 25 ===
2022 Maryland Senate 25th District election
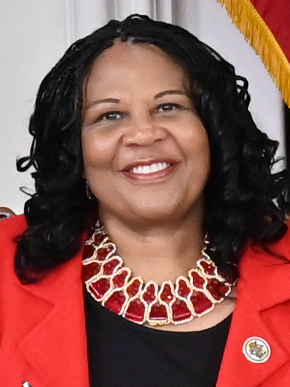
Candidate	Melony G. Griffith
Party	Democratic
Popular vote	35,953
Percentage	99.5%
- Precinct results Griffith: >90% Tie: 50%
State senator before election
Melony G. Griffith
Democratic
Elected State senator
Melony G. Griffith
Democratic

The new 25th district consists of Forestville, Westphalia, and Kettering. First-term Democratic incumbent Melony G. Griffith, who was elected in 2018 with 99.4% of the vote, ran for a second term.

==== Democratic primary ====
Democratic primary results
Party	Candidate	Votes	%
Democratic	Melony G. Griffith (incumbent)	18,774	86.8
Democratic	Jonathan Edward Rosero	2,844	13.2
Total votes		21,618	100.0

==== General election ====
2022 Maryland's 25th Senate district election
Party	Candidate	Votes	%	±%
Democratic	Melony G. Griffith (incumbent)	35,953	99.45	+0.01%
Write-in		200	0.55	-0.01%
Total votes		36,153	100.00	
Democratic hold				

=== District 26 ===
2022 Maryland Senate 26th District election
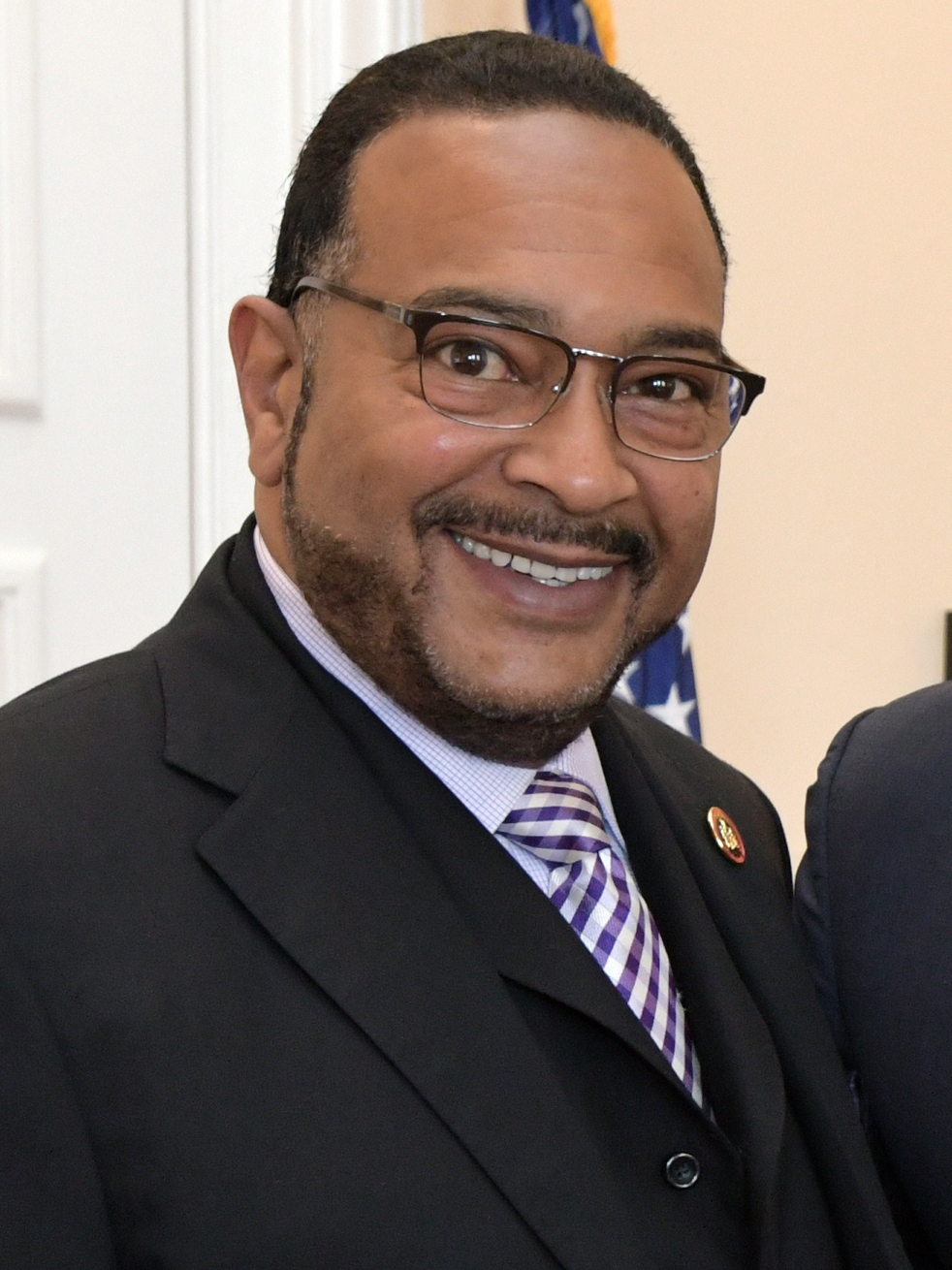

Candidate	C. Anthony Muse	Ike Puzon
Party	Democratic	Republican
Popular vote	33,350	2,643
Percentage	92.3%	7.3%
- Precinct results Muse: 70–80% 80–90% >90%
State senator before election
Obie Patterson
Democratic
Elected State senator
C. Anthony Muse
Democratic

The new 26th district consists of Friendly, Oxon Hill, and Fort Washington. First-term Democratic incumbent Obie Patterson, who was elected in 2018 with 92.5% of the vote, announced on April 6, 2022, that he would not seek re-election to a second term.

==== Democratic primary ====
Democratic primary results
Party	Candidate	Votes	%
Democratic	C. Anthony Muse	10,627	50.8
Democratic	Tamara Davis Brown	10,282	49.2
Total votes		20,909	100.0

==== General election ====
2022 Maryland's 26th Senate district election
Party	Candidate	Votes	%	±%
Democratic	C. Anthony Muse	33,350	92.30	−0.23%
Republican	Ike Puzon	2,643	7.32	+0.24%
Write-in		138	0.38	-0.01%
Total votes		36,131	100.00	
Democratic hold				

=== District 27 ===
2022 Maryland Senate 27th District election
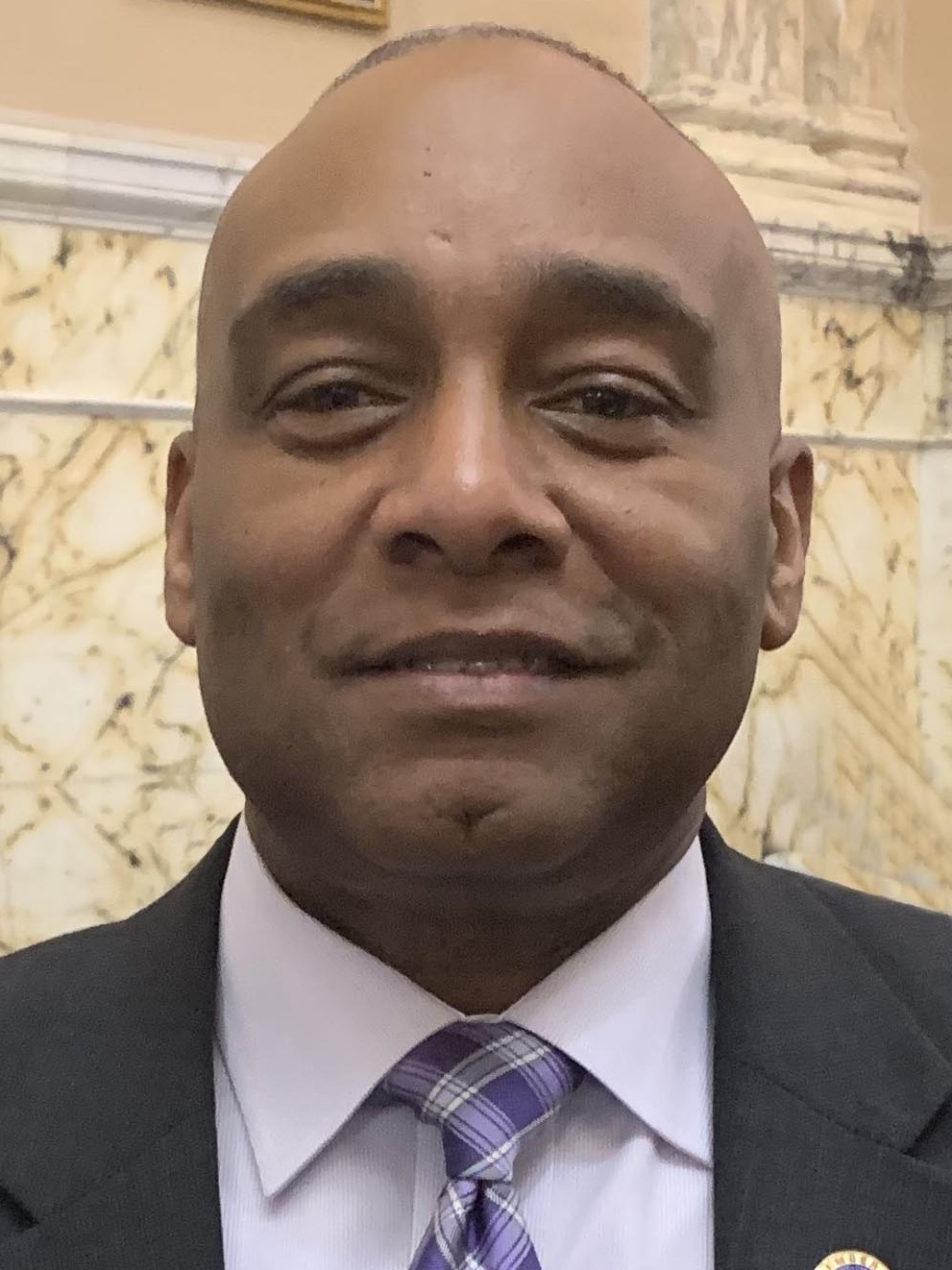

Candidate	Michael Jackson	Al Larsen
Party	Democratic	Republican
Popular vote	30,320	19,892
Percentage	60.3%	39.6%
- Precinct results Jackson: 50–60% 60–70% 70–80% 80–90% >90% Larsen: 50–60% 60–70%
State senator before election
Michael Jackson
Democratic
Elected State senator
Michael Jackson
Democratic

The new 27th district consists of parts of Calvert, Charles, and Prince George's counties, including Chesapeake Beach and Waldorf. Democratic incumbent Michael Jackson ran for a full term after being appointed to the seat on January 13, 2021, following the resignation of former president of the Maryland Senate Thomas V. Miller Jr., who was re-elected in 2018 with 66.0% of the vote.

==== Democratic primary ====
Democratic primary results
Party	Candidate	Votes	%
Democratic	Michael A. Jackson (incumbent)	13,774	89.9
Democratic	Rou Etienne	1,553	10.1
Total votes		15,327	100.0

==== Republican primary ====
Republican primary results
Party	Candidate	Votes	%
Republican	Al Larsen	3,926	52.2
Republican	Kenneth B. Lee	3,596	47.8
Total votes		7,522	100.0

==== General election ====
2022 Maryland's 27th Senate district election
Party	Candidate	Votes	%	±%
Democratic	Michael A. Jackson (incumbent)	30,320	60.32	−5.64%
Republican	Al Larsen	19,892	39.58	+5.72%
Write-in		51	0.10	-0.08%
Total votes		50,263	100.00	
Democratic hold				

=== District 28 ===
2022 Maryland Senate 28th District election
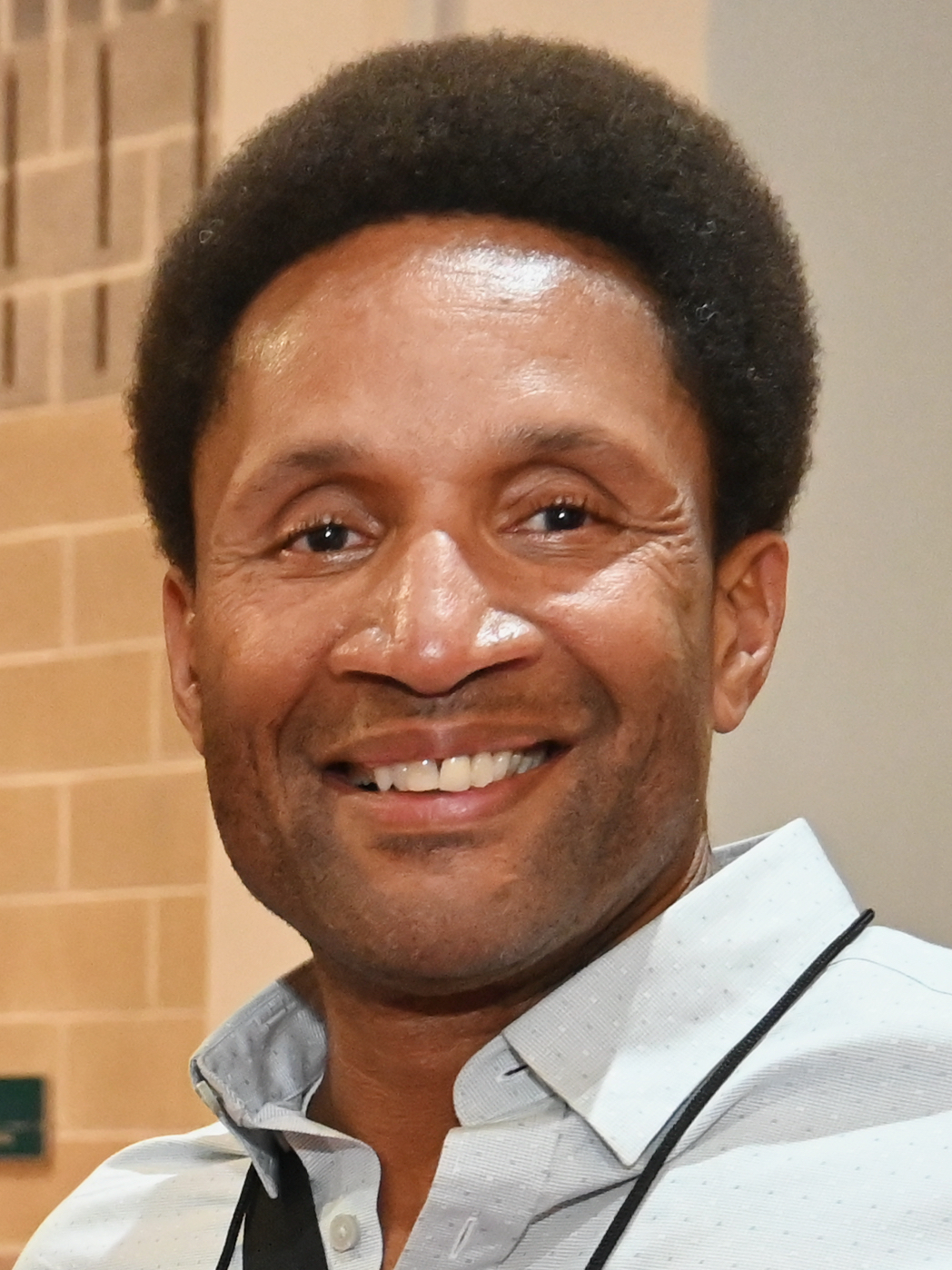

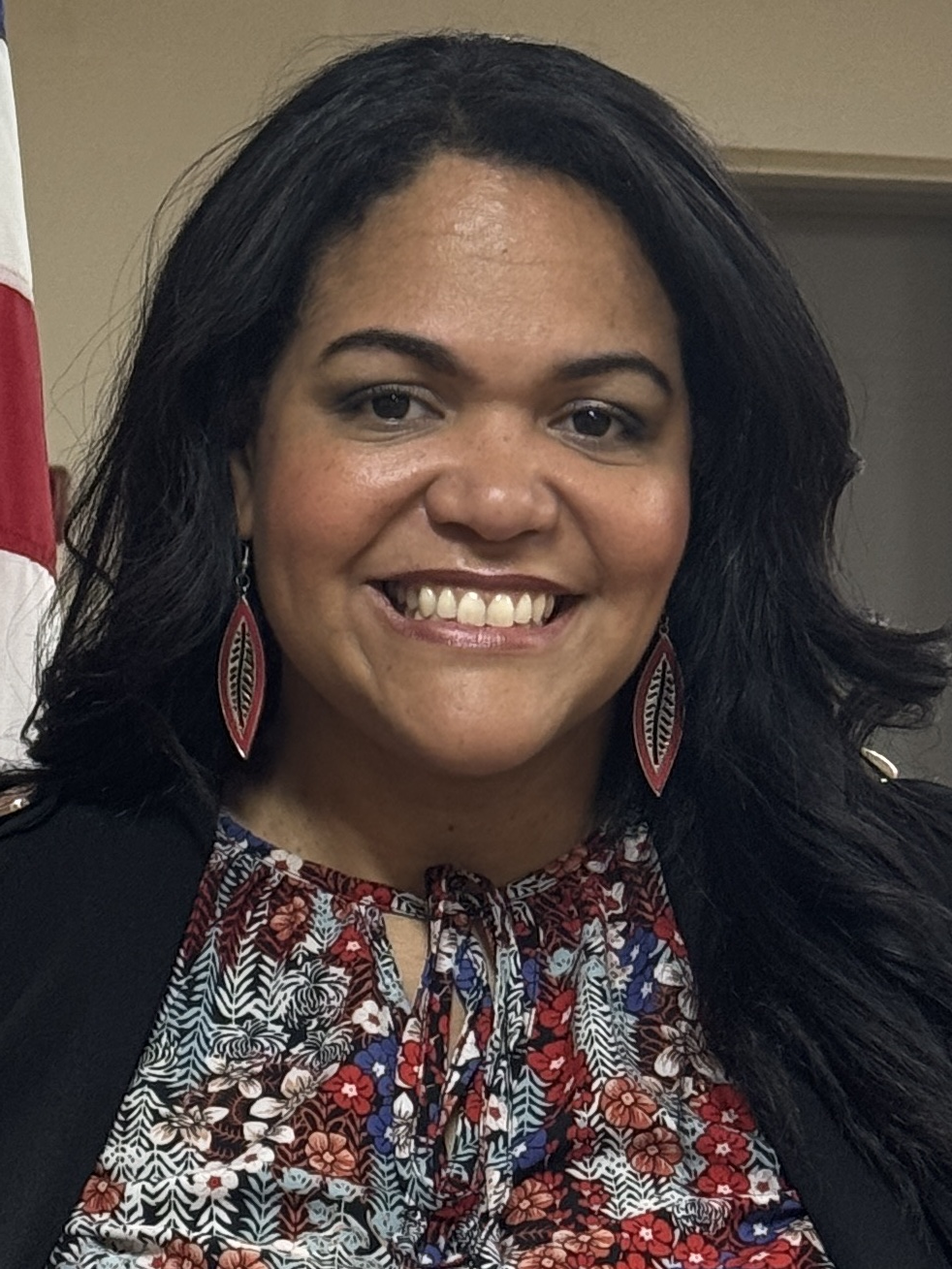
Candidate	Arthur Ellis	Michelle Talkington
Party	Democratic	Republican
Popular vote	30,168	14,765
Percentage	67.0%	32.8%
- Precinct results Ellis: 50–60% 60–70% 70–80% 80–90% >90% Talkington: 50–60% 60–70% 70–80%
State senator before election
Arthur Ellis
Democratic
Elected State senator
Arthur Ellis
Democratic

The new 28th district encompasses most of Charles County. First-term Democratic incumbent Arthur Ellis, who was elected in 2018 with 66.2% of the vote, ran for a second term.

==== Democratic primary ====
Maryland Matters identified the Democratic primary election in District 28 as a "race to watch".

Democratic primary results
Party	Candidate	Votes	%
Democratic	Arthur Ellis (incumbent)	10,426	68.4
Democratic	Vontasha R. Simms	4,827	31.6
Total votes		15,253	100.0

==== General election ====
2022 Maryland's 28th Senate district election
Party	Candidate	Votes	%	±%
Democratic	Arthur Ellis (incumbent)	30,168	67.04%	+0.87%
Republican	Michelle M. Talkington	14,765	32.81%	−0.75%
Write-in		64	0.14%	-0.11%
Total votes		44,997	100.00%	
Democratic hold				

=== District 29 ===
2022 Maryland Senate 29th District election
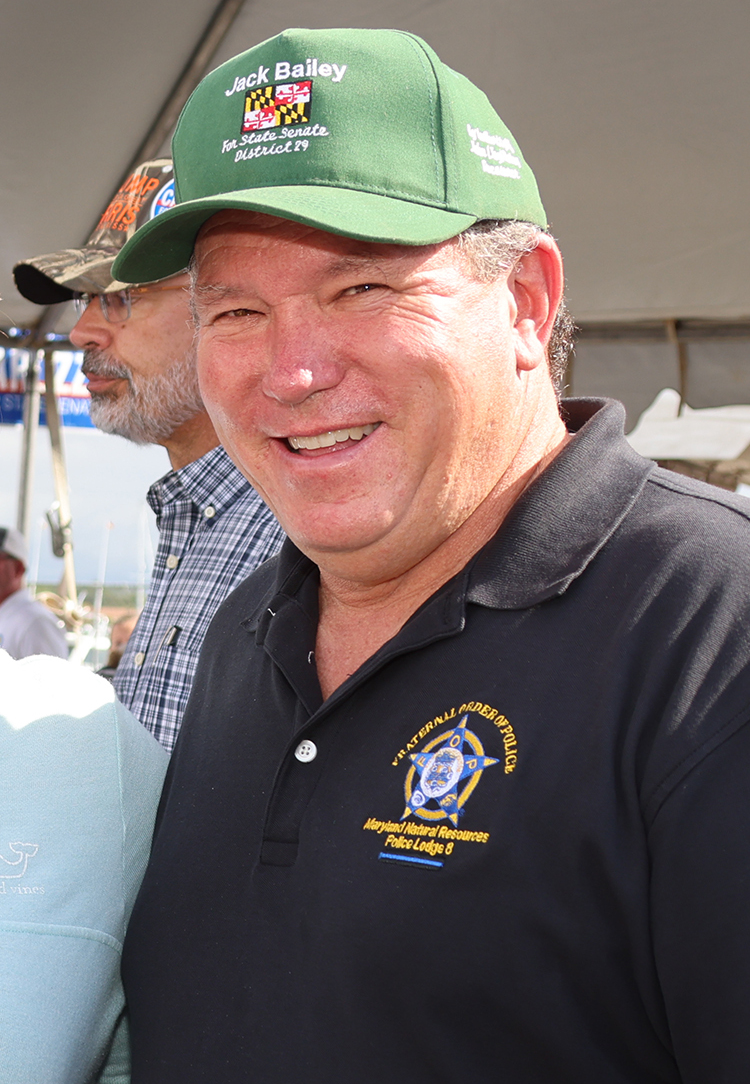
Candidate	Jack Bailey
Party	Republican
Popular vote	33,101
Percentage	96.4%
- Precinct results Bailey: >90%
State senator before election
Jack Bailey
Republican
Elected State senator
Jack Bailey
Republican

The new 29th district encompasses all of St. Mary's County and south Calvert County. First-term Republican incumbent Jack Bailey, who was elected in 2018 with 60.2% of the vote, ran for a second term, unopposed.

2022 Maryland's 29th Senate district election
Party	Candidate	Votes	%	±%
Republican	Jack Bailey (incumbent)	33,101	96.35%	+36.14%
Write-in		1,254	3.65%	+3.45%
Total votes		34,355	100.00%	
Republican hold				

=== District 30 ===
2022 Maryland Senate 30th District election
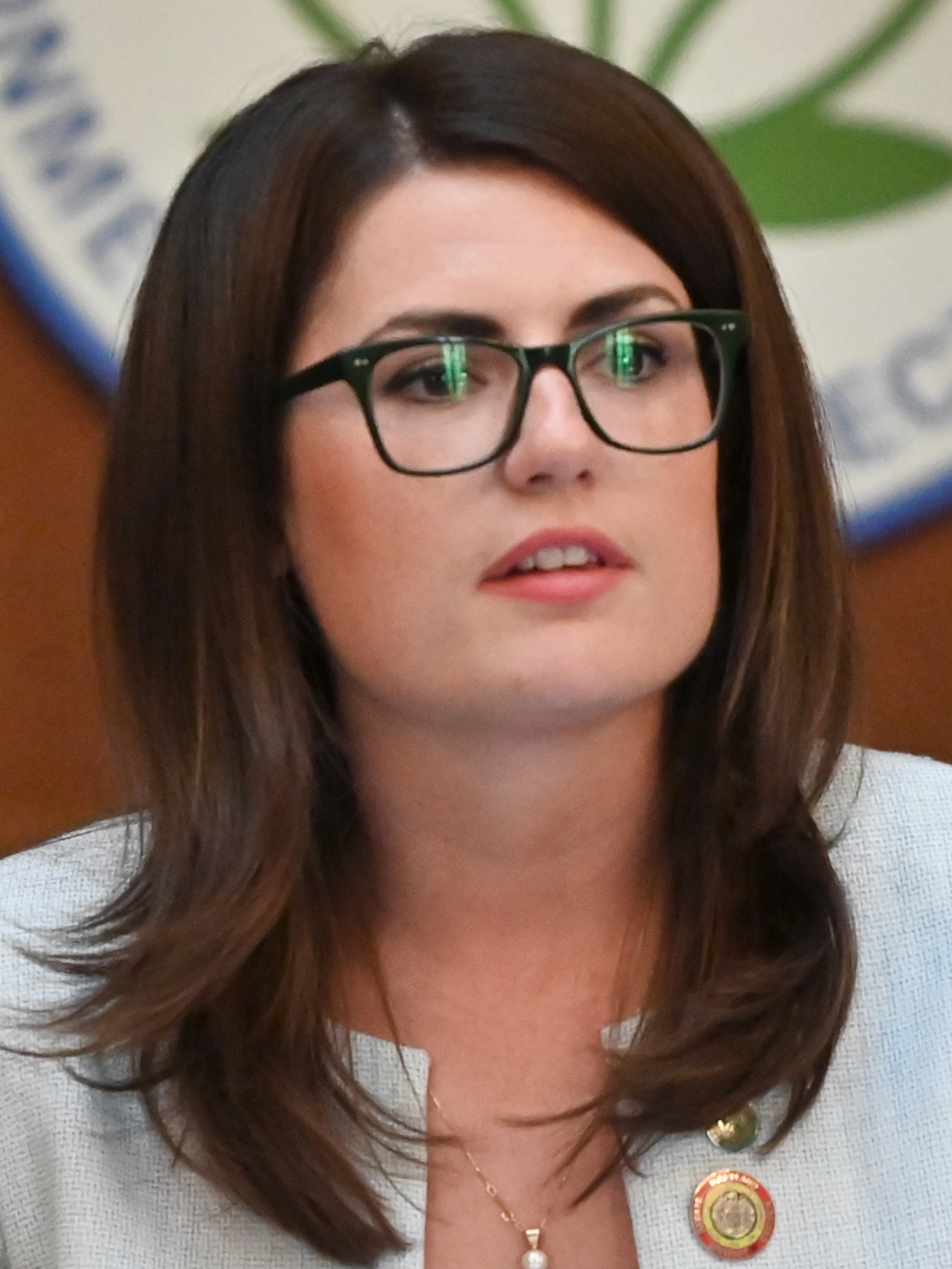

Candidate	Sarah Elfreth	Stacie MacDonald
Party	Democratic	Republican
Popular vote	30,359	22,489
Percentage	57.4%	42.5%
- Precinct results Elfreth: 50–60% 60–70% 70–80% 80–90% MacDonald: 50–60% 60–70%
State senator before election
Sarah Elfreth
Democratic
Elected State senator
Sarah Elfreth
Democratic

The new 30th district encompasses south Anne Arundel County, including the state capital, Annapolis. First-term Democratic incumbent Sarah Elfreth, who was elected in 2018 with 53.8% of the vote, ran for a second term.

==== Republican primary ====
Republican primary results
Party	Candidate	Votes	%
Republican	Stacie MacDonald	5,945	74.7
Republican	Bobbi A. Moore	2,012	25.3
Total votes		7,957	100.0

==== General election ====
2022 Maryland's 30th Senate district election
Party	Candidate	Votes	%	±%
Democratic	Sarah Elfreth (incumbent)	30,359	57.39%	+3.56%
Republican	Stacie MacDonald	22,489	42.51%	−2.09%
Write-in		49	0.09%	+0.02%
Total votes		52,897	100.00%	
Democratic hold				

=== District 31 ===
2022 Maryland Senate 31st District election
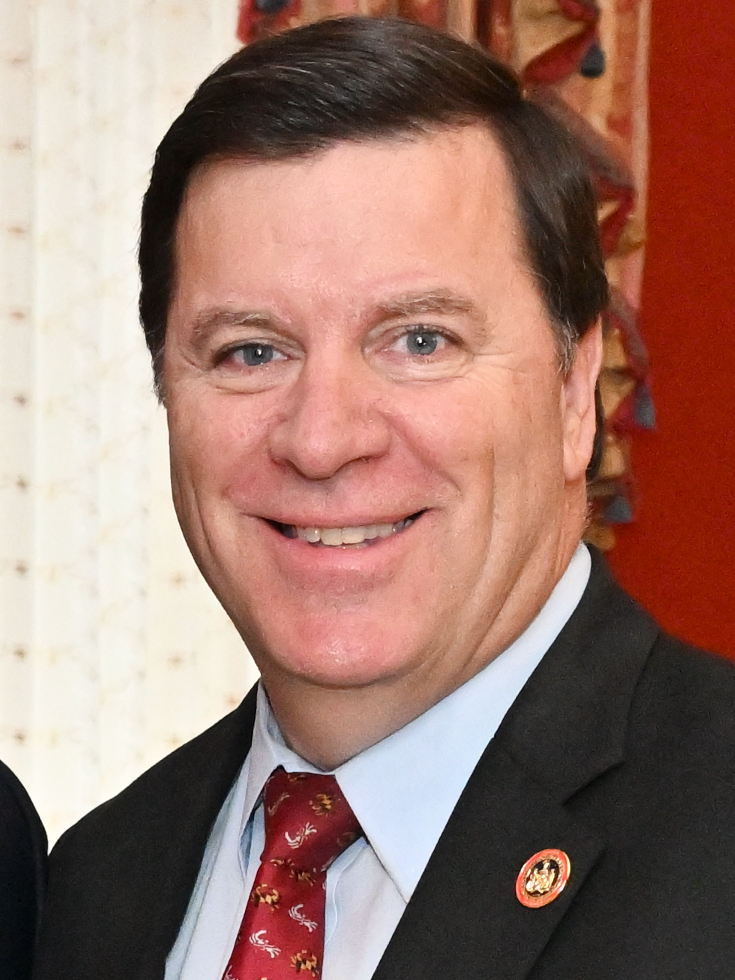

Candidate	Bryan Simonaire	Brian Kunkoski
Party	Republican	Libertarian
Popular vote	32,215	12,318
Percentage	71.3%	27.2%
- Precinct results Simonaire: 50–60% 60–70% 70–80% 80–90% Kunkoski: 50–60%
State senator before election
Bryan Simonaire
Democratic
Elected State senator
Bryan Simonaire
Democratic

The new 31st district encompasses north Anne Arundel County, including Pasadena, Severn, and Gambrills. Four-term Republican incumbent Bryan Simonaire, who was re-elected in 2018 with 61.0% of the vote, ran for a fifth term.

2022 Maryland's 31st Senate district election
Party	Candidate	Votes	%	±%
Republican	Bryan Simonaire (incumbent)	32,215	71.25%	+10.23%
Libertarian	Brian W. Kunkoski	12,318	27.24%	N/A
Write-in		681	1.51%	+1.38%
Total votes		45,214	100.00%	
Republican hold				

=== District 32 ===
2022 Maryland Senate 32nd District election
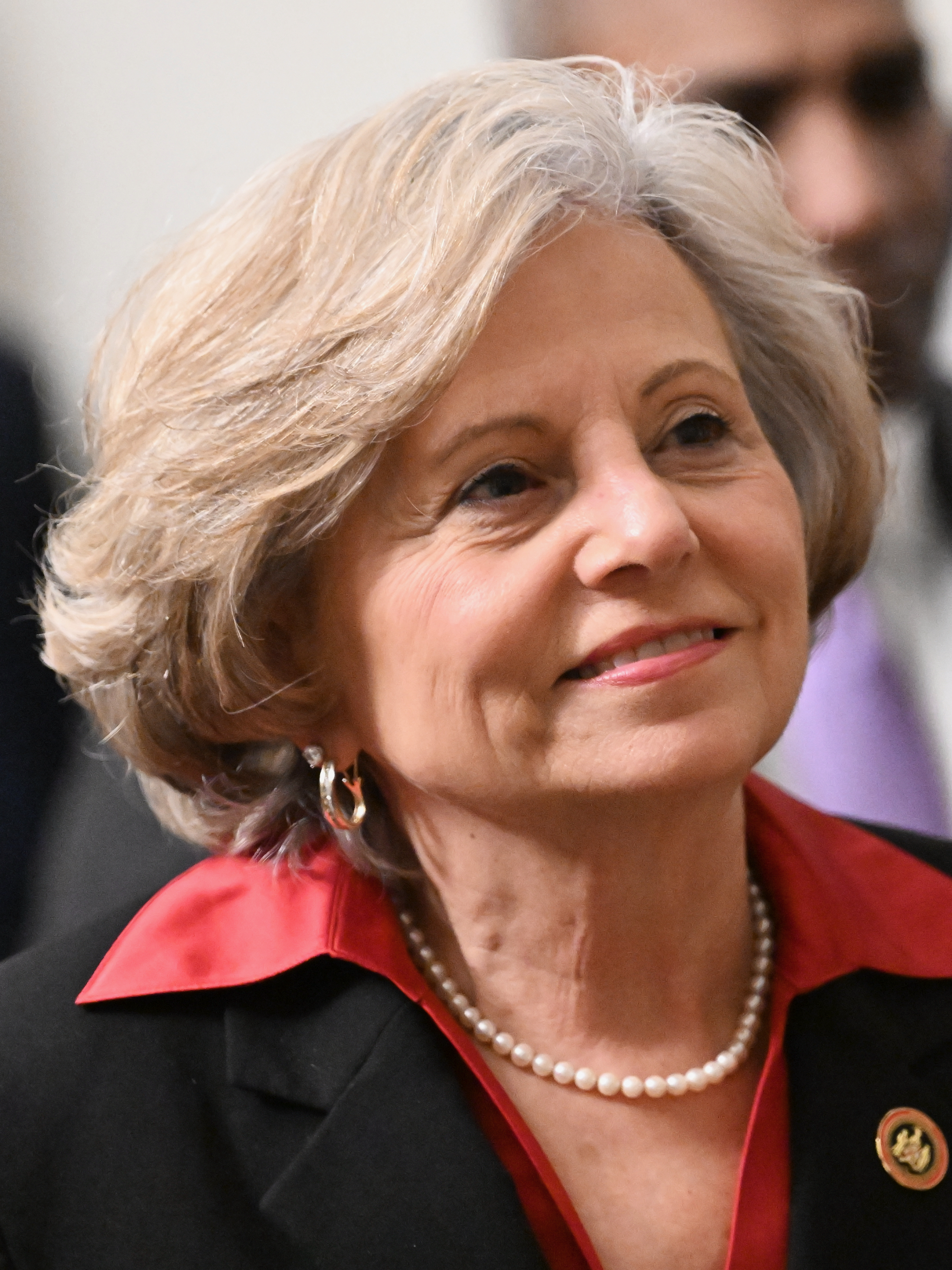

Candidate	Pamela Beidle	Kimberly June
Party	Democratic	Republican
Popular vote	23,380	12,103
Percentage	65.8%	34.0%
- Precinct results Beidle: 50–60% 60–70% 70–80% 80–90% June: 50–60%
State senator before election
Pamela Beidle
Democratic
Elected State senator
Pamela Beidle
Democratic

The new 32nd district encompasses part of north Anne Arundel County, including Glen Burnie and Fort Meade. First-term Democratic incumbent Pamela Beidle, who was elected in 2018 with 66.4% of the vote, ran for a second term.

==== Democratic primary ====
Maryland Matters identified the Democratic primary election in District 32 as a "race to watch".

Democratic primary results
Party	Candidate	Votes	%
Democratic	Pamela Beidle (incumbent)	6,620	68.2
Democratic	Sarah F. Lacey	3,090	31.8
Total votes		9,710	100.0

==== General election ====
2022 Maryland's 32nd Senate district election
Party	Candidate	Votes	%	±%
Democratic	Pamela Beidle (incumbent)	23,380	65.75%	−0.65%
Republican	Kimberly Ann June	12,103	34.04%	+0.59%
Write-in		76	0.21%	+0.06%
Total votes		35,559	100.00%	
Democratic hold				

=== District 33 ===
2022 Maryland Senate 33rd District election
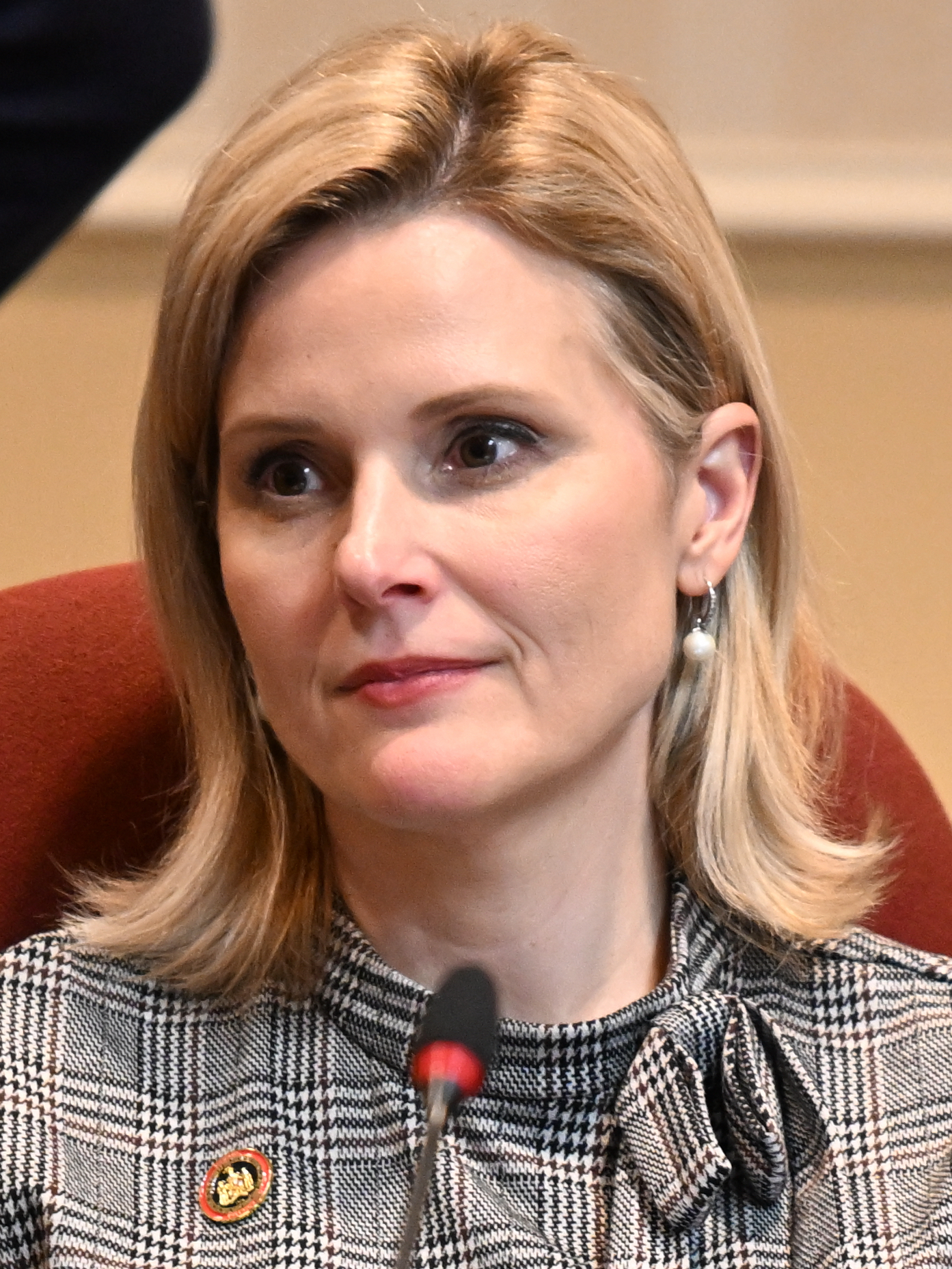

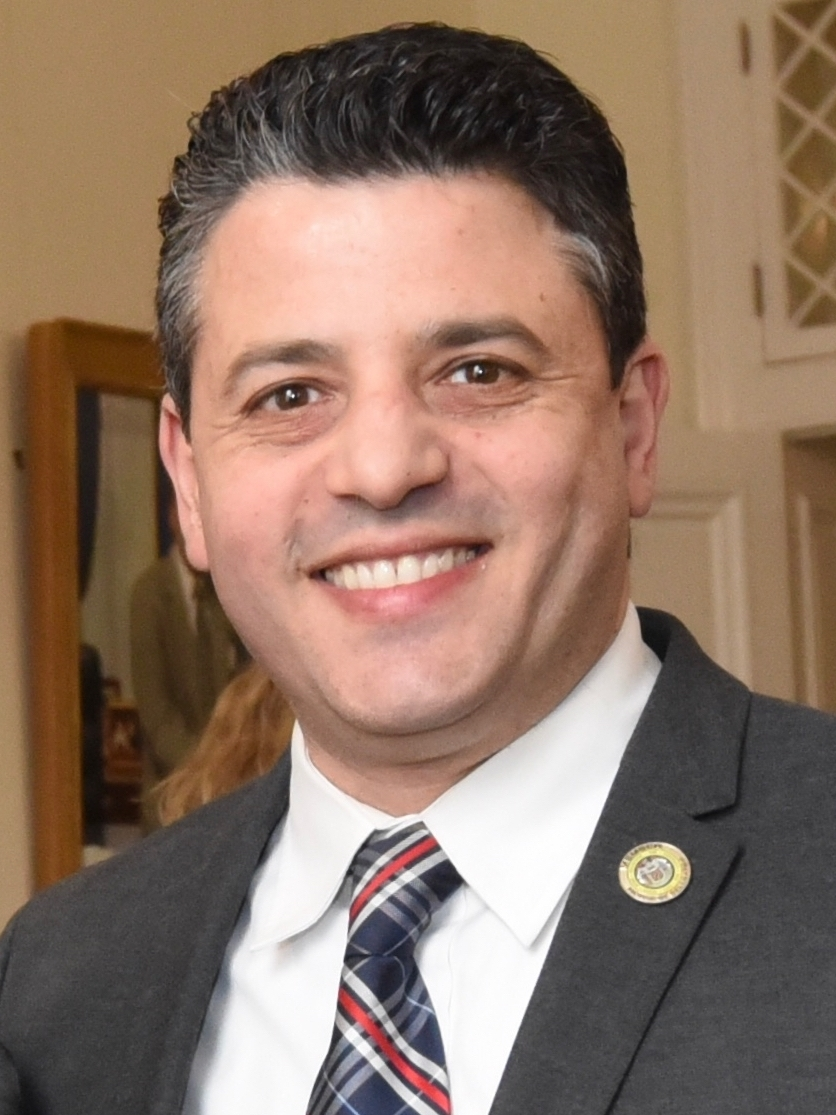
Candidate	Dawn Gile	Sid Saab
Party	Democratic	Republican
Popular vote	30,807	24,730
Percentage	55.4%	44.5%
- Precinct results Gile: 50–60% 60–70% 70–80% 80–90% Saab: 50–60% >90%
State senator before election
Edward R. Reilly
Republican
Elected State senator
Dawn Gile
Democratic

The new 33rd district encompasses central Anne Arundel County, including Cape St. Claire, Severna Park, Odenton, and Crofton. Three-term Republican incumbent Edward R. Reilly, who was re-elected in 2018 with 53.5% of the vote, initially filed to run for re-election, but announced on April 18, 2022, that he would not seek re-election to a fourth term.

2022 Maryland's 33rd Senate district election
Party	Candidate	Votes	%	±%
Democratic	Dawn Gile	30,807	55.41%	+8.97%
Republican	Sid Saab	24,730	44.48%	−9.00%
Write-in		60	0.11%	+0.03%
Total votes		55,597	100.00%	
Democratic gain from Republican				

=== District 34 ===
2022 Maryland Senate 34th District election
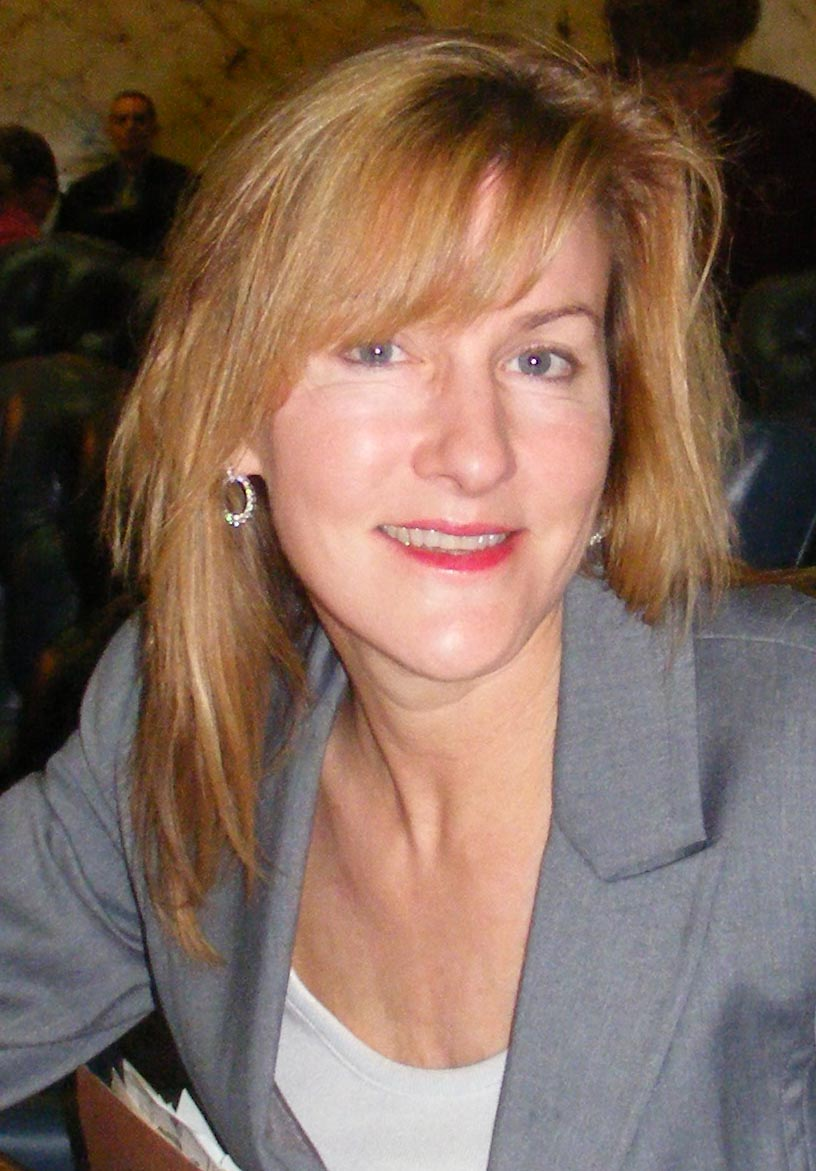

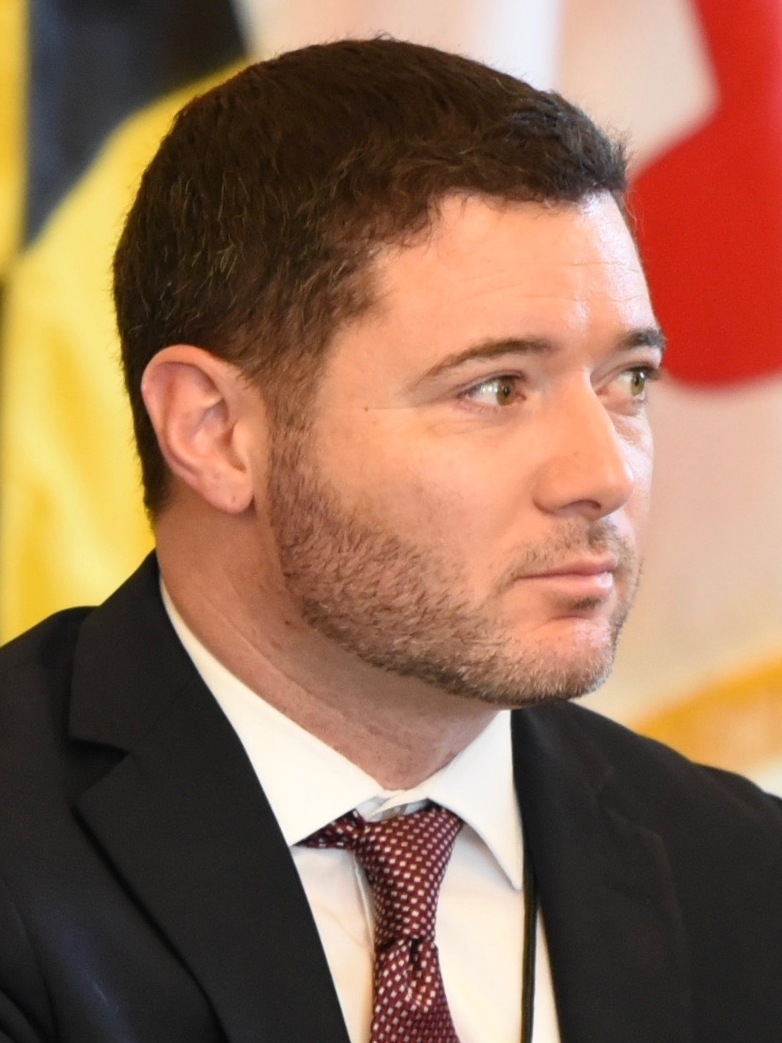
Candidate	Mary-Dulany James	Christian Miele
Party	Democratic	Republican
Popular vote	22,858	22,267
Percentage	50.6%	49.2%
- Precinct results James: 50–60% 60–70% 70–80% Miele: 40–50% 50–60% 60–70%
State senator before election
Bob Cassilly
Republican
Elected State senator
Mary-Dulany James
Democratic

The new 34th district encompasses south Harford County, including Aberdeen, Edgewood, and Havre de Grace. Two-term incumbent Robert Cassilly, who was re-elected in 2018 with 50.1% of the vote, announced on April 28, 2021, that he would run for Harford County executive instead of seeking a third term.

Maryland Matters identified both the Democratic and Republican primary elections in District 34 as a "race to watch".

==== Republican primary ====
Republican primary results
Party	Candidate	Votes	%
Republican	Christian Miele	7,317	73.7
Republican	Butch Tilley	2,616	26.3
Total votes		9,933	100.0

==== Democratic primary ====
Democratic primary results
Party	Candidate	Votes	%
Democratic	Mary-Dulany James	6,598	65.6
Democratic	Mary Ann Lisanti	3,453	34.4
Total votes		10,051	100.0

==== General election ====
2022 Maryland's 34th Senate district election
Party	Candidate	Votes	%	±%
Democratic	Mary-Dulany James	22,858	50.55%	+0.83%
Republican	Christian Miele	22,267	49.24%	−0.87%
Write-in		98	0.22%	+0.04%
Total votes		45,223	100.00%	
Democratic gain from Republican				

=== District 35 ===
2022 Maryland Senate 35th District election
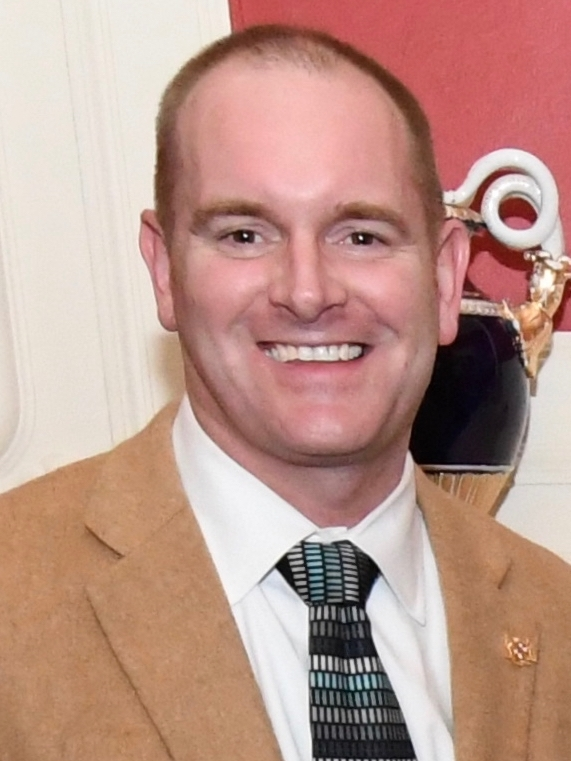
Candidate	Jason C. Gallion
Party	Republican
Popular vote	42,913
Percentage	96.9%
- Precinct results Gallion: >90%
State senator before election
Jason C. Gallion
Republican
Elected State senator
Jason C. Gallion
Republican

The new 35th district encompasses north Harford and Cecil counties, including Rising Sun, North East, and Castleton. First-term Republican incumbent Jason C. Gallion, who was elected in 2018 with 67.3% of the vote, ran for a second term.

==== Republican primary ====
Republican primary results
Party	Candidate	Votes	%
Republican	Jason C. Gallion (incumbent)	8,334	49.4
Republican	Michelle Christman	4,853	28.8
Republican	Frank Esposito	3,685	21.8
Total votes		16,872	100.0

==== General election ====
2022 Maryland's 35th Senate district election
Party	Candidate	Votes	%	±%
Republican	Jason C. Gallion (incumbent)	42,913	96.86%	+29.59%
Write-in		1,391	3.14%	+2.70%
Total votes		44,304	100.00%	
Republican hold				

=== District 36 ===
2022 Maryland Senate 36th District election
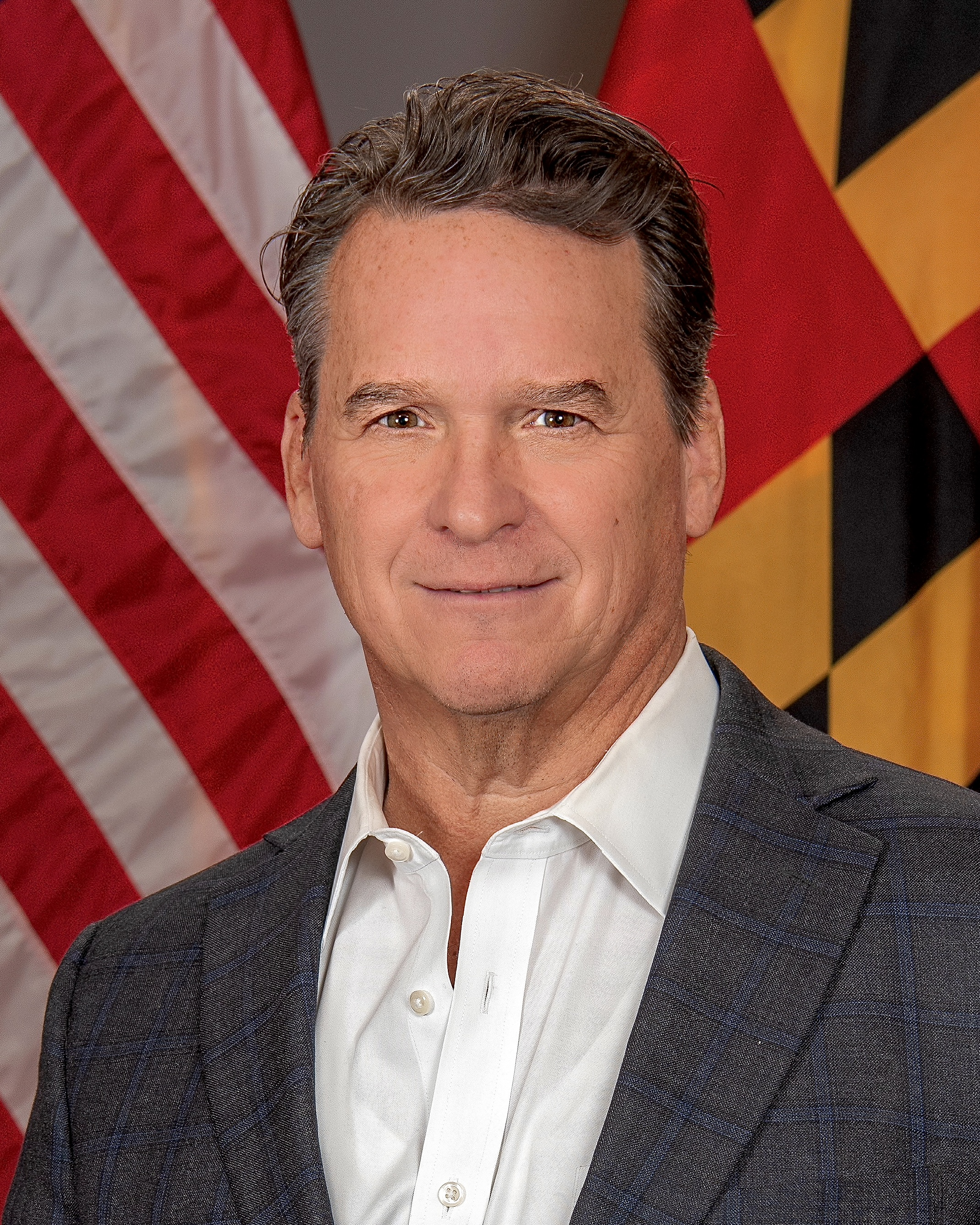
Candidate	Steve Hershey
Party	Republican
Popular vote	36,806
Percentage	96.3%
- Precinct results Hershey: >90%
State senator before election
Steve Hershey
Republican
Elected State senator
Steve Hershey
Republican

The new 36th district encompasses all of Kent and Queen Anne's counties, and parts of Cecil and Caroline counties, including Elkton. Two-term Republican incumbent Steve Hershey, who was re-elected in 2018 with 65.1% of the vote, ran for a third term.

==== Republican primary ====
Republican primary results
Party	Candidate	Votes	%
Republican	Steve Hershey (incumbent)	8,119	65.5
Republican	Rick Bowers	2,837	22.9
Republican	Heather Lynette Sinclair	1,439	11.6
Total votes		12,395	100.0

==== General election ====
2022 Maryland's 36th Senate district election
Party	Candidate	Votes	%	±%
Republican	Steve Hershey (incumbent)	36,806	96.28%	+31.20%
Write-in		1,424	3.72%	+3.66%
Total votes		38,230	100.00%	
Republican hold				

=== District 37 ===
2022 Maryland Senate 37th District election
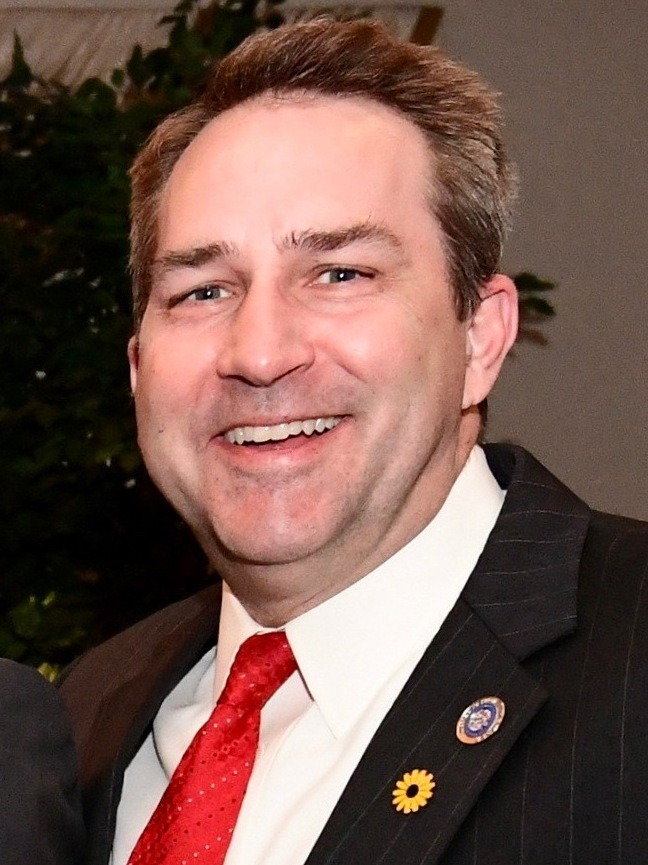

Candidate	Johnny Mautz	Naomi Hyman
Party	Republican	Democratic
Popular vote	29,432	18,930
Percentage	60.8%	39.1%
- Precinct results Mautz: 50–60% 60–70% 70–80% 80–90% >90% Hyman: 50–60% 60–70% 70–80% 80–90% >90%
State senator before election
Adelaide C. Eckardt
Republican
Elected State senator
Johnny Mautz
Republican

The new 37th district encompasses all of Talbot and Dorchester counties, and parts of Caroline and Wicomico counties, including Cambridge, Easton, Federalsburg, and parts of Salisbury. Two-term Republican incumbent Adelaide C. Eckardt, who was re-elected in 2018 with 59.9% of the vote, ran for a third term.

==== Republican primary ====
Maryland Matters identified the Republican primary election in District 37 as a "race to watch".

Republican primary results
Party	Candidate	Votes	%
Republican	Johnny Mautz	10,128	74.1
Republican	Adelaide C. Eckardt (incumbent)	3,535	25.9
Total votes		13,663	100.0

==== General election ====
2022 Maryland's 37th Senate district election
Party	Candidate	Votes	%	±%
Republican	Johnny Mautz	29,432	60.80%	+0.88%
Democratic	Naomi Hyman	18,930	39.10%	−0.86%
Write-in		47	0.10%	+0.02%
Total votes		48,409	100.00%	
Republican hold				

=== District 38 ===
2022 Maryland Senate 38th District election
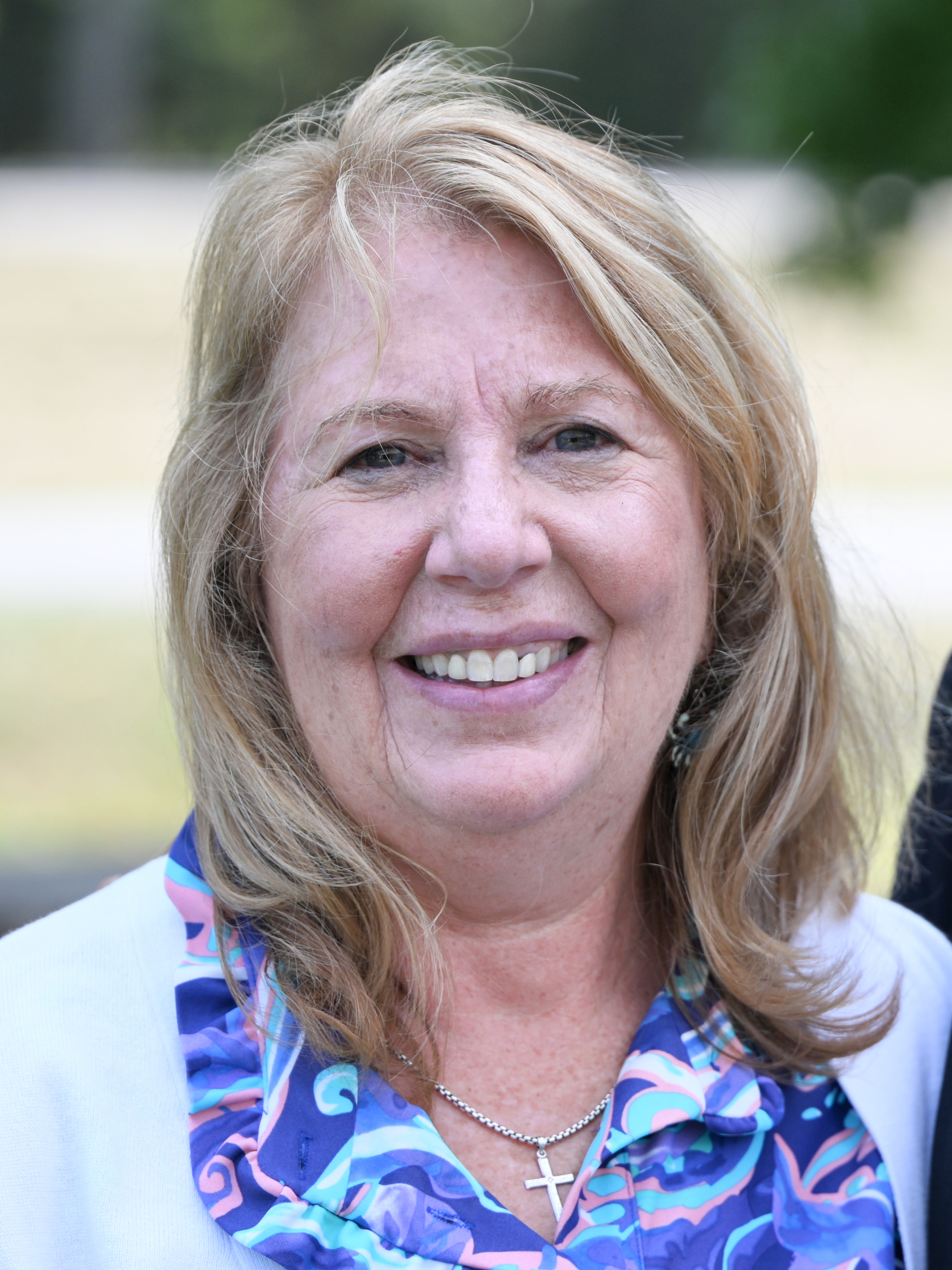

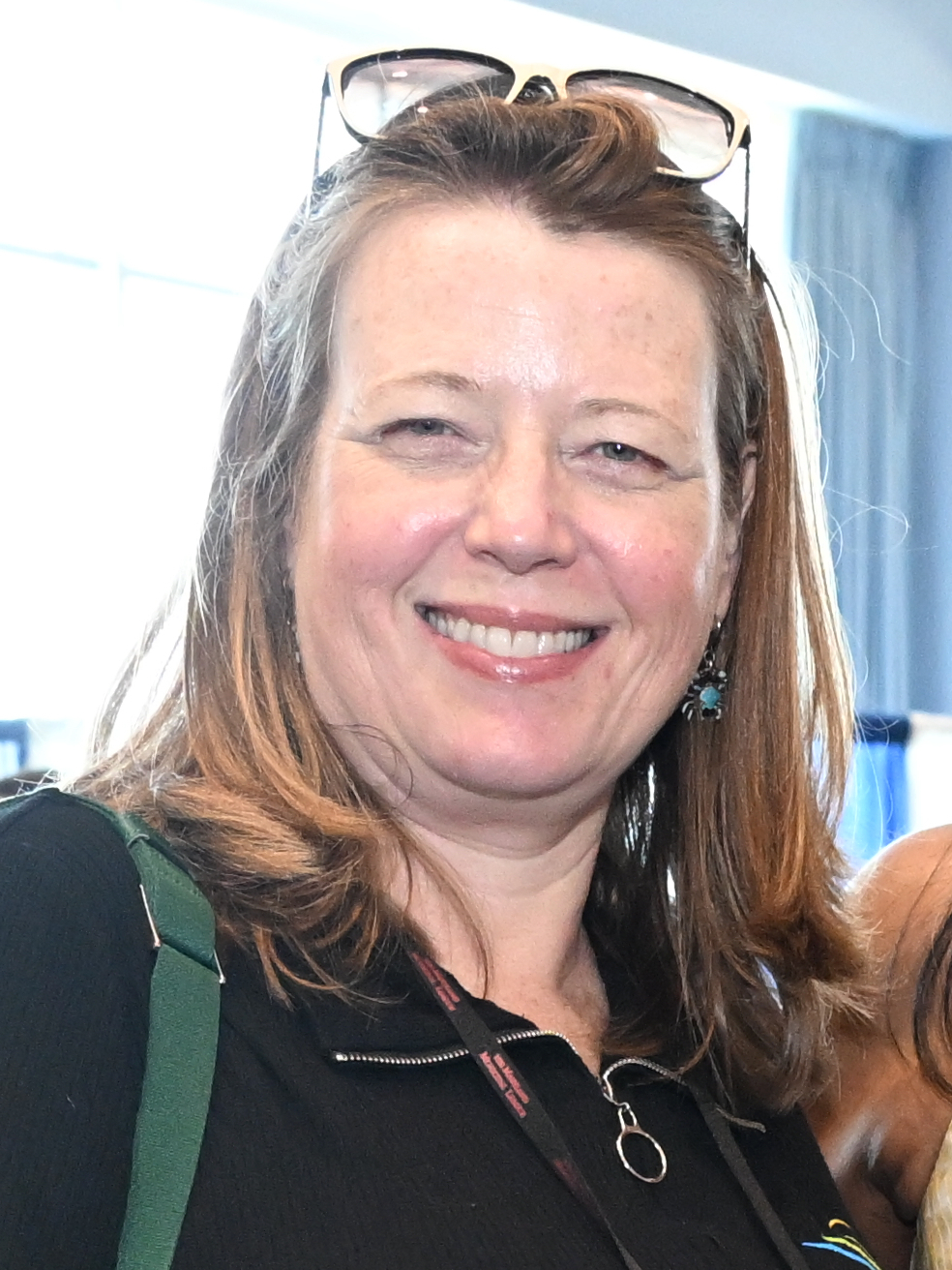
Candidate	Mary Beth Carozza	Michele Gregory
Party	Republican	Democratic
Popular vote	32,277	16,273
Percentage	66.4%	33.5%
- Precinct results Carozza: 50–60% 60–70% 70–80% 80–90% >90% Gregory: 50–60% 60–70% 80–90%
State senator before election
Mary Beth Carozza
Republican
Elected State senator
Mary Beth Carozza
Republican

The new 38th district encompasses all of Worcester and Somerset counties, and part of Wicomico County, including Ocean City, Pocomoke City, Princess Anne, and part of Salisbury. First-term Republican incumbent Mary Beth Carozza, who was elected in 2018 with 52.6% of the vote, ran for a second term.

2022 Maryland's 38th Senate district election
Party	Candidate	Votes	%	±%
Republican	Mary Beth Carozza (incumbent)	32,277	66.42%	+13.77%
Democratic	Michele Gregory	16,273	33.49%	−13.77%
Write-in		45	0.09%	0.00%
Total votes		48,595	100.00%	
Republican hold				

=== District 39 ===
2022 Maryland Senate 35th District election
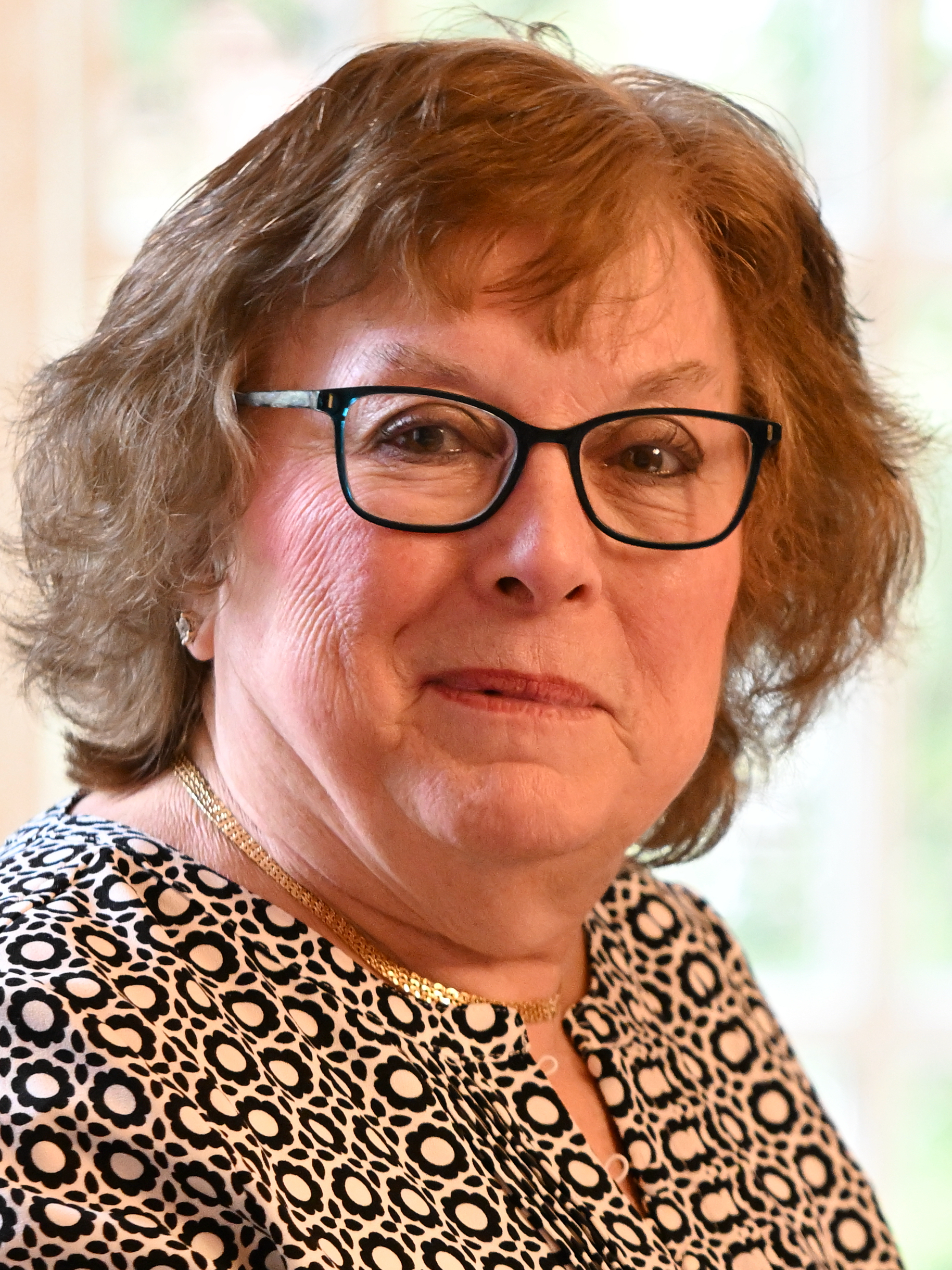

Candidate	Nancy J. King	Moshe Landman
Party	Democratic	Green
Popular vote	25,188	3,582
Percentage	86.2%	12.3%
- Precinct results King: 80–90%
State senator before election
Nancy J. King
Democratic
Elected State senator
Nancy J. King
Democratic

The new 39th district includes Montgomery Village and parts of Germantown and Clarksburg. Three-term Democratic incumbent Nancy J. King, who was re-elected in 2018 with 79.3% of the vote, ran for a fourth term.

==== Democratic primary ====
Democratic primary results
Party	Candidate	Votes	%
Democratic	Nancy J. King (incumbent)	8,662	81.1
Democratic	Adam Alphaeus Cunningham	2,024	18.9
Total votes		10,686	100.0

==== General election ====
2022 Maryland's 39th Senate district election
Party	Candidate	Votes	%	±%
Democratic	Nancy J. King (incumbent)	25,188	86.18	+6.93%
Green	Moshe Landman	3,582	12.26	N/A
Write-in		457	1.56	+1.43%
Total votes		29,227	100.00	
Democratic hold				

=== District 40 ===
2022 Maryland Senate 40th District election
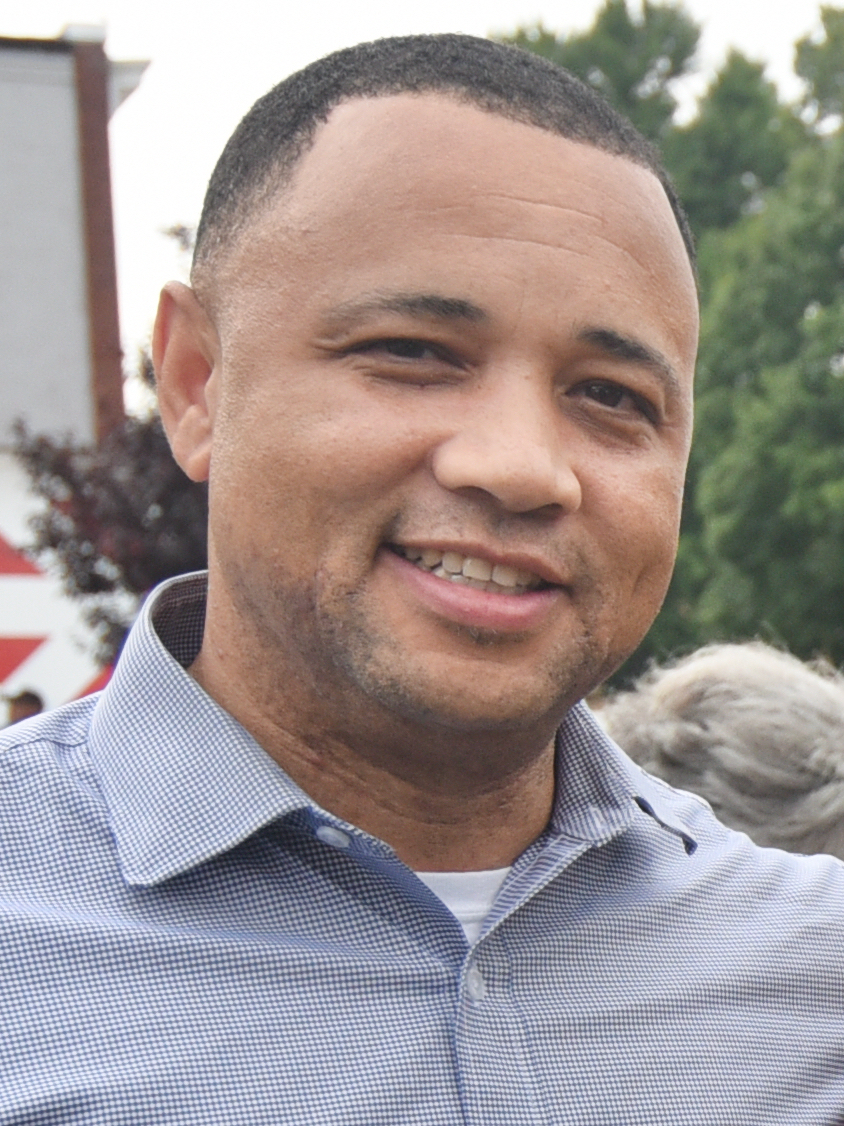

Candidate	Antonio Hayes	Christopher Anderson
Party	Democratic	Republican
Popular vote	24,236	2,058
Percentage	91.9%	7.8%
- Precinct results Hayes: 50–60% 70–80% 80–90% >90%
State senator before election
Antonio Hayes
Democratic
Elected State senator
Antonio Hayes
Democratic

The new 40th district encompasses communities in west Baltimore, including Morrell Park, Sandtown-Winchester, and Greenspring. First-term Democratic incumbent Antonio Hayes, who was elected in 2018 with 98.7% of the vote, ran for a second term.

2022 Maryland's 40th Senate district election
Party	Candidate	Votes	%	±%
Democratic	Antonio Hayes (incumbent)	24,236	91.94%	−6.78%
Republican	Christopher Anderson	2,058	7.81%	N/A
Write-in		66	0.25%	-1.03%
Total votes		26,360	100.00%	
Democratic hold				

=== District 41 ===
2022 Maryland Senate 41st District election
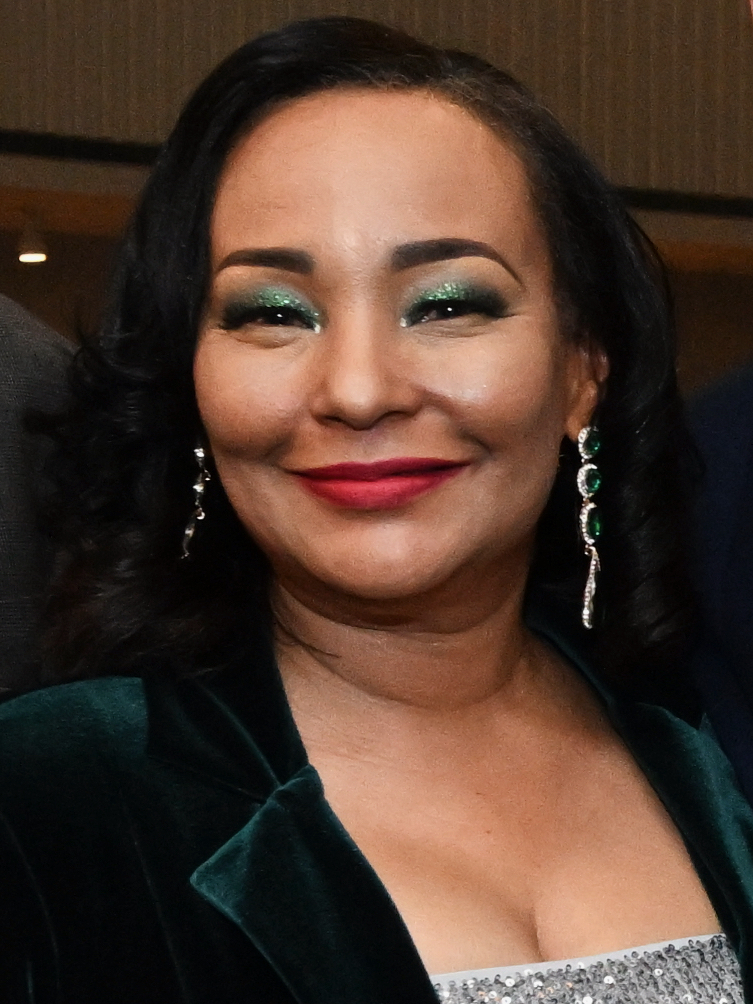
Candidate	Jill P. Carter
Party	Democratic
Popular vote	29,882
Percentage	98.2%
- Precinct results Carter: >90%
State senator before election
Jill P. Carter
Democratic
Elected State senator
Jill P. Carter
Democratic

The new 41st district encompasses communities in west Baltimore, including Wyndhurst, Yale Heights, and Edmondson. First-term Democratic incumbent Jill P. Carter, who was elected in 2018 with 98.2% of the vote, ran for a second term, unopposed.

2022 Maryland's 41st Senate district election
Party	Candidate	Votes	%	±%
Democratic	Jill P. Carter (incumbent)	29,882	98.20%	+0.02%
Write-in		547	1.80%	-0.02%
Total votes		30,429	100.00%	
Democratic hold				

=== District 42 ===
2022 Maryland Senate 42nd District election
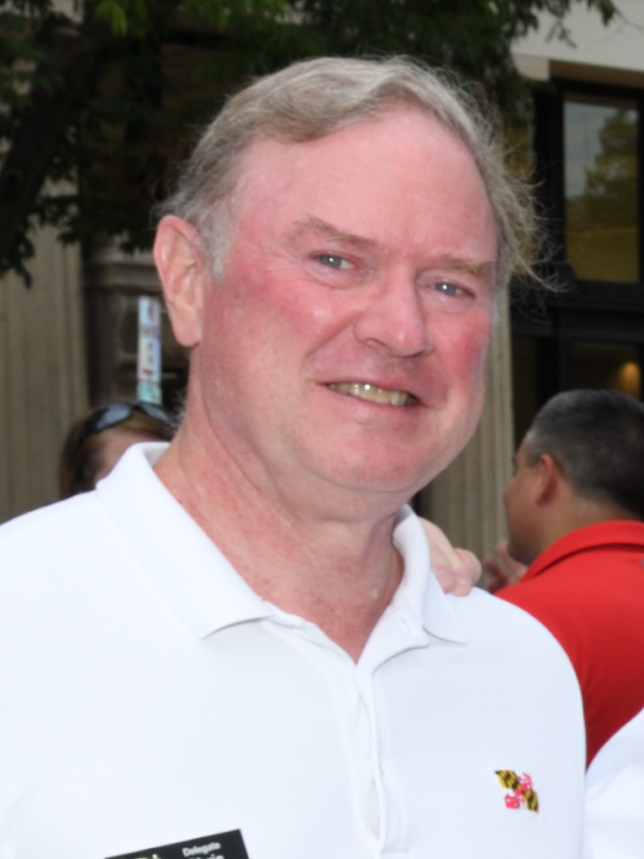
Candidate	Chris West
Party	Republican
Popular vote	37,944
Percentage	95.5%
- Precinct results West: 80–90% >90%
State senator before election
Chris West
Republican
Elected State senator
Chris West
Republican

The new 42nd district encompasses north Baltimore County, including Timonium, Parkton, and Hereford. First-term Republican incumbent Chris West, who was elected in 2018 with 51.0% of the vote, ran for a second term.

==== Republican primary ====
Republican primary results
Party	Candidate	Votes	%
Republican	Chris West (incumbent)	7,319	63.4
Republican	Jimmy Mathis	2,296	19.9
Republican	Zach Tomlin	1,932	16.7
Total votes		11,547	100.0

==== General election ====
2022 Maryland's 42nd Senate district election
Party	Candidate	Votes	%	±%
Republican	Chris West (incumbent)	37,944	95.51%	+44.54%
Write-in		1,785	4.49%	+4.41%
Total votes		39,729	100.00%	
Republican hold				

=== District 43 ===
2022 Maryland Senate 43rd District election
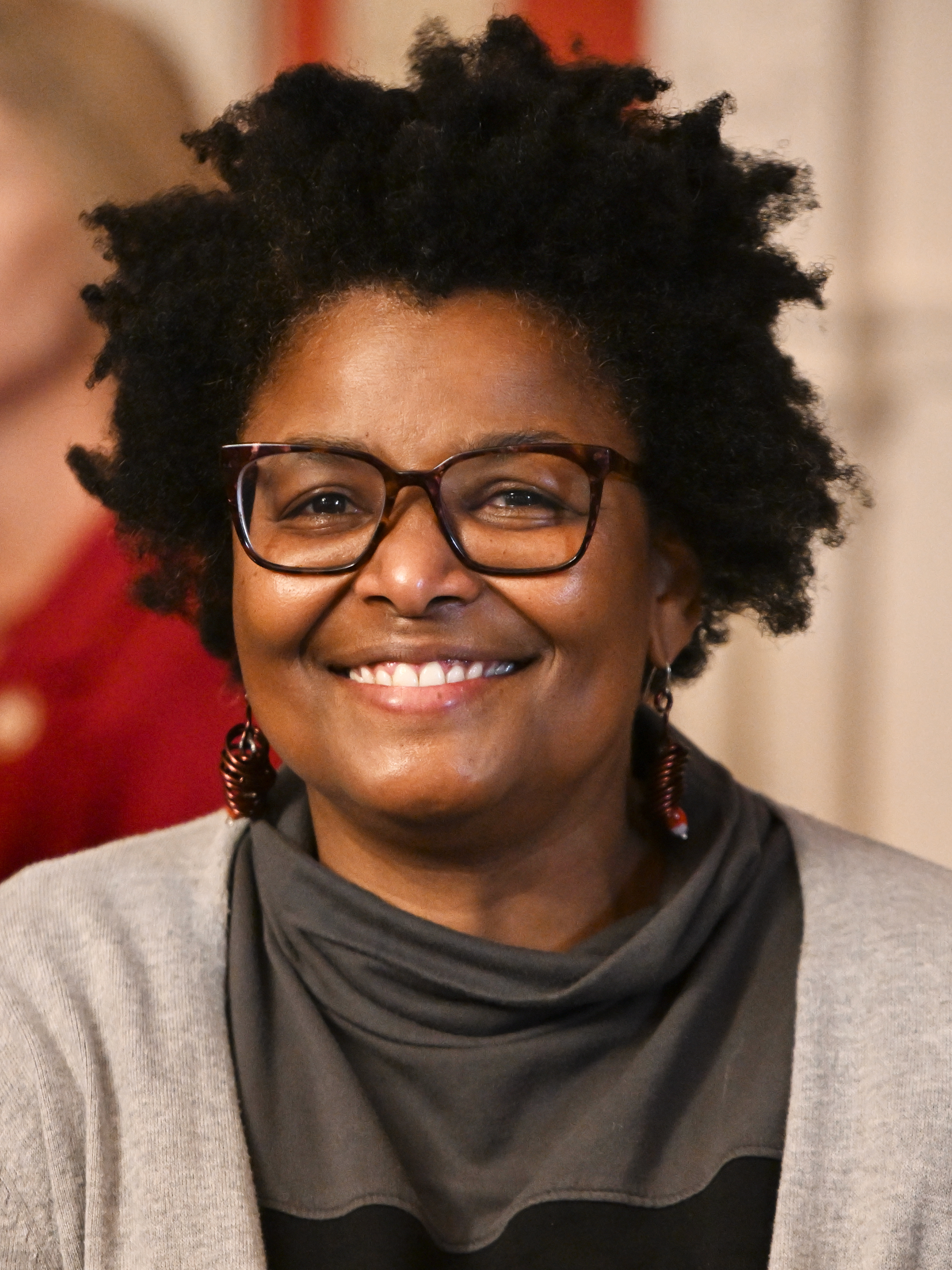

Candidate	Mary L. Washington	Robert Gemmill III
Party	Democratic	Libertarian
Popular vote	32,333	3,339
Percentage	90.3%	9.3%
- Precinct results Washington: 70–80% 80–90% >90%
State senator before election
Mary L. Washington
Democratic
Elected State senator
Mary L. Washington
Democratic

The new 43rd district encompasses parts of central Baltimore County and Baltimore, including Towson, Waverly, and Cameron Village. First-term Democratic incumbent Mary L. Washington, who was elected in 2018 with 98.8% of the vote, ran for a second term.

2022 Maryland's 43rd Senate district election
Party	Candidate	Votes	%	±%
Democratic	Mary L. Washington (incumbent)	32,333	90.31%	−8.52%
Libertarian	Robert Gemmill II	3,339	9.33%	N/A
Write-in		129	0.36%	-0.80%
Total votes		35,801	100.00%	
Democratic hold				

=== District 44 ===
2022 Maryland Senate 44th District election
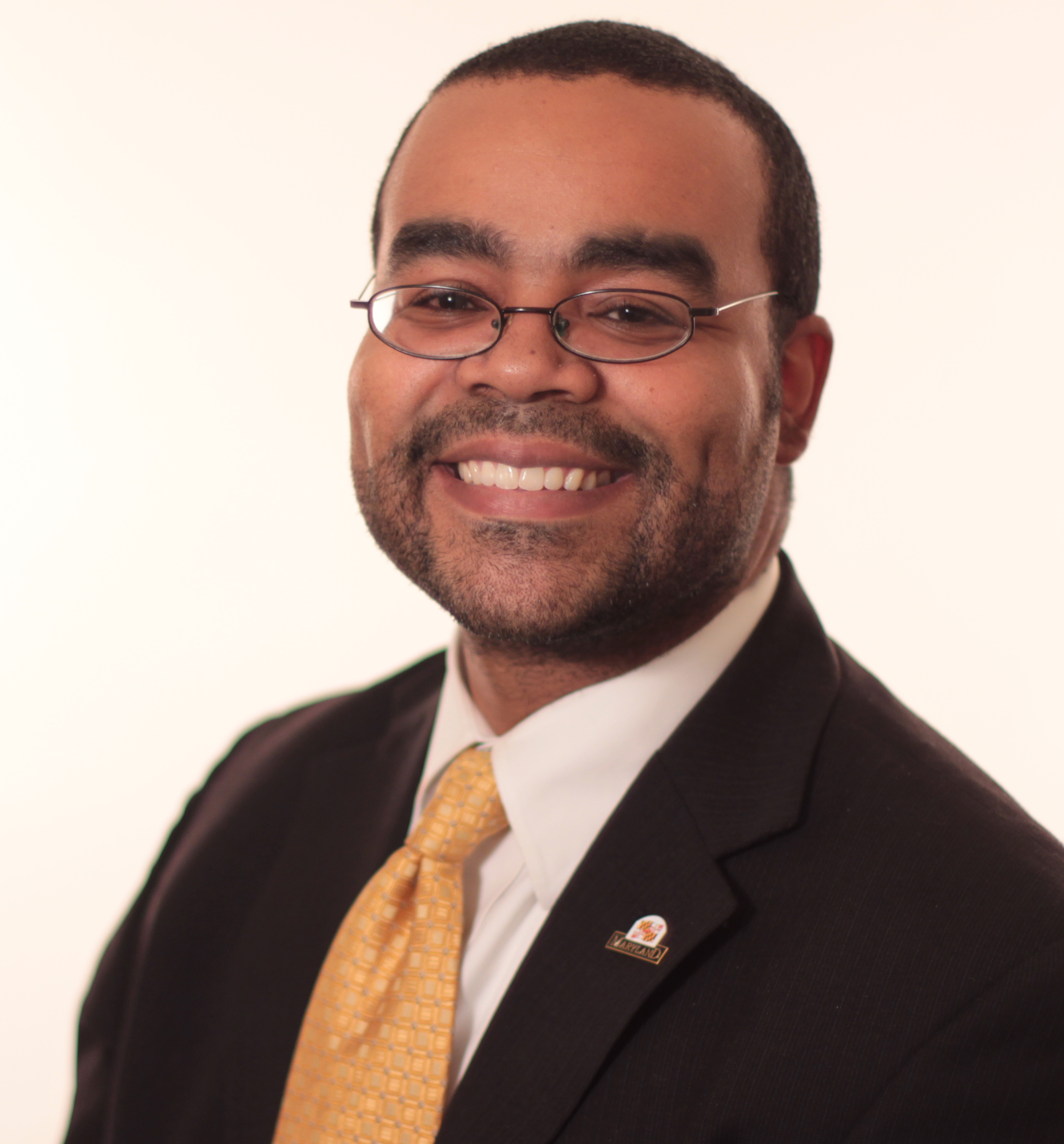
Candidate	Charles E. Sydnor III
Party	Democratic
Popular vote	30,699
Percentage	97.5%
- Precinct results Sydnor: 80–90% >90%
State senator before election
Charles E. Sydnor III
Democratic
Elected State senator
Charles E. Sydnor III
Democratic

The new 44th district encompasses parts of southwest Baltimore County surrounding Baltimore, including Woodlawn, Catonsville, and Landsowne. Democratic incumbent Charles E. Sydnor III ran for a full term after being appointed to the seat on January 8, 2020, following the resignation of Shirley Nathan-Pulliam, who was re-elected in 2018 with 84.5% of the vote.

==== Democratic primary ====
Democratic primary results
Party	Candidate	Votes	%
Democratic	Charles E. Sydnor III (incumbent)	12,938	82.6
Democratic	Ilyas Chohan	2,718	17.4
Total votes		15,656	100.0

==== General election ====
2022 Maryland's 44th Senate district election
Party	Candidate	Votes	%	±%
Democratic	Charles E. Sydnor III (incumbent)	30,699	97.48%	+12.94%
Write-in		792	2.52%	+2.31%
Total votes		31,491	100.00%	
Democratic hold				

=== District 45 ===
2022 Maryland Senate 45th District election
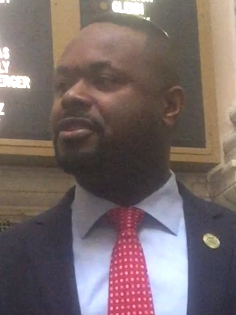
Candidate	Cory McCray
Party	Democratic
Popular vote	24,903
Percentage	98.8%
- Precinct results McCray: >90% Tie: 50%
State senator before election
Cory McCray
Democratic
Elected State senator
Cory McCray
Democratic

The new 45th district encompasses neighborhoods in central and east Baltimore, including Broadway East, Frankford, and Armistead Gardens. First-term Democratic incumbent Cory V. McCray, who was elected in 2018 with 98.8% of the vote, ran for a second term, unopposed.

2022 Maryland's 45th Senate district election
Party	Candidate	Votes	%	±%
Democratic	Cory V. McCray (incumbent)	24,903	98.80%	+0.05%
Write-in		302	1.20%	-0.05%
Total votes		25,205	100.00%	
Democratic hold				

=== District 46 ===
2022 Maryland Senate 46th District election
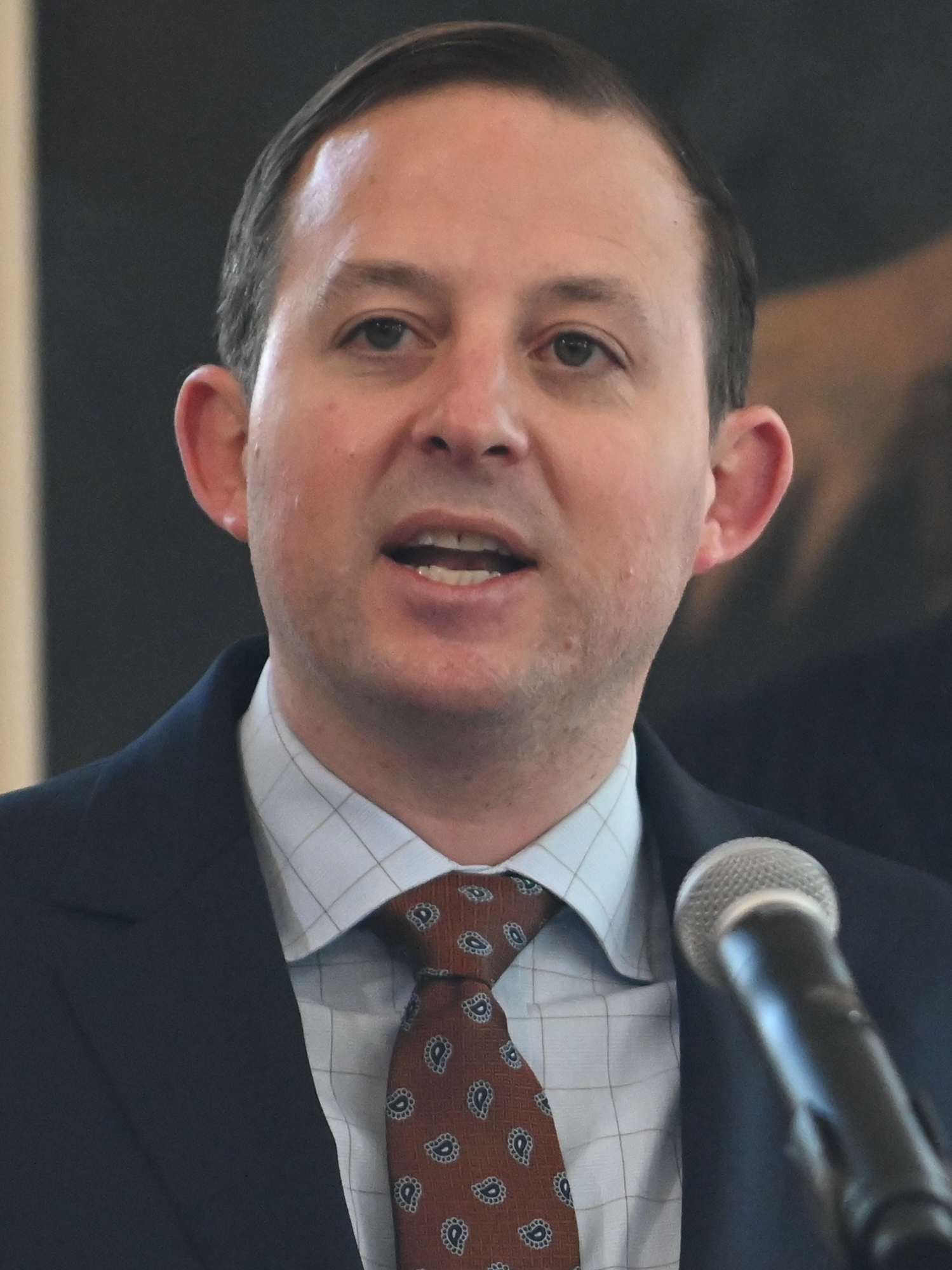

Candidate	Bill Ferguson	Emmanuel Digman
Party	Democratic	Republican
Popular vote	24,977	4,486
Percentage	84.6%	15.2%
- Precinct results Ferguson: 50–60% 60–70% 70–80% 80–90% >90% Digman: 50–60%
State senator before election
Bill Ferguson
Democratic
Elected State senator
Bill Ferguson
Democratic

The new 46th district encompasses neighborhoods in central and south Baltimore, including the Inner Harbor, Bayview, and Curtis Bay. Three-term Democratic incumbent and President of the Maryland Senate Bill Ferguson, who was re-elected in 2018 with 78.2% of the vote, ran for a fourth term.

2022 Maryland's 46th Senate district election
Party	Candidate	Votes	%	±%
Democratic	Bill Ferguson (incumbent)	24,977	84.63%	+6.41%
Republican	Emmanuel Digman	4,486	15.20%	−6.41%
Write-in		50	0.17%	-0.01%
Total votes		29,513	100.00%	
Democratic hold				

=== District 47 ===
2022 Maryland Senate 47th District election
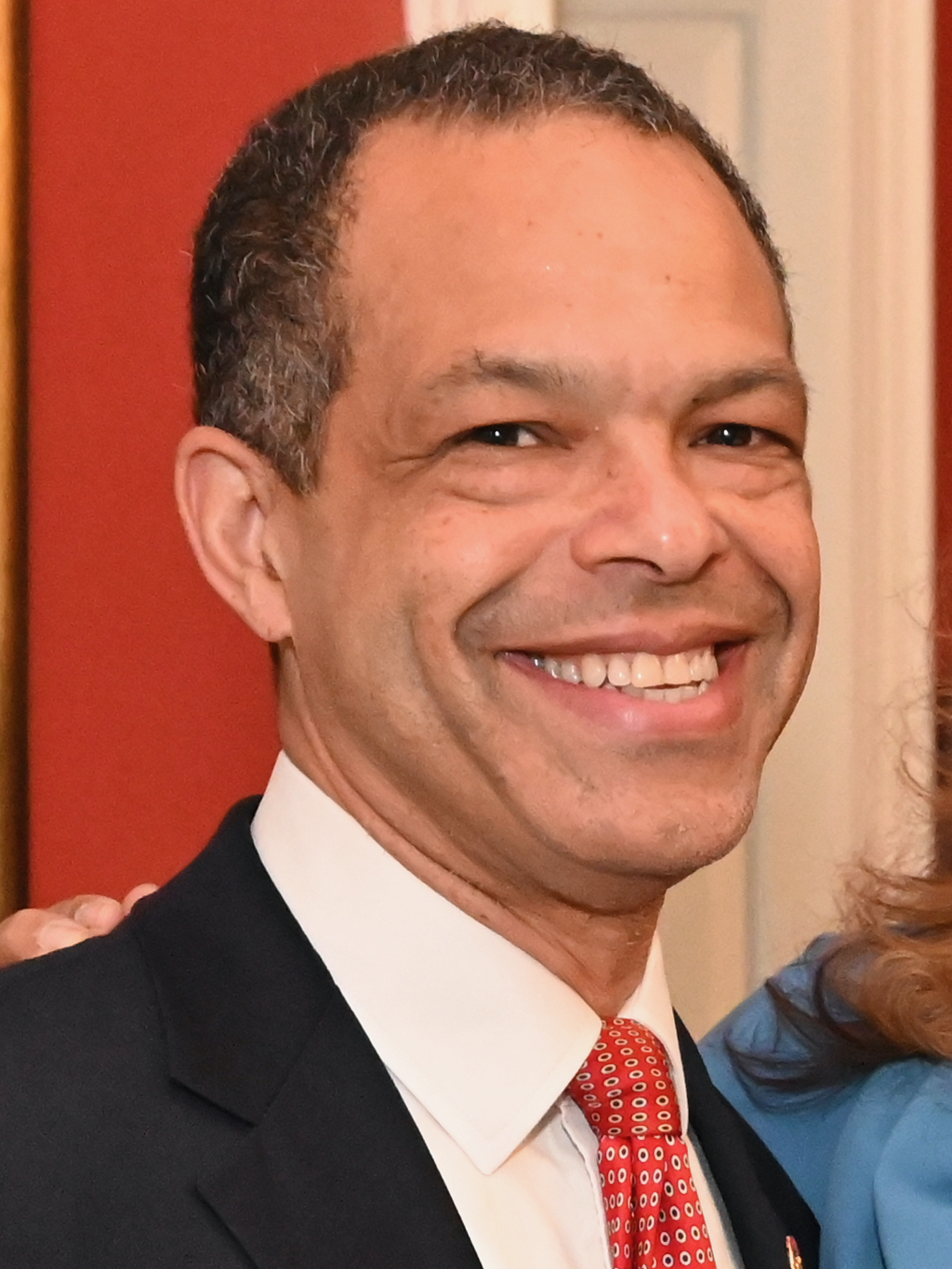
Candidate	Malcolm Augustine
Party	Democratic
Popular vote	16,416
Percentage	98.8%
- Precinct results Augustine: >90%
State senator before election
Malcolm Augustine
Democratic
Elected State senator
Malcolm Augustine
Democratic

The new 47th district encompasses parts of Prince George's County, including Chillum, Cheverly, and Landover. First-term Democratic incumbent Malcolm Augustine, who was elected in 2018 with 93.0% of the vote, ran for a second term.

==== Democratic primary ====
Democratic primary results
Party	Candidate	Votes	%
Democratic	Malcolm Augustine (incumbent)	7,452	78.4
Democratic	Rocio Treminio-Lopez	2,055	21.6
Total votes		9,507	100.0

==== General election ====
2022 Maryland's 47th Senate district election
Party	Candidate	Votes	%	±%
Democratic	Malcolm Augustine (incumbent)	16,416	98.78	+5.80%
Write-in		202	1.22	+1.09%
Total votes		16,618	100.00	
Democratic hold				

== See also ==
- Elections in Maryland
- 2022 United States elections
- 2022 Maryland gubernatorial election
- 2022 Maryland Attorney General election
- 2022 United States Senate election in Maryland
- 2022 Maryland Comptroller election
- 2022 United States House of Representatives elections in Maryland
- 2022 United States gubernatorial elections
- 2022 Maryland House of Delegates election
- List of Maryland General Assemblies
