= Tiffany Welch =

American politician (born 1984)

Member-elect of the Maryland House of Delegates from the 40th district
- Assuming office January 13, 2027
- Succeeding: Frank M. Conaway Jr.

Personal details
- Born: 1984 (age 41–42)
- Party: Democratic
- Education: University of Michigan (BA); University of Maryland, Baltimore (MA)

Tiffany Welch (born 1984) is an American politician who is a member-elect of the Maryland House of Delegates from the 40th district. She is a member of the Democratic Party.

== Early life and education ==
Welch was born in 1984. She is the daughter of William "Pete" Welch, who was a member of the Baltimore City Council from 2011 to 2016, and granddaughter of Agnes Welch, who served on the Baltimore City Council from 1983 to 2010. She grew up in the Easterwood neighborhood in west Baltimore, graduating from Bryn Mawr School before attending the University of Michigan, where she earned a Bachelor of Arts degree in sociology, and the University of Maryland, Baltimore, where she earned a Master of Arts degree in social work.

== Career ==
Welch worked as the director of family services for Head Start in Edmondson Village until 2011, afterwards working as a freelance project consultant who designed community projects for the Baltimore City Department of Recreation and Parks, Mondawmin Improvement Neighborhood Association, The Women's Civic League, and Youth Advocates Program Inc. She also co-founded #SaveADopeBoy, a youth organization that helps inner-city teenage boys earn money by helping people in the neighborhood and qualify for jobs at community businesses. Welch also worked as a healthy food access coordinator for No Boundaries Coalition, a resident advocacy group that offers fresh produce for sale in food deserts in west Baltimore. As of November 2021, she has worked as the director of administration and development for the Media Rhythm Institute.

Welch was a member of the 40th District Democratic Central Committee. In December 2016, after state delegate Barbara A. Robinson was appointed to the Maryland Senate, Welch applied to serve the remainder of Robinson's term in the Maryland House of Delegates. The Baltimore City Democratic Central Committee voted 4–3 to nominate former Baltimore city councilmember Nick Mosby to the seat in January 2017.

=== Maryland House of Delegates ===
In 2026, Welch ran for the Maryland House of Delegates in District 40. She defeated state delegate Frank M. Conaway Jr. in the Democratic primary on June 23, 2026, placing third behind incumbents Marlon Amprey and Melissa Wells with 21.8% of the vote. Welch, Amprey, and Wells ran unopposed in the general election. She was assigned to the Health Committee.

== Political positions ==
During her 2026 House of Delegates campaign, Welch said she supported unbundling government contracts and either decreasing or eliminating single-bid procurement options.
