= Harry Pratt =

Harry Pratt may refer to:

- Harry Emerson Pratt (1884–1957), American lawyer who served as a justice of the Alaska Territorial District Court
- Harry H. Pratt (1864–1932), U.S. Representative from New York
- Harry Rogers Pratt (1886–1956), professor of music and drama
- Harry Truman Pratt Sr. (1873–1945), American educator, artist, and civic leader

== See also ==
- Harry Pratt Judson (1849–1927), U.S. educator and historian
- Harriet Barnes Pratt (1878-1969), American philanthropist and horticulturist
- Henry Pratt (disambiguation)
- Harold Pratt (disambiguation)
