= Frank M. Conaway Sr. =

American politician (1933–2015)

Member of the Maryland House of Delegates from the 40th district
- In office 1971–1975
- In office 1979–1983

Personal details
- Born: March 16, 1933 Baltimore, Maryland, US
- Died: February 15, 2015 Baltimore, Maryland, US
- Party: Democratic (until 2014); Republican (after December 2014)
- Children: 2, including Frank Jr.

Frank M. Conaway Sr. (March 16, 1933 – February 15, 2015) was a politician, who represented the 40th district in the Maryland House of Delegates and served as the Baltimore City Clerk of the Maryland Circuit Court.

== Biography ==
Conaway was born in Baltimore, on March 16, 1933. He attended Frederick Douglass High School and received his B.A. from Morgan State University, a historically black college in Baltimore. He entered state politics at age 37, winning election to the Maryland House of Delegates in 1970. He did not win re-election in 1974, but did win a second nonconsecutive term in 1978. After his time in the House of Delegates, he won election as the Baltimore City Circuit Court Clerk, winning five terms. Conaway was a member of the Democratic Party for most of his career, but switched parties and became a Republican shortly before his death in office, on February 15, 2015, in Baltimore, saying that other Democratic officials in the city had ignored him. His son Frank Jr. went on to become a politician.
