= Shawn Z. Tarrant =

American politician

Member of the Maryland House of Delegates from the 40th district
- In office January 10, 2007 – January 14, 2015
- Preceded by: Catherine Pugh
- Succeeded by: Antonio Hayes

Personal details
- Born: July 30, 1965 (age 61) Freeport, New York, U.S.
- Party: Democratic
- Children: 2
- Education: Norfolk State University (BA)

Shawn Z. Tarrant (born July 30, 1965) is an American politician who served as a Maryland State Delegate for the 40th legislative district from January 10, 2007, to January 14, 2015. A member of the Democratic Party, he represented parts of Baltimore, Maryland. During his tenure, Tarrant served on the House Health and Government Operations Committee, including its Insurance Subcommittee, and was secretary of the Legislative Black Caucus of Maryland.

== Background ==
Tarrant graduated from Norfolk State University in 1989 with a Bachelor of Arts degree in finance/marketing. Tarrant worked at Bristol-Myers Squibb Company for 17 years (1992-2009), attaining the role of Director of Federal Government Affairs. In this role, he ensured patients with Medicaid as their insurance have access to medications sold by Bristol-Myers Squibb. In previous positions, he helped municipalities and cities conduct HIV/AIDS testing and awareness programs.

Tarrant is a member of the NSU Prince Georges Alumni Association Chapter. In 1985, Tarrant was initiated into the Epsilon Zeta chapter (NSU) of Kappa Alpha Psi fraternity. He is a life member of NSU National Alumni Association and Kappa Alpha Psi.

== Early career ==
Prior to running for office, he was the president of Ashburton Area Association from 1994 to 1999, a community improvement group in his neighborhood. He created several long-standing programs and has successfully achieved the re-zoning of Ashburton to an R-1 zone status (i.e., allowing single-family-only dwellings). He is a frequent speaker on improving housing and zoning codes. Tarrant served 6 terms as a PTO (Parent Teacher Organization) board member and vice president of the PTO at his children's public elementary school.

== Maryland House of Delegates ==
Tarrant's first session in the Maryland House of Delegates was 2007. He served for 8 years in the Maryland General Assembly, passing over 30 bills during his tenure. He led the initiative to increase taxes by 70% on cheap, candy-flavored cigars targeting urban youth. He has proposed a new legislation that protects student privacy by banning university coaches, faculty and administrators from asking students for their private user names and passwords. This legislation has become the policy for University of Maryland Systems.

== Tarrant in Baltimore ==
Tarrant was the president and vice president of his neighborhood association in the Ashburton community for 12 years. He was the vice president of Mt. Washington Elementary School PTO for 5 years. He is also a deacon at Union Baptist Church, on Druid Hill Avenue, in Baltimore.

== Three open seats ==
During the four-year term prior to Tarrant's candidacy for the House of Delegates, two of the delegates, Howard "Pete" Rawlings and Tony Fulton, died while in office. Marshall Goodwin and Catherine Pugh were appointed to finish their terms. Rawlings and Fulton were Democrats, as are Goodwin and Pugh. Prior to the 2006 Democratic primary, the only incumbent delegate in the district, Salima Marriott, decided to run for the Senate seat, which was vacated by the district's senator. Catherine Pugh also decided to run for the same seat leaving the newly appointed Goodwin as the only incumbent in the race. The vacancies drew a large crowd of contenders; including Tarrant, Barbara Robinson and Frank M. Conaway, Jr., who all finished ahead of Goodwin. The General Election in November, therefore, featured all newcomers for the three open seats.

=== General election results, 2006 ===
- 2006 Race for Maryland House of Delegates – 40th District

Voters to choose three:

Name	Votes	Percent	Outcome
Frank M. Conaway, Jr. Dem.	16,432	32.4%	Won
Barbara A. Robinson, Dem.	16,032	31.6%	Won
Shawn Z. Tarrant, Dem.	13,921	27.5%	Won
Jan E. Danforth, Green	4,135	8.2%	Lost
Other Write-Ins	177	0.3%	

Tarrant was defeated in the 2014 Maryland Democratic primary after serving 8 years in the Maryland House.

=== Legislative notes ===
- Co-sponsored HB 860 (Baltimore City Public Schools Construction and Revitalization Act of 2013). Signed by the governor on May 16, 2013, the new law approved 1.1 billion dollars to construct new schools in Baltimore City.
- Voted for the Clean Indoor Air Act of 2007 (HB359)
- Voted in favor of prohibiting ground rents in 2007(SB106)
- Voted in favor of increasing the sales tax - Tax Reform Act of 2007(HB2)
- Voted in favor of in-state tuition for undocumented immigrants in 2007 (HB6)
