= Verda Welcome =

American politician (1907–1990)

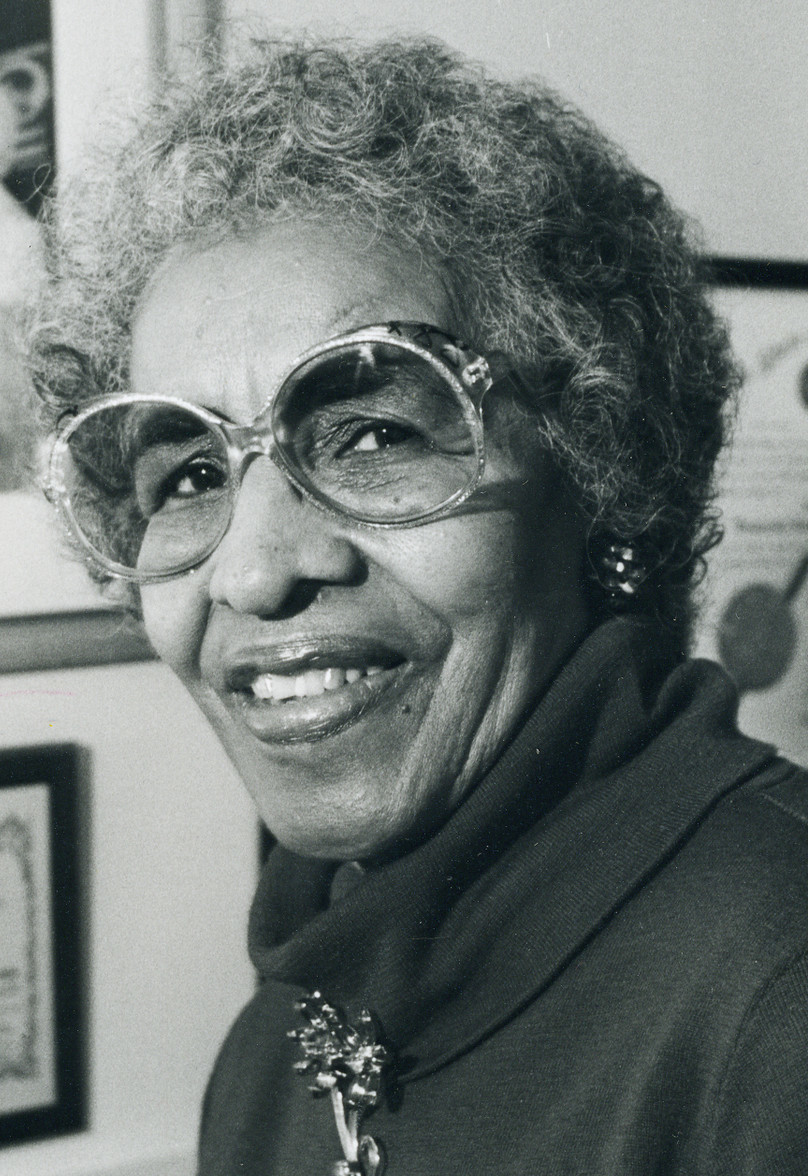

Member of the Maryland Senate
- In office January 2, 1963 – January 12, 1983
- Preceded by: J. Alvin Jones
- Succeeded by: Troy Brailey
- Constituency: Fourth District of Baltimore City (1962–1974); 40th district (1974–1982)

Member of the Maryland House of Delegates from the Fourth District of Baltimore City
- In office January 7, 1959 – January 2, 1963
- Preceded by: Emory Cole; Truly Hatchett; Morton C. Pollack
- Succeeded by: Joseph Abramson; Harvey A. Epstein; Clarence Mitchell III; Ernest D. Young

Personal details
- Born: Verda Mae Freeman; March 18, 1907 Lake Lure, North Carolina, U.S.
- Died: April 22, 1990 (aged 83) Baltimore, Maryland, U.S.
- Party: Democratic
- Spouse: Henry C. Welcome (m. 1935)
- Children: 1
- Education: Morgan State College (BA); New York University (MA)

Verda Mae Freeman Welcome (18 March 1907 – 22 April 1990) was an American teacher, civil rights leader, and Maryland state senator. Welcome was the second black woman to be elected to a state senate in the U.S. (Cora Mae Brown was the first in 1952). She spent 25 years in the Maryland legislature and worked to pass legislation which enforced stricter employment regulations and discouraged racial discrimination.

== Early life and education ==
She was one of fifteen children of farmers John and Docia Freeman. Following the death of her mother and faced with a limited amount of money for education, Welcome worked during the day and attended school in the evening. Because of the strain on her, she was encouraged to drop out of school, which she refused to do, and came to Baltimore in 1929 instead. Welcome continued her education in Baltimore and graduated from Coppin Normal School and Morgan State College. She later earned her Master of Arts degree from New York University and taught in the Baltimore City public Schools for eleven years. She was awarded honorary degrees from Howard University and the University of Maryland. She married Dr. Henry C. Welcome in 1935. She was a member of Delta Sigma Theta sorority.

== Politics ==
In 1958, Welcome was elected to the Maryland House of Delegates to represent the Fourth District of Baltimore City, becoming the first black woman to hold the position, which she held for three years. Elected to the Maryland State Senate in 1962, she was the second black woman in the United States to be elected to hold a state senate seat. In April 1964, Welcome survived an assassination attempt; two men were convicted. In 1967, Welcome worked towards eliminating Maryland's racial segregation laws which had been in place since slavery was legal.

Welcome was a delegate to the Democratic National Convention in 1968, 1972, and 1976. She served in political office until 1982, when she retired. Welcome died on 22 April 1990 in Baltimore.

== Other accomplishments ==
Welcome was awarded a Woman of the Year award in 1962, which was presented by the Women's Auxiliary to the National Medical Association. In 1988, she was inducted into the Maryland Women's Hall of Fame.

== Bibliography ==
- Maryland General Assembly, Verda Freeman Welcome: A Person of Principle, 1991.
- Welcome, Verda F., My Life and Times: Verda F. Welcome As Told to James M. Abraham. Englewood Cliffs, NJ : Henry House Publishers, Inc., 1991.
