= Lloyal Randolph =

American politician

Maryland House of Delegates 4th District
- In office 1968–1974
- Preceded by: Victorine Q. Adams
- Succeeded by: (district renumbered-redistricting)
- Constituency: 40th district, Baltimore City

Maryland House of Delegates 40th District
- In office 1974–1978
- Preceded by: (new district-redistricting)
- Succeeded by: Howard P. Rawlings

Personal details
- Born: April 6, 1904 Keyser, West Virginia, United States
- Died: October 1983 (aged 79) Baltimore, Maryland
- Party: Democratic

Lloyal Randolph (April 6, 1904 – October 1983) was an American politician who represented the 4th, then 40th legislative districts in the Maryland House of Delegates. Randolph was the second person to serve as chairman of the Legislative Black Caucus of Maryland.

== Background ==
Randolph was born in Keyser, West Virginia on April 6, 1904. He attended Baltimore City public schools. He was at one point in his career, the Chief Clerk of the Board of Supervisors of Elections in Baltimore and Chairman of the Executive Committee of the Metro Democratic Organization. Former member and Past Exalted Ruler, Monumental Elks Lodge No. 3., Former Grand Trustee of Improved Benevolent and Protective Order of Elks of the World National Grand Commissioner of Transportation of Elks Grand Lodge. Treasurer, Mondawmin Neighborhood Club.

== In the legislature ==
Randolph was appointed to the Maryland House of Delegates on January 5, 1968 after Delegate Victorine Q. Adams resigned her 4th legislative district seat. In 1974, the first election after redistricting, he won re-election, but to a new district, the 40th. Chairman, Democratic National Committee for Maryland Minorities Division for Franklin D. Roosevelt's fourth term, Harry S. Truman and Adlai E. Stevenson campaigns. Randolph also served as a delegate to the Democratic National Convention and as the statewide vice chairman for the J. Millard Tawes campaign for governor.
In 1981, after leaving the legislature, Randolph was appointed to the Maryland State Commission to Study the Regulatory Structure of the Banking, Savings and Loan and Small Loan Industries.
