= Elton Fax =

American artist (1909–1993)

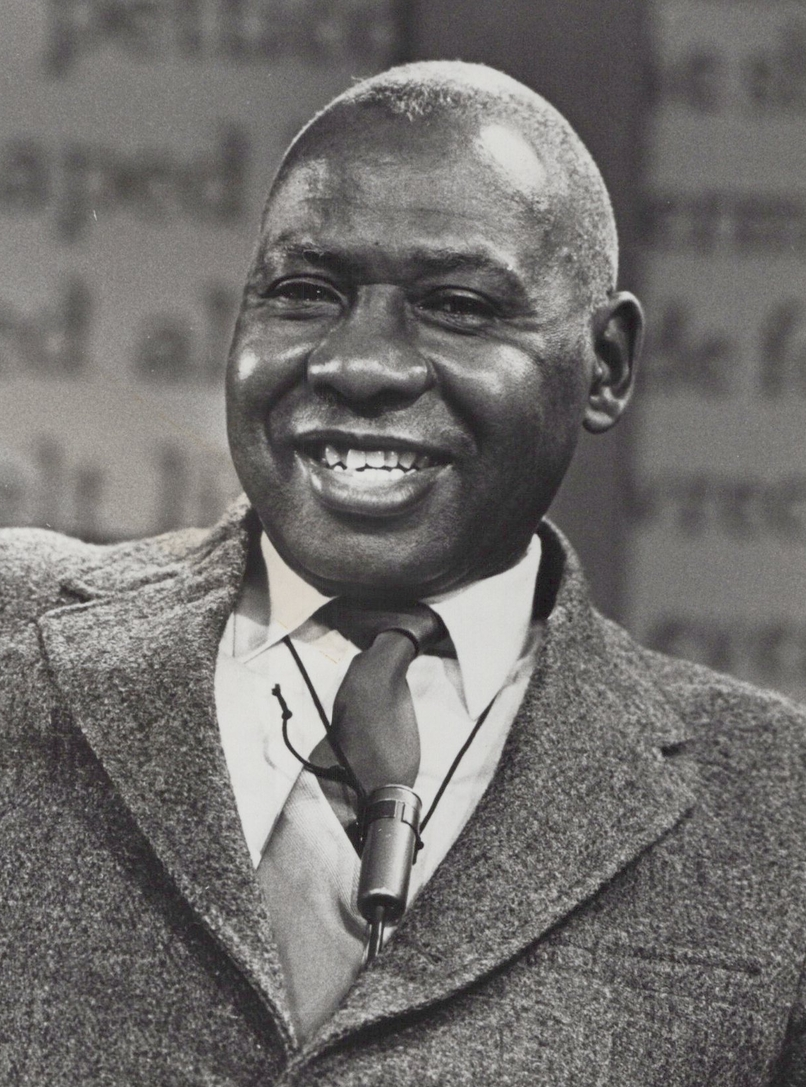
Fax in 1972

Elton Clay Fax (October 9, 1909 – May 13, 1993) was an American illustrator, cartoonist, and writer.

== Early life and education ==
Elton Clay Fax was born in 1909, in Baltimore, Maryland, the son of Mark Oakland Fax and Willie Estelle Fax. His father was a stevedore at the Baltimore Railroad Depot; his mother was a seamstress. Elton Fax graduated from Frederick Douglass High School in 1926, where he was classmates with Cab Calloway, who became a noted musician.

Fax first attended Claflin College, a historically black college in Orangeburg, South Carolina, but transferred north to Syracuse University in New York state. There he earned a Bachelor of Fine Arts degree in 1931. Soon after college he was featured in a solo art show at the offices of the Baltimore Afro-American newspaper.

== Career ==
Elton Fax taught art at the Harlem Community Art Center in New York beginning in 1934. He also worked with the Works Project Administration (WPA) Federal Art Project, a government financial assistance program for artists during the Great Depression. Fax was an illustrator for magazines such as Weird Tales, Astounding Science-Fiction, Complete Cowboy, Real Western, Story Parade, Child Life, and All Sports.

In 1942 he began a newspaper comic named Susabelle, and later an illustrated history panel, They'll Never Die; both were carried in African-American newspapers. He also created greeting card illustrations for The Links.

During the 1940s Fax worked for several comic companies as a cartoonist, including Continental Features Syndicate, a group that sold comic books throughout black communities. Some other companies he worked for as a cartoonist included Funnies Inc., Quality Comics, and Novelty Comics.

Books that Fax wrote and illustrated include West African Vignettes (1960), Contemporary Black Leaders (1970), Seventeen Black Artists (1972), Garvey (1972, a biography of Marcus Garvey), Through Black Eyes: Journeys of a Black Artist to East Africa and Russia (1974), Black Artists of the New Generation (1977), and Hashar (1980).

In addition, Fax illustrated books by such children's authors as Georgene Faulkner and Verna Aardema. He also created dust jacket art for various publishers, as well as a literacy pamphlet for the Pan American Union. Among the books he illustrated are Paul Cuffee: America's First Black Captain (1970) by Johanna Johnston, and Take a Walk in Their Shoes (1989) by Glennette Turner.

From 1949 to 1956, Fax was a "chalk talk artist" with the New York Times Children's Book Program. As he presented stories to children's groups, he also spontaneously illustrated them.

Fax was sponsored by the U.S. State Department for travel in Latin America in 1955, and a period as a lecturer in East Africa in 1963. After living in Mexico and traveling through Bolivia, Argentina, and Uruguay, Fax wrote in his article "It's Been a Beautiful but Rugged Journey" about feeling concerned after the United States Embassy asked him if he had seen any "communist activity".

While in East Africa, he also toured Nigeria with jazz musician Randy Weston on a trip sponsored by the American Society of African Culture (AMSAC). As one of fourteen AMSAC representatives at a meeting of the Congress of Black Writers and Artists in Rome in 1959, he reported on what happened at the meeting for the New York Age.

After his time in Rome, Fax toured Africa, visiting such countries as Nigeria, Sudan, Egypt, and Ethiopia. He drew from these trips for sketches published in his first book, West African Vignettes. Fax's drawings were also used in the United States Information Agency film series Adventure Africa. Fax returned to Europe for the Union of Soviet Writers meetings in 1971 and 1973 and the Bulgarian Writers' Conference in 1977.

Fax was a fellow at the MacDowell Colony in 1968. He received a Rockefeller Foundation Research Grant in 1976 to travel to Italy. Other awards included the Coretta Scott King Award from the American Library Association in 1972 and the Chancellor's Medal from Syracuse University in 1990.

== Personal life and legacy ==
In 1929, Elton Fax married Grace Elizabeth Turner. They had three children together. The family lived in Mexico for several years in the 1950s and traveled widely. His second wife was Elizabeth V. Murrell, a social worker.

Elton Fax died in 1993, age 83, in Queens, New York. He was the older brother of music scholar Mark Fax.

Sue Bailey Thurman donated some of Elton Fax's visual art to Heritage Hall at Livingstone College in 1973. His papers are housed at the New York Public Library, Boston University, and Syracuse University.

== Selected works ==
- Through Black Eyes: Journeys of a Black Artist to East Africa and Russia (1960)
- West African Vignettes (1960)
- Contemporary Black Leaders (1970)
- Seventeen Black Artists (1971)
- Garvey: The Story of a Pioneer Black Nationalist (1972)
- Black Artists of the New Generation (1977)
- Elyuchin (1984)
- Hashar (1980)
- Soviet People as I Knew Them (1988)

=== Illustrator only ===
- Dr. George Washington Carver, Scientist by Shirley Graham Du Bois and George Dewey Lipscomb (1944)
- Almena's Dogs by Regina Jones Woody (1954)
- Tales from the Story Hat by Verna Aardema (1960)
- The Na of Wa by Verna Aardema (1960)
- Opening sequence for Africa Adventure short film series (beginning 1966), produced by the US Information Agency
- Black and Beautiful by Ruby Dee (1974)
- Paul Cuffee: America's First Black Captain by Johanna Johnston (1970)
- The Seven Wishes of Joanna Peabody by Genevieve Gray (1972)
- Take a Walk in Their Shoes by Glennette Tilley Turner (1989)
