= William L. Adams =

William L. Adams may refer to:

- William L. Adams (pioneer) (1821–1906), American writer, newspaper editor, and doctor from Oregon
- William L. Adams (businessman) (1914–2011), Baltimore businessman and venture capitalist
