= Victorine Q. Adams =

American politician (1912–2006)

Victorine Quille Adams (née Quille; April 28, 1912 – January 8, 2006) was the first African-American woman to serve on the Baltimore City Council. Born in Baltimore, Maryland to Joseph C. and Estelle Tate Quille, she graduated from Frederick Douglass High School and attended Coppin Teachers College (now Coppin State University), as well as Morgan State College (now Morgan State University). After graduating from college, Adams worked as a teacher in Baltimore City for fourteen years.

In 1935, Adams met and married William L. "Little Willie" Adams, a local businessman who acquired his initial wealth through numbers games and eventually became a wealthy businessman and power broker. Adams turned her eye towards politics when she founded a women's political club, the Colored Democratic Women's Campaign Committee, in 1946. The initial purpose of the group was to "mobilize support for candidates -- invariably white -- who were sympathetic to black causes." Theodore McKeldin Jr., was one such politician. Eventually, they focused their efforts on the election of African-American politicians citywide and statewide, such as Verda Welcome and Harry A. Cole.

In 1962, Adams ran unsuccessfully for a seat in the Maryland State Senate; she was elected to the Maryland House of Delegates in 1966 as a member of the Democratic Party. The following year, Adams left the state legislature to run for a seat on Baltimore City Council, representing the 4th District. In 1979, while serving on the City Council, Adams partnered with the Baltimore Gas and Electric Company to establish the Baltimore Fuel Fund, which is designed to help local families with their heating bills. The fund has since been renamed the Victorine Q. Adams Fuel Fund. Adams served four terms until her retirement in 1983. She remained active with the Women's Campaign Committee until her death in 2006.
