= Roger Brown (defensive back) =

American football player (born 1966)

No. 46, 47
- Position: Defensive back

Personal information
- Born: December 16, 1966 (age 59); Baltimore, Maryland, U.S.
- Listed height: 6 ft 0 in (1.83 m)
- Listed weight: 196 lb (89 kg)

Career information
- High school: Cardinal Gibbons (Baltimore)
- College: Virginia Tech
- NFL draft: 1990: 8th round, 215th overall pick

Career history
- Green Bay Packers (1990)*; New York Giants (1990–1991); New England Patriots (1992)
- * Offseason or practice squad member only

Awards and highlights
- Super Bowl champion (XXV)

Career NFL statistics
- Fumble recoveries: 1
- Stats at Pro Football Reference

Roger W. Brown Jr. (born December 16, 1966) is an American former professional football player who was a defensive back in the National Football League (NFL). He graduated from the Cardinal Gibbons School in 1986, where he lettered in football. Brown played college football for the Virginia Tech Hokies, and was selected by the Green Bay Packers in the eighth round of the 1990 NFL draft. Brown played three seasons in the NFL, with the New York Giants in 1990 and 1991 and the New England Patriots in 1992. He won the Super Bowl with the 1990 Giants.

== Personal ==
Brown lives in Silver Spring, Maryland, is married and has three children. His father, Roger W. Brown, was a judge on the Circuit Court in Baltimore.
