= Roger W. Brown =

American judge

Honorable Roger W. Brown

Associate Judge, Baltimore City Circuit Court
- In office 1987–2002
- Appointed by: William Donald Schaefer

Judge, District Court of Maryland for Baltimore City
- In office 1985–1987
- Appointed by: Harry R. Hughes

Personal details
- Born: October 12, 1940 Baltimore, Maryland
- Died: March 23, 2009 (aged 68)
- Education: Morgan State University, University of Baltimore School of Law
- Relations: Roger Brown (defensive back)

Roger W. Brown (October 12, 1940 – March 23, 2009) was an American lawyer and Judge on the Circuit Court for Baltimore City and the District Court of Maryland for Baltimore City.

== Background ==
Brown was born in Baltimore, Maryland, October 12, 1940. Orphaned at 13, he moved in with an older married sister in Cherry Hill and attended Baltimore City public schools. Brown graduated from the Douglass High School in 1959. He graduated from Morgan State College, with a B.A. (political science) in 1965 and the University of Baltimore School of Law, with a J.D. in 1973. Brown was admitted to the Maryland Bar in 1974. His first major job was as a caseworker, with the Baltimore City Department of Juvenile Services from 1965 to 1970. He was promoted to personnel officer in 1970 and served as same until 1974. During law school, Brown clerked for the law firm Mitchell and Lee, P.A. Brown's first job as an attorney came in 1974 when he was hired as an Assistant State's Attorney for Baltimore City. In 1975 he left the prosecutor's office to start a law firm with Ronald Owens. He later joined Mitchell and Lee as an associate attorney in 1978. He left that firm to become an Assistant Public Defender in Baltimore City from 1979 to 1985.

== Judicial career ==
Brown was first appointed as an Associate Judge of the District Court of Maryland, District 1, Baltimore City by Harry R. Hughes in 1985 and remained there until 1987. He was a member of the Court's Commissioner Education Committee, 1985–87; Mental Health and Alcoholism Committee, 1986-87. He was appointed Associate Judge, Baltimore City Circuit Court, 8th Judicial Circuit on September 16, 1987 by William Donald Schaefer and served until his retirement on November 12, 2002. During that time he was a member of the Juvenile and Family Law Committee, the Conference of Circuit Judges, 1987, the Board of Directors, Judicial Institute of Maryland, 1988–89 and a Member of the Criminal Law and Procedure Committee, Maryland Judicial Conference, 1997-2000. Brown also served as the Circuit representative to the Conference of Circuit Judges from 1999 to 2002. Member, Circuit Court Libraries Study Committee, 2000-01.
