= Paula Campbell =

American R&B singer

- Born: Paula Campbell; July 22, 1981 (age 45)
- Origin: Baltimore, Maryland, United States
- Genres: R&B
- Occupations: Singer; songwriter
- Instrument: vocals
- Years active: 2004–present
- Labels: Sony; Columbia; Camp Rebelwood Ent.
- Website: www.iampaulacampbell.com

Paula Campbell is an American R&B singer from Baltimore, Maryland who first gained prominence as a contestant in the 2003 Baltimore Idol where she reached the top 8. Following the competition, she collaborated with DJ Rod Lee on the track "How Does it Feel," featuring local rapper Tim Trees, which became a regional hit. This success led to her debut album, "Who Got Next?," released in 2004 on the independent label Blakbyrd Music, reaching #92 on the Billboard R&B charts. Campbell's opened for Kanye West in Baltimore and contributed to a remix of Fat Joe's "Lean Back." In 2009, she released a Mixtape/Street album titled 'Dreammaker' and won a Glamour magazine music contest.

== Biography ==
Campbell was raised on the west side of Baltimore, and attended Frederick Douglass High School. Her first major exposure was in the 2003 Baltimore Idol, where she placed in the top 8. After the competition, DJ Rod Lee of Baltimore radio station 92Q contacted Campbell, and together the two cut a track, "How Does it Feel", which featured local rapper Tim Trees and became a regional hit. How Does It Feel was number one in Baltimore, DC and Virginia for 8 weeks straight . In 2004, she released her first album, Who Got Next? on independent label Blakbyrd Music, which hit #92 on the Billboard R&B charts.

She opened for Kanye West at a Baltimore show and sang on a remix of Fat Joe's "Lean Back" which received some national attention. She began writing a second album in 2005 but placed the project on hold after signing to Sony BMG in May of that year, who had planned to release her second effort, I Am Paula Campbell, late in 2006. The release of the album was delayed, however, and it has yet to be released. In 2009, she released her Mixtape/Street album, 'Dreammaker'.

Campbell won a Glamour magazine music contest and shot a music video for the song "Ain't Nobody Stupid", directed by Ciara. "Ain't Nobody Stupid" was written by Ne-Yo, with whom Campbell toured in the summer of 2007. In 2009, Campbell began her I Am Paula Campbell Mini tour in the Dmv area.

== Discography ==
Information
Who Got Next? (Blakbyrd Music Group)
- Released: April 27, 2004
- Chart positions: US R&B #92
- RIAA certification:N/A
- U.S. sales: 300,000 independently
Dreammaker
- Released: 2009
- Chart positions:
- RIAA certification:
- U.S. sales:

=== Singles ===
Year	Title	Chart positions	Album
Year	Title	U.S. R&B	Album
2004	"How Does It Feel?"(featuring Tim Trees)	–	Who Got Next?
2004	"Take You Home"	120	Who Got Next?
2008	"I Can't Leave"	–	I Am Paula Campbell
