= Marlon Amprey =

American politician (born 1987)

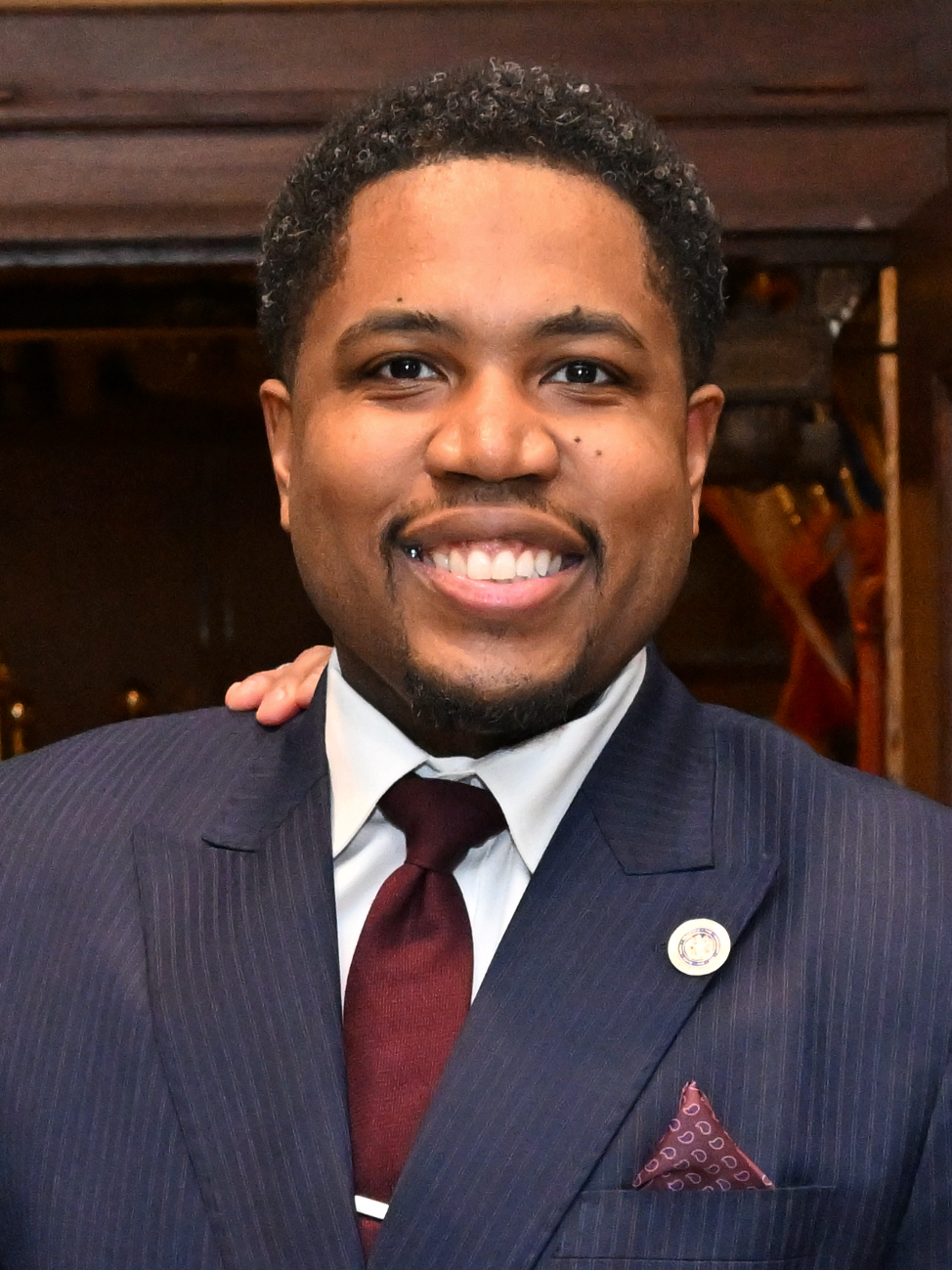
- Amprey in 2023

Member of the Maryland House of Delegates from the 40th district
- Incumbent
- Assumed office January 13, 2021 Serving with Frank M. Conaway Jr. and Melissa Wells
- Appointed by: Larry Hogan
- Preceded by: Nick Mosby

Personal details
- Born: January 24, 1987 (age 39) Baltimore, Maryland, U.S.
- Party: Democratic
- Children: 1
- Education: University of Maryland, College Park (BA); George Mason University; (MEd); University of Pennsylvania (JD)

Marlon D. Amprey (born January 24, 1987) is an American politician who has served as a member of the Maryland House of Delegates representing District 40 since 2021.

== Early life and education ==
Amprey was born on January 24, 1987, in Baltimore. His grandparents came to Baltimore during the Great Migration. His uncle, Walter Amprey, served as the superintendent of Baltimore City Public Schools from 1991 to 1997.

Amprey graduated from University of Maryland, College Park in 2009 with a Bachelor of Arts in American government and politics; George Mason University, where he earned a Master of Education in elementary education and curriculum; and University of Pennsylvania Law School with a Juris Doctor degree in 2016. In the same year, Amprey earned a certificate in business management from the Wharton School.

== Career ==
Amprey was a teacher for Howard Road Academy Public Charter School, a school in Washington, D.C., and was a member of Teach For America from 2009 to 2011. From 2011 to 2013, he was a sixth grade teacher at The SEED School of Maryland. While attending law school, Amprey interned for U.S. Representative Elijah Cummings. He has served as the director of Patterson Park Public Charter School and Code in the Schools since 2016.

Amprey then worked as a corporate associate at Venable LLP from 2016 to 2019, and subsequently worked as an associate of DLA Piper until 2020. He worked as an associate at Cole Scholtz P.C. from 2020 to 2021, at McKennon Shelton & Henn from 2021 to 2022, and at Rosenberg Martin Greenberg LLP since 2022.

Amprey served on the transition team of Baltimore mayor-elect Brandon Scott.

== In the legislature ==
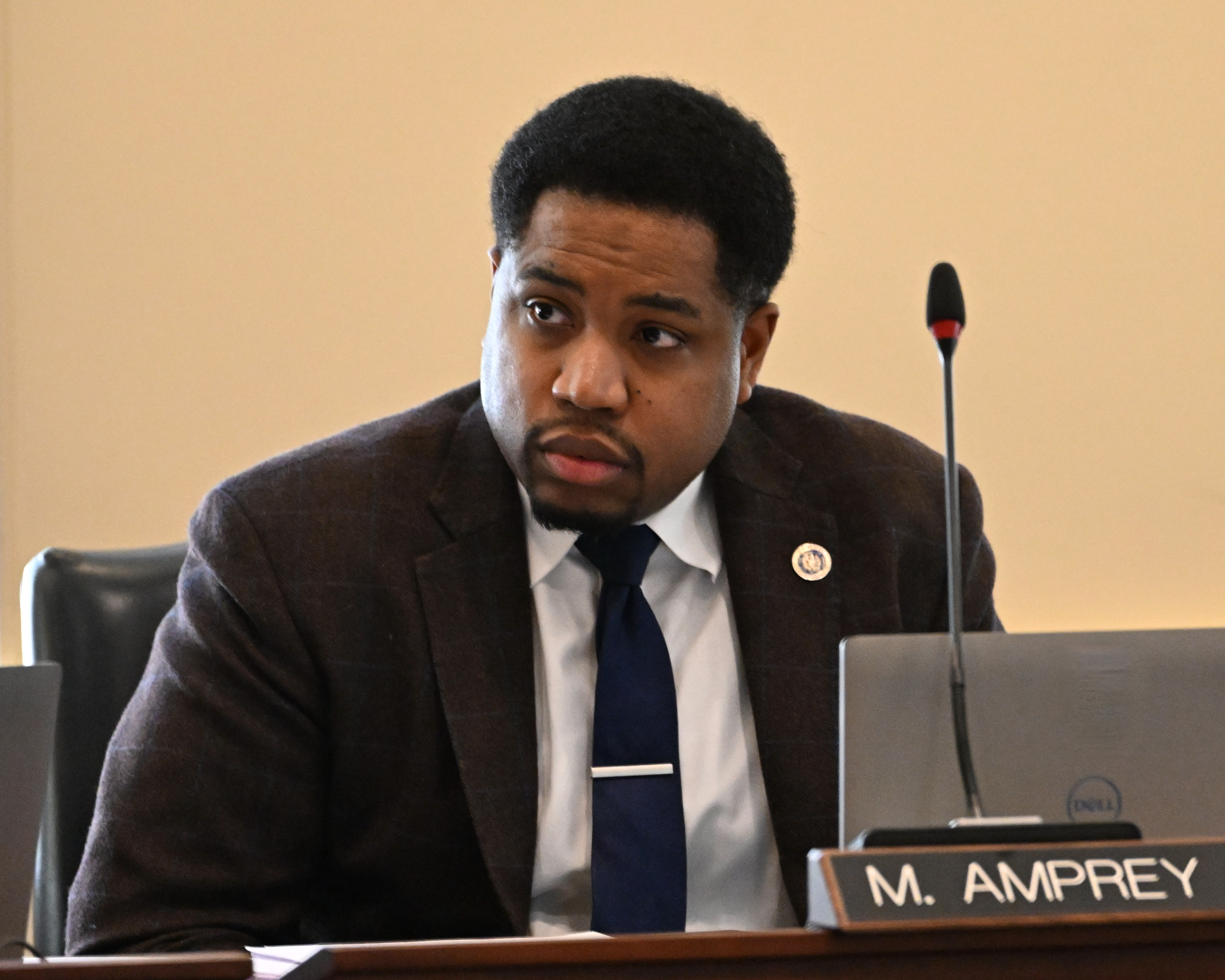
Amprey in the Economic Matters Committee, 2024

In December 2020, after state Delegate Nick Mosby resigned following his election as president of the Baltimore City Council, Amprey applied to serve the remainder of Mosby's term in the Maryland House of Delegates. His candidacy was backed by state Senator Antonio Hayes and Baltimore mayor-elect Brandon Scott. The Baltimore City Democratic Central Committee voted 4-3 to nominate Amprey to the seat on December 30, and Governor Larry Hogan appointed him to the seat on January 6, 2021. He was sworn in on January 13, 2021. Amprey was elected to a full four-year term in 2022.

Amprey served as a member of the Environment and Transportation Committee from 2021 to 2022, and has served in the Economic Matters Committee and as a deputy majority whip since 2023.

== Political positions ==
=== Education ===
Amprey supports the Blueprint for Maryland's Future.

=== Energy ===
During the 2023 legislative session, Amprey introduced a bill to review expanding the staffing and operations of the Maryland Public Service Commission.

=== Housing and development ===
During the 2021 legislative session, Amprey introduced legislation to establish the West North Avenue Development Authority to oversee and support community revitalization efforts. The bill passed and became law. He also supported a bill to provide relief to assist homeowners with making mortgage payments amid the COVID-19 pandemic.

In 2022, Amprey introduced a bill to impose a 90-day pause on home purchases made by large investors in Maryland. The bill died in committee.

During the 2023 legislative session, Amprey introduced legislation to prohibit exclusive listing agreements from lasting more than a year, which passed and became law.

=== Policing ===
During the 2023 legislative session, Amprey introduced legislation that would require private security guards to be licensed by the state, and establish minimum training standards for security agencies. The bill passed and was signed into law by Governor Wes Moore.

== Personal life ==
Amprey is married to his wife, Normandi, whom he met while teaching. Together, they have a daughter.

== Electoral history ==
Maryland House of Delegates District 40 Democratic primary election, 2022
Party	Candidate	Votes	%
Democratic	Melissa Wells (incumbent)	8,059	21.6
Democratic	Marlon Amprey (incumbent)	7,150	19.2
Democratic	Frank M. Conaway Jr. (incumbent)	6,928	18.6
Democratic	Kathy Shulman	4,819	12.9
Democratic	China Boak Terrell	4,299	11.5
Democratic	Crystal Jackson Parker	4,120	11.0
Democratic	Cameron E. Green Sr.	1,212	3.3
Democratic	Juan Snell	744	2.0

Maryland House of Delegates District 40 election, 2022
Party	Candidate	Votes	%
Democratic	Melissa Wells (incumbent)	20,872	32.7
Democratic	Frank M. Conaway, Jr. (incumbent)	20,052	31.4
Democratic	Marlon Amprey (incumbent)	19,778	31.0
Republican	Zulieka A. Baysmore	2,852	4.5
Write-in		328	0.5
