= Maryland Legislative District 40 =

American legislative district

Maryland's legislative district 40
- Represents part of the City of Baltimore
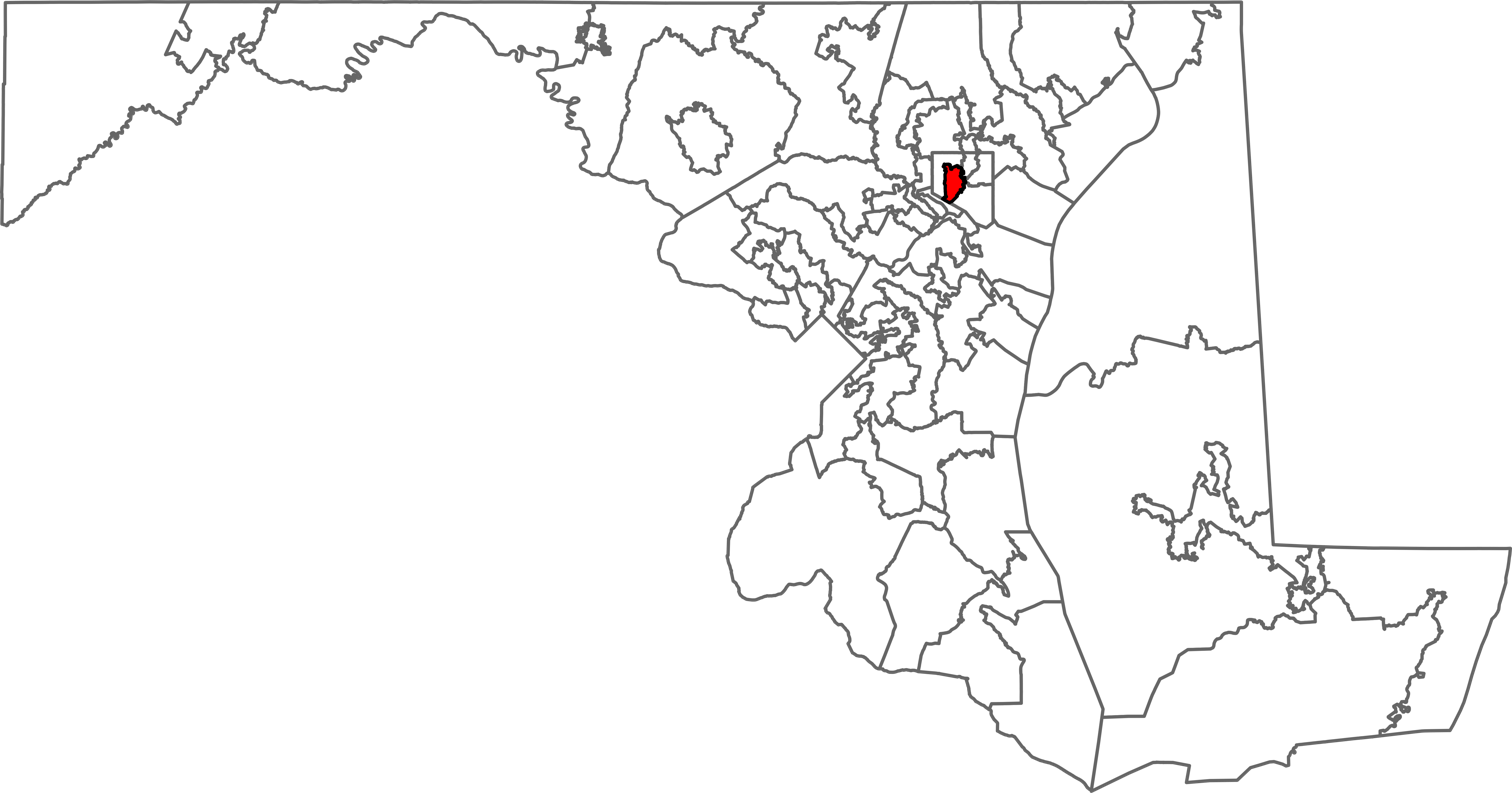
- Senator: Antonio Hayes (D)
- Delegate(s): Marlon D. Amprey (D); Frank M. Conaway Jr. (D); Melissa Wells (D)
- Registration: 79.4% Democratic; 6.1% Republican; 13.0% unaffiliated
- Demographics: 23.9% White; 64.2% Black/African American; 0.3% Native American; 4.2% Asian; 0.0% Hawaiian/Pacific Islander; 2.3% Other race; 5.2% Two or more races; 4.6% Hispanic
- Population (2020): 102,052
- Voting-age population: 83,408
- Registered voters: 71,059

Maryland Legislative District 40 is one of 47 legislative districts in the state of Maryland and one of the 5 located entirely within Baltimore City. The 40th district is located in the central western portions of Baltimore City and contains the Druid Park Lake, Druid Hill Park and The Maryland Zoo. The district is represented by three delegates in the Maryland House of Delegates.

== Demographic characteristics ==
As of the 2020 United States census, the district had a population of 102,052, of whom 83,408 (81.7%) were of voting age. The racial makeup of the district was 24,344 (23.9%) White, 65,470 (64.2%) African American, 309 (0.3%) Native American, 4,258 (4.2%) Asian, 20 (0.0%) Pacific Islander, 2,363 (2.3%) from some other race, and 5,263 (5.2%) from two or more races. Hispanic or Latino of any race were 4,688 (4.6%) of the population.

The district had 71,059 registered voters as of October 17, 2020, of whom 9,266 (13.0%) were registered as unaffiliated, 4,357 (6.1%) were registered as Republicans, 56,387 (79.4%) were registered as Democrats, and 617 (0.9%) were registered to other parties.

== Educational institutions ==
Coppin State University, Baltimore City Community College, University of Maryland School of Law, and the University of Maryland, Baltimore are all located in the 40th district.

=== High schools ===
The 40th district is also home to two of Baltimore's oldest African-American high schools: Douglass High School (1883) and Carver Vocational Technical High School (1925).

== Political representation ==
The district is represented for the 2023–2027 legislative term in the State Senate by Antonio L. Hayes (D) and in the House of Delegates by Marlon D. Amprey (D), Frank M. Conaway Jr. (D) and Melissa R. Wells (D).

== Election history ==
During the four years prior to the 2006 elections, two of the delegates, Howard "Pete" Rawlings and Tony Fulton, died while in office. Marshall Goodwin and Catherine E. Pugh were appointed to finish their terms. Rawlings and Fulton were Democrats, as were Goodwin and Pugh. Prior to the 2006 Democratic primary, the only incumbent delegate in the district, Salima Marriott, decided to run for the Senate seat being vacated by the district's senator. Catherine Pugh also decided to run for the same seat, leaving the newly appointed Goodwin as the only incumbent in the race. The vacancies drew a large crowd of contenders; including Conaway, Barbara Robinson, and Shawn Tarrant, who all finished ahead of Goodwin. The general election in November, therefore, featured all newcomers for the three open seats.

=== General election results, 2006 ===
2006 Race for Maryland House of Delegates – 40th District Voters to choose three:
Name	Votes	Percent	Outcome
Frank M. Conaway, Jr. Dem.	16,432	32.4%	Won
Barbara A. Robinson, Dem.	16,032	31.6%	Won
Shawn Z. Tarrant, Dem.	13,921	27.5%	Won
Jan E. Danforth, Green	4,135	8.2%	Lost
Other Write-Ins	177	0.3%	
