= Baltimore City Senate Delegation =

Delegation in the Maryland General Assembly

The Baltimore City Senate Delegation is an association of the six state senators who represent Baltimore in the Maryland General Assembly.

== Authority and responsibilities ==
The Baltimore City Senate Delegation is responsible for representing the interests, needs and concerns of the City of Baltimore in the Maryland General Assembly. The first priority has been to ensure that sufficient state funds are granted to the city to support the funding of education and the construction and operation of public school facilities. Additionally, the delegation monitors state transportation trust funds allocated to the city for its transportation infrastructure. Every year, the Mayor of Baltimore provides of list of special projects that need to be funded through state loans (bonds); the Baltimore City Senate Delegation is responsible for passage of those projects in the General Assembly.

== Current members ==
District	Senator	Party
40	Antonio Hayes	Democratic
41	Dalya Attar	Democratic
43	Mary L. Washington	Democratic
45	Cory V. McCray	Democratic
46	Bill Ferguson	Democratic
