= Harold Pratt =

Harold Pratt may refer to:

- Bob Pratt (1912–2001), born Harold Pratt, Australian rules footballer
- Harold I. Pratt (1877–1939), American oil industrialist and philanthropist
- Harold Douglas Pratt Jr. (born 1944), American ornithologist

== See also ==
- Harold Pratt House, New York City
- Harry Pratt (disambiguation)
