= Henry Pratt =

Henry Pratt may refer to:

- Henry Cheever Pratt (1803–1880), American artist and explorer
- Henry Lark Pratt (1805–1873), English artist
- Henry Conger Pratt (1882–1966), U.S. Army major general
- Henry Otis Pratt (1838–1931), American lawyer, minister, and Iowa Republican U.S. Representative
- Henry S. Pratt, American college football and basketball coach
- Henry C. Pratt (merchant) (1761–1838), American merchant
- Henry Pratt (1863–1943), Canadian settler
- Henry Pratt, the main character in a series of novels by David Nobbs

== See also ==
- Harry Pratt (disambiguation)
