= Emory Cole =

American politician (1893–1968)

Emory Ryan Cole

Member of the Maryland House of Delegates
- In office 1955–1959

Personal details
- Born: September 3, 1893 Cockeysville, Maryland, U.S.
- Died: August 16, 1968 (aged 74) Baltimore, Maryland, U.S.
- Party: Republican
- Education: Howard University

Emory Ryan Cole (September 3, 1893 – August 16, 1968) was a lawyer and state legislator in Maryland. He served in the Maryland House of Delegates.

He served in the U.S. military. He graduated from Howard University. He was a Republican. He lost his 1958 re-election campaign to Verda F. Welcome.

He has sometimes been noted as Emery Ryan Cole. He and Truly Hatchett were the first African Americans to serve in the body.

He was a veteran of World War II. He lost re-election to Verda Welcome who succeeded him in office.

== Personal life ==
He was a Freemason and an Elk. Cole was a member of the Veterans of Foreign Wars and the American Legion.

== See also ==
- List of African-American officeholders (1900–1959)
