= Marshall Goodwin =

American politician (born 1957)

Member of the Maryland House of Delegates from the 40th district
- In office December 19, 2003 – January 10, 2007
- Preceded by: Pete Rawlings
- Succeeded by: Frank M. Conaway Jr.

Personal details
- Born: March 16, 1957 (age 69) Baltimore, Maryland, U.S.
- Party: Democratic

Marshall T. "Toby" Goodwin (born March 16, 1957) is a politician from Baltimore, Maryland who represented the 40th district in the Maryland House of Delegates.

Born in Baltimore, Goodwin served in the Maryland Army National Guard from 1979 to 2005. He attended Sojourner–Douglass College, graduating with a BA in 1989, and received his master's in 1991 from Coppin State University, studying criminal justice administration. During this span, Goodwin also worked in the Baltimore City Sherriff's Office and in other law enforcement roles.

In 2003, Goodwin was appointed to the Maryland House of Delegates to fill the seat of Pete Rawlings, who died in office. He served there as a Democrat for just over three years; in the 2006 election, Goodwin ran for re-election but was defeated in the Democratic primary election, securing 10.3% of the vote and finishing in fifth place (the top three candidates advanced to the general).

After his time in the state legislature, Goodwin served as the police chief of the Baltimore City School Police Force from 2007 to 2016. He resigned after video emerged of two officers slapping and kicking a student, which resulted in charges against the officers.
