= Melissa Wells (politician) =

American politician (born 1983)

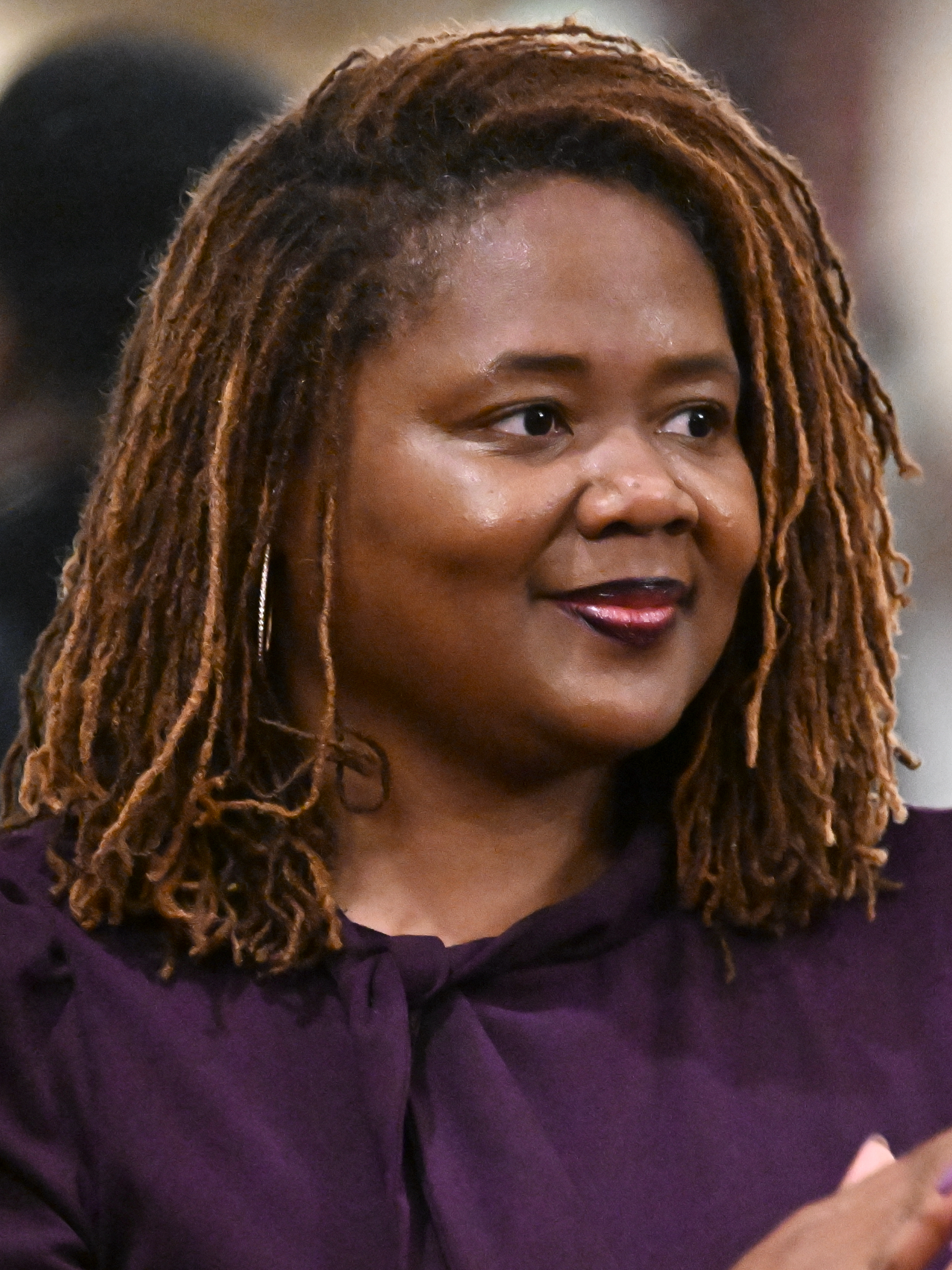
- Wells in 2024

Member of the Maryland House of Delegates from the 40th district
- Incumbent
- Assumed office January 9, 2019 Serving with Marlon Amprey, Frank M. Conaway Jr.
- Preceded by: Antonio Hayes
- Constituency: Baltimore City

Personal details
- Born: October 3, 1983 (age 42)
- Party: Democratic

Melissa R. Wells (born October 3, 1983) is an American politician who has served as a member of the Maryland House of Delegates representing District 40 since 2019.

== Early life and career ==
Wells was born on October 3, 1983. She attended University of California at Riverside in 2006, where she earned a B.A. degree in political science and law and sociology. She later attended American University in 2010, where she earned a M.A. degree in public policy. After graduating, she worked as a policy assistant for the Joint Center for Political and Economic Studies until 2014 and as a field advisor at Triple Point Interactions and program associate at PolicyLink until 2015. She is currently the regional director of the Baltimore-DC Building Trades Union.

== In the legislature ==
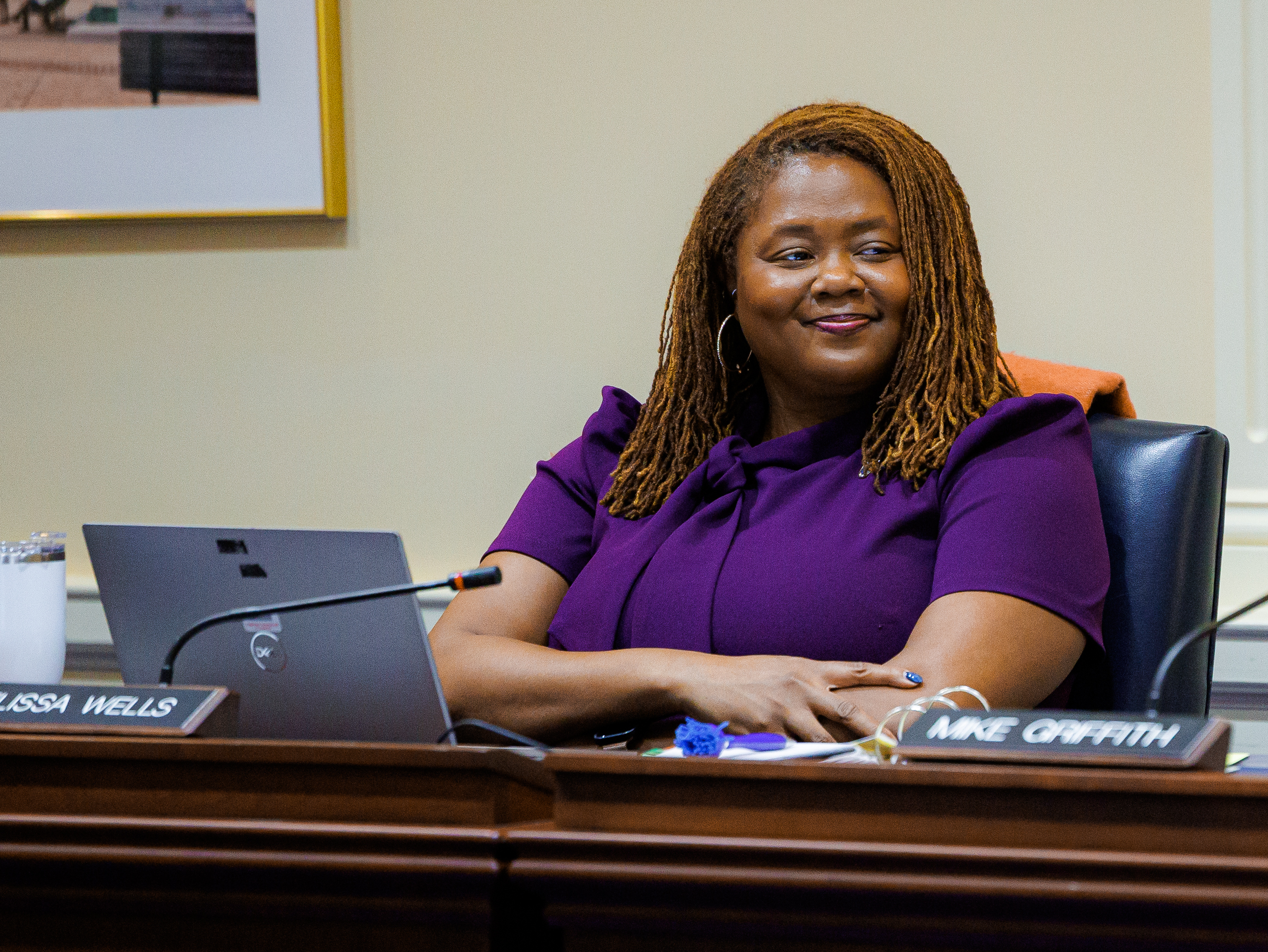
Wells in the Ways and Means Committee, 2025

Wells was sworn into the Maryland House of Delegates on January 9, 2019. She served as a member of the Environment and Transportation Committee from 2019 to 2022, afterwards serving in the Ways and Means Committee until 2025. In December 2025, House Speaker Joseline Peña-Melnyk named Wells as the chair of the newly-created Labor, Elections, and Government Committee.

In November 2019, Wells unsuccessfully ran for assistant majority leader of the House of Delegates, losing to state delegate Wanika B. Fisher in a 25-13 vote among the class of freshman Democratic legislators. Since 2020, she has served as Deputy Majority Whip. Since 2023, she has served as chief deputy majority whip.

== Political positions ==
=== Criminal justice and policing ===
In March 2019, Wells voted against a bill that would allow Johns Hopkins University to have its own private police force.

During the 2021 legislative session, Wells introduced bills that would require prosecutors to undergo implicit bias training, and another that would create a referendum in Baltimore on transferring control of the Baltimore Police Department back to the city.

During the 2026 legislative session, Wells introduced a bill that would require explicit zoning approval before a private immigration detention facility could operate in Maryland.

=== Electoral reform ===
In February 2026, Wells supported a congressional redistricting map proposed by the Governor's Redistricting Advisory Commission that would redraw Maryland's 1st congressional district to improve the Democratic Party's chances of winning it, saying that the measure was a response to the second Trump administration, which she claimed was deprioritizing Maryland's workforce. That same month, she supported a bill that would replace the party central committee appointment process used to fill vacancies in the Maryland General Assembly with special elections held at the same time as regular state primary elections.

=== Environment ===
In March 2022, Wells said that she would "reluctantly" vote for the Climate Solutions Now Act, an omnibus bill to reduce greenhouse gas emissions by 60 percent by 2030, saying that she felt that the bill "did not do enough to ensure strong labor standards".

=== Gun policy ===
During the 2019 legislative session, Wells voted against a bill that would allow school resource officers to carry guns in Baltimore schools.

=== Housing ===
During the 2021 legislative session, Wells introduced legislation to codify and extend the state's COVID-19 pandemic eviction moratorium until April 2022, and another that would extend judges' ability to delay eviction proceedings. In 2022, she introduced a bill that would allow judges to grant a recess in eviction proceedings to allow parties to seek legal representation.

=== Social issues ===
During the 2022 legislative session, Wells introduced legislation to prohibit auto insurers from using a policy holder's credit score to set rates. The bill was heavily amended following auto insurance industry lobbying before passing the Maryland House of Delegates and did not receive a vote in the Maryland Senate.

=== Transportation ===
During the 2019 legislative session, Wells introduced a bill that would cap Maryland Transit Administration fares at a monthly rate.

== Electoral history ==
Maryland House of Delegates District 40 Democratic primary election, 2018
| Party | Candidate | Votes | % |
|---|---|---|---|
| Democratic | Nick Mosby (incumbent) | 6,306 | 20.6 |
| Democratic | Melissa Wells | 4,423 | 14.4 |
| Democratic | Frank M. Conaway Jr. (incumbent) | 4,230 | 13.8 |
| Democratic | Westley West | 3,099 | 10.1 |
| Democratic | Gabriel Auteri | 2,905 | 9.5 |
| Democratic | Terrell Boston-Smith | 2,867 | 9.4 |
| Democratic | Sanjay Thomas | 1,646 | 5.4 |
| Democratic | Sarah Matthews | 1,361 | 4.4 |
| Democratic | Latia Hopkins | 1,231 | 4.0 |
| Democratic | Anees Abdul-Rahim | 1,075 | 3.5 |
| Democratic | Brian Murphy | 898 | 2.9 |
| Democratic | Timothy Mercer | 370 | 1.2 |
| Democratic | Blair DuCray | 240 | 0.8 |

Maryland House of Delegates District 40 election, 2018
| Party | Candidate | Votes | % |
|---|---|---|---|
| Democratic | Nick Mosby (incumbent) | 19,726 | 30.5 |
| Democratic | Melissa Wells | 18,952 | 29.3 |
| Democratic | Frank M. Conaway, Jr. (incumbent) | 16,767 | 25.9 |
| Green | Joshua Harris | 8,833 | 13.6 |
| Write-in | | 485 | 0.7 |

Maryland House of Delegates District 40 election, 2022
| Party | Candidate | Votes | % |
|---|---|---|---|
| Democratic | Melissa Wells (incumbent) | 20,872 | 32.7 |
| Democratic | Frank M. Conaway, Jr. (incumbent) | 20,052 | 31.4 |
| Democratic | Marlon Amprey (incumbent) | 19,778 | 31.0 |
| Republican | Zulieka A. Baysmore | 2,852 | 4.5 |
| Write-in | | 328 | 0.5 |
