= Barbara A. Robinson =

American politician (born 1938)

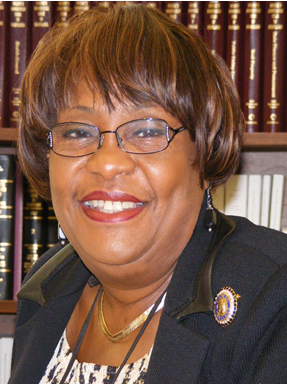

Member of the Maryland Senate from the 40th District
- In office December 21, 2016 – January 9, 2019
- Appointed by: Larry Hogan
- Preceded by: Catherine Pugh
- Succeeded by: Antonio Hayes

Member of the Maryland House of Delegates from the 40th District
- In office January 10, 2003 – December 21, 2016
- Preceded by: Salima Marriott
- Succeeded by: Nick Mosby

Personal details
- Born: June 8, 1938 (age 88) Alexandria City, Alabama
- Party: Democratic
- Spouse: Jerome Robinson Sr
- Children: 5 children
- Occupation: small business owner

Barbara A. Robinson (born June 8, 1938) is an American politician who represents the 40th legislative district in the Maryland Senate. Robinson is a former chair of the Legislative Black Caucus of Maryland.

== Background ==
Robinson attended the University of Baltimore where she earned her B.S. in business management in 1975 and Coppin State College with a M.A. in criminal justice in 1976.

== Three open seats ==
During the four-year term prior to Robinson's candidacy for the House of Delegates, two of the delegates, Howard "Pete" Rawlings and Tony Fulton, died while in office. Marshall Goodwin and Catherine Pugh were appointed to finish their terms. Rawlings and Fulton were democrats, as are Goodwin and Pugh. Prior to the 2006 democratic primary, the only incumbent delegate in the district, Salima Marriott, decided to run for the Senate seat being vacated by the district's senator. Catherine Pugh also decided to run for the same seat leaving the newly appointed Goodwin as the only incumbent in the race. The vacancies drew a large crowd of contenders; including Robinson, Frank Conaway, Jr. and Shawn Tarrant, who all finished ahead of Goodwin. The General Election in November, therefore, featured all newcomers for the three open seats.

=== General election results, 2006 ===
- 2006 Race for Maryland House of Delegates – 40th District

Voters to choose three:

Name	Votes	Percent	Outcome
Frank M. Conaway, Jr. Dem.	16,432	32.4%	Won
Barbara A. Robinson, Dem.	16,032	31.6%	Won
Shawn Z. Tarrant, Dem.	13,921	27.5%	Won
Jan E. Danforth, Green	4,135	8.2%	Lost
Other Write-Ins	177	0.3%	

=== Legislative notes ===
- Co-sponsored HB 860 (Baltimore City Public Schools Construction and Revitalization Act of 2013). Signed by the Governor on May 16, 2013, the new law approved 1.1 billion dollars to construct new schools in Baltimore City.
- voted for the Clean Indoor Air Act of 2007 (HB359)
- voted in favor of prohibiting ground rents(SB106)
- voted in favor of increasing the sales tax by 20% - Tax Reform Act of 2007(HB2)
- voted in favor of in-state tuition for illegal immigrants in 2007 (HB6)
- sponsored House Bill 30 in 2007, allowing the state to confiscate unused portions of gift certificates after 4 years.House Bill 30
