= Harry Truman Pratt Sr. =

American educator (1873–1945)

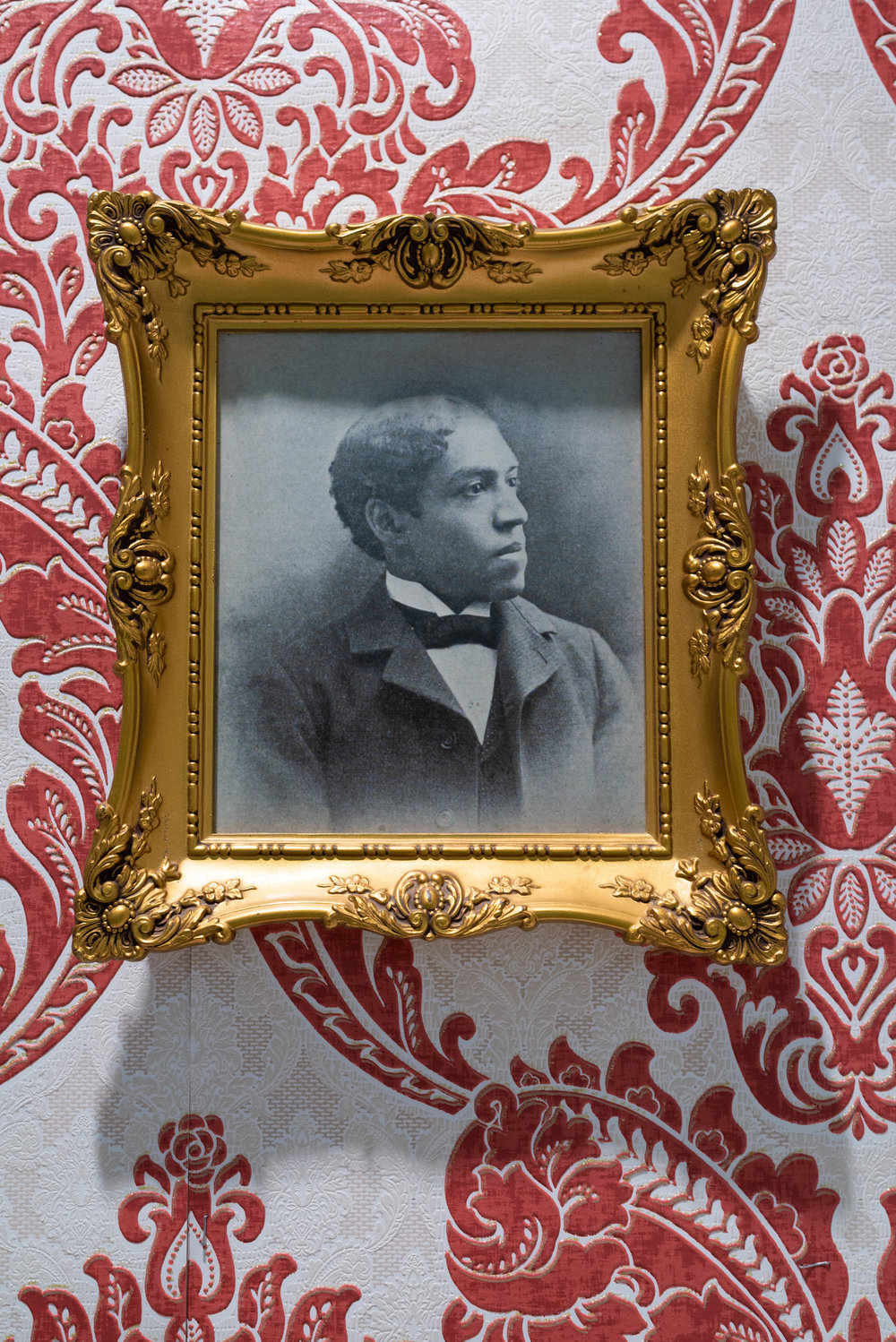
- Portrait in the 2019 exhibition "Blackives: A Celebration of Black History at MICA"
- Born: October 17, 1873; Baltimore, Maryland, U.S.
- Died: September 8, 1954 (aged 80); Baltimore, Maryland, U.S.
- Education: Colored High School (1894), Maryland Institute College of Art (1895), Morgan State University (1922), Columbia University, and University of Pennsylvania
- Alma mater: Colored High School, Maryland Institute College of Art, Morgan State University, Columbia University, and University of Pennsylvania
- Occupation: Educator
- Years active: 1898-1945
- Employer: Baltimore City Public Schools
- Spouse(s): Ellen Frances Lansey (1902-1921), Mary Lavellette Whitten (1922-1945)
- Children: Harry T. Pratt Jr., Claire Yvonne Pratt

Harry Truman Pratt Sr. (October 17, 1873 – September 8, 1945) was an American educator, artist, publisher, businessman, and civic leader. He was the first African American graduate of the Maryland Institute of Art and Design, currently the Maryland Institute College of Art, in 1895.

Pratt served in the field of education for 47 years. He became the first alumni to lead his alma mater Douglass High School, formerly the Colored High School, for eleven years and is credited with introducing the Alpha and Beta intelligence tests in Baltimore's colored schools. Pratt was a member of the Omega Psi Phi fraternity, the Negro Business Men’s League of Baltimore, and a number of local national teacher and principal associations. He was an acquaintance of Booker T. Washington and W. Ashbie Hawkins.

== Early life ==
Pratt was born to Louis and Clara Pratt in Baltimore, Maryland. He received his primary and grammar school education in the city’s public schools. Pratt attended the Colored High School where he demonstrated a talent in drawing and music. He was the valedictorian and commencement orator when he graduated in 1894.

On September 3, 1891, Harry T. Pratt was appointed to a scholarship to the Maryland Institute of Art and Design, by councilman Harry S. Cummings. The appointment was made under the $6,000 contract between the city and the Institute. The contract gave each member of the City Council the privilege to appoint one student each year to a three year scholarship to the college. The appointment was a surprise to the Board of the Director because it was the first time “a colored pupil” had been appointed. The Baltimore Sun reported that if the Institute did not accept Pratt they would forfeit their contract. At 15 years old, Pratt entered the college’s evening school architectural department under the premise he would have the same privilege as other students. Pratt graduated from the Institute with honors in 1895 in Freehand drawing.

== Career ==
After graduating from high school and the institute, Pratt worked for the Postal Service for three years before resigning to work for the city school system in 1898. He established Druid Laundry in Baltimore's Druid Hill neighborhood in 1899 with his father and brother, Walter. After his father’s death, the business operated in partnership with Wallis T. Lansey. Lansey would eventually operate the business independently. Pratt also established the Baltimore Times–a short lived weekly newspaper. In 1913, he leased the Times to a publisher in New Jersey.

He also attended Morgan State College in 1922. He headed the Summer School courses from 1924–1927.

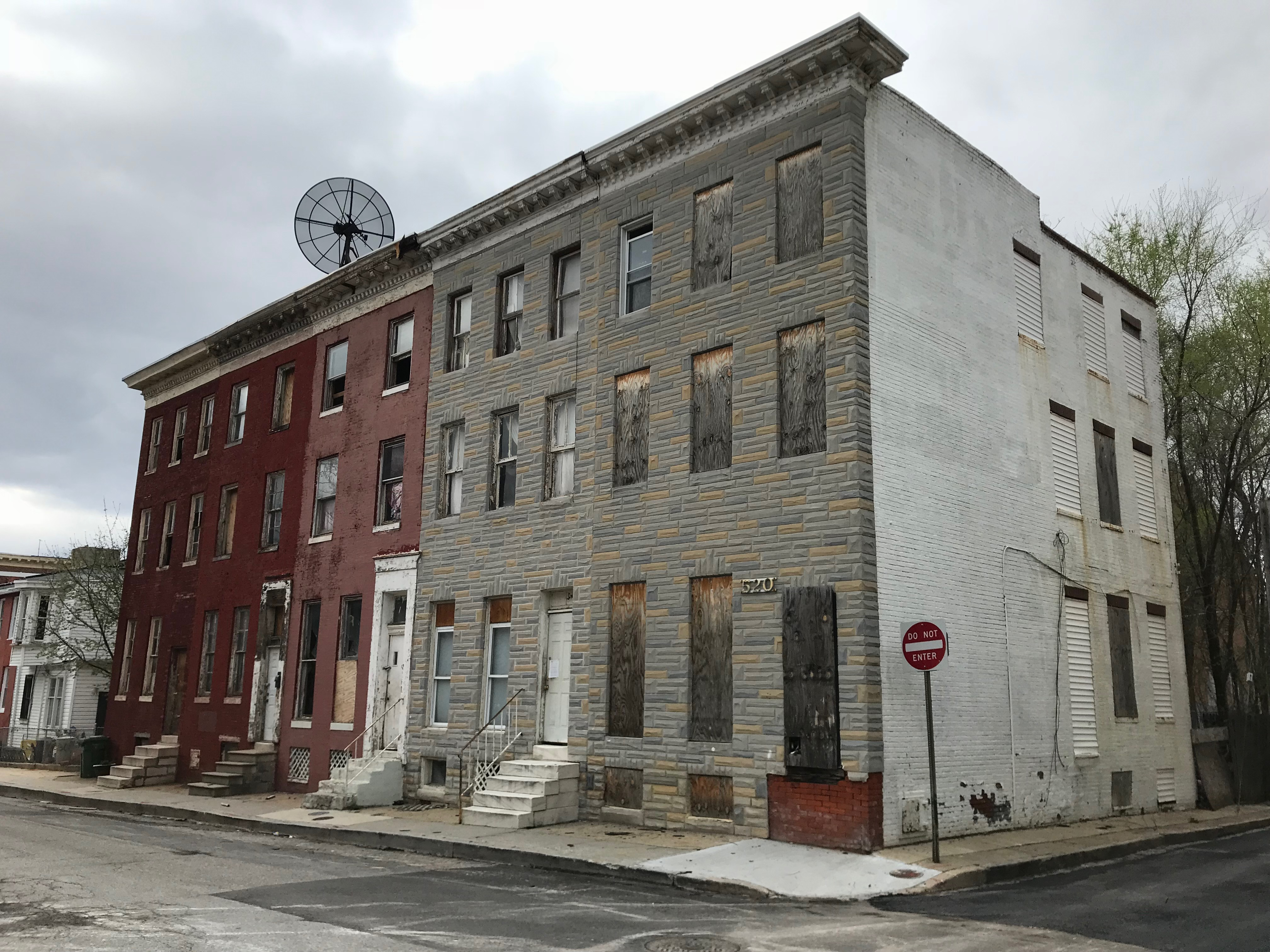
Harry T. Pratt Residence, 520 W. Lanvale Street, Baltimore

Pratt was an educator for 47 years in Baltimore City Public Schools. He is known as a being among the pioneer group of teachers who educated colored pupils in public schools since the Civil War. Pratt taught every grade from first through second year normal school. He served as the principal for numerous schools including Paul Lawrence Dunbar and Benjamin Banneker, to name a few. Pratt is credited with introducing the Alpha and Beta intelligence tests in colored schools.

In addition to his work as an educator, Pratt was a skilled violinist, performing solos at events in Baltimore.

Pratt retired in June 1945 due to age and health. He died on September 8, 1945, at 69 years old after a stroke.

== Legacy ==
In 2019, Harry T. Pratt was featured in the Maryland Institute Black Archives (MIBA) and exhibition Blackives: A Celebration of Black History at MICA.
