= Truly Hatchett =

American investor and politician (1881–1970)

- Born: June 17, 1881
- Died: April 1, 1970 (aged 88)
- Occupations: Real estate investor, State legislator
- Organization(s): Monument Lodge of Benevolent and Protective Order of Elks
- Known for: One of the first African Americans in the Maryland House of Delegates
- Office: Member of the Maryland House of Delegates
- Term: 1928
- Political party: Democratic

Truly Hatchett (June 17, 1881 – April 1, 1970) was a real estate investor and state legislator in Maryland. He and Emery Cole were the first African Americans to serve in the Maryland House of Delegates. He joined the House on November 2, 1954. Hatchett represented Baltimore, and was a Democrat. In 1928, he served as Exalted Ruler of the Monument Lodge of Benevolent and Protective Order of Elks.

He had two brothers, a half-brother, and three half-sisters.

== See also ==
- List of African-American officeholders (1900–1959)
- Harry A. Cole
