= Mark Fax =

American composer and professor of music

- Born: June 15, 1911; Baltimore, Maryland
- Died: January 2, 1974 Washington, DC
- Genres: Classical Music, Gospel Music
- Occupations: Composer, Educator
- Instrument: Organ

Mark Oakland Fax (15 June 1911 – 2 January 1974) was an American composer and a professor of music.

== Child prodigy ==
Born on June 15, 1911, in Baltimore, Maryland, Fax was a child prodigy. By age fourteen, Fax was employed as a theater organist playing scores to silent films in Baltimore's Regent Theater on Saturdays, and gospel music at an African American church on Sundays. Fax enrolled at Syracuse University on the advice of his brother, Elton Fax, an artist, who believed Syracuse faculty would take his aspirations as a classical composer seriously.

== Education ==
Mark studied at Syracuse University where he earned a B.Mus. in 1933, then at Eastman earning a Master's degree in composition. While at Eastman he studied with Howard Hanson. He completed his bachelor's of music degree with honours; won the prestigious Julius Rosenwald Fellowship in a national competition; and was elected to the All-University Honour Society. Depression-era conditions compelled him to turn down graduate fellowship offers, and he accepted a position at Paine College in Georgia, where he founded and chaired the music department. In 1942 Mark studied piano at Bennington College in Vermont. It was here that he wrote music for the Martha Graham Dance Troupe.

== Career ==
Feeling that he was stagnating artistically, he returned to Central New York in 1942 to study advanced composition at the Eastman School of Music. To support his family, he served as both choirmaster and janitor at a Rochester church until he won a rare second Rosenwald Fellowship. He taught at Black Mountain College in 1946. Fax also taught music at Paine College a (1934-1942),. From 1947 to 1972, Fax taught music theory at Howard University and served as director of the School of Music. Later, Fax became Acting Dean of Howard's College of Fine Arts. Concurrently, he served as music director at Washington's famed Asbury Methodist Church, where he acted as the music director, organist, and composer. Fax composed works for chorus, symphony, chamber ensemble, voice, piano and organ, in addition to two full-length operas, A Christmas Miracle (1958) and 'Til Victory Is Won (1967). Though many of Fax's compositions are unpublished many had been preserved by his wife and reproduced in dissertation on his work by Velma Jones, titled "The Life and Works of Mark Oakland Fax."

== Public attention ==
In the Washington limelight, he finally received public attention. Washington Post critic Paul Hume praised Fax's Sonata for Clarinet and Piano as "striking…difficult…a work of surprising contrapuntal texture" and declared the composer's oeuvre "music of rare power." 'Til Victory is Won (1967), Fax's epic operatic history of the African American experience, was mounted at the Kennedy Center. Hume says of Fax's opera ""A strong and valid artistic pronouncement" upon the trials of the time it was written. Mark Fax died January 2, 1974, in Washington, DC.

== Works list ==
=== Voice ===
- Deep river
- Dreams
- Five Black Songs (Advice to a child; Love; Only Dreams; Selfishness; The Refused)
- From an unknown soldier
- Go tell it on the mountain
- Great day!
- If he only walked in gardens
- Impulse
- Inspiration
- Longing
- Love
- May Day song
- Night truths
- Rain song
- Rondel
- Sunset
- Three Tenor Songs for the Worship Service (All people of the Earth; Dear Master in Whose Life; Wedding Song, Entreat me not to leave thee)
- Whatsoever a man soweth
- Who can find a virtuous woman?

=== Instrumental ===
- Three piano pieces
- Toccatina
- Three organ pieces
- The lost zoo. Symphonic suite

=== Opera ===
- A Christmas Miracle
- Till Victory is Won
