= Frank M. Conaway Jr. =

American politician (born 1963)

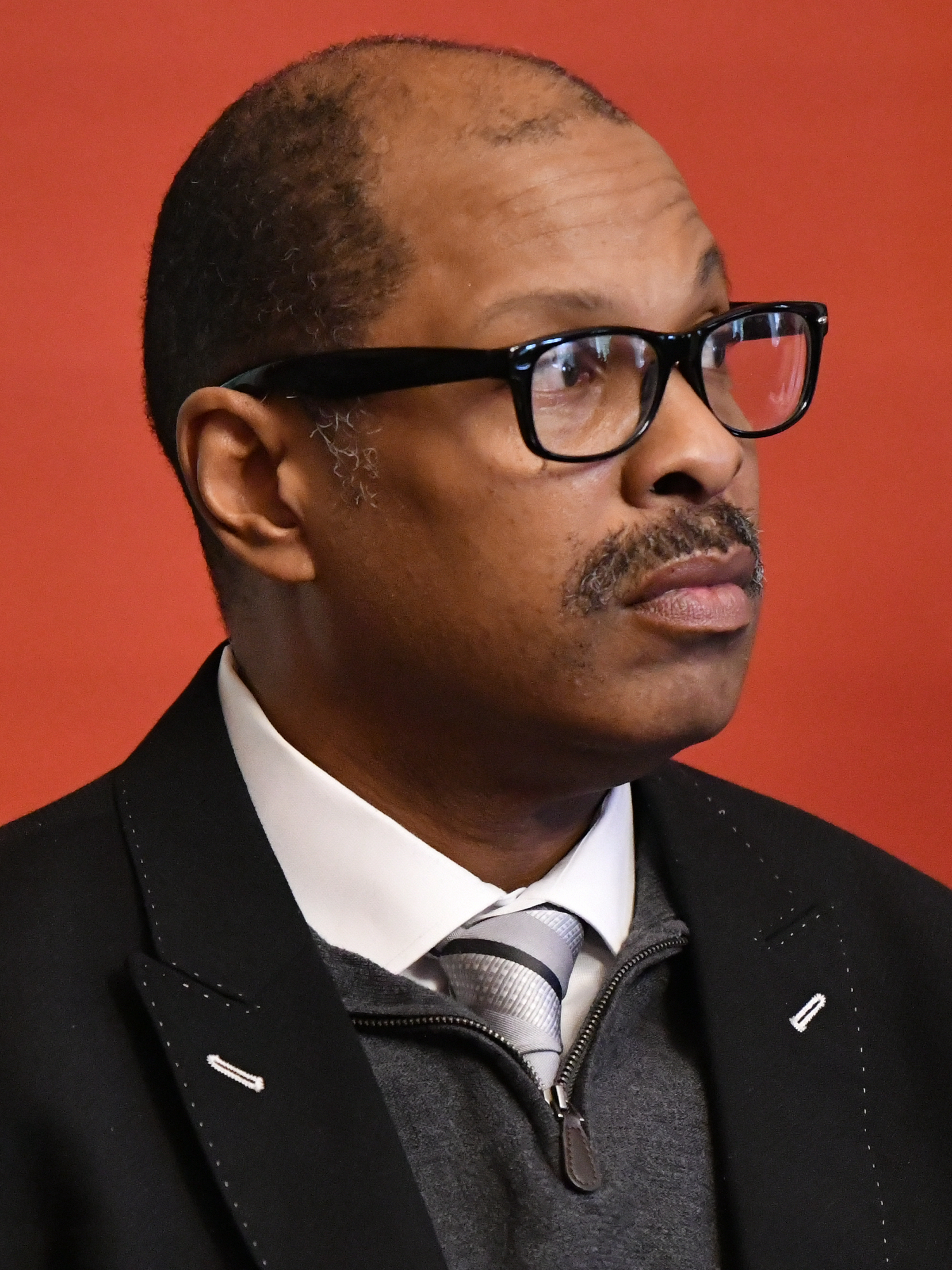
- Conaway in 2020

Member of the Maryland House of Delegates from the 40th district
- Incumbent
- Assumed office January 10, 2007 Serving with Melissa Wells, Marlon Amprey
- Preceded by: Marshall Goodwin

Personal details
- Born: January 4, 1963 (age 63) Baltimore, Maryland, U.S.
- Party: Democratic
- Spouse: Latesa Elaine Thomas (div. 2006)
- Children: 3
- Parent: Frank M. Conaway Sr. (father)
- Relatives: Belinda Conaway (sister)

Frank Melvin Conaway Jr. (born January 4, 1963) is an American politician who serves as a member of the Maryland House of Delegates representing the 40th district.

== Early life and education ==
Conaway was born in Baltimore to Frank M. Conaway Sr., who was a member of the Maryland House of Delegates and later as the clerk of the Baltimore City Circuit Court, and Mary Conaway, who served as the Baltimore Register of Wills. He attended Northwestern High School and later attended Howard University and Morgan State University from 1980 to 1984, and graduated from Sojourner–Douglass College in 1999 with a Bachelor of Arts degree in business administration.

== Career ==
After attending Morgan State, Conaway worked for construction firms Monumental Paint Contractors and Allied Bendix Corporation until 1986, when he started his own company, Frank M. Conaway Jr. & Associates Co., and replica kit-car business F-Dreams, Inc., which Conaway says was bankrupted by the North American Free Trade Agreement. Afterwards, he worked as a sales representative for various companies, including Olan Mills, from 1989 to 2005.

In 1992, Conaway and his father accused Olan Mills of firing them after Conaway Sr. caught the company using a secret racial code to alert employees when they were scheduled to work at Black churches, which the company used to steer the Conaways away from more lucrative white parishes. Olan Mills defended their use of racial codes as a "sales tool so that employees can take in the proper portrait samples for the community we're serving as customers". Following his firing, Conaway Jr. filed a discrimination complaint with the company.

Conaway is the author of the book Baptist Gnostic Christian Eubonic Kundalinion Spiritual Ki Do Hermeneutic Metaphysics: The Word: Hermeneutics and The 20 Pennies a Day Diet Plan.

== Political career ==
In 1999, Conaway unsuccessfully ran for President of the Baltimore City Council, losing to Sheila Dixon in the Democratic primary.

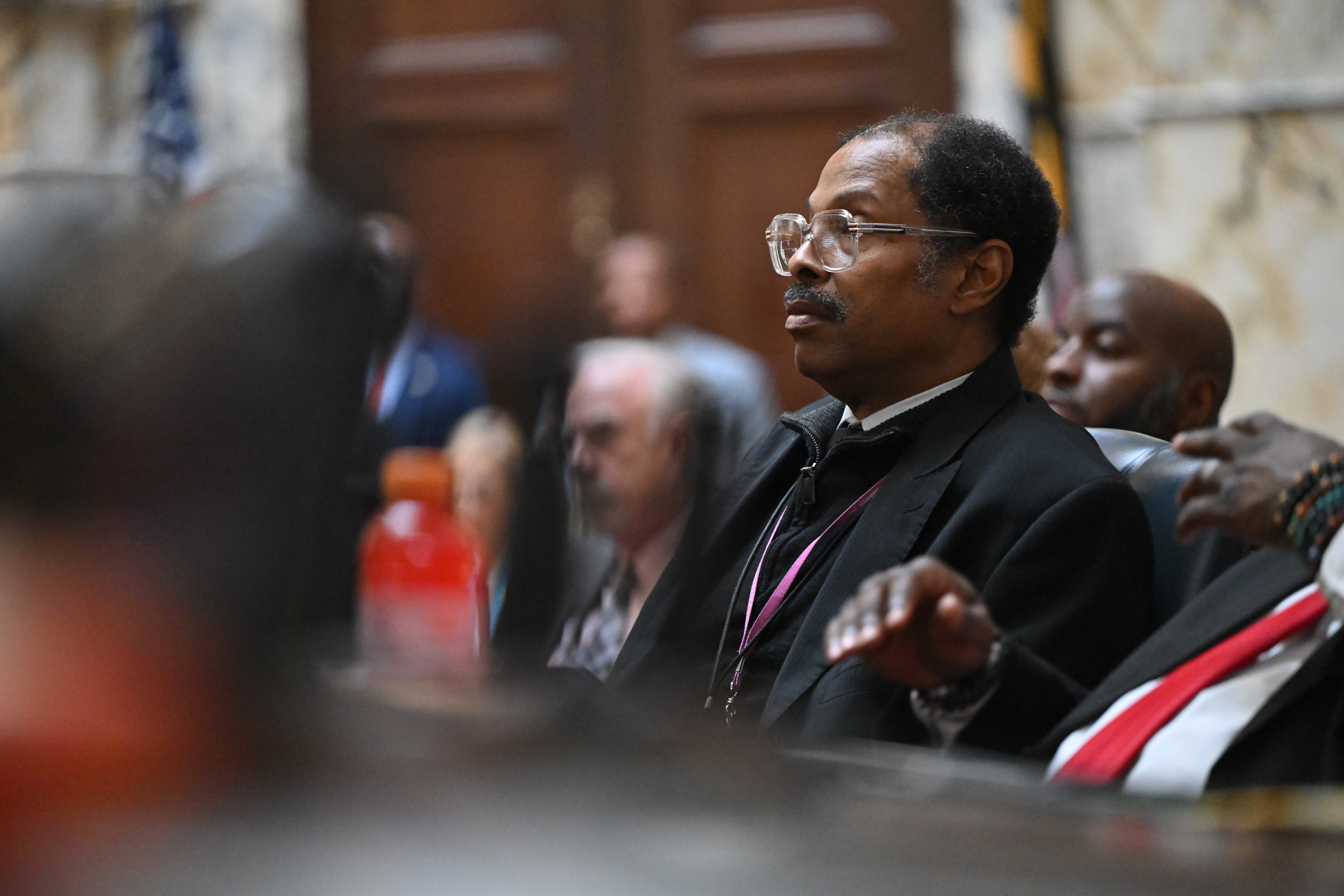
Conaway on the House floor, 2026

In 2006, Conaway successfully ran for the Maryland House of Delegates in District 40. He was sworn in on January 10, 2007, and was a member of the Judiciary Committee during his entire tenure.

Conaway ran for re-election in 2026, but was defeated in the Democratic primary in June.

== Political positions ==
=== Crime and policing ===
In August 2010, Conaway used campaign funds to purchase and give away 500 cameras to Baltimore residents to "snap pictures of crime in progress".

In 2013, Conaway voted for a bill to repeal the death penalty.

During the 2015 legislative session, Conaway introduced legislation requiring the attorney general of Maryland to investigate any case involving a police-involved death. The bill received an unfavorable committee report. He also introduced a bill that would double max payouts in police brutality cases, which passed and was signed into law by Governor Larry Hogan.

In 2016, Conaway introduced a bill that would allow video cameras in criminal sentencing hearings by filing a written request with the clerk of court. The bill received an unfavorable committee report.

During the 2019 legislative session, Conaway voted for a bill that would allow Johns Hopkins University to create its own private police force.

In 2023, Conaway introduced legislation backed by State's Attorney Ivan Bates to increase penalties for illegally carrying a handgun. The bill was later incorporated into the Gun Safety Bill of 2023, which was passed by the Maryland General Assembly in April, and signed into law by Governor Wes Moore in May 2023.

=== Economy and budget ===
During the 2007 legislative session, Conaway was one of two Democratic state delegates to vote against a bill cutting $500 million from the state budget.

In 2014, Conaway voted for a bill to raise the state's minimum wage to $10.10 by 2017.

=== Gun policy ===
During the 2013 legislative session, Conaway voted for the Firearm Safety Act, a bill that placed restrictions on firearm purchases and magazine capacity in semi-automatic rifles.

=== Immigration ===
During the 2026 legislative session, Conaway was the only Democrat to vote against a bill to prohibit counties from entering into 287(g) program agreements with U.S. Immigration and Customs Enforcement, arguing that the state is below the U.S. Department of Homeland Security. He was also the only Democrat to vote against bills to set minimum safety standards for private immigration detention centers and to prohibit approval of privately run immigration detention centers in areas that are not zoned for the use. In June 2026, Conaway defended his votes against these bills, saying that he doesn't "think this lack of cooperation with federal authorities is correct. I think it's bordering on sedition, being vocal about 'We're going against the Trump administration'".

=== Social issues ===
During the 2012 legislative session, Conaway voted for the Civil Marriage Protection Act, which legalized same-sex marriage in Maryland.

=== Taxes ===
During the 2013 legislative session, Conaway voted for a bill to index the state's fuel taxes to inflation to pay for state transportation projects.

== Personal life ==
Conaway was married to his wife, Latesa Elaine Thomas, and had three children—Frank III, Kelly, and Lacynda—prior to their divorce in 2006. In 2003, Thomas obtained a domestic violence protective order against Conaway, stating in court documents that he had "threatened to kill" her and had "pushed her face through a back door window".

According to court documents obtained by the Baltimore City Paper, Conaway has bipolar disorder, for which he has been taking medication.

=== YouTube videos ===
In late October 2014, Conaway received significant attention after he uploaded more than 50 videos to YouTube. In the videos, which were characterised as "rambling" and "bizarre", he talked about cryptograms in Ancient Egyptian carvings, the Book of Revelation, talking horses, Rubik's Cube, Sasquatch and Yeti. He also wondered if he was a hologram, referred to himself as "meta", advocated his weight loss book The 20 Pennies a Day Diet Plan by talking about canned chicken, Arizona Diet Green Tea and sugar free hard candies and promoted his other books, Trapezium Giza Pyramid Artificial Black Hole Theory, Baptist Gnostic Christian Eubonic Kundalinion Spiritual Ki Do Hermeneutic Metaphysics: The Word: Hermeneutics and Christian Kundalini Science- Proof of the Soul- Cryptogram Solution of Egyptian Stela 55001- & Opening the Hood of Ra.

In a phone interview with The Baltimore Sun, Conaway claimed to have deciphered artwork at the Walters Art Museum and said that it was "part of my duties as a Christian" to try and "spread the knowledge that I have". He also talked about Moses, Egyptian Obelisks, the "Frankenfish", the Fibonacci number and faces on Mars and said that he did not "believe" in evolution, arguing that "Darwin [said] that we descended from monkeys... I haven't seen any evidence to say man came from a monkey."

The videos appeared to have been filmed in the Baltimore City Hall mail room, where he had also worked since being hired as a clerk at the Municipal Post Office by Comptroller Joan Pratt in 2006. In November 2014, he resigned from his City Hall job and took down the videos. They have been preserved by web developer Chris Cook.

Despite widespread mockery and a general election write-in campaign from State Delegate Shawn Z. Tarrant, who had finished fourth in the Democratic primary for the three-seat district (there were no Republican candidates for the district), Conaway was re-elected in the 2014 elections.

== Electoral history ==
Baltimore City Council President Democratic primary election, 1999
Party	Candidate	Votes	%
Democratic	Sheila Dixon	59,565	56.6
Democratic	Nathan Irby	21,983	20.9
Democratic	Frank M. Conaway Jr.	16,704	15.9
Democratic	Shelton J. Stewart	2,822	2.7
Democratic	Kelley C. Brohawn	2,539	2.4
Democratic	David G. S. Greene	1,561	1.5

Maryland House of Delegates District 40 Democratic primary election, 2006
Party	Candidate	Votes	%
Democratic	Frank M. Conaway Jr.	5,889	21.0
Democratic	Barbara A. Robinson (incumbent)	5,889	21.0
Democratic	Shawn Z. Tarrant	4,126	14.7
Democratic	Antonio Hayes	4,046	14.4
Democratic	Marshall T. Goodwin (incumbent)	3,031	10.8
Democratic	Nolan Rollins	2,181	7.8
Democratic	Mark E. Hughes	2,151	7.7
Democratic	Sarah Louise Matthews	1,336	4.8
Democratic	Kinji Pierre Scott	685	2.4

Maryland House of Delegates District 40 election, 2006
Party	Candidate	Votes	%
Democratic	Frank M. Conaway Jr.	16,432	32.4
Democratic	Barbara A. Robinson (incumbent)	16,032	31.6
Democratic	Shawn Z. Tarrant	13,921	27.5
Green	Jan E. Danworth	4,135	8.2
Write-in		177	0.3

Maryland House of Delegates District 40 election, 2010
Party	Candidate	Votes	%
Democratic	Frank M. Conaway, Jr. (incumbent)	19,028	37.5
Democratic	Barbara A. Robinson (incumbent)	15,988	31.5
Democratic	Shawn Z. Tarrant (incumbent)	15,378	30.3
Write-in		324	0.6

Maryland House of Delegates District 40 election, 2014
Party	Candidate	Votes	%
Democratic	Antonio Hayes	14,430	31.7
Democratic	Frank M. Conaway Jr. (incumbent)	13,968	30.7
Democratic	Barbara A. Robinson (incumbent)	13,946	30.6
Democratic	Shawn Tarrant (incumbent, write-in)	2,814	6.2
Write-in		357	0.8

Maryland House of Delegates District 40 election, 2018
Party	Candidate	Votes	%
Democratic	Nick Mosby (incumbent)	19,726	30.5
Democratic	Melissa Wells	18,952	29.3
Democratic	Frank M. Conaway, Jr. (incumbent)	16,767	25.9
Green	Joshua Harris	8,833	13.6
Write-in		485	0.7

Maryland House of Delegates District 40 election, 2022
Party	Candidate	Votes	%
Democratic	Melissa Wells (incumbent)	20,872	32.7
Democratic	Frank M. Conaway, Jr. (incumbent)	20,052	31.4
Democratic	Marlon Amprey (incumbent)	19,778	31.0
Republican	Zulieka A. Baysmore	2,852	4.5
Write-in		328	0.5

== Works ==
- Baptist Gnostic Christian Eubonic Kundalinion Spiritual Ki Do Hermeneutic Metaphysics: The Word, iUniverse, 2001. ISBN 9780595206780
- The 20 Pennies a Day Diet Plan, Lulu.com, 2004. ISBN 9781300270089
