= Child Life (journal) =

- Discipline: Education
- Language: English

Publication details
- History: 1899–1939
- Publisher: Froebel Society (United Kingdom)

Standard abbreviations
- ISO 4: Child Life

Child Life was the Froebel Society journal between 1931 and 1939. However the journal has also been reported as being published, not necessarily continuously, and not always by the Froebel society itself, between 1899 and 1939. Its successors were the National Froebel Foundation Bulletin and the Froebel Journal.
