= William L. Adams (businessman) =

William L. "Little Willie" Adams (January 5, 1914 – June 27, 2011) was a prominent Baltimore businessman and venture capitalist known for bankrolling many African-American owned businesses in that city in the mid-twentieth century. Due to his business involvements, Adams was also a prominent figure in Baltimore politics, although he never held office himself.

== Early life ==
William L. Adams was born on January 5, 1914, in Zebulon, North Carolina, and moved to Baltimore in 1929. Adams attended Dunbar High School for several years, and worked several jobs during that time, including running numbers. He eventually ended up running his own numbers game. He married Victorine Quille on October 13, 1935, at St. Peter Claver Catholic Church.

== Business career ==
External videos
- "Little Willie" spurs Mondawmin's Growth WMAR-TV2 YouTube video

Adams used the profits from his illegal lottery to finance a number of legitimate businesses, including a real estate firm and a tavern. He owned Carr's Beach, a popular amusement park in Annapolis, MD, Since most banks would not lend to black-owned businesses at that time, Adams found opportunity investing in such businesses. His most successful investments included Parks Sausages and Super Pride supermarkets. In 1972, Sears, the largest retailer in Baltimore's Mondawmin Mall, pulled its store leaving the Mall without a suitable anchor. Adams purchased the abandoned building and lured in several businesses, including the Maryland Department of Motor Vehicles which helped save the Mall from bankruptcy. By the late 1970s, Adams' wealth was estimated at $40M.

== Legal issues ==
In 1951, Adams was subpoenaed to testify before Congress during an investigation into organized crime. At that time, he admitted to having run an illegal lottery in Baltimore, and the State of Maryland subsequently charged him with that crime. His conviction was overturned by the Supreme Court on the grounds that the state had violated Adams' Fifth Amendment rights by using his Congressional testimony.

In 1980, Adams was again charged with running an illegal lottery. He was found not guilty of these charges.

== Political and community involvement ==
Adams was instrumental in the election of Maryland's first black US Representative, Parren Mitchell. He started a scholarship program for students seeking to major in business, partnering with the NAACP and the United Negro College Fund. He received an honorary doctorate from the former Morris Brown College in Atlanta in 1977.
