= Harry Emerson Pratt =

American judge (1884–1957)

Judge of the United States District Court for the Territory of Alaska
- In office 1935–1954
- Appointed by: Franklin D. Roosevelt

Member of the Alaska Territorial Senate
- In office 1925–1928
- Constituency: Fourth District

Personal details
- Born: Harry Emerson Pratt; January 26, 1884 Norton, Kansas, U.S.
- Died: December 14, 1957 (aged 73) Fairbanks, Alaska, U.S.
- Party: Democratic
- Education: University of Colorado Boulder
- Occupation: Attorney, politician, judge

Harry Emerson Pratt (January 26, 1884 – December 14, 1957) was an American lawyer who served as a justice of the Alaska Territorial District Court from 1935 to 1954.

== Early life & political career ==
Born in Norton, Kansas, Pratt attended the University of Colorado Boulder from 1905 to 1909, where he was a member of the Beta Tau Chapter of Beta Theta Pi. He later settled in Fairbanks, Alaska, where he practiced law and became involved in territorial politics. Pratt served in the Alaska Territorial Senate representing the Fourth District, as a member of the Democratic Party, from 1925 to 1928.

== Judicial career ==
In 1935, President Franklin D. Roosevelt appointed Pratt to serve as a judge for the United States District Court for the Territory of Alaska, Fourth Judicial Division, in 1935. He served until 1954, presiding over federal and territorial legal matters before statehood in 1959.

In August 1953, Pratt appointed Ted Stevens as acting U.S. district attorney in Fairbanks, following the resignation of Robert McNealy. Stevens later became one of Alaska's longest-serving senators.

== Death ==
Pratt died on 1957, at the age of 73. He was cremated, and his ashes were interred at Fairbanks Cemetery in Alaska.

Political offices
Preceded by Charles E. Bunnell	Justice of the Alaska Territorial District Court; 1935–1954	Succeeded by Vernon D. Forbes
Preceded by Unknown	Member of the Alaska Territorial Senate from the Fourth District; 1925–1928	Succeeded by Unknown
