= Antonio Hayes =

American politician (born 1977)

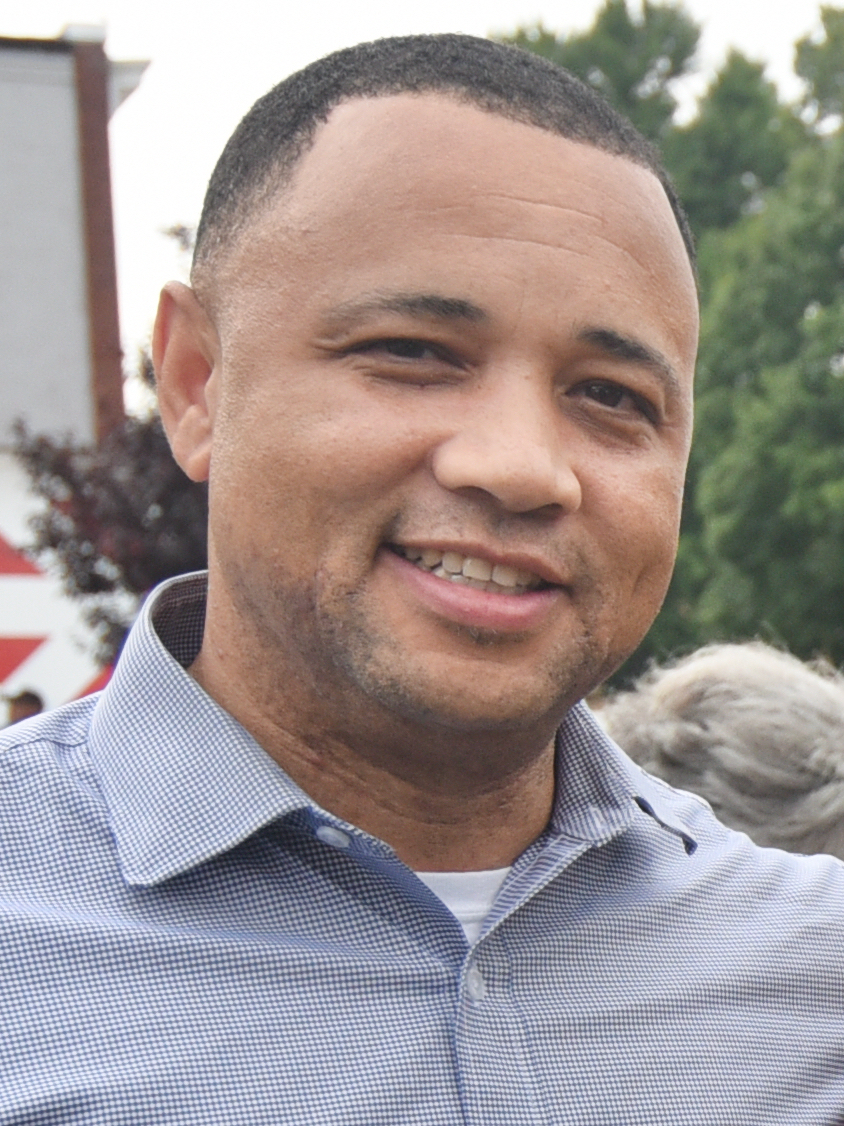

Member of the Maryland Senate from the 40th district
- Incumbent
- Assumed office January 9, 2019
- Preceded by: Barbara A. Robinson

Member of the Maryland House of Delegates from the 40th district
- In office January 14, 2015 – January 9, 2019 Serving with Barbara A. Robinson, Frank M. Conaway Jr., and Nick Mosby
- Preceded by: Shawn Z. Tarrant
- Succeeded by: Melissa Wells

Personal details
- Born: December 9, 1977 (age 48) Baltimore, Maryland, U.S.
- Party: Democratic
- Education: Frostburg State University

Antonio Lamar Hayes (born December 9, 1977) is an American politician who represents the 40th legislative district of Baltimore in the Maryland Senate. He previously represented the 40th district in the Maryland House of Delegates from 2015 to 2019.

== Early life and education ==
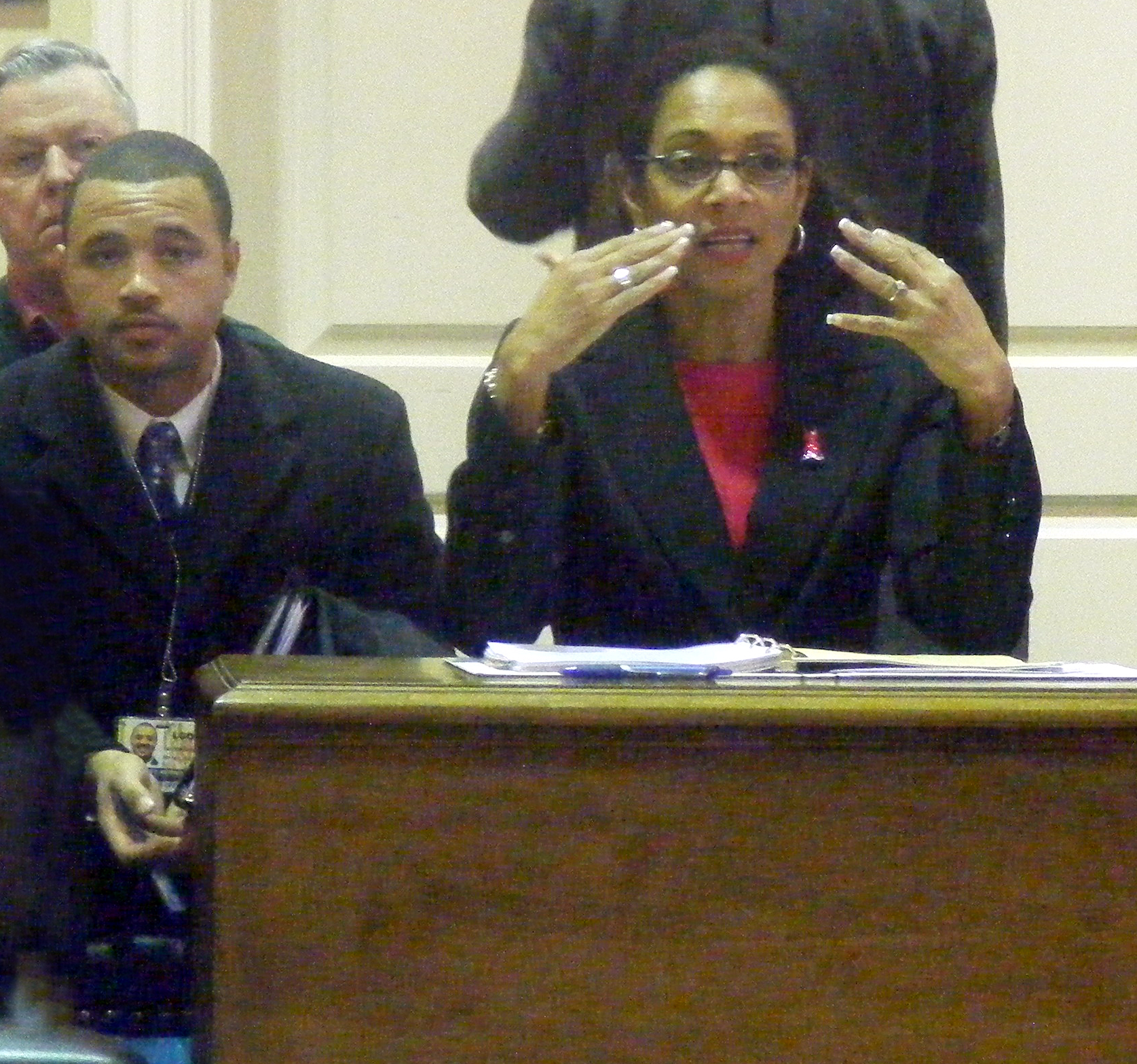
Hayes at a hearing in Annapolis with Mayor Sheila Dixon in 2009

Hayes was born and raised in Baltimore by his grandmother. He attended Frostburg State University, earning a Bachelor of Science degree in political science in 2000. Since 2010, Hayes has served as the chief of staff of the Baltimore City Department of Social Services.

== In the legislature ==
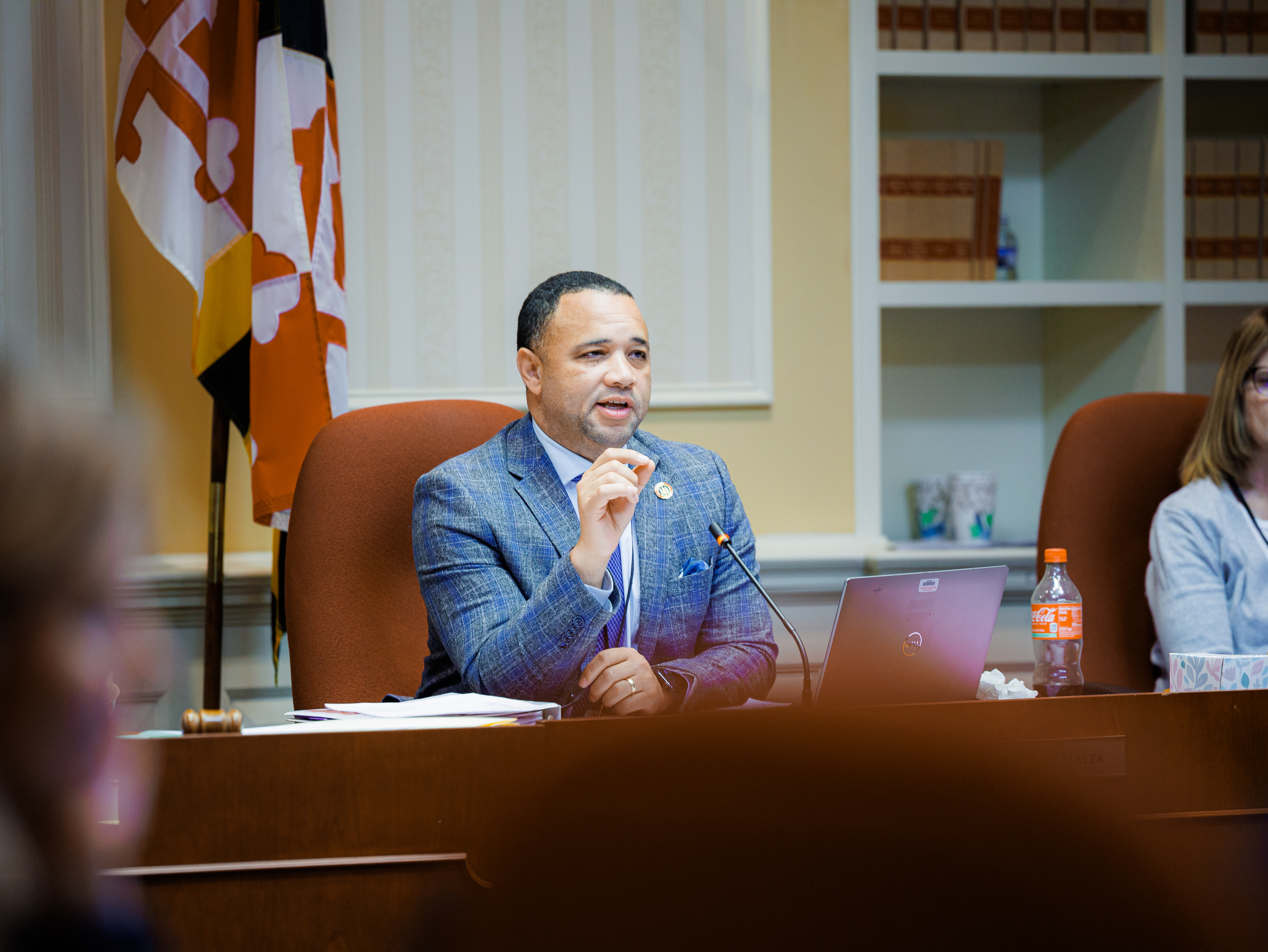
Hayes in the Senate Finance Committee, 2025

In 2014, Hayes defeated two-term incumbent Shawn Z. Tarrant to win a seat in the House of Delegates. He was sworn in on January 14, 2015. During his tenure, Hayes served as a member of the House Health and Government Operations Committee.

On July 29, 2017, Hayes announced that he would run for the Maryland Senate in 2018, challenging appointed state Senator Barbara A. Robinson for the seat formerly held by Mayor Catherine Pugh. He defeated Robinson in the Democratic primary, earning 65.4 percent of the vote. He ran in the general election unopposed.

Hayes was sworn into the Maryland Senate on January 9, 2019. He is a member of the Senate Finance Committee, serving as its vice chair from 2025 to 2027, afterwards becoming the committee's chair following the retirement of Pamela Beidle. Hayes also served as the Senate majority whip during the 2023 legislative session and as the vice chair of the Senate Democratic Caucus from 2020 to 2023. He is a member of the Baltimore City Senate Delegation and the Legislative Black Caucus of Maryland.

Following the death of U.S. Representative Elijah Cummings in October 2019, Hayes was seen as a possible candidate in the subsequent special election. Later that month, he said that he would not run for the seat.

In 2020, Hayes ran for national delegate pledged to Joe Biden in Maryland's 7th congressional district at the Democratic National Convention. He won the primary election, receiving 18.4 percent of the vote. He also served as a delegate to the 2024 Democratic National Convention, pledged to Kamala Harris.

== Political positions ==
=== Education ===
During the 2026 legislative session, Hayes introduced a bill that would allow the mayor of Baltimore to appoint members to Baltimore's school board with advice and consent of the Maryland Senate, replacing the current process that restricts school board appointments to a preapproved slate.

=== Electoral reform ===
In October 2025, Hayes expressed skepticism toward mid-decade redistricting in Maryland, saying that he wasn't sure "the juice was worth the squeeze" in countering the second presidency of Donald Trump. In February 2026, he opposed holding a floor vote on a bill that would redraw Maryland's congressional districts to improve the Democratic Party's chances of winning the 1st congressional district, the only congressional district held by Republicans in the state, saying it was "too late" to move a map and give the Maryland State Board of Elections enough time to make the changes needed to run an election.

During the 2026 legislative session, Hayes voted against a bill that would replace the party central committee appointment process used to fill vacancies in the Maryland General Assembly with special elections held at the same time as regular state primary elections, saying that the central committee appointment process has "afforded us to have one of the most diverse legislatures in the country" and switching to special elections would negatively affect African American candidates that "don't typically have the same amount of resources needed in campaigns".

=== Paid family leave ===
During the 2020 legislative session, Hayes introduced the "Time to Care Act", a bill that would provide Maryland workers with up to 12 weeks of paid family leave. The bill was reintroduced in 2021 and 2022, during which it passed and became law after the General Assembly voted to override Governor Larry Hogan's veto.

=== Social issues ===
In April 2026, Hayes expressed concerns with a bill to designate a Muslim American Heritage Month and Jewish American Heritage Month in Maryland, saying that while he understood the symbolism and people behind the legislation, he had a "serious problem with the process that were are in the final days of the legislative session, committing so much time and energy to something that I think creates even more division".

== Personal life ==
Hayes is a congregant at the Empowerment Temple African Methodist Episcopal Church in Baltimore.

== Electoral history ==
Maryland House of Delegates District 40 Democratic Primary Election, 2014
Party	Candidate	Votes	%
Democratic	Antonio Hayes	4,921	18.9
Democratic	Frank M. Conaway Jr.	4,324	16.6
Democratic	Barbara A. Robinson	4,921	16.3
Democratic	Shawn Z. Tarrant	4,034	15.5
Democratic	Marvin "Doc" Cheatham	3,496	13.4
Democratic	Rob "Bobby" LaPin	1,564	6.0
Democratic	Quianna M. Cooke	1,169	4.5
Democratic	Douglas R. Barry	927	3.6
Democratic	Bill Marker	761	2.9
Democratic	Timothy Mercer	665	2.5

Maryland House of Delegates District 40 Election, 2014
Party	Candidate	Votes	%
Democratic	Antonio Hayes	14,430	31.7
Democratic	Frank M. Conaway Jr.	13,968	30.7
Democratic	Barbara A. Robinson	13,946	30.7
Democratic	Shawn Tarrant (Write-In)	2,814	6.2
Write-In		357	0.8

Maryland Senate District 40 Democratic Primary Election, 2018
Party	Candidate	Votes	%
Democratic	Antonio Hayes	7,920	65.4
Democratic	Barbara A. Robinson	4,185	34.6

Maryland Senate District 40 Election, 2018
Party	Candidate	Votes	%
Democratic	Antonio Hayes	26,960	98.7
Write-In		349	1.3
