= Frederick Douglass High School (Baltimore) =

Public high school in Maryland, USA

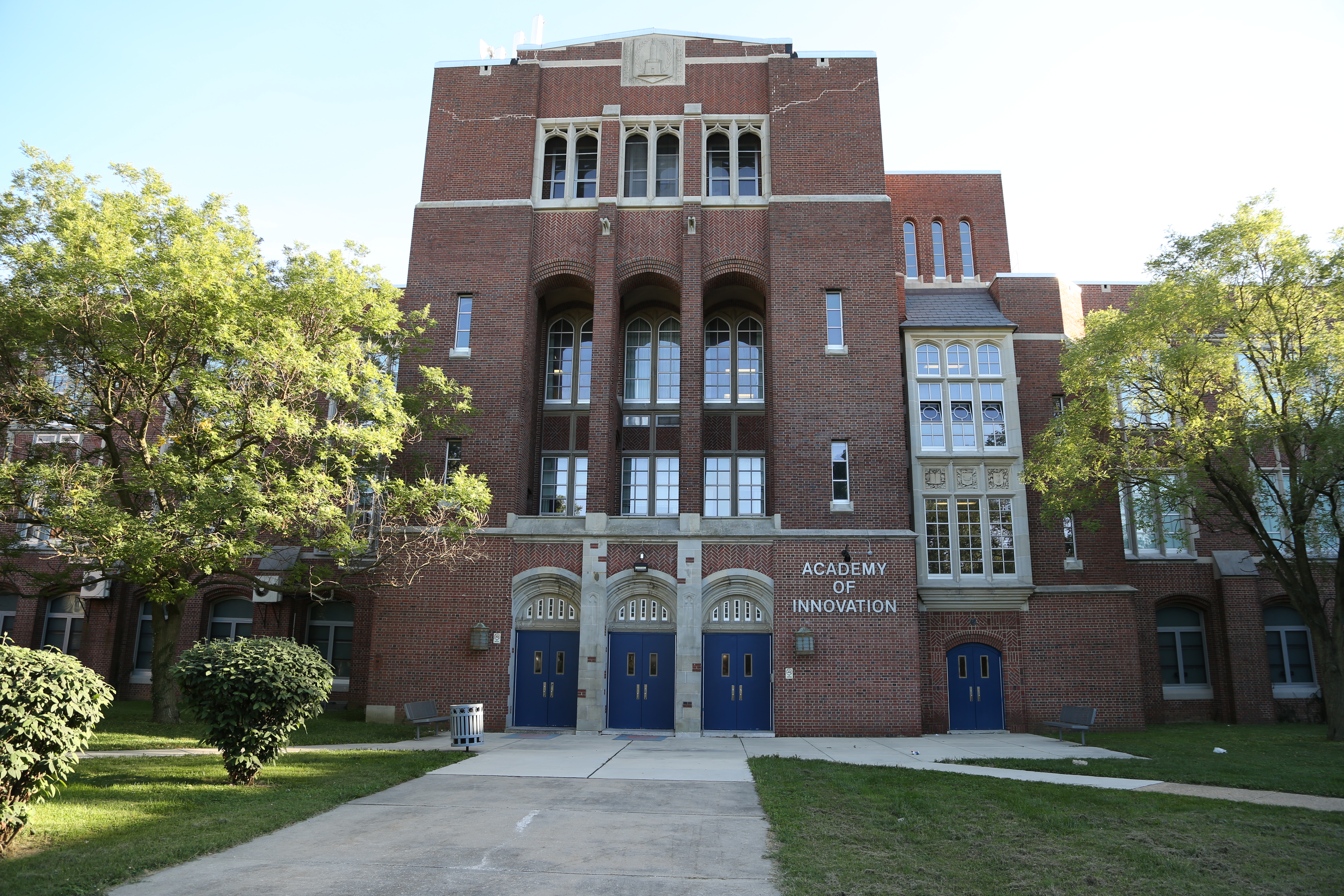

Location
- 2301 Gwynns Falls Parkway; Baltimore, Maryland 21217; United States; 39.3148°N 76.6549°W

Information
- School type: Public, comprehensive
- Motto: "Continuing the Tradition with Pride, Dignity, and Excellence"
- Founded: 1883
- School district: Baltimore City Public Schools
- Superintendent: Sonja Brookins Santelises
- School number: 450
- Principal: Dr. David Verdi
- Grades: 9–12
- Enrollment: 539 (2025)
- Area: Urban
- Colors: Dark blue and orange
- Mascot: The Mighty Ducks
- Team name: The Mighty Ducks (boys); Lady Ducks (girls)
- Website: baltimorecityschools.sites.thrillshare.com/o/douglass/

Frederick Douglass High School, established in 1883, is an American public high school in the Baltimore City Public Schools district. Originally named the Colored High and Training School, Douglass is the second-oldest U.S. high school created specifically for African American students. Prior to desegregation, Douglass and Paul Laurence Dunbar High School were the only two high schools in Baltimore that admitted African-American students, with Douglass serving students from West Baltimore and Dunbar serving students from East Baltimore.

Former Supreme Court Justice Thurgood Marshall (1908–1993) is one of Douglass's most notable alumni. After graduating from Douglass in 1926, Marshall went on to college and law school, passing the bar and becoming a lawyer. Representing the NAACP, he successfully challenged school segregation in the landmark Supreme Court case, Brown v. Board of Education (1954). The Supreme Court ruled that segregated, separate but equal, in public education was unconstitutional because it could never truly be equal.

Due to residential segregation and changes in the demographics of Baltimore, as of 2008 the overwhelming majority of students at Douglass were African American and many were poor. It was one of the eleven lowest performing schools in the state of Maryland.

== History ==
Named the "Colored High and Training School", Douglass was founded in 1883 for black students in Baltimore, as the school system was racially segregated. The first site was the former Peale's Baltimore Museum. Six years later it moved to a site on East Saratoga Street near St. Paul Street (now developed as present-day "Preston Gardens" terraces, named for the former mayor in the five city blocks - north to south - from East Centre Street to East Lexington Streets). This was near and only a few blocks away to the northwest from the former Douglass Institute of 1865 and previous Newton University buildings dating from the 1840s on East Lexington Street (on the north side - between North Calvert Street and North Street [now Guilford Avenue]) which famed Frederick Douglass (1808–1895), who lived in this city during the 1830s, spoke at its dedication. The new high school for young Black Baltimoreans was the only one for African-Americans students in the City of Baltimore for three decades until Paul Laurence Dunbar High School was built and opened in 1931 on North Caroline Street (off Orleans Street) as a junior-senior high school in East Baltimore. At the time, there was also emphasis on training for industrial jobs.

On June 22, 1894, a year before his death, Frederick Douglass gave a commencement address at what would become a namesake school, saying:

"The colored people of this country have, I think, made a great mistake, of late, in saying so much of race and color as a basis of their claims to justice, and as the chief motive of their efforts and action. I have always attached more importance to manhood than to mere identity with any variety of the human family..." "We should never forget that the ablest and most eloquent voices ever raised in behalf of the black man's cause were the voices of white men. Not for race, not for color, but for men and for manhood they labored, fought, and died. Away, then, with the nonsense that a man must be black to be true to the rights of black men."

In 1900, the high and technical school moved from East Saratoga Street near St. Paul Street to a building in the northwest city on the corner of Dolphin Street and Pennsylvania Avenue.

In 1900, the Baltimore City Public Schools system initiated a one-year training course for African-American elementary school teachers at the then-called Colored High School. By 1902, the training program was expanded to a two-year Normal Department within the high school. Seven years later it was separated from the high school and given its own principal, forming what would eventually become Coppin State University, one of Maryland's Historically Black Colleges and Universities. By 1938, Coppin had developed a four-year curriculum and the college began to grant Bachelor of Science degrees.

The high school moved in 1925 to its third location, a new building specifically designed for the high school was constructed of red brick and limestone trim, in the English Tudor/Jacobethan style, on the intersection at Calhoun and Baker Streets, but without a surrounding campus but facing directly on surrounding sidewalks. The new building was dedicated as "Frederick Douglass High School", the school had been using the new name for at least two years previously. For the first time in Baltimore, black students had a gymnasium, a library, and cafeteria.

Since 1954, following the racial integration of Baltimore City public schools, Douglass High has been located on Gwynns Fall Parkway across from "Mondawmin" - the noted city financiers' Alexander and George Brown's estate, one of the last rural country estates in the city, which was shortly after razed and redeveloped as Mondawmin Mall by developer James Rouse (also did "Harborplace" in Inner Harbor in 1979–1980) in the previous Western High School building and extensive landscaped campus, constructed in 1927–1928. (This building is a twin of the old Eastern High School building on East 33rd Street and Loch Raven Boulevard on the opposite side of the city in Northeast Baltimore, across from The Baltimore City College - the famous landmark - "Castle on the Hill"). The campus of Coppin State College (now Coppin State University), which had long been located at the high school, is across the street .

== Recent history ==
In 2008, Frederick Douglass High School was the subject of an HBO documentary: Hard Times at Douglass High: A No Child Left Behind Report Card, directed by Oscar award-winning filmmakers Alan Raymond and Susan Raymond. They shot the film during the 2004 - 2005 school year, highlighting its history and its academic and financial struggles while working to comply with the No Child Left Behind Act.

In the 2024–25 and 2025-26 school years, all classes were moved to a different location to allow for extensive renovation of the original school building. Instead, classes were scheduled to take place at 6900 Park Heights Avenue, Baltimore, from August 2024 to June 2026.

== Demographics and statistics ==
Douglass High School had 539 students in 2025, down from 886 in 2014, 784 in 2022 and less than half the 2007 enrollment of 1,151 students. In 2007, African American students made up 99% of the total student population with 53% qualifying for free lunch. As of 2025, African American students made up 82% and Hispanic students made up 15% of the student body. About one in seven students is homeless (up from 5% in 2022 to 15% in 2025). In addition, over 95% of students are eligible for free or reduced-price meals.

The school had 46 teachers in 2025, for a 1:12 teacher per pupil ratio. Over one in three teachers (35%) were licensed with provisional/emergency teaching credentials, up from 13% in 2021.

As of 2025, the four-year graduation rate was 62%, while the student body's chronic absenteeism rate (defined as missing at least 10% of school days) was 84%.

== Notable alumni ==
- Mark Andrews (graduated 1992), musician with stage name Sisqó
- Sallie Blair, jazz singer
- Eubie Blake, American pianist and composer of ragtime, jazz, and popular music
- Clarence W. Blount, first African American majority leader (1983–2003) in the Maryland State Senate
- Lucy Diggs Slowe, founding member of Alpha Kappa Alpha, first Dean of Women at Howard University and also a tennis champion, winning the national title of the American Tennis Association's first tournament in 1917, the first African-American woman to win a major sports title.
- Frank Boston, member of the Maryland House of Delegates (1987–1999)
- Paul Brent, pianist, and the first African American to attend the Peabody Conservatory of Music.
- James "Buster" Brown (graduated 1932), tap dancer
- Anne Brown, American soprano for whom George Gershwin rewrote the role of Bess in the original production of Porgy and Bess
- Roger W. Brown (graduated 1959), Baltimore City Circuit Court judge (1987–2002)
- Nellie A. Buchanan (graduated 1917), taught at Douglass from 1923 to 1970
- E. Franklin Frazier (graduated 1912), American sociologist
- Blanche Calloway, American jazz singer, composer, and bandleader
- Cab Calloway (graduated 1925), jazz singer and bandleader
- Paula Campbell (graduated 2001), recording artist
- Harry A. Cole, first African American elected to the Maryland General Assembly
- Samuel James Cornish (did not graduate), first Poet Laureate of Boston
- Isaiah Dixon (graduated 1941), member of the Maryland House of Delegates (1967–1982)
- Ethel Ennis, jazz singer
- Elton Fax, illustrator
- Mark Fax, American composer and professor
- Dru Hill, R&B recording group
- Lillie Mae Carroll Jackson, veteran civil rights activist, founder Baltimore's NAACP branch
- Terry Johnson, singer, songwriter, and music producer, lead singer of the 1950s Baltimore doo-wop group, The Flamingos
- Marie Johnson-Calloway (née Marie Edwards; 1920–2018), artist, educator and activist
- Bill Kenny, lead singer of, and his brother, Herb Kenny, singer in The Ink Spots
- Thomas Henderson Kerr Jr., classical pianist, organist, music teacher, and composer
- Labtekwon, hip hop artist
- Ellis Larkins, American jazz pianist
- Thurgood Marshall (graduated 1925), U.S. Supreme Court Justice
- Kweisi Mfume, U.S. Congressman (1987–1996)(2020- ), former president/CEO of the NAACP
- Clarence M. Mitchell, Jr., civil rights activist, namesake of the Baltimore City Circuit Courthouses
- Juanita Jackson Mitchell, civil rights activist, lawyer, first African American female to practice law in Maryland
- Parren Mitchell, U.S. Congressman (1971–1987)
- George B. Murphy Jr. (1906–1986) newspaper editor, journalist, and civil rights leader
- Margaret "Peggy" Murphy, first black woman to chair the Baltimore City Delegation
- Henry E. Parker, Connecticut State Treasurer (1975–1986)
- Alfred Prettyman, philosopher
- Pete Rawlings, appropriations chairman in the Maryland House of Delegates
- Bishop L. Robinson, first African American police commissioner of Baltimore, Maryland
- Shinique Smith, Renown Painter and Sculptor

== Notable faculty ==
- G. David Houston, Professor of English at Howard University
- Harry Truman Pratt Sr., former alumnus and later principal of the school, educator and business leader
- William Llewellyn Wilson, conductor, musician and music educator
