= Pete Rawlings =

American politician

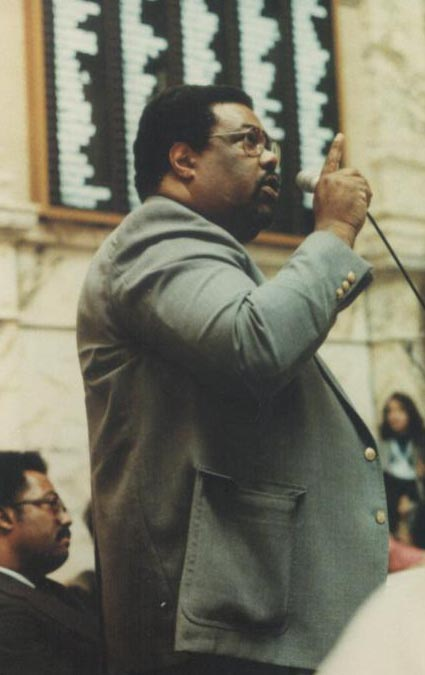
- Rawlings in 1990

Member of the Maryland House of Delegates from the 40th district
- In office January 10, 1979 – November 14, 2003
- Preceded by: Lloyal Randolph
- Succeeded by: Marshall Goodwin
- Constituency: Baltimore City

Personal details
- Born: Howard Peters Rawlings; March 17, 1937 Baltimore, Maryland
- Died: November 14, 2003 (aged 66) Baltimore, Maryland, U.S.
- Party: Democratic
- Spouse: Nina Cole
- Children: 3 children (including Stephanie)
- Occupation: Teacher, mentor

Howard Peters "Pete" Rawlings (March 17, 1937 – November 14, 2003) was an American politician and the first African American to become chair of the powerful Appropriations Committee in the Maryland House of Delegates. Rawlings served the 40th legislative district, located in the central, northwest section of Baltimore, from 1979 until 2003. His daughter, Stephanie Rawlings-Blake, is the former Mayor of Baltimore.

== Background ==
Delegate Rawlings was born in Baltimore on March 17, 1937 to Howard Toussaint Rawlings and Beatrice (Peters) Rawlings. His father worked as a custodian in a department store and then for U.S. Postal Service. Rawlings and his five brothers and sisters grew up in the segregated public housing project called the Poe Homes. He graduated from Douglass High School in 1954, one of the three schools African Americans were allowed to attend prior to the Supreme Court Decision in Brown v. Board of Education. He earned a B.S. in mathematics from Morgan State College, an M.S. in mathematics from the University of Wisconsin–Madison, and completed Ph.D. coursework at the University of Maryland. Rawlings was a professor of mathematics at the University of Maryland, Baltimore County from 1969-1972. While at UMBC, he served as the chair of the UMBC Black Caucus of Faculty & Staff and the Black Coalition of the University of Maryland Campuses.

== In the Legislature ==
Delegate Rawlings was a member of Maryland's House of Delegates from January 10, 1979 until his death on November 14, 2003. He was appointed chairman of the Appropriations Committee in 1992. In his years as chairman, Delegate Rawlings developed a reputation for integrity, dedication to his city, and a detailed knowledge of the state budget. He was in the forefront of reforming inner-city public schools, including requiring accountability from Baltimore school officials for lack of educational progress, waste of state funds, and allegations of fraud in spending those funds. He co-sponsored legislation that banned racial profiling in Maryland and fought against Maryland Lottery drawings expanding to Sundays. He also played an instrumental role in securing funding for the Reginald F. Lewis Museum of Maryland African American History & Culture.

=== Legislative notes ===
- voted for electric deregulation in 1999 (HB703)
- voted for income tax reduction in 1998 (SB750)

In addition to his legislative responsibilities, Delegate Rawlings sat on various boards and taskforces including the Maryland Education Coalition, the Maryland Historical Society, the Maryland Low Income Housing Coalition, Governor's Task Force to Reform the State Personnel Management System, the Task Force on Education Funding Equity, Accountability, and Partnerships and the Task Force to Study the Governance, Coordination, and Funding of the University System of Maryland.

== Political leader ==
In 1999, after Kurt Schmoke, Baltimore's three-term mayor, decided not to seek re-election, Rawlings started a search for Baltimore's next mayor. At first he tried to encourage NAACP president Kweisi Mfume to run, but Mfume declined. He then threw his support behind Baltimore City Council member Martin O'Malley in the mayoral election. It was a risky choice because O'Malley, who is white, was running against two African-American candidates in a city that was and still is majority African-American, and Rawlings himself was African-American.

== Personal life ==
He married Nina Cole. They had three children: Wendell, Lisa and Stephanie.

== Legacy ==
Less than a month before his death, Rawlings was named the national education Policy Leader of the Year by the National Association of State Boards of Education (NASBE). At the award ceremony in Baltimore, Brenda Welburn, NASBE Executive Director said "Delegate Rawlings has been a long-time champion of expanding educational opportunities and access for all of Maryland's students. He has also been in the national forefront of insisting upon greater accountability from our education system, both of teacher performance and student achievement, as well as focusing on closing the achievement gap among minority students. In demanding resources for results, his overriding concern has always been focused on best helping students succeed".

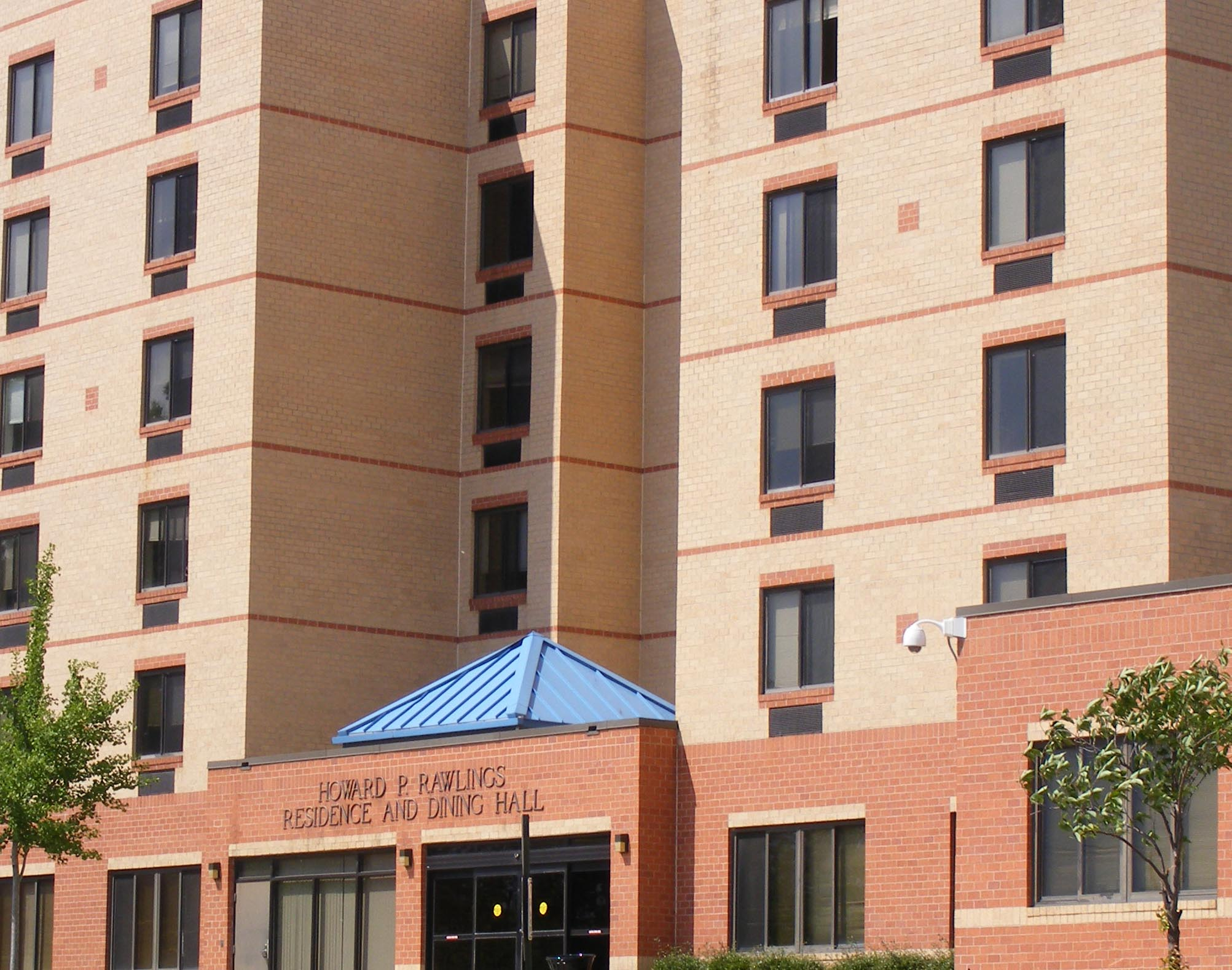
Howard P. Rawlings Residence and Dining Hall

Delegate Rawlings succumbed to cancer on November 14, 2003. Two days after his death, the Baltimore Sun ran an editorial entitled "Pete" which included this quote: "With the death of Del. Howard P. "Pete" Rawlings, Maryland lost an extraordinarily gifted leader and one of the most accomplished politicians of his era - known for both a tight fist and a caring heart." During the first legislative session after his death, Delegate Rawlings was recognized with the First Citizen Award of the Maryland Senate. The Howard Peters Rawlings Conservatory and Botanic Gardens of Baltimore and the Howard P. Rawlings Residence and Dining Hall at Morgan State University have been named in his honor.

"A politician worries about the next election. A true statesman worries about the next generation, and children yet unborn, and that was Pete Rawlings."

-Congressman Elijah Cummings

His daughter, Stephanie Rawlings-Blake, assumed the office of Mayor of Baltimore on February 4, 2010, following the resignation of Mayor Sheila Dixon.

The Rawlings Undergraduate Leadership Fellows program, located in the University of Maryland School of Public Policy, was named in his honor. The program provides education in leadership development, training in advocacy, and professional development opportunities to a select cohort of undergraduate students.
