= Jay Jalisi =

American politician (born 1965)

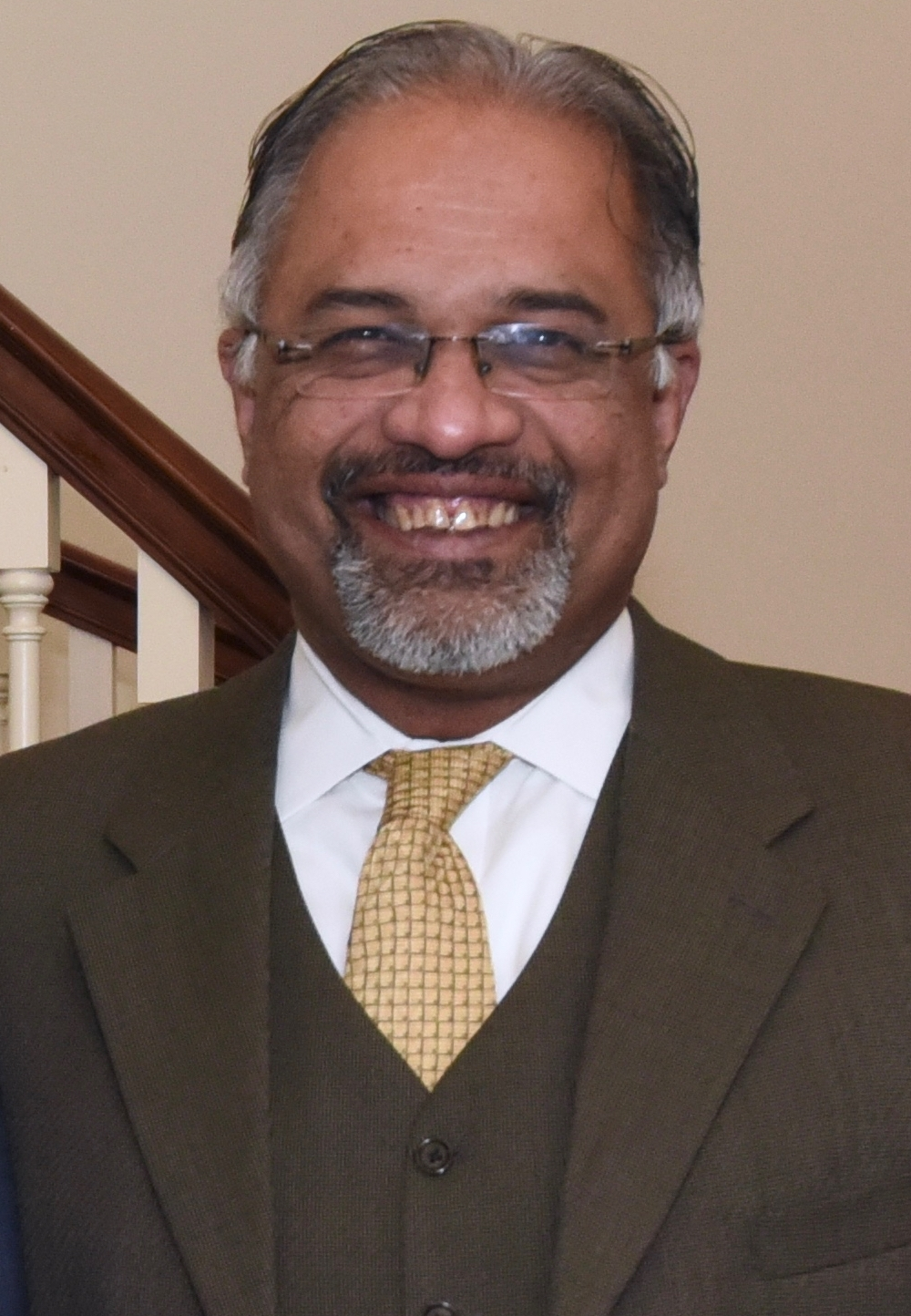
- Jalisi in 2018

Member of the Maryland House of Delegates from the 10th district
- In office January 14, 2015 – January 11, 2023 Serving with Benjamin Brooks (D) and Adrienne A. Jones (D)
- Preceded by: Emmett C. Burns Jr. Shirley Nathan-Pulliam
- Succeeded by: N. Scott Phillips

Personal details
- Born: November 17, 1965 (age 60) Hyderabad, Pakistan
- Party: Democratic
- Children: 2
- Education: University of Karachi (M.D.); Johns Hopkins University (M.P.H.)
- Profession: Medical doctor Real estate investor

Hasan "Jay" Jalisi (born November 17, 1965) is an American politician who was a Democratic member of the Maryland House of Delegates for District 10, based in Baltimore County, from 2015 to 2023. In 2022, he unsuccessfully ran for Maryland Senate, placing second to state Delegate Benjamin Brooks.

== Early life and career ==
Jalisi was born on November 17, 1965, in Hyderabad, Sindh, Pakistan. His family is from India and later moved to Pakistan, and then to Bangladesh, where his father taught at a medical school. He graduated from B. V. S. Parsi High School in Karachi, Pakistan and later attended the University of Karachi, where he earned a M.D. degree in 1990. After graduating, he moved to the United States and worked positions at Harvard University and the Cleveland Clinic. He came to Baltimore in 1997 to attend Johns Hopkins University, where he earned a M.P.H. degree in international health systems in 1998. While at Hopkins, Jalisi got into real estate investing, using money from family members to buy an apartment building where he lived after learning it was in foreclosure. He was previously a medical doctor and has co-authored two medical textbooks on diseases of the ears, nose, and throat, but eventually stepped back from his medical career to become a full-time real estate investor.

== In the legislature ==
In December 2013, Jalisi filed to run for the Maryland House of Delegates in District 10. He won the Democratic primary, receiving 17.4 percent of the vote, coming in second only behind Delegate Adrienne A. Jones. Jalisi won the general election with 28.7 percent of the vote. Jalisi was sworn into the Maryland House of Delegates on January 14, 2015. Up until the appointment of Bilal Ali, he was the only Muslim serving in the Maryland General Assembly.

Jalisi was a member of the Judiciary Committee in 2015, afterwards serving on the Environment and Transportation Committee until 2023. He was also a member of the Legislative Black Caucus of Maryland, the Maryland Military Installation Legislative Caucus, and the Maryland Legislative Asian-American and Pacific-Islander Caucus.

In November 2019, Jalisi filed to run in the 2020 Maryland 7th congressional district special election to fill out the term of the late Elijah Cummings, and in the overlapping regular 2020 election for the same congressional seat. He was defeated by Kweisi Mfume in the Democratic primary for both elections.

In April 2022, Jalisi filed to run for Maryland Senate to succeed retiring Senator Delores G. Kelley. He was defeated in the Democratic primary, placing second to state Delegate Ben Brooks.

== Post-legislative career ==
In February 2026, Jalisi filed to run for the Maryland House of Delegates in the 10th district. He was defeated in the Democratic primary on June 23, 2026, placing fifth with 12.7% of the vote.

In June 2026, ahead of the Democratic primary, Jalisi claimed that his name was being left off of some computerized ballots for Democratic voters in one precinct; the Maryland State Board of Elections rejected Jalisi's claims, attributing the confusion to how ballot-marking devices display candidates rather than any omission from the ballot itself. In August 2026, Jalisi filed a lawsuit against the Maryland State Board of Elections, claiming that the so-called ballot error caused him to lose the election and seeking a re-run of the Democratic primary in District 10.

== Legal affairs ==
In February 2015, Jalisi's daughter filed for a restraining order against him, accusing him of slapping her during an altercation at his wife's home in Lutherville, Maryland. A temporary restraining order was granted, then extended on March 2 after neither Jalisi nor his attorney appeared in court. On March 9, Jalisi and his daughter entered into a consent agreement without a finding of abuse, preventing him from visiting his daughter for a year. Following the incident, House Speaker Michael E. Busch moved Jalisi from the House Judiciary Committee to the House Environment and Transportation Committee.

In March 2019, an ethics committee investigation found that Jalisi subjected his staffers, particularly female employees, to bullying and verbal abuse over a span of five years. The report also said that Jalisi ignored repeated requests from House Speaker Busch and other top lawmakers to take anger management classes, which led to Busch withdrawing his use of state funds to pay his staffers. Jalisi denied the allegations, denouncing the investigation as a "nasty smear campaign and a sham investigation". On March 27, the House of Delegates voted unanimously to reprimand Jalisi. In December 2020, a District Court Judge ordered Jalisi to pay more than $19,500 in back pay and damages to a former legislative aide who did not receive payment for the month he worked for his office.

In October 2014, Jalisi was fined $2,500 for misusing campaign funds.

=== Unsafe living conditions in Jalisi-owned housing ===
In October 2014, the Maryland Department of the Environment fined Jalisi $15,000 for lead paint hazards related to at least two apartments in a Baltimore condominium.

In March 2021, a tenant filed a lawsuit against Jalisi's property management firm, HMJ Management Company, for failing to fix water leaks in her bathroom, causing her to slip on the wet floor and hit her head against the wall and a toilet paper stand. The toilet paper stand lodged in her throat and left her unable to call for help, requiring her to receive spinal surgery and leaving her with chronic neck and back pain that left her unable to work.

== Political positions ==
=== Crime ===
Jalisi introduced legislation in the 2016 legislative session that would limit strip-searches and shackling. The bill was amended to create a task force to investigate the Department of Juvenile Services' policies on strip-searching and shackling. The bill passed and became law on May 19, 2016.

=== Environment ===
In September 2017, the Maryland League of Conservation Voters gave Jalisi a score of 71 percent on its annual legislative scorecard, making him one of three Democrats not to receive a perfect score.

=== Marijuana ===
In February 2022, Jalisi declined to vote on legislation that created a framework for legalizing recreational marijuana. In April 2022, Jalisi again declined to vote to override a gubernatorial veto on the bill, citing religious reasons.

=== Social issues ===
In April 2021, Jalisi voted in favor of a bill that would create a constitutional ballot referendum that would require lawmakers to live in the districts they represent. The bill passed both chambers of the Maryland General Assembly and will be decided by voters in the 2022 elections.

Jalisi introduced legislation in the 2022 legislative session that would prevent car insurance companies from using a person's credit score in setting a policyholder's premium. The measure was unanimously rejected by the Economic Matters Committee in favor of identical legislation introduced by Delegate Melissa Wells.

== Electoral history ==
Maryland House of Delegates District 10 Democratic Primary Election, 2014
Party	Candidate	Votes	%
Democratic	Adrienne A. Jones	8,995	25.4%
Democratic	Jay Jalisi	6,146	17.4%
Democratic	Benjamin Brooks	5,507	15.6%
Democratic	Carin Smith	5,197	14.7%
Democratic	Robert "Rob" Johnson	3,369	9.5%
Democratic	Chris Blake	2,085	5.9%
Democratic	Michael Tyrone Brown, Sr.	1,868	5.3%
Democratic	Regg J. Hatcher, Jr.	1,121	3.2%
Democratic	Frederick Strickland	1,104	3.1%

Maryland House of Delegates District 10 General Election, 2014
Party	Candidate	Votes	%
Democratic	Adrienne A. Jones	24,104	29.6%
Democratic	Benjamin Brooks	23,703	29.1%
Democratic	Jay Jalisi	23,339	28.7%
Republican	William T. Newton	9,906	12.2%
N/A	Other Write-Ins	280	0.3%
Democratic (write-in)	Michael Tyrone Brown, Sr.	68	0.1%

Maryland House of Delegates District 10 Democratic Primary Election, 2018
Party	Candidate	Votes	%
Democratic	Adrienne A. Jones	11,005	28.4%
Democratic	Jay Jalisi	10,790	27.8%
Democratic	Benjamin Brooks	9,587	24.7%
Democratic	Lauren Lipscomb	4,588	11.8%
Democratic	Nathaniel M. Costley, Sr.	1,914	4.9%
Democratic	Jordan F. Porompyae	903	2.3%

Maryland House of Delegates District 10 General Election, 2018
Party	Candidate	Votes	%
Democratic	Adrienne A. Jones	33,830	27.4%
Democratic	Benjamin Brooks	33,066	26.8%
Democratic	Jay Jalisi	32,587	26.4%
Republican	George H. Harman	8,525	6.9%
Republican	Brian Marcos	7,706	6.2%
Republican	Matthew Kaliszak	7,458	6.0%
N/A	Other Write-Ins	159	0.1%

Democratic Primary, Congress, Special Election in Maryland 7th district, 2020
Party	Candidate	Votes	%
Democratic	Kweisi Mfume	31,415	43.0%
Democratic	Maya Rockeymoore Cummings	12,524	17.1%
Democratic	Jill P. Carter	11,708	16.0%
Democratic	Terri Hill	5,439	7.4%
Democratic	F. Michael Higginbotham	3,245	4.4%
Democratic	Harry Spikes	2,572	3.5%
Democratic	Saafir A. Rabb	1,327	1.8%
Democratic	Jay Jalisi	1,257	1.7%
Democratic	Talmadge Branch	810	1.1%
Democratic	Mark Steven Gosnell	579	0.8%
Democratic	T. Dan Baker	377	0.5%
Democratic	Charles Stokes	297	0.4%
Democratic	Paul V. Konka	251	0.3%
Democratic	Darryl Gonzalez	245	0.3%
Democratic	Alicia D. Brown	180	0.2%
Democratic	Leslie E. Grant	176	0.2%
Democratic	Anthony Carter, Sr.	155	0.2%
Democratic	Jay Fred Cohen	150	0.2%
Democratic	Matko Lee Chullin, III	79	0.1%
Democratic	Charles U. Smith	75	0.1%
Democratic	Adrian Petrus	60	0.1%
Democratic	Nathaniel M. Costley, Sr.	49	0.1%
Democratic	Jermyn Davidson	31	0.0%
Democratic	Dan Hiegel	31	0.0%

Democratic Primary, Congress, Maryland 7th district, 2020
Party	Candidate	Votes	%
Democratic	Kweisi Mfume	113,061	74.3%
Democratic	Maya Rockeymoore Cummings	15,208	10.0%
Democratic	Jill P. Carter	13,237	8.7%
Democratic	Alicia D. Brown	1,841	1.2%
Democratic	Charles Stokes	1,356	0.9%
Democratic	T. Dan Baker	1,141	0.7%
Democratic	Jay Jalisi	1,056	0.7%
Democratic	Harry Spikes	1,040	0.7%
Democratic	Saafir A. Rabb	948	0.6%
Democratic	Mark Steven Gosnell	765	0.5%
Democratic	Darryl Gonzalez	501	0.3%
Democratic	Jeff Woodard	368	0.2%
Democratic	Gary Schuman	344	0.2%
Democratic	Michael D. Howard, Jr.	327	0.2%
Democratic	Michael Davidson	298	0.2%
Democratic	Dan Hiegel	211	0.1%
Democratic	Charles U. Smith	189	0.1%
Democratic	Matko Lee Chullin, III	187	0.1%
Democratic	Adrian Petrus	170	0.1%
