= N. Scott Phillips =

American politician

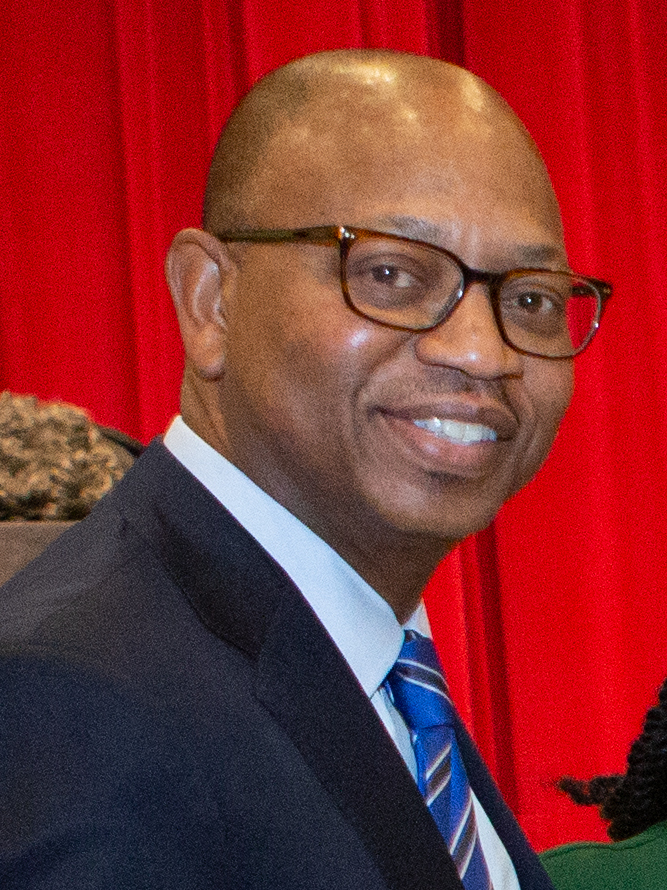

Member of the Maryland House of Delegates from the 10th district
- Incumbent
- Assumed office January 11, 2023 Serving with Adrienne A. Jones and Jennifer White Holland
- Preceded by: Jay Jalisi

Personal details
- Party: Democratic
- Spouse: Valarie
- Children: 2
- Education: Virginia Union University (BS); University of Maryland Francis King Carey School of Law (JD)
- Profession: Management consultant
- Website: Website

Norman Scott Phillips is an American politician, attorney, and management consultant who is a member of the Maryland House of Delegates for District 10 in Baltimore County, Maryland.

== Career ==
Phillips attended Virginia Union University, where he was valedictorian of his class and earned a bachelor's degree in accounting in 1983, and the University of Maryland School of Law, where he earned his Juris Doctor degree in 1989. After graduating, Phillips worked as a minority business program manager at IBM, eventually becoming the director of its federal small business program. Before becoming a member of the Maryland House of Delegates, he worked as the Director of the Minority Business Development Agency Business Center in Baltimore, Maryland.

Phillips first became involved with politics in 2002, when he ran for the Maryland House of Delegates in District 10. He ran on a ticket with state senator Delores G. Kelley and state delegates Adrienne A. Jones and Shirley Nathan-Pulliam, but failed to advance out of the primary, coming in fourth with 17.3 percent of the vote.

In October 2012, Baltimore County executive Kevin Kamenetz named Phillips to serve as the chairman of the Baltimore County Planning Board.

In 2022, he again ran for the Maryland House of Delegates on a slate with Speaker of the Maryland House of Delegates Adrienne Jones, then-state delegate Benjamin Brooks, and nonprofit executive Jennifer White. He won the Democratic primary on July 19, receiving 11.8 percent of the vote.

== In the legislature ==
Scott was sworn into the Maryland House of Delegates on January 11, 2023. He is a member of the House Judiciary Committee.

In January 2026, Scott was elected as the chair of the Legislative Black Caucus of Maryland. During his chairmanship, the caucus supported bills to prohibit counties from entering into 287(g) program agreements with U.S. Immigration and Customs Enforcement, investigate a property in Prince George's County that may hold unmarked graves of youth from the former House of Reformation and Instruction of Colored Children, and reform policies that automatically charge minors as adults for certain crimes.

== Political positions ==
=== Crime and policing ===
During the 2026 legislative session, Phillips supported a bill to end the practice of automatically charging minors as adults for certain crimes.

=== Immigration ===
During the 2026 legislative session, Phillips introduced the Community Trust Act, which would prohibit local law enforcement agencies and jails from detaining any individuals based on immigration status and responding to requests from U.S. Immigration and Customs Enforcement. He also supported legislation banning counties form entering into 287(g) program agreements with ICE, saying that he didn't want Maryland redirecting local law enforcement resources to a federal agency that already has more than $80 billion in funding.

== Personal life ==
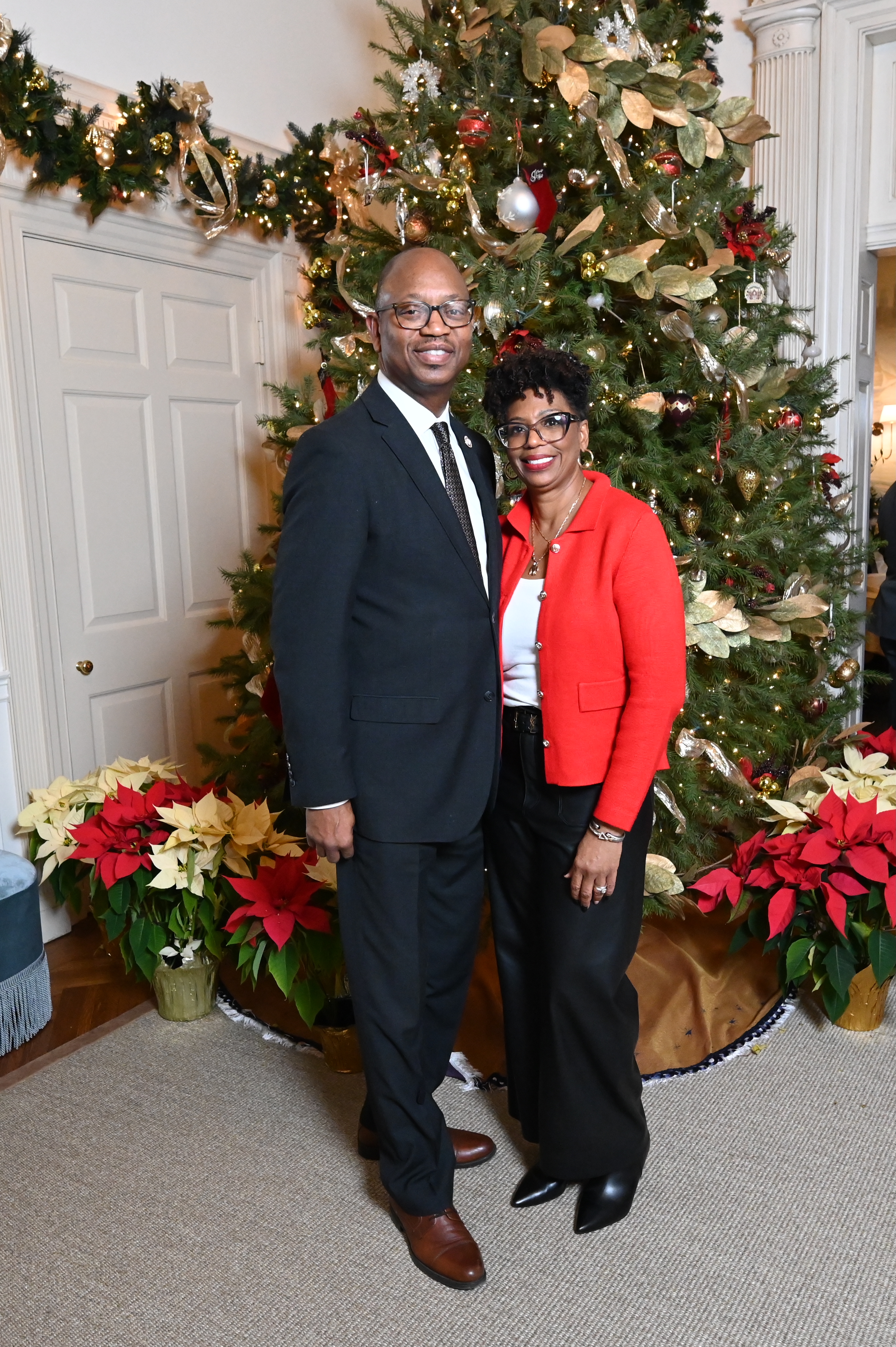
Scott and his wife Valarie at a Government House holiday reception, 2024

Scott is married to his wife of over 30 years, Valarie. Together, they have two daughters, Erin and Kaylyn.

== Electoral history ==
Maryland House of Delegates District 10 Democratic primary election, 2002
Party	Candidate	Votes	%
Democratic	Shirley Nathan-Pulliam	10,800	28.6
Democratic	Emmett C. Burns Jr.	9,360	24.8
Democratic	Adrienne A. Jones	8,763	23.2
Democratic	N. Scott Phillips	6,521	17.3
Democratic	Barry N. Chapman	2,268	6.0

Maryland House of Delegates District 10 Democratic primary election, 2022
Party	Candidate	Votes	%
Democratic	Adrienne A. Jones	12,591	28.7
Democratic	Jennifer White	8,410	19.2
Democratic	N. Scott Philips	5,161	11.8
Democratic	Ruben Amaya	4,249	9.7
Democratic	Michael T. Brown, Sr.	4,085	9.3
Democratic	Korey T. Johnson	3,823	8.7
Democratic	Regg J. Hatcher, Jr.	2,347	5.4
Democratic	Nathaniel Logan	1,601	3.7
Democratic	Nathaniel Maurice Costley, Sr.	970	2.2
Democratic	Garland M. Jarratt Sanderson	612	1.4

Maryland House of Delegates District 10 election, 2022
Party	Candidate	Votes	%
Democratic	Adrienne A. Jones	29,842	29.42
Democratic	Jennifer White	27,925	27.53
Democratic	N. Scott Phillips	26,643	26.27
Republican	Patricia R. Fallon	9,024	8.90
Republican	Jordan Porompyae	7,685	7.58
Write-in		304	0.30
