= Adrienne A. Jones =

American politician (born 1954)

Adrienne Jones
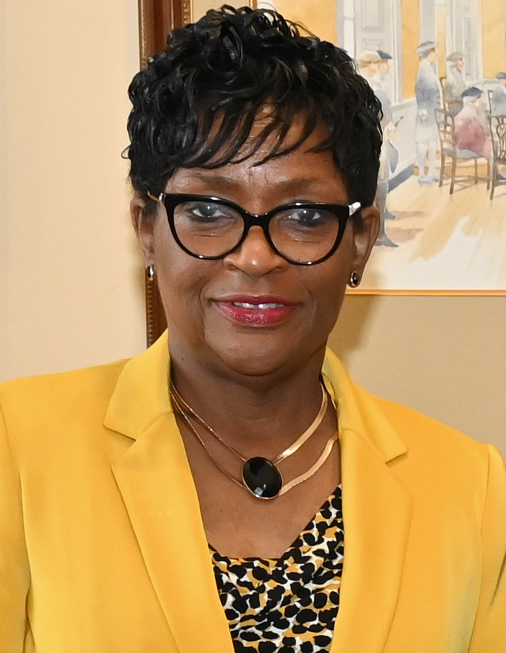

107th Speaker of the Maryland House of Delegates
- In office April 7, 2019 – December 4, 2025; Acting: April 7, 2019 – May 1, 2019
- Preceded by: Michael E. Busch
- Succeeded by: Dana Stein (acting)

Speaker pro tempore of the Maryland House of Delegates
- In office January 8, 2003 – May 1, 2019
- Preceded by: Thomas E. Dewberry
- Succeeded by: Sheree Sample-Hughes

Member of the Maryland House of Delegates from the 10th district
- Incumbent
- Assumed office October 21, 1997 Serving with N. Scott Phillips and Jennifer White Holland
- Appointed by: Parris Glendening
- Preceded by: Joan Parker

Personal details
- Born: November 20, 1954 (age 71) Cowdensville, Maryland, U.S.
- Party: Democratic
- Children: 2 (Note: One child is deceased.)
- Education: University of Maryland, Baltimore County (BA)
- Jones's voice Jones gives remarks during Congressman Steny Hoyer's 40th Annual Black History Month Celebration; Recorded February 27, 2021

Adrienne Alease Jones (born November 20, 1954) is an American politician who has served as a member of the Maryland House of Delegates from the 10th district since 1997. A member of the Democratic Party, she served as the 107th Speaker of the Maryland House of Delegates from 2019 to 2025, becoming the first African-American and first woman to serve in that position in Maryland.

Born and raised in Baltimore County, Jones graduated from the University of Maryland, Baltimore County before working in Baltimore County government until 2014. Following the death of state delegate Joan N. Parker, she was appointed to the Maryland House of Delegates in 1997, and was subsequently elected to her first four-year term in 1998. She was named speaker pro tempore by House Speaker Michael E. Busch in 2003, serving in this position until her election as Speaker following Busch's death in 2019. During her speakership, Jones supported the implementation of the Blueprint for Maryland's Future as well as efforts to enshrine abortion rights into the Constitution of Maryland and ensure equity in Maryland's newly-created recreational cannabis and sports betting industries. She stepped down as speaker in December 2025, and withdrew from her re-election bid in February 2026.

== Early life and education ==
Born in the historically African-American community of Cowdensville in Arbutus, Maryland, Jones was the second of five children. She attended Baltimore County public schools and graduated from Lansdowne High School, and later attended the University of Maryland, Baltimore County, where she earned a B.A. degree in psychology in 1976.

== Career ==
=== Early career ===
After graduating, Jones worked as a clerk in the Baltimore County's Office of Central Services. She first became involved in politics in 1979, when started working as a legislative officer for Baltimore County Executive Donald P. Hutchinson. In 1987, Jones became a member of Woman Power, Inc., a voter education organization. From 1989 to 1995, she worked as the director of the Office of Minority Affairs in Baltimore County, Maryland, afterwards working as the executive director of the Office of Fair Practices and Community Affairs until 2011. Jones later worked as the deputy director of the Office of Human Resources until 2014. She also founded the Baltimore County African American Cultural Festival.

=== Maryland House of Delegates ===
Jones was a member of the Baltimore County Democratic Central Committee and applied to fill a vacancy in the Maryland House of Delegates following the death of then-state delegate Joan N. Parker in 1997. Her candidacy was backed by several local area politicians, including Baltimore County Executive Dutch Ruppersberger, state senators Delores G. Kelley and Shirley Nathan-Pulliam, and state delegate Emmett C. Burns Jr. The Baltimore County Democratic Central Committee voted to nominate her out of a field of 16 candidates. Her nomination was confirmed by Governor Parris Glendening, and she was sworn in on October 21, 1997.

Jones was a member of the Appropriations Committee from 1997 to 2003, afterwards serving on the Ways and Means Committee for part of the 2003 legislative session before rejoining the Appropriations Committee, where she remained until her election as Speaker in 2019. She returned to the Appropriations Committee in 2026, after stepping down as speaker. She also served as the chair of the Capital Budget Subcommittee from 2003 to 2019, which allowed her to get to know delegates from across the state and the projects they wanted built in their districts. From 2003 to 2019, Jones served as the speaker pro tempore of the Maryland House of Delegates, the first African-American woman to serve in this position. In this capacity, she filled in for House Speaker Michael E. Busch when he was absent and worked to quash personal issues with delegates before they became problems.

In December 2008, following an unexpected drop in state revenues, Governor Martin O'Malley ordered a furlough for state employees. Jones voluntarily participated in the state employee furlough later that month. The constitutionality of doing this was unclear, as the Constitution of Maryland prohibits the state government from furloughing state legislators.

In May 2020, Jones was named co-chair of the Maryland Women for Biden group, alongside Prince George's County Executive Angela Alsobrooks, State Senate President Pro Tem Melony G. Griffith, and Maryland Democratic Party Chair Yvette Lewis. In January 2021, she condemned the January 6 United States Capitol attack, calling it "nothing less than sedition". Jones was an at-large delegate to the 2024 Democratic National Convention, pledged to Kamala Harris.

Jones missed most of the 2026 legislative session, having only attended a handful of days during the 90 day session. A spokesperson for House Speaker Joseline Peña-Melnyk told Maryland Matters that Jones was out with an undisclosed medical condition and it was not known if or when she might return. In February 2026, Jones withdrew as a candidate in the 2026 election.

=== Speaker of the House of Delegates ===
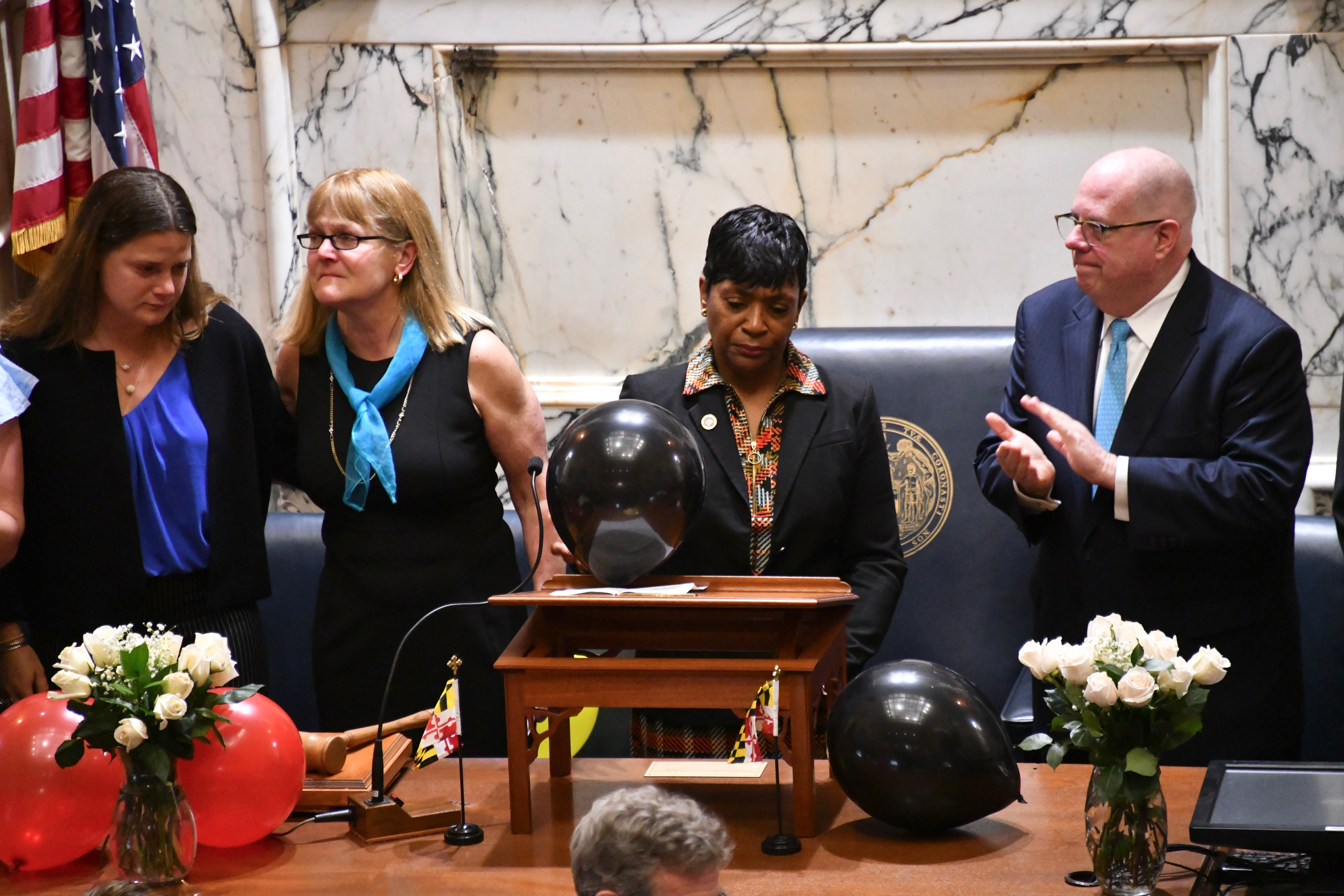
Jones serving as Speaker of the Maryland House of Delegates, April 2019

Jones took over as Acting Speaker of the Maryland House of Delegates on April 7, 2019, following the death of then-Speaker Michael E. Busch. A few days later, following Busch's funeral, she announced that she would run for Speaker, becoming the first candidate to declare an intention to run. She withdrew her candidacy later that month after failing to secure enough support, and endorsed state delegate Dereck E. Davis.

In a special session on May 1, the House of Delegates unanimously elected Jones as Speaker of the House by a vote of 139–0, following a stalemate between delegates Maggie McIntosh and Davis, the remaining two candidates for speaker, that ended in both bowing out of the Speaker's race in favor of Jones. Jones is both the first female and first African-American speaker in Maryland state history, and only the third Black woman to serve as state House speaker overall following Karen Bass of California and Sheila Oliver of New Jersey. In September 2019, she selected state delegate Sheree Sample-Hughes to succeed her as speaker pro tempore.

During her tenure as Speaker, Jones supported the implementation of the Blueprint for Maryland's Future and a number of social justice issues, including increased funding for historically underfunded historically Black colleges and universities (HBCUs), police reform, and ensuring equity licenses in the state's recreational cannabis and sports betting industries. She also supported efforts to enshrine the right to an abortion into the Constitution of Maryland, an effort previously shepherded by her predecessor. In April 2022, Jones signed 103 Maryland measures into law together with Republican Governor Larry Hogan and Maryland Senate president pro tempore Melony G. Griffith, marking the first time that two Black women had taken part in such a ceremony as Maryland's presiding officers.

On December 4, 2025, Jones announced that she would step down as speaker of the Maryland House of Delegates, effective immediately.

== Political positions ==
=== Abortion ===
In May 2019, after the Alabama General Assembly passed the Human Life Protection Act, Jones said she would continue Busch's efforts to codify abortion rights in the Constitution of Maryland. During the 2022 legislative session, she introduced legislation that would create a ballot referendum on codifying the right to abortion access into the state constitution. The bill passed the House of Delegates, but died in the Maryland Senate after Senate President Bill Ferguson declined to put the bill up for a vote. In June 2022, after the U.S. Supreme Court overturned Roe v. Wade in Dobbs v. Jackson Women's Health Organization, Jones promised to reintroduce the abortion referendum bill during the 2023 legislative session, during which it passed and was signed into law by Governor Wes Moore.

=== COVID-19 pandemic ===
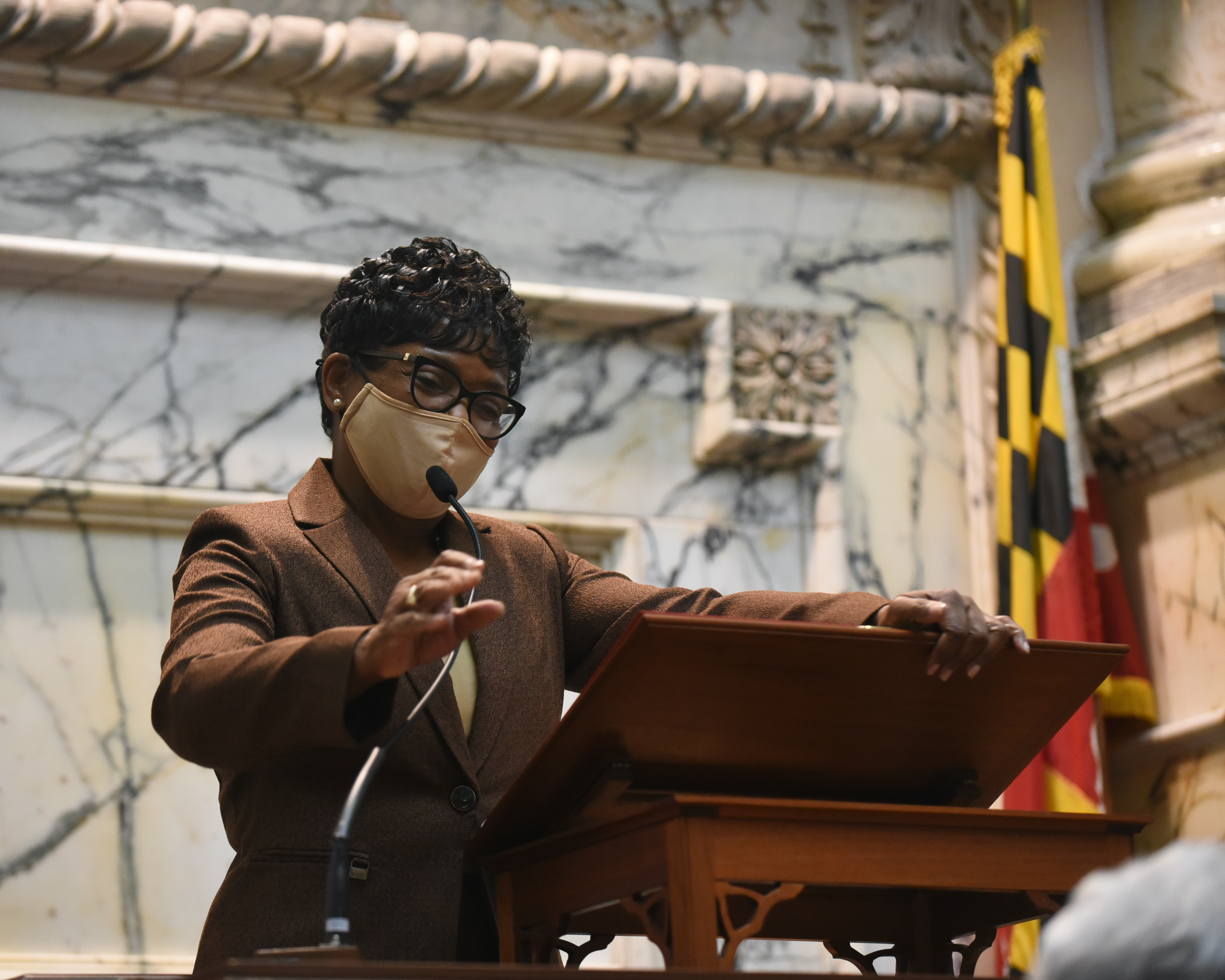
Jones presiding over the Maryland House of Delegates during the COVID-19 pandemic.

On March 12, 2020, a week after Governor Larry Hogan declared a state of emergency for the COVID-19 pandemic in Maryland, Jones told legislators to prioritize work on "the most critical bills" in case they needed to end the legislative session early for the pandemic. Three days later, she announced that the Maryland General Assembly would adjourn sine die on March 18, but would reconvene for a special legislative session in May, which never happened. The early adjournment marked the first time the Maryland General Assembly had ended its legislative session early since the American Civil War. She confirmed the first case of COVID-19 in the Maryland General Assembly on March 22.

Ahead of the legislature's adjournment, Jones introduced legislation to extend temporary unemployment benefits for workers affected by the pandemic, which passed and was signed into law by Governor Larry Hogan. On March 19, she convened the COVID-19 Response Legislative Workgroup to monitor the state's response to the pandemic. Jones criticized the lack of transparency from the Hogan administration during the pandemic, especially from the Maryland Department of Health, saying that the administration ignored coronavirus-related health questions as the governor began lifting pandemic-related restrictions. In May 2020, she questioned the Hogan administration's decision to begin reopening the state, requesting data to justify the decision.

In March 2020, Jones wrote a letter to Governor Hogan calling on him to provide some in-person voting opportunities for the 2020 primary and general elections, arguing that using only mail-in ballots in these elections would disenfranchise voters with disabilities or with limited access to postal services. She later appeared in an ad to encourage voters to promote voting by mail in the 2020 Maryland's 7th congressional district special election. In May 2020, Jones wrote to the Maryland State Board of Elections to increase the state's voting centers and mail-in ballot drop-off locations in Montgomery County and Baltimore. In July 2020, after Governor Hogan announced plans to hold a full in-person election for the 2020 general election, Jones encouraged voters to register for a mail-in ballot online and sent a letter to Hogan demanding that he provide voters with prepaid postage for ballot applications.

In May 2020, Jones co-signed a letter to congressional leaders requesting "additional, flexible funding" for state and local governments amid budget deficiencies in response to the pandemic. In June 2020, she informed state Budget Secretary David R. Brinkley that the legislature would cut $4.8 million, or about five percent of its annual budget, from its 2020 budget. In August 2020, Jones called on Hogan to allocate funding toward lawyers to help tenants at risk of being evicted during the pandemic.

Jones declined to hold a special legislative session to pass legislation to address housing and policing issues amid the pandemic, saying that these issues would be dealt with during the 2021 legislative session. In November 2020, she issued restrictions on meetings in the House of Delegates ahead of the 2021 legislative session, including capacity restrictions on legislator offices and a ban on meetings with lobbyists.

During the 2021 legislative session, Jones introduced legislation to reform the state's unemployment insurance program, which passed and signed into law by Governor Hogan, and another that would extend the state's earned income tax credit to Individual Taxpayer Identification Number taxpayers. In July 2021, she called for the resignation of state Labor Secretary Tiffany Robinson, citing her slow adoption of the unemployment reforms and poor communications with claimants.

In May 2021, Jones announced that the Maryland State House would reopen to visitors and tourists.

In August 2021, Jones urged Hogan to extend the state's emergency declaration amid a rise in cases from the delta variant. She later expressed support of a Maryland State Board of Education policy mandating universal masking in public schools and called on Hogan to implement the policy immediately.

=== Education ===
During the 2004 legislative session, Jones introduced a bill to cap tuition increases at state universities to five percent a year, but only if the state increased its spending on higher education by five percent a year over the next three years. The bill passed, but was vetoed by Governor Bob Ehrlich.

During the 2016 legislative session, Jones introduced legislation to give lawmakers oversight over Governor Larry Hogan's appointments to the Baltimore County Board of Education. The bill failed to pass out of the Baltimore County Delegation. She also supported a bill that removed the state's ability to spend tax money on portable air conditioners in schools, and the College Affordability Act, which would match contributions made by low-income families toward college savings accounts.

During the 2018 legislative session, Jones introduced legislation to strip the Maryland Board of Public Works of its oversight and management of the state's annual "beg-a-thon", in which school system leaders appear before the board to request additional school construction funding. The bill passed and was vetoed by Governor Larry Hogan, which was later overridden by the Maryland General Assembly.

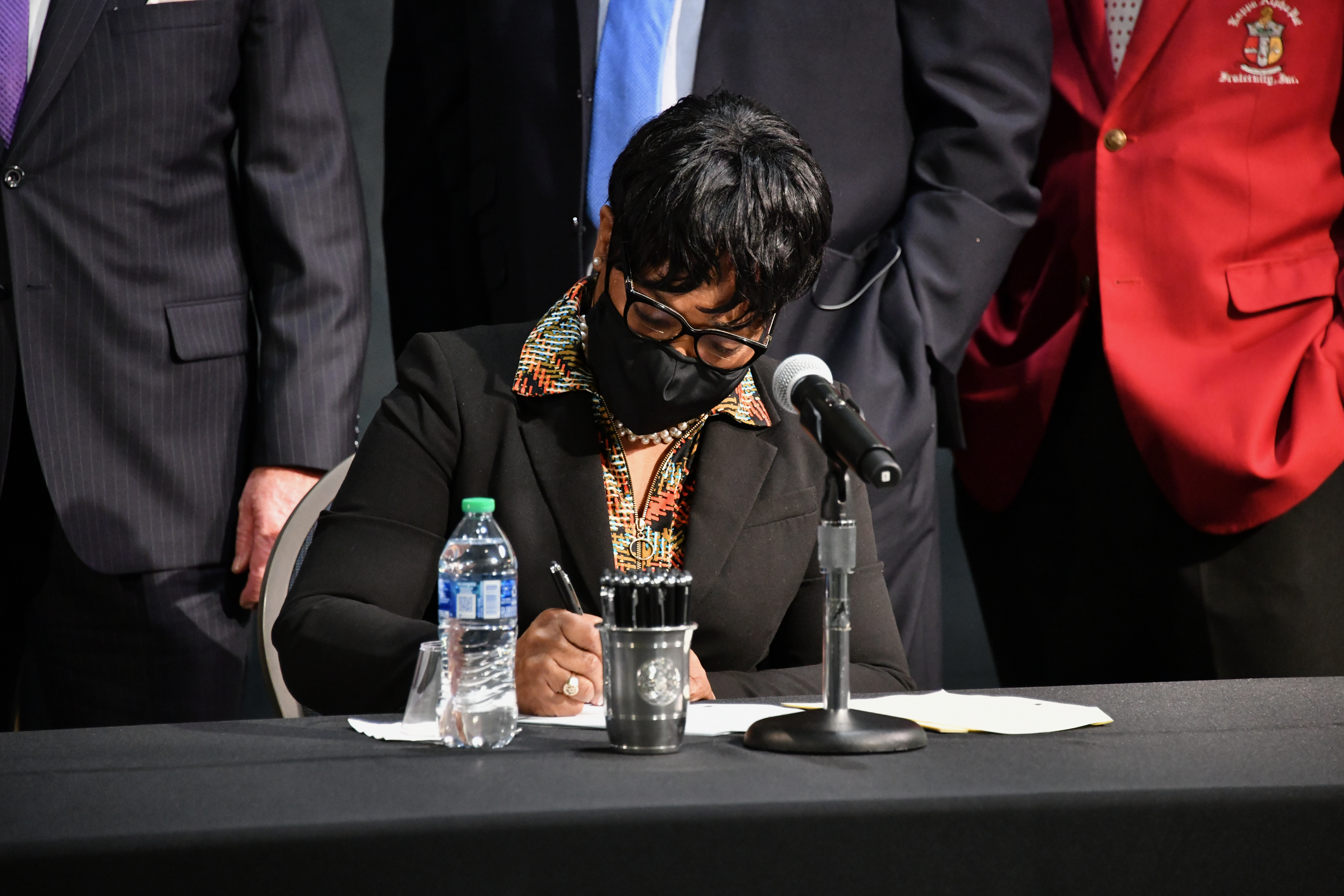
Jones signs the HBCU lawsuit settlement bill into law, 2021

In October 2019, Jones sent a letter to Governor Hogan urging him to accept the amount recommended by an attorney representing the state's historically black colleges and universities (HBCUs) in a 13-year-old lawsuit against the state over funding disparities. During the 2020 legislative session, she introduced and testified in support of legislation that would force the state to settle the lawsuit by annually distributing $57.7 million to the state's HBCUs over a decade. The bill passed, but was vetoed by Governor Hogan. The bill was reintroduced during the 2021 legislative session, during which it unanimously passed and was signed into law by Governor Hogan.

During the 2019 legislative session, Jones supported legislation to increase state education spending by $850 million as part of the implementation of the Blueprint for Maryland's Future. The bill became law without Governor Hogan's signature. In July 2019, Jones said she would support legislation to fully implement the Blueprint and to fund new school construction. During the 2020 legislative session, she introduced the Built to Learn Act, which would allow the Maryland Stadium Authority to issue up to $2.2 billion in bonds to pay for school construction projects, and the Blueprint implementation bill. Both bills passed, but Hogan vetoed the Blueprint bill while signing the Built to Learn Act into law, which was amended to become dependent on the Blueprint bill passing to go into effect. The Maryland General Assembly overrode Hogan's veto of the Blueprint for Maryland's Future during the 2021 legislative session. Jones, to account for the impact Hogan's veto would have on the Blueprint's implementation, introduced a bill to adjust the bill's implementation timeline, which passed and became law without Hogan's signature.

During the 2023 legislative session, Jones introduced the SERVE Act, which created a "service year option" in schools that would pay high school graduates $15 per hour for at least 30 hours a week for work in service to the community. The bill passed and was signed into law by Governor Wes Moore.

=== Environment ===
In August 2021, Jones said she supported the construction of a wind farm off the shore of Ocean City, Maryland, calling it "one of the state's most impactful and innovative renewable energy projects".

=== Gun control ===
In 2013, Jones voted in favor of the Firearm Safety Act of 2013, a bill that placed restrictions on firearm purchases and magazine capacity in semi-automatic rifles. In November 2023, she expressed disappointment with a Fourth Circuit Court of Appeals ruling that struck down a provision of the Firearm Safety Act that required handgun owners to obtain a "handgun qualification license" to buy a handgun.

During the 2020 legislative session, Jones spoke in support of a bill to restrict the transfer of rifles or shotguns to people prohibited from owning handguns. The bill passed, but was vetoed by Governor Larry Hogan.

During the 2022 legislative session, Jones introduced legislation that would require gun shops to have increased safety measures, including 24-hour burglary alarm systems and anti-vehicle barriers. The bills passed, but were vetoed by Governor Hogan; the legislature overrode his veto the following day.

=== Justice and policing ===
In 2013, Jones voted in favor of legislation to repeal the death penalty in Maryland.

In May 2020, following the murder of George Floyd, Jones announced the formation of a bipartisan work group to review police reform and accountability in the state. In June 2020, she wrote a letter to Governor Larry Hogan calling on him to enact executive orders to immediately reform the state's police use of force policies.

The work group released its recommendations in October, which included repealing the state's Law Enforcement Officers' Bill of Rights and regulating the types of force that police could use during arrests. During the 2021 legislative session, Jones introduced the Police Reform and Accountability Act, which implemented the work group's recommendations. It was passed and vetoed by Governor Larry Hogan; the Maryland General Assembly voted to override Hogan's veto the following day.

In June 2021, following the release of a viral video showing Ocean City police officers exerting force against a group of Black teenagers on the boardwalk, Jones released a statement calling the incident "deeply disturbing" and calling for Ocean City officials to review the incident and dismiss the charges that led to the arrest.

=== Marijuana ===
During the 2014 legislative session, Jones introduced legislation to create diversion programs for first-time marijuana offenders.

In July 2021, Jones said she supported a ballot referendum to legalize recreational marijuana in Maryland. During the 2022 legislative session, she introduced legislation creating the referendum, which passed and was overwhelmingly approved by voters in the 2022 general election.

=== Redistricting ===
In June 2019, Jones expressed disappointment with the U.S. Supreme Court's ruling in Benisek v. Lamone, saying that she hoped the court would offer a "national solution to what is clearly a national problem".

During the 2021 legislative session, Jones supported legislation that would require elections for county commissioners to only be decided by voters within the districts in which the candidate is running, calling it a "historic civil rights legislation".

In July 2021, Jones announced the formation of the Legislative Redistricting Advisory Commission, which was tasked with coming up with new congressional and legislative maps to pass during the 2020 redistricting cycle. The LRAC proposed four draft maps for the state's new congressional districts in November, two of which would have likely strengthened Democrats' chances of defeating Representative Andy Harris, the state's lone congressional Republican, in Maryland's 1st congressional district. Democratic leaders of the Maryland General Assembly voted to consider the first of these two maps, which passed, but was vetoed by Governor Larry Hogan; the Maryland General Assembly voted to override Hogan's veto the same day.

The maps were struck down by Judge Lynne A. Battaglia, who ruled that the maps were "a product of extreme partisan gerrymandering", a ruling that Jones expressed disappointment with. Jones introduced replacement maps shortly after the ruling, which proposed a map that undid changes to the 1st district. The new redistricting plan passed and was signed into law by Hogan.

In October 2025, amid Republican efforts to redraw congressional maps in Texas and Missouri to gain Republican seats in the 2026 United States House of Representatives elections, Jones said she was "eager and willing" to consider redrawing Maryland's congressional lines to counter mid-decade redistricting efforts.

=== Social issues ===
In 2005, Jones was one of 36 Democratic state delegates to vote against a bill to legalize slot machines in Maryland.

During the 2012 legislative session, Jones introduced legislation to limit retirement bonuses for select county workers.

In 2012, Jones voted in favor of the Civil Marriage Protection Act, which legalized same sex marriage in Maryland. In December 2019, Jones announced the implementation of various physical and logistical changes to the Maryland House of Delegates, including conversion of bathrooms behind the House chamber to include a gender-neutral bathroom.

In May 2019, in one of her first actions as Speaker, Jones called for the removal of a plaque dedicated to Union and Confederate soldiers who fought in the American Civil War. The State House Trust voted in June 2020 to remove the plaque. Following its removal, Jones called for the repeal of "Maryland, My Maryland" as the official state anthem. She supported legislation to repeal the state song during the 2021 legislative session, which was signed into law by Governor Larry Hogan.

During the 2020 legislative session, Jones supported legislation to provide $375.5 million toward modernizing Pimlico Race Course and Laurel Park. The bill passed and became law without Governor Hogan's signature.

In January 2020, following the sentencing of former state delegate Tawanna P. Gaines for misusing campaign funds for personal benefit, Jones said she would introduce legislation to ban family members from serving as campaign treasurers.

During the 2021 legislative session, Jones unveiled her "Black Agenda", which included a package of bills to increase equity in business and reduce barriers to financial resources. She also introduced legislation to establish the framework for the sports betting industry following Maryland voters approving a ballot referendum to legalize sports betting during the 2020 general election. These bills all passed and were signed into law by Governor Hogan. In February 2021, Jones announced that she would require criminal justice bills to include racial impact statements in their legislative analysis.

In August 2022, Jones said she supported bringing the new Federal Bureau of Investigation headquarters to Prince George's County, writing to General Services Administration administrator Robin Carnahan that locating it there would help the federal government meet its equity goals.

In June 2025, Jones opposed the U.S. Supreme Court's rulings in Mahmoud v. Taylor and Trump v. CASA.

=== Taxes ===
In 2006, Jones voted to override Governor Bob Ehrlich's veto of a bill capping electricity bill rate increases at 15 percent.

In 2013, Jones voted in favor of legislation to index the state's gas taxes to inflation to pay for transportation projects.

In July 2019, Jones proposed cutting the state's tax credits to pay for the Blueprint for Maryland's Future. During the 2020 legislative session, she ruled out increasing state sales, property, or income taxes to pay for education reforms.

During the 2022 legislative session, Jones introduced a package of bills to eliminate state taxes on the sales of child care and medical items, and another bill creating a 30-day gas tax holiday following a spike in gas prices as the result of the Russo-Ukrainian War. All of these bills passed unanimously and were signed into law by Governor Larry Hogan. In May 2022, Jones declined to hold a special legislative session to prevent the state's gas tax from increasing 7 cents per gallon to adjust for inflation, and blamed big oil companies for "exploiting global uncertainty" to significantly increase gas prices. She also declined to extend the state's gas tax holiday, which she said would have "long-term consequences" on the state's infrastructure.

=== Transportation ===
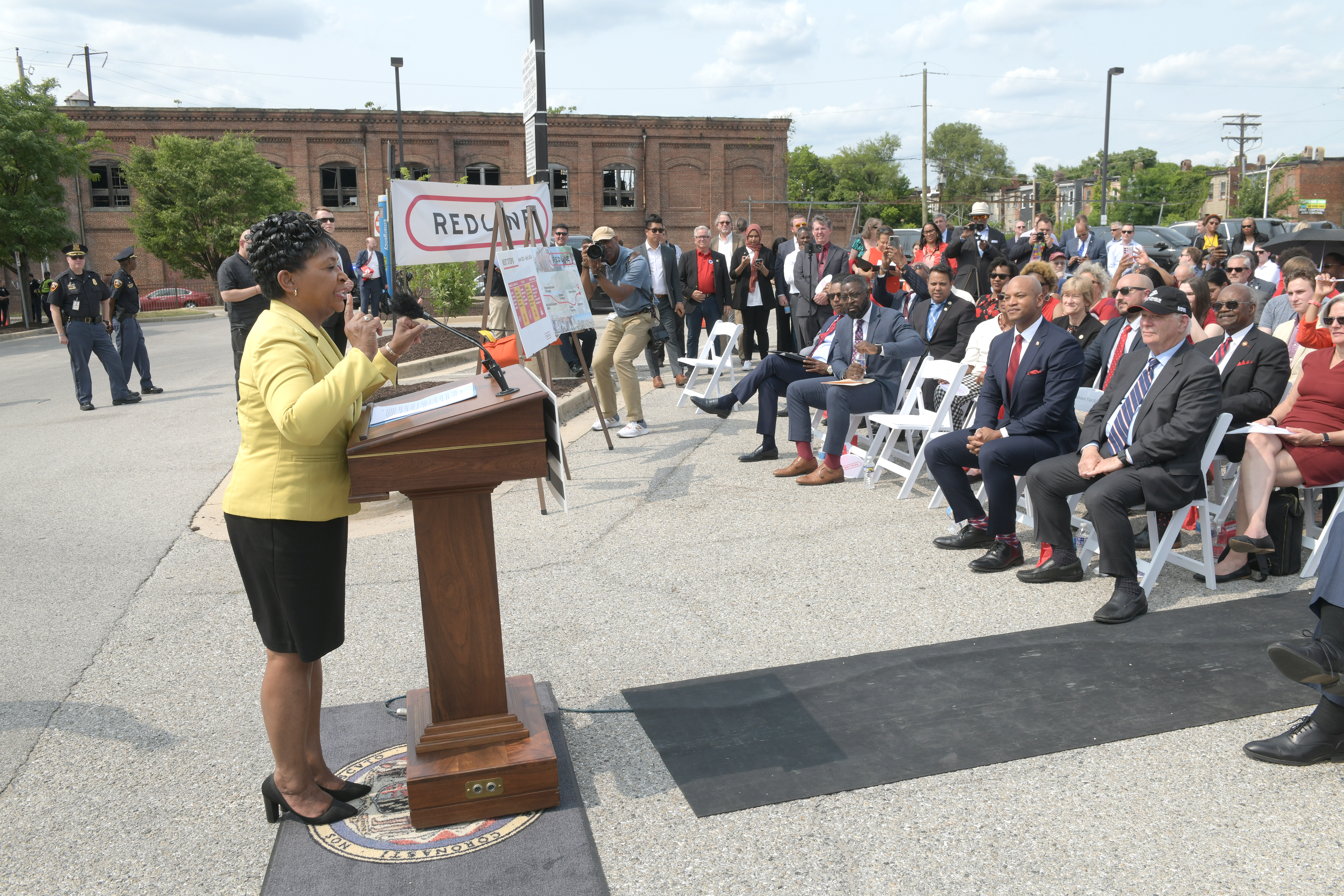
Jones speaks at the Red Line revival press conference, 2023

Jones supported the construction of the Red Line and criticized Governor Larry Hogan's cancellation of the transit project, which she said would have been "an economic engine for the area". After Governor Wes Moore announced the revival of the Red Line in 2023, Jones supported a study to explore extending the transit line to Sparrows Point, Maryland.

== Personal life ==
Jones lives in Woodstock, Maryland. She has two sons and attends religious services at the Union Bethel African Methodist Episcopal Church in Randallstown, Maryland.

== Electoral history ==
Maryland House of Delegates District 10 Democratic primary election, 1998
| Party | Candidate | Votes | % |
|---|---|---|---|
| Democratic | Emmett C. Burns (incumbent) | 7,925 | 28.5 |
| Democratic | Shirley Nathan-Pulliam (incumbent) | 7,634 | 27.4 |
| Democratic | Adrienne A. Jones (incumbent) | 5,609 | 20.1 |
| Democratic | Ronald N. Flamer | 3,899 | 14.0 |
| Democratic | Barry Chapman | 1,188 | 4.3 |
| Democratic | Eric W. Thomas | 860 | 3.1 |
| Democratic | Edwin Potillo | 494 | 1.8 |
| Democratic | Alexander Assefa Getachew | 234 | 0.8 |

Maryland House of Delegates District 10 election, 1998
| Party | Candidate | Votes | % |
|---|---|---|---|
| Democratic | Emmett C. Burns (incumbent) | 23,203 | 35.6 |
| Democratic | Shirley Nathan-Pulliam (incumbent) | 21,348 | 32.7 |
| Democratic | Adrienne A. Jones (incumbent) | 20,676 | 31.7 |

Maryland House of Delegates District 10 election, 2002
| Party | Candidate | Votes | % |
|---|---|---|---|
| Democratic | Emmett C. Burns (incumbent) | 27,921 | 31.5 |
| Democratic | Shirley Nathan-Pulliam (incumbent) | 26,269 | 29.7 |
| Democratic | Adrienne A. Jones (incumbent) | 25,655 | 29.0 |
| Republican | Steven D'Arezzo | 8,480 | 9.6 |
| Write-in | | 254 | 0.3 |

Maryland House of Delegates District 10 election, 2006
| Party | Candidate | Votes | % |
|---|---|---|---|
| Democratic | Emmett C. Burns (incumbent) | 29,140 | 34.2 |
| Democratic | Shirley Nathan-Pulliam (incumbent) | 28,544 | 33.5 |
| Democratic | Adrienne A. Jones (incumbent) | 27,064 | 31.8 |
| Write-in | | 370 | 0.4 |

Maryland House of Delegates District 10 election, 2010
| Party | Candidate | Votes | % |
|---|---|---|---|
| Democratic | Emmett C. Burns (incumbent) | 31,513 | 31.6 |
| Democratic | Shirley Nathan-Pulliam (incumbent) | 31,399 | 31.5 |
| Democratic | Adrienne A. Jones (incumbent) | 29,719 | 29.8 |
| Republican | Jeanne L. Turnock | 6,837 | 6.9 |
| Write-in | | 332 | 0.3 |

Maryland House of Delegates District 10 election, 2014
| Party | Candidate | Votes | % |
|---|---|---|---|
| Democratic | Adrienne A. Jones (incumbent) | 24,104 | 29.6 |
| Democratic | Benjamin Brooks | 23,703 | 29.1 |
| Democratic | Jay Jalisi | 23,339 | 28.7 |
| Republican | William T. Newton | 9,906 | 12.2 |
| Write-in | | 348 | 0.4 |

Maryland House of Delegates District 10 election, 2018
| Party | Candidate | Votes | % |
|---|---|---|---|
| Democratic | Adrienne A. Jones (incumbent) | 33,830 | 27.4 |
| Democratic | Benjamin Brooks (incumbent) | 33,066 | 26.8 |
| Democratic | Jay Jalisi (incumbent) | 32,587 | 26.4 |
| Republican | George H. Harman | 8,525 | 6.9 |
| Republican | Brian Marcos | 7,706 | 6.2 |
| Republican | Matthew Kaliszak | 7,458 | 6.0 |
| Write-in | | 159 | 0.1 |

Maryland House of Delegates District 10 election, 2022
| Party | Candidate | Votes | % |
|---|---|---|---|
| Democratic | Adrienne A. Jones (incumbent) | 29,842 | 29.4 |
| Democratic | Jennifer White | 27,925 | 27.5 |
| Democratic | N. Scott Phillips | 26,643 | 26.3 |
| Republican | Patricia R. Fallon | 9,024 | 8.9 |
| Republican | Jordan Porompyae | 7,685 | 7.6 |
| Write-in | | 304 | 0.3 |

== See also ==
- List of speakers of the Maryland House of Delegates

== Notes ==
Maryland House of Delegates
| Preceded by Thomas E. Dewberry | Speaker pro tempore of the Maryland House of Delegates; 2003–2019 | Succeeded by Sheree Sample-Hughes |
Political offices
| Preceded by Michael E. Busch | Speaker of the Maryland House of Delegates; 2019–2025 | Succeeded by Dana Stein; Acting |
