= Benjamin Brooks (politician) =

American politician (born 1950)

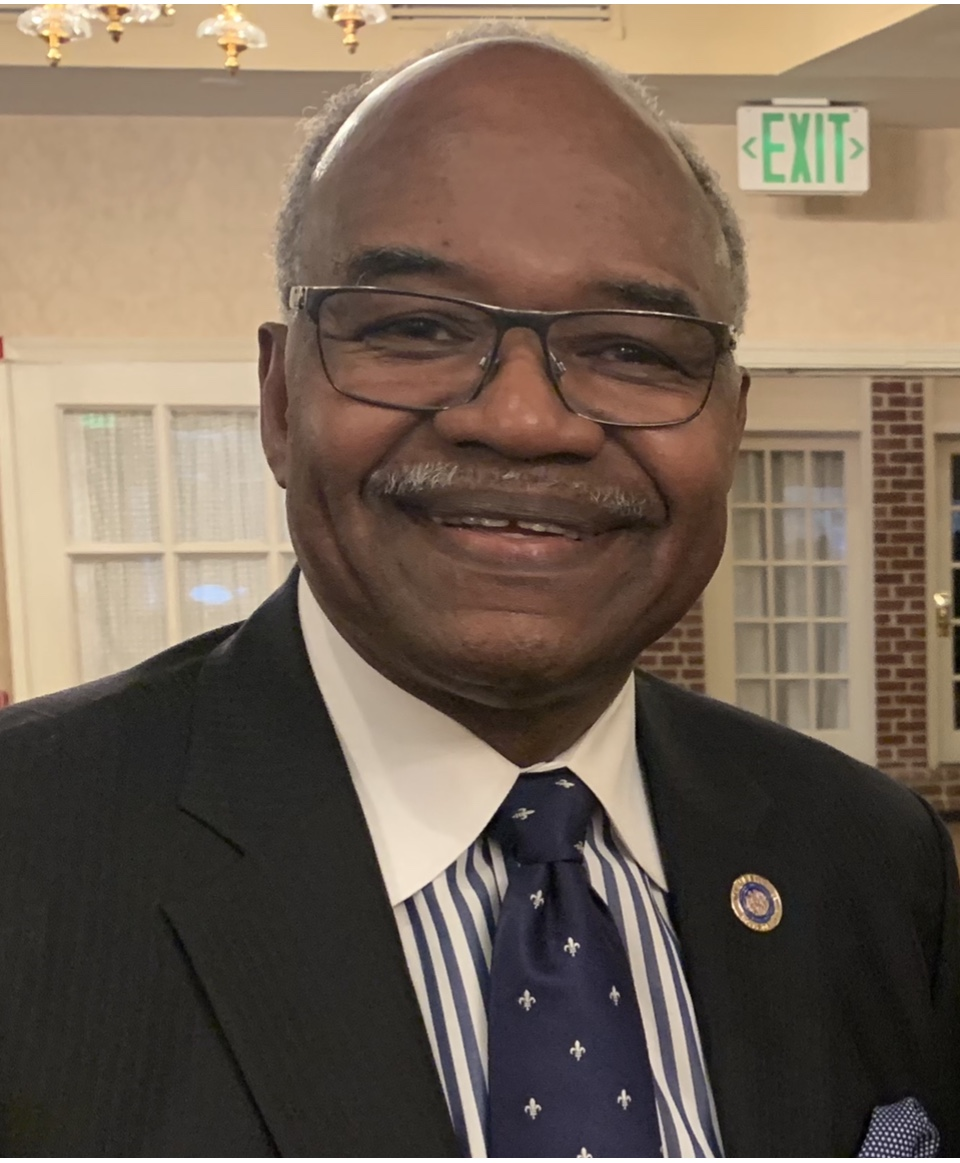

Member of the Maryland Senate from the 10th district
- Incumbent
- Assumed office January 11, 2023
- Preceded by: Delores G. Kelley

Member of the Maryland House of Delegates from the 10th district
- In office January 14, 2015 – January 11, 2023 Serving with Jay Jalisi and Adrienne A. Jones
- Preceded by: Emmett C. Burns Jr.
- Succeeded by: Jennifer White

Personal details
- Born: April 23, 1950 (age 76) Sumter, South Carolina, U.S.
- Party: Democratic
- Spouse: Irene Theresa (m. 1974)
- Children: 3
- Education: South Carolina State University (BS)

Military service
- Branch/service: United States Army
- Years of service: 1969–1972
- Battles/wars: Vietnam War

Benjamin Thomas Brooks Sr. (born April 23, 1950) is an American politician who has served as a member of the Maryland Senate for District 10, based in Baltimore County, since 2023. A member of the Democratic Party, he previously represented the district in the Maryland House of Delegates from 2015 to 2023.

== Early life and education ==
Benjamin Thomas Brooks Sr. was born in Sumter, South Carolina, on April 23, 1950. He was the fourth child and first son of Thomas Brooks Jr. and Hester Loouise Lane Brooks. Brooks graduated from Ebenezer High School. After graduating, Brooks served in the United States Army from 1969 to 1972, where he worked as a telephone repairman and earned the Commendation Medal, Army Good Conduct Medal, National Defense Medal, and the Vietnam Service Medal, and afterwards attended South Carolina State University, where he earned a bachelor of science degree in accounting in 1976.

== Career ==
After graduating from South Carolina State, Brooks worked as an accountant for Seagram, first as a junior accountant from 1976 to 1978 and then as a cost accountant until 1987. He has run his own tax service company, B & R Brooks Professional Tax Service, since 1987 and his own investment firm, Brooks Family Investments Inc., since 2004.

Brooks first got involved in politics in 2010, when he was elected as a member of the Baltimore County Democratic Central Committee. In December 2010, Baltimore County Executive Kevin Kamenetz appointed Brooks as chair of the county's liquor board, where he served until 2013.

=== Maryland General Assembly ===
Brooks ran for the Maryland House of Delegates in District 10 in 2014, during which he won the Democratic primary alongside Jay Jalisi and incumbent Adrienne A. Jones. He was sworn into the Maryland House of Delegates on January 14, 2015, where he served on the Economic Matters Committee during his entire tenure and as the chair of its public utilities subcommittee from 2019 to 2023. Brooks also served as deputy majority whip from 2017 to 2023. In 2019, Brooks sought to run for Treasurer of Maryland, challenging incumbent Nancy Kopp, but missed the deadline for filing to run. Despite this, Brooks received 24 votes in the treasurer election.

In 2022, Brooks ran for the Maryland Senate in District 10, seeking to succeed retiring state Senator Delores G. Kelley. During the Democratic primary, he was endorsed by Kelley and ran on a slate with Adrienne Jones, N. Scott Phillips, and Jennifer White. He also faced colleague Jay Jalisi, whom he defeated with 37.6 percent of the vote. Brooks was sworn into the Maryland Senate on January 11, 2023, and has since served on the Education, Energy, and the Environment Committee.

Brooks is a member of the Legislative Black Caucus of Maryland and the Maryland Veterans Caucus. He was a delegate to the 2016 Democratic National Convention, pledged to Hillary Clinton.

== Political positions ==
=== Energy ===
During the 2020 legislative session, Brooks introduced a bill to create timelines for Maryland's remaining power plants to transition away from coal and establish a transition fund to mitigate economic impacts for employees. The bill was withdrawn after he and Senate sponsor Chris West announced a deal with AES Corporation that would cause the Warrior Run Generating Station to stop burning coal in 2030.

=== Environment ===
During the 2023 legislative session, Brooks introduced legislation to establish the Maryland Native Plants Program to encourage garden centers to plant native vegetation. The bill passed and was signed into law by Governor Wes Moore.

=== Housing ===
During the 2026 legislative session, Brooks introduced the Building Affordably in My Backyard Act, which creates an express approval process for residential development projects in jurisdictions that have formally identified a shortage of affordable housing.

=== Immigration ===
In November 2015, Brooks signed onto a letter calling on Governor Larry Hogan to allow refugees of the Syrian civil war into Maryland after Hogan said that he would ask the Obama administration to stop sending such refugees to the state.

=== Policing ===
In November 2020, Brooks expressed support for stricter regulations on police. He attended a simulated police training exercise hosted by the Maryland Fraternal Order of Police, which he said gave him emphasize with the split-second decisions officers have to make, but did not change his mind on policing reforms.

=== Redistricting ===
In October 2021, Brooks joined a lawsuit against the Baltimore County Council's redistricting plan, which resulted in a new map with a second minority opportunity district.

In February 2026, Brooks said he opposed pursuing mid-decade redistricting in Maryland to redraw Maryland's congressional districts to improve the Democratic Party's chances of winning the 1st congressional district, the only congressional district held by Republicans in the state, saying that it would not be representative to take away that one seat for the Republican Party.

== Personal life ==
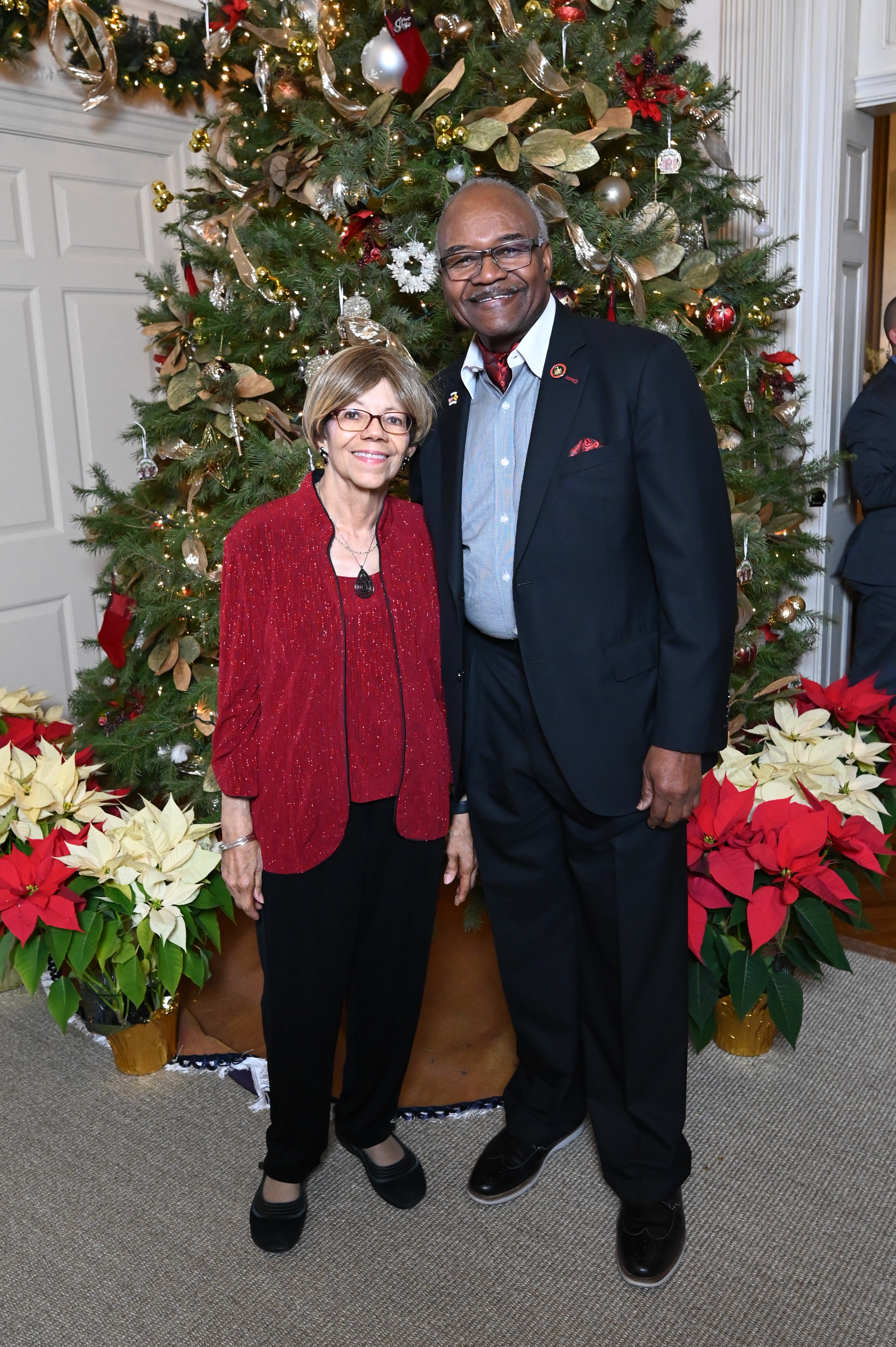
Brooks and his wife Irene at a Government House holiday reception, 2024

Brooks married his wife, Irene Theresa, on August 10, 1974. Together, they have three adult children. He is a member of St. Gabriel Catholic Church in Windsor Mill, Maryland.

== Awards and honors ==
In December 2024, during a visit to his hometown of Sumter, South Carolina, Brooks was issued a medallion by city officials and December 15, 2024, was declared Senator Benjamin T. Brooks Sr. Day.

== Electoral history ==
Maryland House of Delegates District 10 Democratic primary election, 2014
Party	Candidate	Votes	%
Democratic	Adrienne A. Jones (incumbent)	8,995	25.4
Democratic	Jay Jalisi	6,146	17.4
Democratic	Benjamin Brooks	5,507	15.6
Democratic	Carin Smith	5,197	14.7
Democratic	Robert "Rob" Johnson	3,369	9.5
Democratic	Chris Blake	2,085	5.9
Democratic	Michael Tyrone Brown, Sr.	1,868	5.3
Democratic	Regg J. Hatcher, Jr.	1,121	3.2
Democratic	Frederick Strickland	1,104	3.1

Maryland House of Delegates District 10 election, 2014
Party	Candidate	Votes	%
Democratic	Adrienne A. Jones (incumbent)	24,104	29.6
Democratic	Benjamin Brooks	23,703	29.1
Democratic	Jay Jalisi	23,339	28.7
Republican	William T. Newton	9,906	12.2
Write-in		348	0.4

Maryland House of Delegates District 10 election, 2018
Party	Candidate	Votes	%
Democratic	Adrienne A. Jones (incumbent)	33,830	27.4
Democratic	Benjamin Brooks (incumbent)	33,066	26.8
Democratic	Jay Jalisi (incumbent)	32,587	26.4
Republican	George H. Harman	8,525	6.9
Republican	Brian Marcos	7,706	6.2
Republican	Matthew Kaliszak	7,458	6.0
Write-in		159	0.1

Maryland Senate District 10 Democratic primary election, 2022
Party	Candidate	Votes	%
Democratic	Benjamin Brooks	6,432	37.6
Democratic	Jay Jalisi	5,347	31.3
Democratic	Stephanie Boston	3,087	18.0
Democratic	Lawrence Williams	2,245	13.1

Maryland Senate District 10 election, 2022
Party	Candidate	Votes	%
Democratic	Benjamin Brooks	31,373	78.6
Republican	William Newton	8,460	21.2
Write-in		65	0.2
