= Chris Kluwe =

American football player and writer (born 1981)

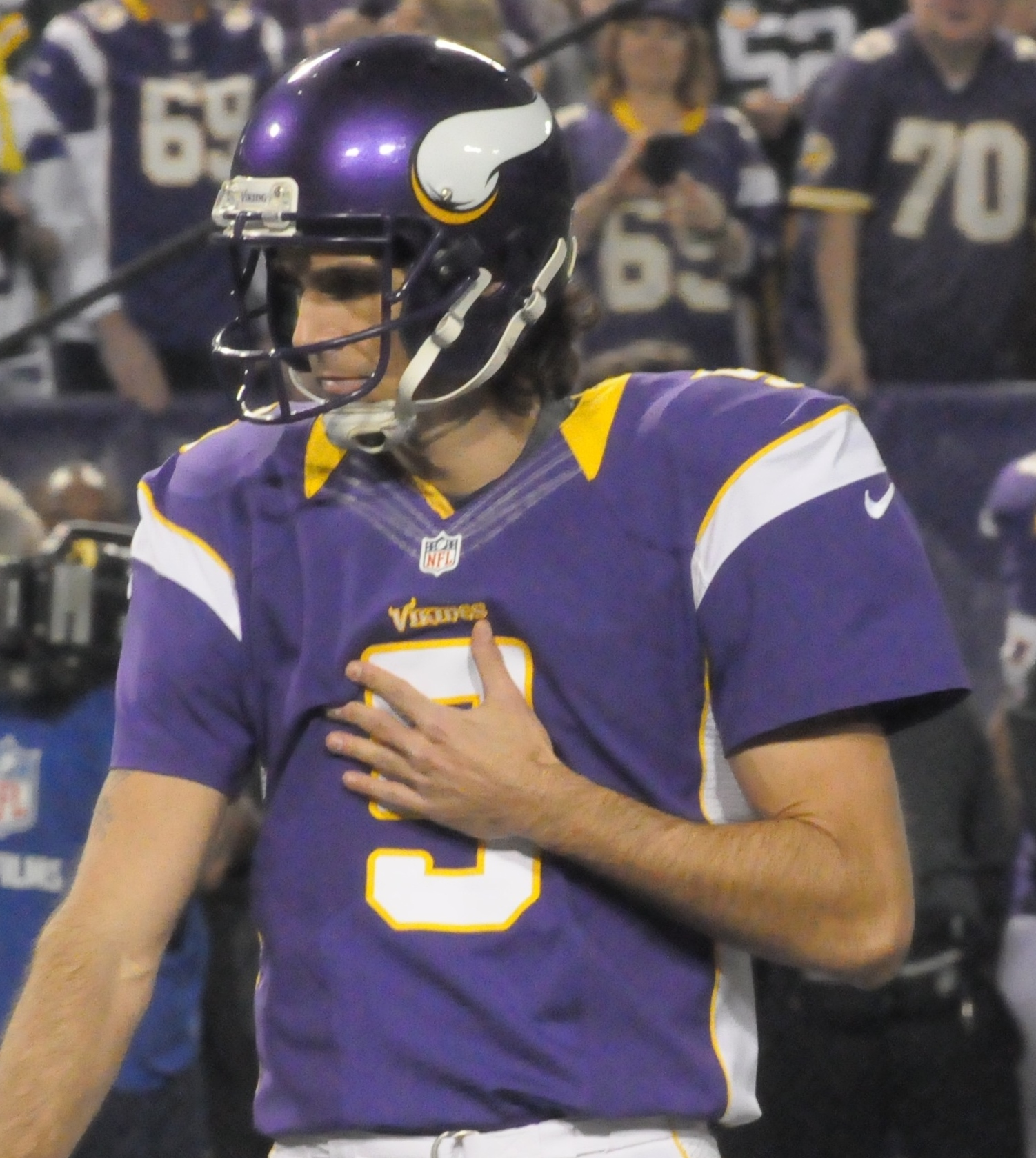
- Kluwe with the Minnesota Vikings in 2012

No. 5, 4
- Position: Punter

Personal information
- Born: December 24, 1981 (age 44); Philadelphia, Pennsylvania, U.S.
- Listed height: 6 ft 4 in (1.93 m)
- Listed weight: 215 lb (98 kg)

Career information
- High school: Los Alamitos (Los Alamitos, California)
- College: UCLA (2000–2004)
- NFL draft: 2005: undrafted

Career history
- Seattle Seahawks (2005)*; Minnesota Vikings (2005–2012); Oakland Raiders (2013)*
- * Offseason or practice squad member only

Awards and highlights
- PFWA All-Rookie Team (2005); Minnesota Vikings All-Mall of America Field Team; Second-team All-Pac-10 (2004); Las Vegas Bowl champion (2002)

Career NFL statistics
- Punts: 623
- Punting yards: 27,683
- Punting yard average: 44.4
- Stats at Pro Football Reference

Christopher James Kluwe (/ˈkluːi/ KLOO-ee; born December 24, 1981) is an American writer, social activist, politician, and former professional football player who was a punter in the National Football League (NFL). He played college football for the UCLA Bruins before signing with the Seattle Seahawks as an undrafted free agent in 2005. He played in the NFL for the Seahawks, Minnesota Vikings, and Oakland Raiders.

Kluwe is widely known for his eight seasons with the Minnesota Vikings, where he set eight individual team records. During this period, he became an outspoken advocate on social issues, including same-sex marriage and gay rights, which led to tension between Kluwe and coaching staff.

The Vikings released Kluwe after the 2012 season. He signed with the Oakland Raiders before the 2013 season and was subsequently released. He was unable to sign with another NFL team, which he attributed to his criticism of homophobia and misogyny in the NFL. He retired from professional football in 2013. Since leaving football, Kluwe has pursued a writing career and was a humor columnist for the sports website Deadspin. In 2026, he was the Democratic nominee for California State Assembly in District 72.

== Early life ==
Kluwe played three years of varsity football for coach John Barnes at Los Alamitos High School in Los Alamitos, California, and was selected to play in both the California-Texas Shrine game (where he kicked a 57-yard game-winning field goal with no time left) and the CaliFlorida Bowl. He was named a USA Today first-team All-American as a punter. He kicked an Orange County and CIF Playoff record 60-yard field goal vs. Loyola to force overtime in an eventual 30–23 victory.

Averaging 46.6 yards as a punter, he had 10 punts of at least 60 yards and placed six kicks inside the 10-yard line. As a placekicker, he made 16 of 22 field goal attempts and 39 of 41 PATs. Prior to his senior year, he won the punting competition at the National Kicking Invitational with a 63-yard punt that had 4.98 seconds of hang time. Kluwe also played one year of baseball as a pitcher.

== College career ==
Kluwe enrolled at the University of California, Los Angeles (UCLA), where he developed into one of the top punters in the Pac-10 Conference. He graduated in 2005 with a double major in political science and history. He set school records for both total punt yardage and total number of punts in a season in 2003. In his senior year, he ranked 3rd in the Pac-10 and 12th in the NCAA in yards per punt (43.4). He was selected as special teams player of the game in the Silicon Valley Football Classic against Fresno State after averaging 44.3 yards on nine kicks. He also tied the bowl record with his nine punts and placed three kicks inside the 20-yard line. Kluwe was a finalist in his senior year for the Ray Guy Award that annually recognizes the best collegiate punter.

== Professional career ==
Pre-draft measurables
Height	Weight
6 ft 4 5/8 in (1.95 m)	215 lb (98 kg)
Values from Pro Day

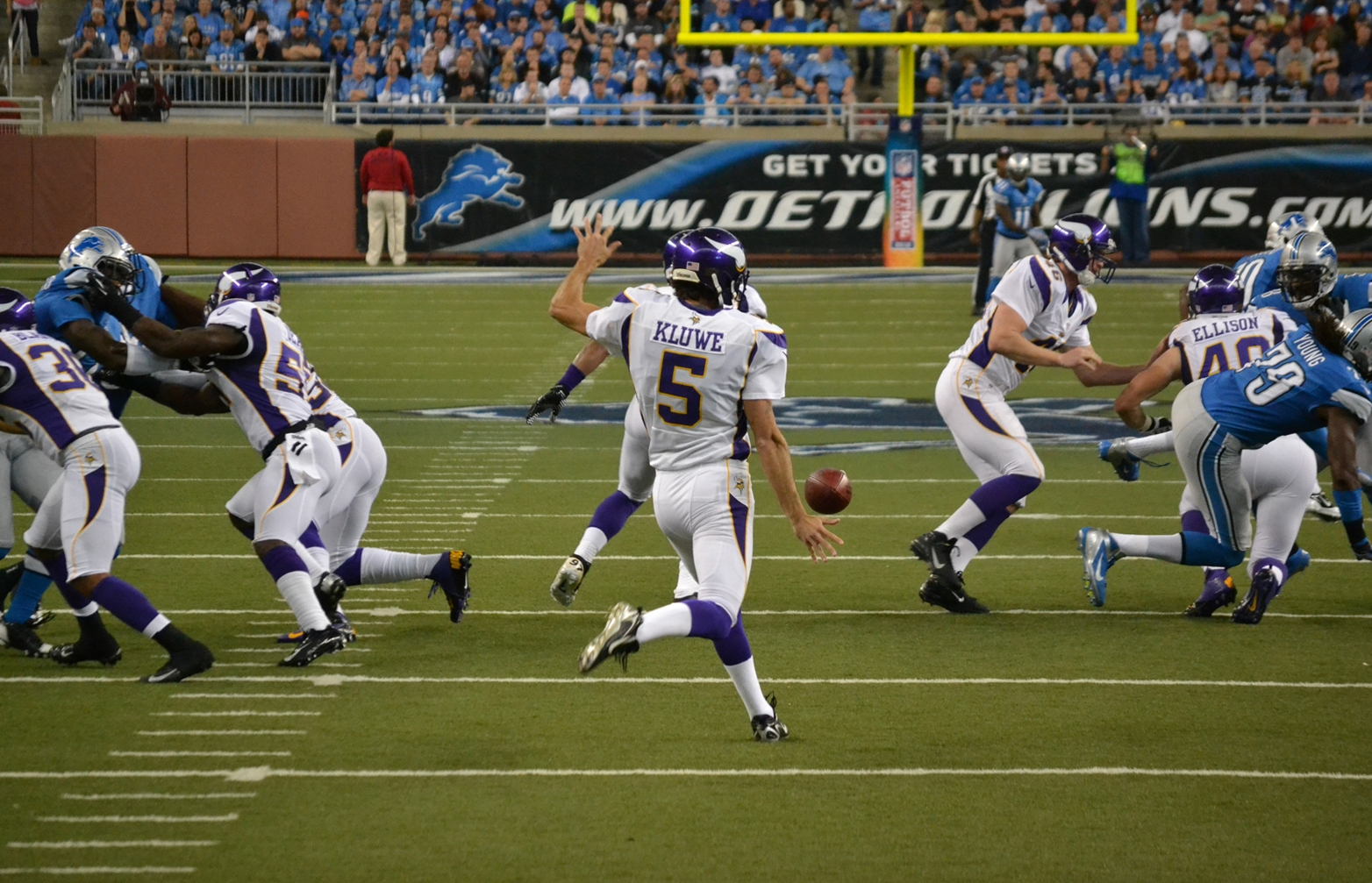
Kluwe punts in a game against the Detroit Lions in 2012.

=== Seattle Seahawks ===
Kluwe was signed as an undrafted free agent by the Seattle Seahawks in 2005. Kluwe had been notified by both the Seahawks and St. Louis Rams that either team might draft him in the late rounds. As soon as the draft ended, Kluwe signed a free agent contract with Seattle. Kluwe had an excellent training camp with Seattle, to the point where Donnie Jones was released after the first week of Organized Team Activities, leaving Kluwe and Leo Araguz splitting time during the pre-season games for the punting duties.

Kluwe was told by the Seahawks prior to the final pre-season game they were going to take him to the practice squad and the Seahawks wanted Kluwe both as a potential back-up and for developmental reasons. Due to NFL rules, the Seahawks had to place Kluwe on the waiver wire for 24 hours prior to signing him to a practice squad contract. The Seahawks waited until the last minute to place Kluwe on the waiver wire as they knew three teams had been scouting Kluwe as a potential punter for their team. The Seahawks concerns were well founded as Kluwe was claimed off the waiver wire early the next day by the Vikings.

=== Minnesota Vikings ===
Kluwe became one of the most surprising pickups for the Vikings, finishing his first season with an average of 44.1 yards per punt, ranking second in the NFC and sixth in the league. He punted 71 times during his first season. Kluwe was also named NFC special teams player of the month for September 2005 – a first for any Vikings special teams rookie.

During a Week-13 game in Detroit, Lions safety Vernon Fox dove towards Kluwe during a punt and collided with Kluwe's plant foot. Although initial concerns were that Kluwe had a broken ankle, tests showed Kluwe had a sprained ankle. What the tests showed that earlier in the game when the ball was snapped over Kluwe's head and he had to make a running and jumping rugby style kick to avoid being blocked, he tore his right ACL when he landed after the kick.

Kicker Paul Edinger was the punter for the remainder of the game. A few days later the Vikings signed 42-year-old veteran Darren Bennett for 1 week. Kluwe then returned to play the final 3 games of the 2005 season with a torn ACL in his kicking leg, which prompted his then coach Mike Tice to reply to a reporter's question about Kluwe's injury that "My punter is a tough guy."

As Tice was not known to be sympathetic towards punters and kickers, this showed the amount of respect he had for Kluwe's willingness to play with a serious injury. During the 2006 off-season Kluwe had arthroscopic surgery on his right knee to repair the ACL. The operation was successful and Kluwe returned to the Vikings in full health for the 2006 season.

On October 25, 2007, Kluwe signed an $8.3-million contract extension to 2013. The deal made Kluwe, who would have been a restricted free agent in the 2008 offseason, one of the 10 highest-paid punters in the NFL.

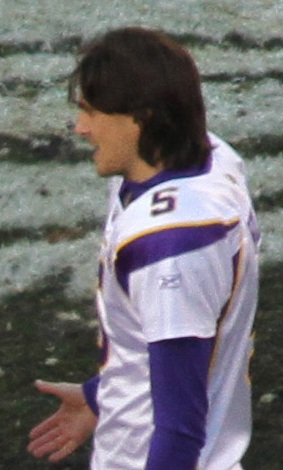
Kluwe after a game in 2010

On December 20, 2010, Kluwe had the dubious distinction of punting the ball that the Chicago Bears' Devin Hester would return for a touchdown, breaking the all-time NFL record for combined punt and kickoff returns for touchdowns. Previously in the game, Kluwe had successfully kept the ball out of Hester's hands on four punts.

In 2011, Kluwe changed his jersey number when the Vikings acquired quarterback Donovan McNabb. McNabb previously wore #5 for the Washington Redskins and Philadelphia Eagles, and requested the same number when he arrived in Minnesota, which was then being worn by Kluwe. Kluwe agreed on the condition that McNabb make a $5,000 donation to charity, to mention Kluwe's band Tripping Icarus five times during McNabb's press conferences, and to buy Kluwe an ice cream cone.

Kluwe took up #4, which had been worn by quarterback Brett Favre in 2009 and 2010. After McNabb left the team, Kluwe reclaimed his old #5 for the 2012 season.

After a poor performance in an October 25, 2012, game against the Tampa Bay Buccaneers, the Vikings brought in several punters for workouts to potentially replace Kluwe. Kluwe had been playing since 2007 with a torn meniscus. His discomfort caused by the condition late in 2012 led to him deciding to have surgery during the off-season. In January 2013, the team signed punter T. J. Conley to a futures contract. Kluwe finished the 2012 season with an average of 45.0 yards per punt, ranking tenth in the NFC and 22nd in the league.

Kluwe had arthroscopic surgery on his left knee to repair a torn meniscus in early 2013. Recovery was uneventful and Kluwe was back to full health in a matter of weeks. During the 2013 NFL draft, the Vikings drafted Jeff Locke (UCLA) in the 5th round of the draft as a punter. Speculation immediately began that Kluwe's days with the Vikings were numbered due to the use of a relatively high draft round pick for a punter. On May 6, 2013, the Vikings released Kluwe.

==== Vikings team records ====
Kluwe holds a number of team punt records for the Minnesota Vikings (see list below).

1. #1 Career Punt Avg., 44.4, 2005–2012
2. #1 Game Punt Avg., 54.3, 2005
3. #1 Rookie Game Punt Avg., 54.3, 2005
4. #1 Career Playoff Punt Avg., 45.2, 2005–2012
5. #1 Average Punts per Season, 78, 2005–2012
6. #1 Career Punts Inside 20, 198, 2005–2012
7. #1, #2, #5 Season Punts Inside 20, 34 / 32 / 28, 2007 / 2010 / 2006
8. #1 Game Punts Inside 20, 5, 2007
9. #8 (tied) Career Blocked Punts, 1, 2005–2012
10. #2 Career Punts, 623, 2005–2012
11. #2 Rookie Season Punts, 71, 2005
12. #2 Season Fewest Touchbacks, 2, 2012
13. #2 Career Net Yds. Avg., 37.2, 2005–2012
14. #2, #4 Season Net Yds. Avg., 39.7 / 38.9, 2012 / 2010

=== Oakland Raiders ===
Kluwe signed with the Oakland Raiders on May 15, 2013, less than two weeks after being released by the Vikings. He signed for a veteran minimum contract for one year. Kluwe was given his old number (#5) by the Raiders and competed with Marquette King for the position of punter. Kluwe thanked the Raiders for picking him up, saying, "I am glad to be a Raider and playing back in California, where I grew up." On September 1, Kluwe tweeted that the Raiders had released him.

On January 3, 2014, Kluwe retired from football. After a year of not playing, he did not want to attempt playing in the NFL again, and believed his chances were slim given his outspoken views about same-sex marriage and criticism of the Vikings.

== Career statistics ==
=== NFL ===
Legend
**Bold**	Career high

==== Regular season ====
Year	Team	Punting									
Year	Team	GP	Punts	Yds	Net Yds	Lng	Avg	Net Avg	Blk	Ins20	TB
2005	MIN	15	71	3,130	2,540	62	44.1	35.8	0	17	6
2006	MIN	**16**	**93**	**3,934**	**3,309**	68	42.3	35.6	0	28	7
2007	MIN	**16**	81	3,621	3,001	**70**	44.7	37.0	0	**34**	9
2008	MIN	**16**	73	3,473	2,589	62	**47.6**	35.0	**1**	23	**13**
2009	MIN	**16**	73	3,202	2,762	60	43.9	37.8	0	24	9
2010	MIN	**16**	83	3,569	3,228	59	43.0	38.9	0	32	5
2011	MIN	**16**	77	3,517	2,925	60	45.7	38.0	0	22	3
2012	MIN	**16**	72	3,237	2,856	59	45.0	**39.7**	0	18	2
Career		127	623	27,683	23,210	70	44.4	37.2	1	198	54

==== Playoffs ====
Year	Team	Punting									
Year	Team	GP	Punts	Yds	Net Yds	Lng	Avg	Net Avg	Blk	Ins20	TB
2008	MIN	1	8	362	253	60	45.3	31.6	0	2	0
2009	MIN	**2**	**9**	**384**	**364**	**61**	42.7	40.4	0	**3**	**1**
2012	MIN	1	5	248	231	56	**49.6**	**46.2**	0	1	0
Career		4	22	994	848	61	45.2	38.5	0	6	1

=== College ===
Year	Team	Punts	Yards	Average	In 20	Long
2001	UCLA	1	25	25.0	0	25
2002	UCLA	1	44	44.0	0	44
2003	UCLA	91	3908	42.9	19	66
2004	UCLA	61	2647	43.4	24	68
Totals		154	6624	43.0	43	68

== Activism ==
=== 2011 NFL lockout ===
During the 2011 NFL lockout, the Boston Globe reported that an agreement between owners and the players' union was being held up by special considerations for a few top employees, Peyton Manning, Drew Brees, Vincent Jackson, and Logan Mankins. Kluwe tweeted his frustration at this impasse, assailing their greed and calling them "douchebags".

After Nate Jackson wrote an article on the sports website Deadspin excoriating Kluwe for talking "out of turn", Kluwe responded with his own article, highlighting the contrast between his own fruitful career and Jackson's lack of statistics, while reiterating his opinion that four people endangering the livelihoods of the 1,900 affected by the dispute was "pretty much the definition of greed".

=== Same-sex marriage ===
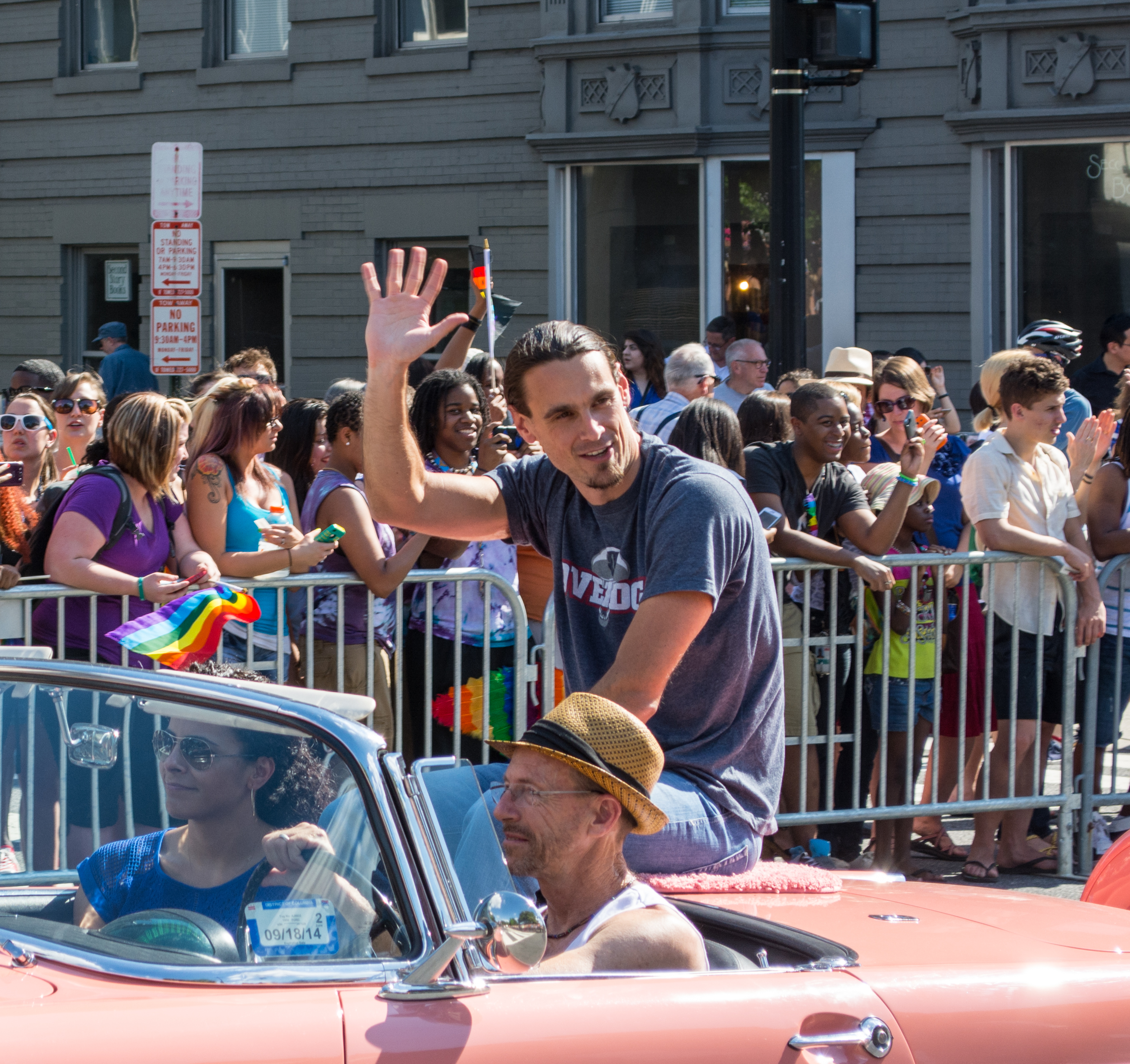
Kluwe at LGBT pride parade in Washington, D.C., in 2014

On September 7, 2012, Kluwe published a letter on Deadspin that he had sent to Maryland state assembly delegate Emmett Burns, defending the opinions of Baltimore Ravens linebacker Brendon Ayanbadejo and condemning Burns's attempt to stifle Ayanbadejo's free speech. Ayanbadejo was a vocal supporter of same-sex marriage and Burns had sent a letter requesting that the Ravens ownership "inhibit such expressions".

On October 1, 2012, Kluwe published a letter to the editor that responded to a video statement released by former Viking Matt Birk supporting a ban on same-sex marriage. In the letter, Kluwe outlined six reasons he disagreed with Birk. Kluwe was also featured in the documentary The Last Barrier, which aired on NBC Bay Area on December 8, 2012. In it, he talks about his feelings about equality.

Kluwe and Ayanbadejo filed an amicus brief to the United States Supreme Court on February 28, 2013, regarding Hollingsworth v. Perry, in which they expressed their support of the challenge to California Proposition 8. Kluwe appeared on the January 18, 2013, episode of The Ellen DeGeneres Show to discuss his support of same-sex marriage. Ellen DeGeneres inducted Kluwe as the first member of her Hall of Fame, since punters are unlikely to be voted into the NFL hall of fame. On April 16, 2013, in recognition of his steadfast support of same-sex marriage and for starting a conversation about LGBT issues in athletics, Kluwe was named the Grand Marshal of the 41st annual Twin Cities Pride festival in Minneapolis.

On January 2, 2014, Kluwe accused the Vikings of releasing him due to his support of same-sex marriage. He said the Vikings had asked that he "deliberately sacrifice my own numbers to help the team, a request with which I always complied". The team said it was not previously aware of Kluwe's allegations and that he "was released strictly based on his football performance." Kluwe said that in 2012 special teams coach Mike Priefer had made homophobic remarks and criticized Kluwe's views on same-sex marriage.

Priefer responded with a statement saying "I do not tolerate discrimination of any type and am respectful of all individuals. I personally have gay family members who I love and support just as I do any family member.” Kluwe called Priefer's acts "inexcusable" and said he hoped he had prevented Priefer from coaching again. He also said that head coach Leslie Frazier had told him to stop speaking out on same-sex marriage. Kluwe later acknowledged that his comments on Priefer were "a little too harsh originally" and said he preferred that Priefer get therapy and counseling and return to the league as a role model.

On January 3, 2014, the Vikings announced that former Chief Justice of the Minnesota Supreme Court Eric Magnuson and former U.S. Department of Justice Trial Attorney Chris Madel would investigate the allegations. On January 26, Kluwe's lawyer said that at least two witnesses confirmed the homophobic remarks were made and that a Vikings official was aware of those remarks before the team released Kluwe. In May, Madel said the investigation could be delayed until June due to an uncooperative key witness. In August, Kluwe and the Vikings settled for an undisclosed donation to organizations serving LGBT causes.

=== Pro Football Hall of Fame ===
During a December 2012 game against Chicago Bears, Kluwe covered the Pro Football Hall of Fame patch on his uniform with a post-it note with a message "Vote Ray Guy" as a protest against the Hall's 50th Anniversary celebrations due to the lack of pure punters in the Hall. The NFL fined Kluwe $5,250 for a uniform violation. In 2014, Guy was voted into the Hall of Fame.

=== City council protest arrest ===
On February 18, 2025, Kluwe was arrested at a city council meeting in Huntington Beach, California, after protesting the city's decision to display a plaque at the city library that features an acrostic of MAGA. Kluwe then announced his intention to commit peaceful civil disobedience and began walking toward the council members, which prompted police officers in attendance to place him in handcuffs and remove him from the meeting. After his arrest Kluwe was fired from his coaching job at Huntington Beach's Edison High School.

=== 2026 California State Assembly campaign ===
In June 2025, Kluwe told The Orange County Register that he would run for the California State Assembly in District 72 as a Democrat, seeking to succeed Republican assembly member Diane Dixon, who is retiring.

== Personal life ==
Kluwe and his wife, Isabel, have two children. Until 2012, Kluwe wrote "Out of Bounds", a blog named that appeared on the St. Paul Pioneer Press's website. He quit the column in protest after the paper published an editorial in support of the Minnesota Marriage Amendment, which would have amended the state constitution to ban same-sex marriage: Kluwe was not surprised by the paper's position but felt that the editorial was derogatory to amendment opponents while feigning neutrality.

Kluwe describes himself as "cheerfully agnostic." He has said he is "confused" by atheism, but agreed to speak at the 2014 American Atheists Convention. He has said that his politics "lean toward the libertarian side" but that he has "never been a big fan of labels".

During his 2026 California State Assembly campaign, Kluwe condemned both politicians he believed sought to undermine transgender rights and healthcare and Democrats he believed were not doing enough to combat anti-transgender legislation. He also supported stronger regulation of law enforcement's usage of Flock Safety cameras.

=== Video games ===
Kluwe is an avid Guitar Hero 2 player, having once made an appearance on Minnesota's 93X radio station while playing the game with Andy McNamara from Game Informer magazine. He is a frequent guest on Minnesota sports station KFAN for "Video Games Weekly" on Wednesday nights. During a KFAN interview on the PA and Dubay show, he admitted he was not very good at sports games.

Kluwe once immersed himself in the MMORPG World of Warcraft, playing a troll rogue named Loate, and has been a member of one of the formerly top-ranked US guilds, The Flying Hellfish, for over four years.

Kluwe appeared in a video promoting the MOBA League of Legends, saying he plays the AD Carry position and that his favorite champion to play in the game is Vayne. He said he believes eSports is a "burgeoning culture of actual sports" and that it will continue to grow into a legitimate sports scene, based on low barrier to entry, the entertainment value of watching professional players, team-based engagement, and continued social acceptance. He has a Sniper class, hero level character named in his honor in XCOM: Enemy Within, an expansion to XCOM: Enemy Unknown. He won this honor after defeating Firaxis producer and designer Garth DeAngelis in a best-of-three series of online matches of XCOM.

== Other ventures ==
=== Music ===
Kluwe is the bassist for the local Minneapolis alternative/progressive metal band, Tripping Icarus. Kluwe formed the band in 2009 with friends Andrew Reiner (guitar) and Matthew Marshall (drums), and later recruited Jesse Revel to join on lead vocals. Tripping Icarus recorded their debut EP, The Sideshow Sessions, in the summer of 2009. A year later, they recorded their first full-length LP, Perfect Citizen, which was slated for an early 2011 release.

Their producer Andrew Lindberg was killed in a car accident May 2010. Tripping Icarus threw a memorial concert at Minneapolis’ First Avenue. When Donovan McNabb was traded to Minnesota before the 2011 season, Kluwe offered McNabb the number 5 jersey in exchange for mentioning Tripping Icarus in at least five press conferences, as well as donating $5,000 to Kluwe's charity, and an ice cream cone. McNabb didn't mention the band in five separate press conferences, but Kluwe concedes that "in his very first press conference, he mentioned it like twelve times".

=== Writing ===
Kluwe has written a book, Beautifully Unique Sparkleponies (Little Brown & Co.), released on June 25, 2013. It is a collection of essays on various topics. The title comes from the public consumption version of Kluwe's Deadspin letter to Maryland General Assembly Delegate Emmett Burns. With Andrew Reiner, Kluwe co-wrote Prime: A Genesis Series Event (Volume 1), the first book in a planned science fiction trilogy. His first novel, Otaku, was published by Tor in March 2020. He contributed a chapter titled "Preparation and Performance" to the 2024 book Kobold Guide to Roleplaying (Kobold Press).

=== Tabletop gaming ===
Kluwe released his first tabletop game, Twilight of the Gods, on August 31, 2017, published by Victory Point Games.

=== Coaching ===
Kluwe was hired as the special teams coach at Edison High School for the 2017 season. He was fired in February 2025 after his arrest for protesting the installation of a MAGA sign at a Huntington Beach library.
