= Jennifer White Holland =

American politician (born 1988)

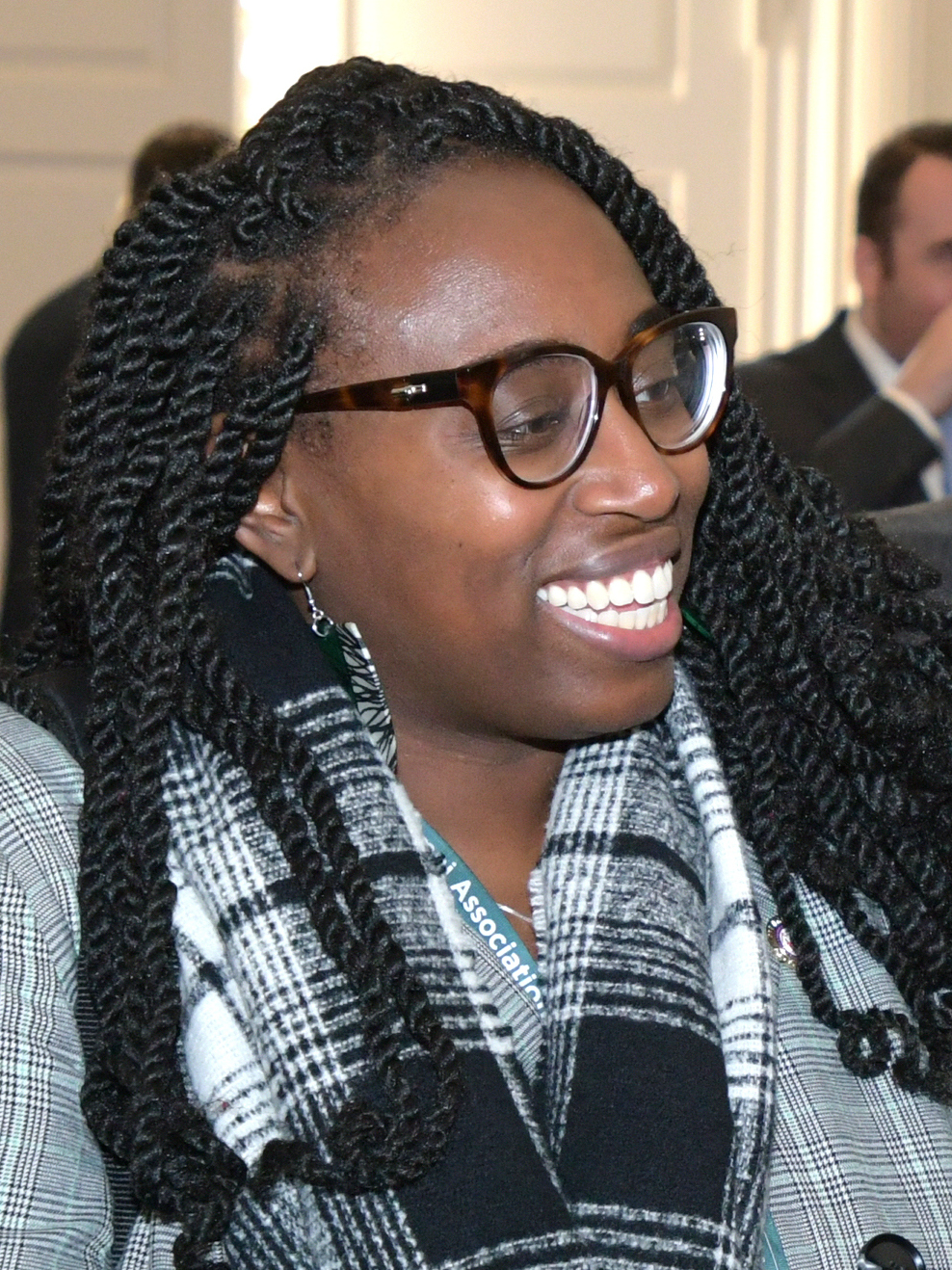
- White Holland in 2023

Member of the Maryland House of Delegates from the 10th district
- Incumbent
- Assumed office January 11, 2023 Serving with Adrienne A. Jones and N. Scott Phillips
- Preceded by: Benjamin Brooks

Personal details
- Born: Jennifer White; April 21, 1988 (age 38) Detroit, Michigan, U.S.
- Party: Democratic
- Children: 1
- Education: Michigan State University (BA); Johns Hopkins Bloomberg School of Public Health (MSPH)
- Profession: Nonprofit executive
- Website: Campaign website

Jennifer White Holland (born April 21, 1988) is an American politician who is a member of the Maryland House of Delegates for District 10 in Baltimore County, Maryland.

== Career ==
Jennifer White was born on April 21, 1988, in Detroit, Michigan. She attended Novi High School in Novi. She graduated from Michigan State University with a Bachelor of Arts degree with honors in political theory and constitutional democracy, and social relations and policy in 2010. She later attended the Johns Hopkins Bloomberg School of Public Health, where she earned a Master of Science degree in public health in 2012. White Holland is a non-profit executive and health equity partnerships manager.

In 2017, White Holland graduated from a training course hosted by Emerge Maryland, an organization created to prepare potential female Democratic candidates for public office. In 2022, she ran for the Maryland House of Delegates, running on a slate with Speaker of the Maryland House of Delegates Adrienne A. Jones, then-state delegate Benjamin Brooks, and management consultant N. Scott Phillips. She won the Democratic primary on July 19, receiving 19.2 percent of the vote.

== In the legislature ==
White Holland was sworn into the Maryland House of Delegates on January 11, 2023. She is a member of the House Health and Government Operations Committee and the chair of its maternal, infant & child health subcommittee.

== Personal life ==
White Holland is married and has a daughter. She attends religious services at the Douglas Memorial Community Church in Baltimore.

== Electoral history ==
Maryland House of Delegates District 10 Democratic primary election, 2022
Party	Candidate	Votes	%
Democratic	Adrienne A. Jones (incumbent)	12,591	28.7
Democratic	Jennifer White	8,410	19.2
Democratic	N. Scott Phillips	5,161	11.8
Democratic	Ruben Amaya	4,249	9.7
Democratic	Michael T. Brown, Sr.	4,085	9.3
Democratic	Korey T. Johnson	3,823	8.7
Democratic	Regg J. Hatcher, Jr.	2,347	5.4
Democratic	Nathaniel Logan	1,601	3.7
Democratic	Nathaniel Maurice Costley, Sr.	970	2.2
Democratic	Garland M. Jarratt Sanderson	612	1.4

Maryland House of Delegates District 10 election, 2022
Party	Candidate	Votes	%
Democratic	Adrienne A. Jones (incumbent)	29,842	29.42
Democratic	Jennifer White	27,925	27.53
Democratic	N. Scott Phillips	26,643	26.27
Republican	Patricia R. Fallon	9,024	8.90
Republican	Jordan Porompyae	7,685	7.58
Write-in		304	0.30
