= 2020 Maryland elections =

Maryland state elections in 2020 were held on Tuesday, November 3, 2020. Its primaries were held on June 2, 2020.

In addition to the U.S. presidential race, Maryland voters elected all of its seats to the House of Representatives and 3 of 7 seats on the Maryland Court of Appeals. It also voted on two ballot measures.

== Federal offices ==
=== President of the United States ===
Maryland had 10 electoral votes in the Electoral College. Democrat Joe Biden won all of them with 65% of the popular vote.

=== United States House of Representatives ===
There were 7 U.S. Representatives in Maryland that were up for election in addition to 1 open seat. 7 Democrats and 1 Republican were returned. No seats changed hands.

== State judiciary ==
All three incumbents whose seats were up for reelection ran again.

== Ballot measures ==
=== Question 1 ===
Question 1 Results by county Yes: 80–90%; 70–80%; 60–70%; 50–60%

Question 1
Choice	Votes	%
For	2,033,605	74.67
Against	689,975	25.33
Total	2,723,580	100.00

=== Question 2 ===
Question 2 Results by county Yes: 70–80%; 60–70%; 50–60%

Question 2 would allow the State Lottery and Gaming Control Commission to issue sports betting licenses.

Question 2
Choice	Votes	%
For	1,904,098	67.07
Against	934,950	32.93
Total	2,839,048	100.00

=== Polling ===
On Question 2

Poll source	Date(s) administered	Sample size (Note: Key: A – all adults RV – registered voters LV – likely voters V – unclear)	Margin of error	Yes (for the amendment)	No (against the amendment)
Change Research/Our Voice Maryland	September 29 – October 2, 2020	650 (V)	± 4.55%	52%	29%

On whether gambling should be expanded to allow sports betting online in Maryland

Poll source	Date(s) administered	Sample size	Margin of error	Yes	No	Other	Undecided
Goucher College	February 13–18, 2020	332 (A)	± 5.3%	47%	43%	1% (Note: "Refused" with 1%)	9%

On whether gambling should be expanded to allow sports betting online in Maryland

Poll source	Date(s) administered	Sample size	Margin of error	Yes	No	Other	Undecided
Goucher College	February 13–18, 2020	381 (A)	± 5%	45%	49%	>1% (Note: "Refused" with >1%)	6%
