= Shirley Nathan-Pulliam =

American politician (born 1939)

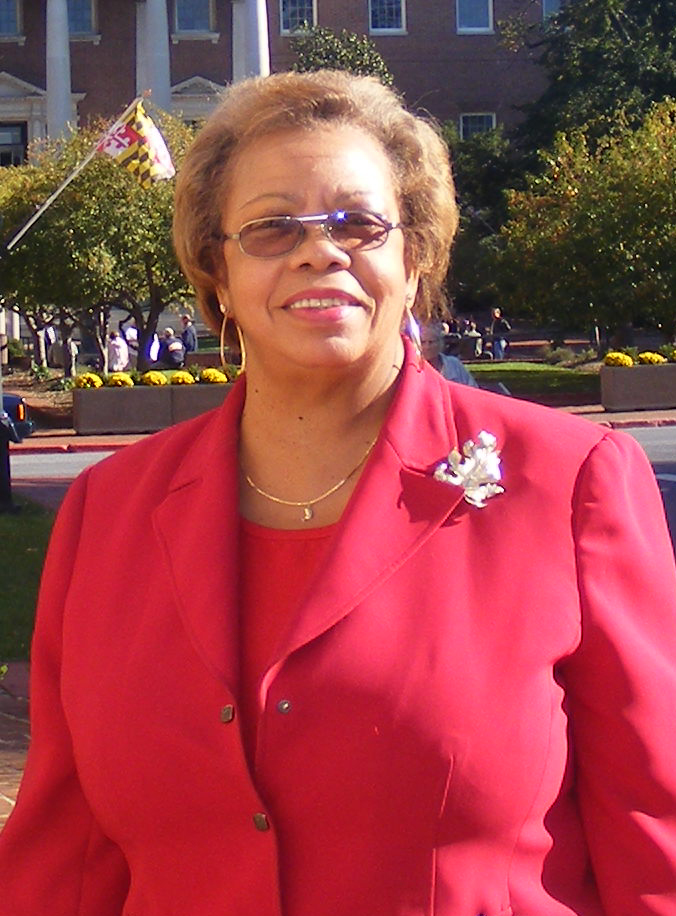

Member of the Maryland Senate from the 44th district
- In office January 14, 2015 – December 1, 2019
- Preceded by: Verna L. Jones
- Succeeded by: Charles E. Sydnor III

Member of the Maryland House of Delegates from the 10th district
- In office January 11, 1995 – January 14, 2015

Personal details
- Born: May 20, 1939 (age 87) Trelawny, Jamaica
- Party: Democratic
- Spouse: Divorced
- Children: three children; five grandchildren
- Education: Mico School, Kingston, Jamaica; Naburn and Bootham Park Hospitals School of Nursing, Yorkshire, England, 1960; Baltimore City Hospital School of Practical Nursing, L.P.N., 1962
- Alma mater: Baltimore Community College, A.A. (nursing), 1975; University of Maryland at Baltimore, B.S. (nursing), 1980; The Johns Hopkins University, M.A.S. (administrative science), 1987
- Profession: Registered nurse, Faculty Associate, The Johns Hopkins University School of Nursing, 1997-2000

Shirley Nathan-Pulliam (born May 20, 1939) is a former American politician from Maryland and a member of the Democratic Party. She was the first African-Caribbean woman to be elected to the Maryland General Assembly. Pulliam resigned in 2019 due to poor health.

== Background ==
Nathan-Pulliam was born in Trelawny, Jamaica on May 20, 1939. She attended Park Hospital School of Nursing in Yorkshire, England. While studying there she met her husband, a member of the United States Army, they married and moved to Baltimore, Maryland, in 1960.

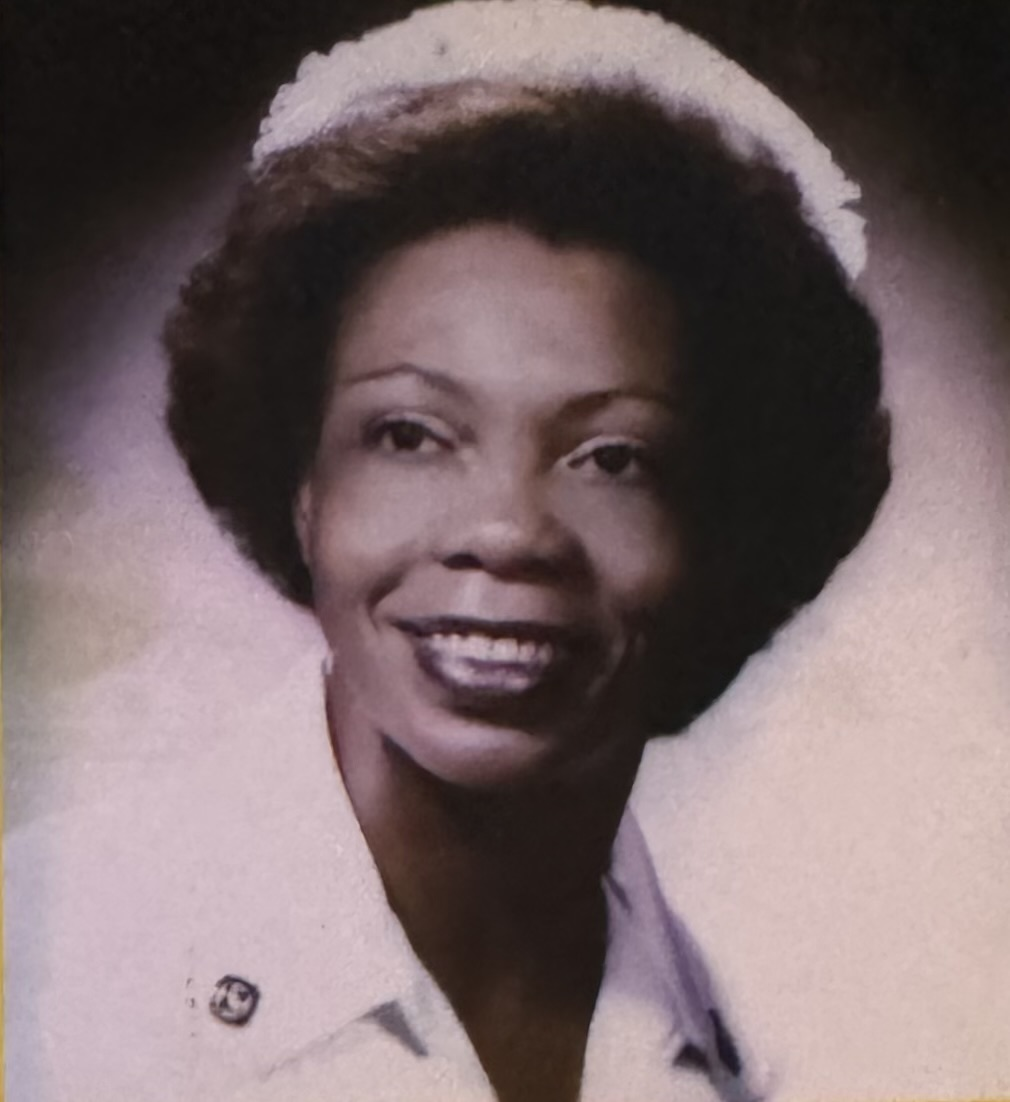

She earned her bachelor's degree in nursing from the University of Maryland at Baltimore in 1980 and a master's degree in administrative science from the Johns Hopkins University in 1984. In addition to owning her own business, she has been a faculty associate in nursing for Johns Hopkins. Before being elected in 1994, Nathan-Pulliam was active with Democratic Party organizations at the state and national level, as well as with Planned Parenthood of Maryland and various professional nursing organizations. Nathan-Pulliam has received a number of awards for her advocacy on health care.

== In the Legislature ==
Nathan-Pulliam represented Maryland's 44th Legislative District—located in parts of Baltimore County and Baltimore City—while in the Maryland General Assembly. She was a member of the Education Health and Environmental Affairs Committee. While in the Maryland House of Delegates, Nathan-Pulliam served as a deputy majority whip and as a member of the Health and Government Operations Committee. She was also a member of both the Legislative Black Caucus of Maryland and of Women Legislators of Maryland.

=== Legislative notes ===
- voted for income tax reduction in 1998 (SB750)
- voted in favor of increasing the sales tax whilst simultaneously reducing income tax rates for some income brackets - Tax Reform Act of 2007(HB2)
- voted in favor of in-state tuition for individuals who are not permanent residents, under certain conditions - Higher Education -Tuition Charges -Maryland High School Students, 2007 (HB6)

== Retirement ==
Senator Pulliam did not run in the 2020 elections because of health concerns. On January 30, 2023, her name was placed on the facade of the newest multi-million-dollar wing of the University of Maryland Nursing school. On May 18, 2023, she accepted an honorary Doctor of Public Service Degree from the University of Maryland, Baltimore County.

== Election results ==
=== 1994 General election results District 10 ===
Voters to choose three:

Name	Votes	Percent	Outcome
Clifford H. Andrews	4,039	6%	Lost
Emmett C. Burns Jr.	17,637	27%	Won
Shirley Nathan-Pulliam	17,411	26%	Won
Beverly E. Goldstein	5,535	8%	Lost
Clifton McDonald	4,321	7%	Lost
Joan N. Parker	16,919	26%	Won

=== 1998 General election results District 10 ===
Voters to choose three:

Name	Votes	Percent	Outcome
Emmett C. Burns Jr.	23,203	36%	Won
Adrienne A. Jones	20,676	32%	Won
Shirley Nathan-Pulliam	21,348	33%	Won

=== 2002 General election results District 10 ===
Voters to choose three:

Name	Votes	Percent	Outcome
Emmett C. Burns Jr.	27,921	31.52%	Won
Adrienne A. Jones	25,655	28.96%	Won
Shirley Nathan-Pulliam	26,269	29.66%	Won

=== 2006 General election results District 10 ===
Voters to choose three:

Name	Votes	Percent	Outcome
Emmett C. Burns, Jr.	29,140	34.2%	Won
Adrienne A. Jones	27,064	31.8%	Won
Shirley Nathan-Pulliam	28,544	33.5%	Won
Other Write-Ins	370	0.4%	

=== 2010 General election results District 10 ===
Voters to choose three:

Name	Votes	Percent	Outcome
Emmett C. Burns Jr.	31,513	31.60%	Won
Brian C Eybs (Write In)	16	0.00%	Lost
Adrienne A. Jones	29,719	29.80%	Won
Shirley Nathan-Pulliam	31,399	31.50%	Won
Jeanne L. Turnock	6,837	6.90%	Lost
Michael Tyrone Brown, Sr. (Write In)	9	0.00%	Lost
Frederick Ware-Newsome (Write In)	11	0.00%	Lost
Other Write-Ins	296	0.30%	N/A

=== 2014 General election results District 44 ===
Voters to choose one:

Name	Votes	Percent	Outcome
Shirley Nathan-Pulliam	26,261	80.2%	Won
Bernard Reiter	6,412	19.6%	Lost
Other Write-Ins	51	0.2%	N/A

=== 2018 General election results District 44 ===
Voters to choose one:

Name	Votes	Percent	Outcome
Victor Clark, Jr.	6,280	15.2%	Lost
Shirley Nathan-Pulliam	34,834	84.5%	Won
Other Write-Ins	86	0.2%	N/A
