= Maryland Legislative District 10 =

American legislative district

Maryland's legislative district 10
- Represents part of Baltimore County
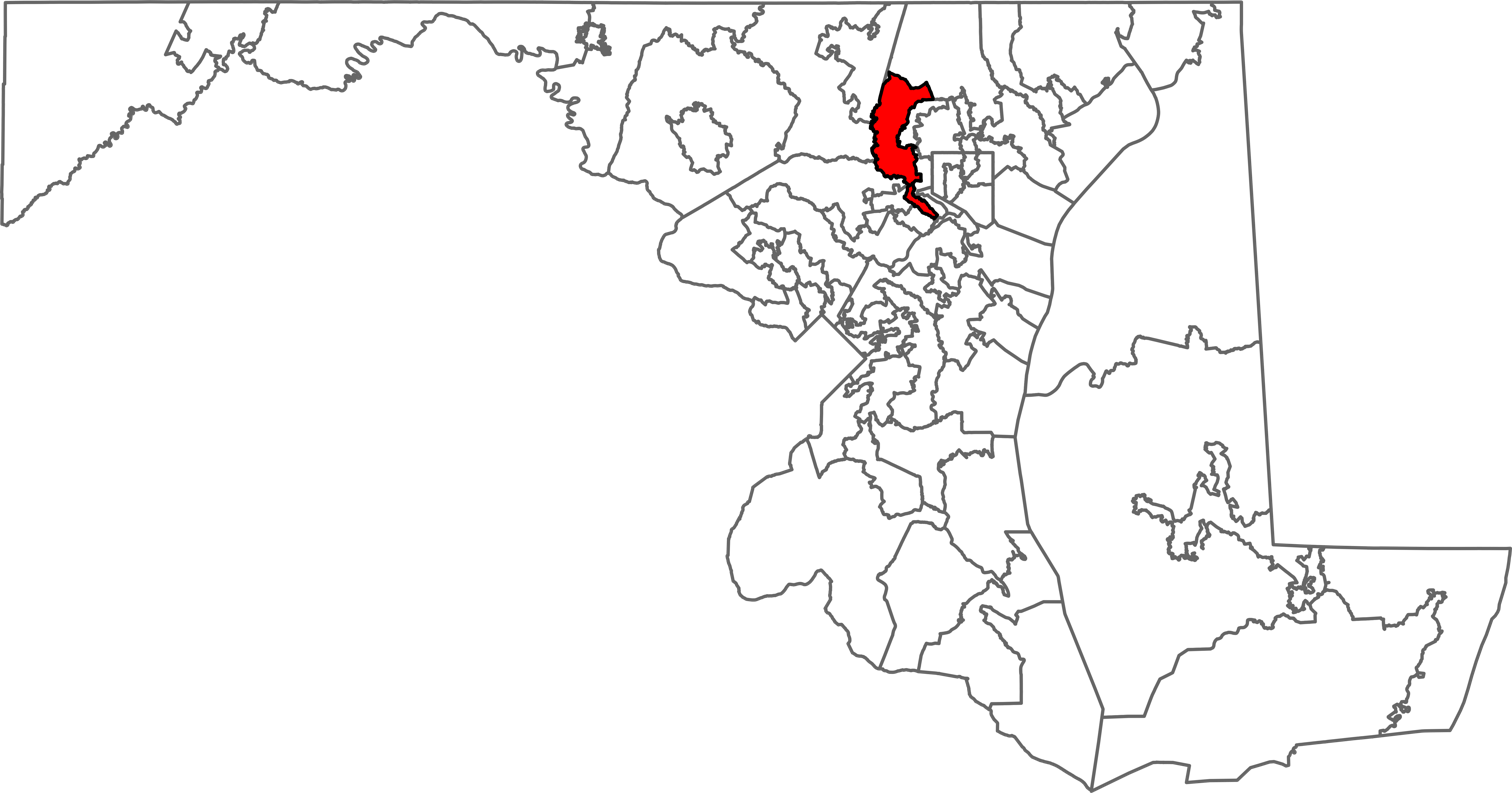
- Senator: Benjamin T. Brooks Sr. (D)
- Delegate(s): Adrienne A. Jones (D); N. Scott Phillips (D); Jennifer White Holland (D)
- Registration: 71.1% Democratic; 12.5% Republican; 15.1% unaffiliated
- Demographics: 25.0% White; 60.3% Black/African American; 0.3% Native American; 4.7% Asian; 0.0% Hawaiian/Pacific Islander; 4.1% Other race; 5.6% Two or more races; 7.1% Hispanic
- Population (2020): 122,424
- Voting-age population: 95,144
- Registered voters: 83,265

Maryland Legislative District 10 is one of 47 districts in the state for the Maryland General Assembly. It covers part of Baltimore County. The district is represented by three delegates in the Maryland House of Delegates.

== Demographic characteristics ==
As of the 2020 United States census, the district had a population of 122,424, of whom 95,144 (77.7%) were of voting age. The racial makeup of the district was 30,566 (25.0%) White, 73,788 (60.3%) African American, 419 (0.3%) Native American, 5,694 (4.7%) Asian, 30 (0.0%) Pacific Islander, 5,023 (4.1%) from some other race, and 6,897 (5.6%) from two or more races. Hispanic or Latino of any race were 8,634 (7.1%) of the population.

The district had 83,265 registered voters as of October 17, 2020, of whom 12,553 (15.1%) were registered as unaffiliated, 10,415 (12.5%) were registered as Republicans, 59,162 (71.1%) were registered as Democrats, and 755 (0.9%) were registered to other parties.

== Political representation ==
The district is represented for the 2023–2027 legislative term in the State Senate by Benjamin T. Brooks Sr. (D) and in the House of Delegates by Adrienne A. Jones (D), N. Scott Phillips (D) and Jennifer White Holland (D).

== Election history ==
=== Multi-member Senate district (1967–1975) ===
Years	Senator	Party	Electoral history	Years	Senator	Party	Electoral history
January 2, 1963 – January 8, 1975	Verda Welcome	Democratic	Redistricted from Baltimore City's 4th district and re-elected in 1966. Re-elected in 1970. Redistricted to the 40th district.	January 18, 1967 – January 8, 1975	Clarence Mitchell III	Democratic	Elected in 1966. Re-elected in 1970. Redistricted to the 38th district.

=== Single-member Senate district (1975–present) ===
Years	Senator	Party	Electoral history
January 8, 1975 – August 28, 1981	John J. Bishop Jr.	Republican	Redistricted from District 13-D and re-elected in 1974. Re-elected in 1978. Resigned to become a judge of the Maryland; Court of Special Appeals.
October 7, 1981 – January 12, 1983	F. Vernon Boozer	Republican	Appointed to finish Bishop's term. Redistricted to the 9th district.
January 12, 1983 – January 9, 1991	Francis X. Kelly	Democratic	Redistricted from the 5th district and re-elected in 1982. Re-elected in 1986. Lost renomination.
January 9, 1991 – January 11, 1995	Janice Piccinini	Democratic	Elected in 1990. Redistricted to the 11th district.
January 9, 1991 – January 11, 2023	Delores G. Kelley	Democratic	Elected in 1994. Re-elected in 1998. Re-elected in 2002. Re-elected in 2006. Re-elected in 2010. Re-elected in 2014. Re-elected in 2018. Retired.
January 11, 2023 – present	Benjamin Brooks	Democratic	Elected in 2022. Re-elected in 2026.
