= Emmett C. Burns Jr. =

American politician (1940–2022)

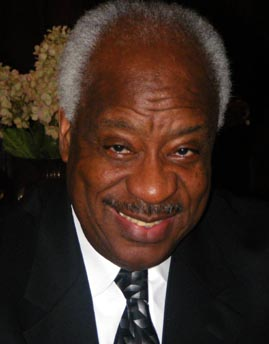
- Burns in 2007

Member of the Maryland House of Delegates from the 10th district
- In office January 11, 1995 – January 14, 2015
- Preceded by: Bob Ehrlich; Wade Kach; Ellen Sauerbrey
- Succeeded by: Benjamin Brooks

Personal details
- Born: August 26, 1940 Jackson, Mississippi, U.S.
- Died: March 17, 2022 (aged 81) Lochearn, Maryland
- Party: Democratic
- Occupation: Minister

Emmett C. Burns Jr. (August 26, 1940 – March 17, 2022) was an American politician from Maryland and a member of the Democratic Party. He served five terms in the Maryland House of Delegates, representing Maryland's District 10 in Baltimore County. Burns was a member of the Economic Matters Committee.

On July 8, 2013, Burns announced his intention not to seek re-election to the Maryland Legislature in 2014. He died on March 17, 2022.

== Early life and career ==
Burns was born in Jackson, Mississippi, on August 26, 1940. He earned a B.S. degree from Jackson State University, a Master of Divinity degree from Virginia Union University, a Master of Religious Education degree from the Presbyterian School of Christian Education, and a Ph.D. from the University of Pittsburgh. After a brief stint in the United States Air Force, Burns became a Baptist minister in Baltimore.

== In the Legislature ==
Burns, a Democrat, was considered a conservative on some social issues. He opposed a woman's right to choice regarding abortions and efforts to legalize slot machines in the state. He was also an opponent of legalizing same-sex marriage. Burns was involved in government task forces on the legacy of slavery in Maryland, on the impact of cults in institutions of higher education, and on entrepreneurship among African Americans. He was a member of the Legislative Black Caucus of Maryland. He sponsored the bill that changed the name of Maryland's major airport to the Baltimore/Washington International Thurgood Marshall Airport. After 5 four-year terms in the legislature, Burns opted not to file for re-election in 2014.

=== Legislative notes ===
- voted for the Clean Indoor Air Act of 2007 (HB359)
- voted for income tax reduction in 1998 (SB750)
- voted in favor of increasing the sales tax while simultaneously reducing income tax rates for some income brackets - Tax Reform Act of 2007(HB2)
- Introduced House Bill 90 to invalidate marriages between same-sex couples validly entered into in another state or in a foreign country, declaring that "marriages between individuals of the same sex are against the public policy of the State." On WYPR's Maryland Morning with Sheilah Kast (January 26, 2010), Burns was quoted as saying "Same sex marriages are bad economic policy, bad social policy, bad educational policy, it's just bad policy."

If it had been voted and signed into law, House Bill 90 would have added further restrictions to Maryland's marriage laws for same-sex couples. The bill was defeated on February 3, 2010.

- voted against Civil Marriage Protection Act, a law allowing same-sex couples to obtain a marriage license.

=== 2006 General election results District 10 ===
Voters to choose three:

Name	Votes	Percent	Outcome
Emmett C. Burns Jr.	29,140	34.2%	Won
Shirley Nathan-Pulliam	28,544	33.5%	Won
Adrienne A. Jones	27,064	31.8%	Won
Write-in votes	370	0.4%	

== Controversies ==
=== Altercation with a tow truck driver ===
In 1999, Burns accused a tow truck driver of uttering a racial slur, a claim the driver denied. Michael Stansbury, a tow truck driver for Flash Towing, said that he denied service to the politician after Burns started shouting at him and used a profane term to refer to his race.

=== Letter to Baltimore Ravens owner ===
After Baltimore Ravens linebacker Brendon Ayanbadejo voiced his support for same-sex marriage, Burns wrote a letter on August 29, 2012, to Ravens owner Steve Bisciotti, on official Maryland State letterhead, demanding that Mr. Bisciotti "take the necessary action ... to inhibit such expressions from your employee," further stating, "I know of no other NFL player who has done what Mr. Ayanbadejo is doing." Ayanbadejo's off-field activities did not violate any NFL or Ravens' rules or regulations. Burns was criticized for trying to use the authority of his government position to prevent a citizen from exercising their First Amendment rights and for taking a public position on same-sex marriage that was in direct conflict with his Democratic Party platform and the constituency that elected him. In an interview for The Washington Post, a spokesperson for the Ravens acknowledged that the team had received the letter but refused to give any further comment. Later however, the Ravens publicly supported Ayanbadejo's right to voice his viewpoints. Ayanbadejo himself affirmed in a subsequent interview with The Baltimore Sun that he had received public support for his actions and that he had no intention of backing away from them.

Minnesota Vikings punter Chris Kluwe famously came to Ayanbadejo's defense, penning a scathing retort for the popular sports website Deadspin. After echoing previous criticisms and wondering why Burns "hates freedom," Kluwe stated that making gay marriage legal "won't magically turn you into a lustful cockmonster" and that he himself has been very vocal in supporting same-sex marriage, despite Burns's claim that Ayanbadejo was the only NFL player to do so.

Burns ultimately recanted his demand and acknowledged that Ayanbadejo had the right to speak out on same-sex marriage.

== Death ==
Burns died March 17, 2022. His funeral was held on March 26 at his church, Rising Sun First Baptist Church in Baltimore County, Maryland. He was laid to rest at Garden Memorial Park in Jackson, Mississippi.
