= Delores G. Kelley =

American politician (born 1936)

Delores Goodwin Kelley
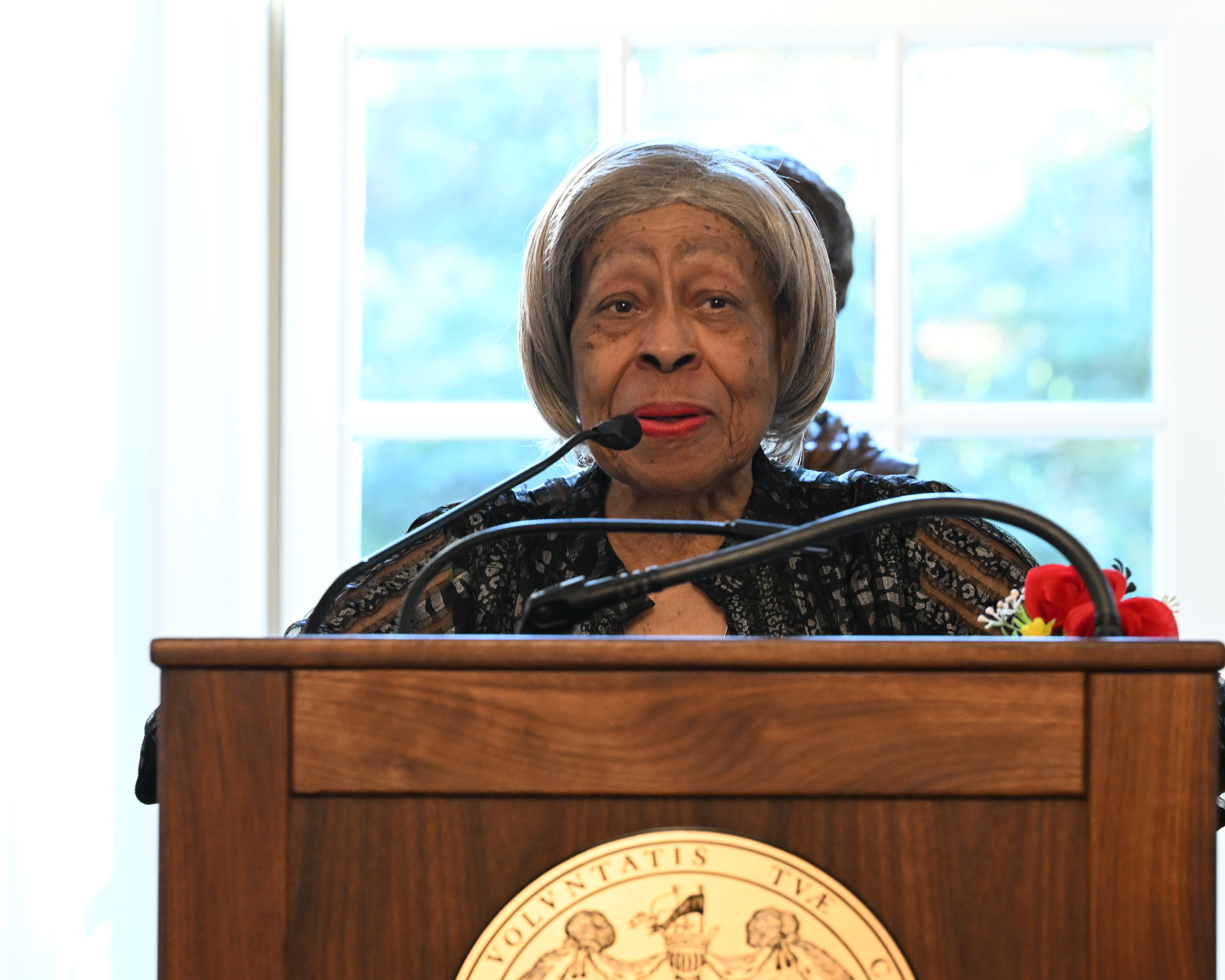
- Kelley in 2026

Member of the Maryland Senate from the 10th district
- In office January 11, 1995 – January 11, 2023
- Preceded by: Janice Piccinini
- Succeeded by: Benjamin Brooks

Member of the Maryland House of Delegates from the 42nd district
- In office January 9, 1991 – January 11, 1995 Serving with James W. Campbell and Samuel I. Rosenberg
- Preceded by: David B. Shapiro
- Succeeded by: Maggie McIntosh

Personal details
- Born: May 1, 1936 (age 90) Norfolk, Virginia, U.S.
- Party: Democratic
- Spouse: Russell
- Relations: former Delegate Darryl Kelley
- Occupation: University professor

Delores Goodwin Kelley (born May 1, 1936) is an American politician from Maryland and a member of the Democratic Party. She was a member of the Maryland Senate, representing Maryland's District 10 in Baltimore County.

== Background ==
Born in Norfolk, Virginia on May 1, 1936, Kelley received a bachelor's degree from Virginia State College in 1956. She went on to earn three more degrees; an M.A. in education from New York University, an M.A. in speech communication from Purdue University, and a Ph.D. in American studies from the University of Maryland, College Park. A lifelong educator, Kelley has taught at Coppin State University since 1973. She volunteered or served with a number of organizations, most prominently the Democratic Party, the National Endowment for the Humanities, and the Baltimore Urban League. Kelley is a member of the Union Baptist Church in Baltimore.

== In the legislature ==
Kelley was originally elected to the legislature as a member of the House of Delegates in 1991. Following redistricting and after only one term in the House, she successfully ran for a seat in the State Senate representing Baltimore County. Kelley serves both as the chair of the Executive Nominations Committee and as a member of the Finance Committee. She is also a member of the Maryland State Commission on Criminal Sentencing Policy and the Legislative Black Caucus of Maryland. Along with Sen. Paul G. Pinsky, she is the longest serving member of the Maryland Senate.

In December 2021, Kelley announced that she would not seek re-election.
